= Yele Mallappa Shetty =

Rao Bahadur Yele Mallappa Shetty
- ಎಲೆ ಮಲ್ಲಪ್ಪ ಶೆಟ್ಟಿ
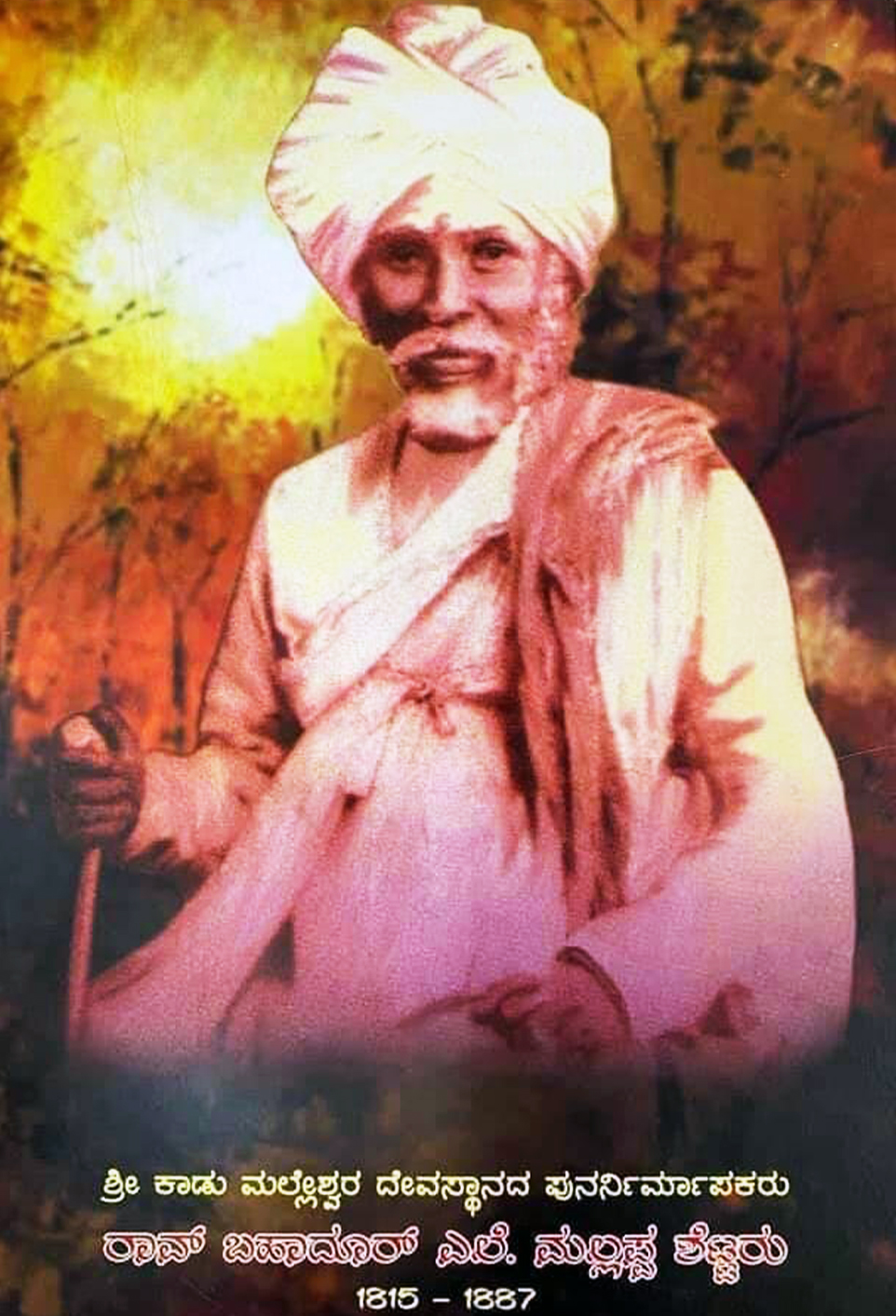
- Portrait of Yele Mallappa Shetty

Personal details
- Born: Mari Mallappa Shetty; 1815 Bangalore, Kingdom of Mysore (now in Karnataka)
- Died: 1887 (aged 71–72) Bangalore
- Spouse(s): Sharvanamma (till her death); Honnamma
- Children: 2
- Occupation: Philanthropist, Betel leaf merchant and farmer
- Known for: • Yele Mallappa Shetty Lake construction • Bangalore Maternity hospital initial setup (1880) • Kadu Malleshwara Temple re-construction

Rao Bahadur Yele Mallappa Shetty (Kannada: ರಾವ್ ಬಹದ್ದೂರ್ ಎಲೆ ಮಲ್ಲಪ್ಪ ಶೆಟ್ಟಿ), (1815-1887), was an Indian merchant and philanthropist. In the late 19th century when the Bangalore region was suffering from a great drought, He generously donated a large part of his wealth to the construction of a large lake to harvest rainwater and provide respite to the people, now its popularly known as Yele Mallappa Shetty Lake. He also had given financial assistance to set up the Bangalore's first maternity hospital in 1880.

He was honoured with the title "Rao Bahadur" by the British government for his philanthropy.

== Early years ==
Yele Mallappa Shetty was born in 1815 in a Lingayat family of Bangalore. He continued his family business and became a successful and rich Betel leaf merchant.

Shettaru was married to Sharvanamma, together they had two daughters named Nanjamma and Nirvanamma. After the death of his wife Sharvanamma, he was married to Honnamma.

== Social work ==
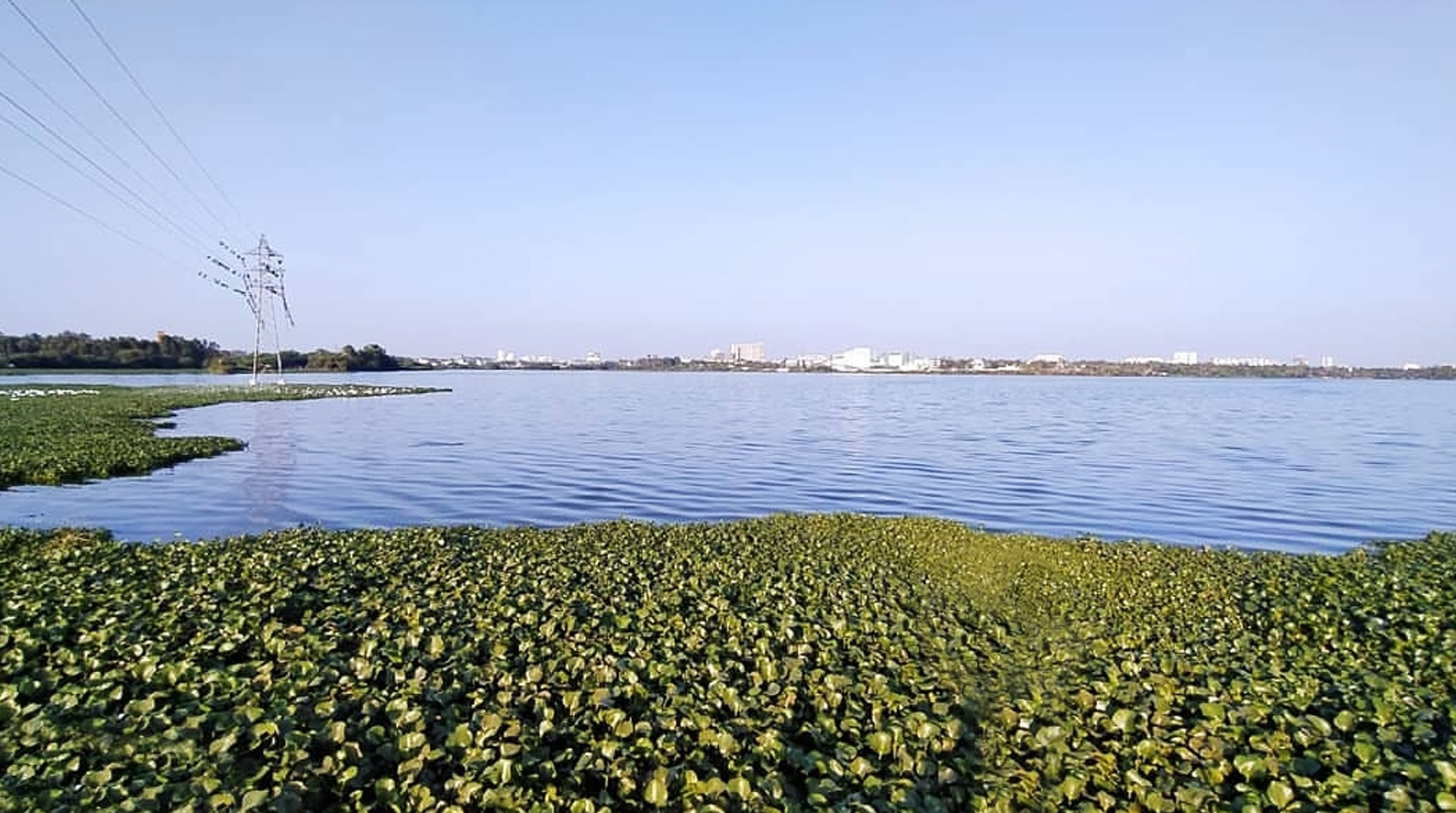
Yele Mallappa Shetty Lake in 2019

In the late 19th century during Great Famine of 1876–1878 when the Bangalore and surrounding areas were suffering from a great drought, The existing lakes and ponds had dried up and the British Government and the Mysore Kingdom were making all out efforts to meet the challenge of providing water to the parched residents, Yele Mallappa Shetty, generously donated a large part of his own wealth to the construction of huge lake now it is called as Yele Mallappa Shetty Lake to harvest rainwater and provide assistance to the people. As the effect of great draught, local farmers were suffering from food scarcity, Shettaru used them as a daily wage workers to construct the lake by giving financial support. The lake is located in North-East Bangalore, near Whitefield. The 260 acre Yele Mallappa Shetty lake is one of the largest lakes in Bangalore. The lake has the Old Madras Road passing through it. The lake served as a lifeline for people living in its vicinity. Later, it also began supplying water to Bangalore.

In 1880, After a death of one of the lake's construction workers during childbirth, Shettaru decided to set up a maternity hospital to help the women across Bangalore surrounding regions. The Bangalore's first government-run maternity hospital with 90 beds was set up on Cenotaph Road (present IGP office place on Nrupathunga Road) through huge financial assistance of Yele Mallappa Shetty. The hospital was popularly known as Yele Mallappa Shetty Maternity Hospital, in 1935, it was shifted and merged with current Vani villas hospital.

In Shettaru's last days, He involved in constructing the temple structure around the historic Kadu Malleshwara Temple in Malleswaram. The structure funded by Shettaru came to be completed after his death sometime in 1900.

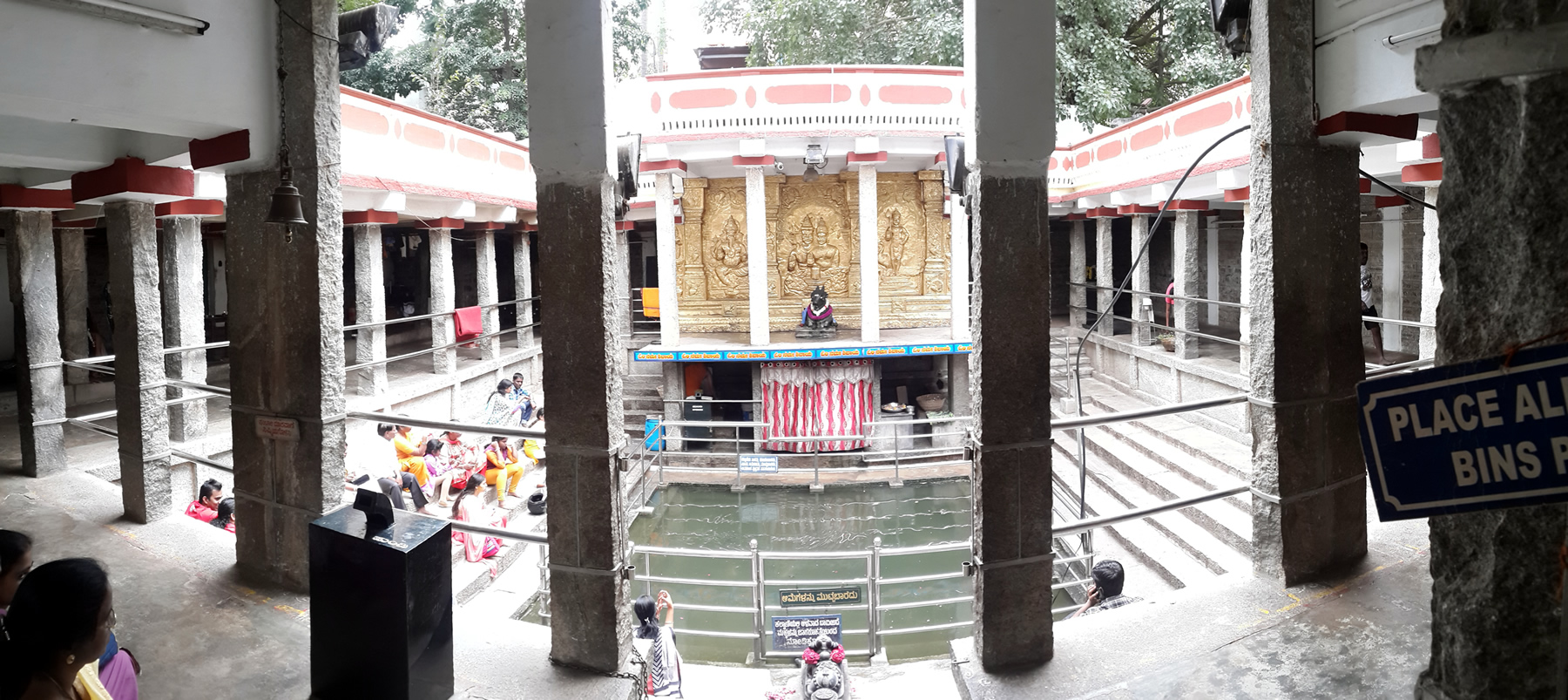
Nandi Tirtha Temple Malleswaram Bangalore

== Honours ==
- Queen Victoria, Empress of India, granted Yele Mallappa Shetty the nobility of "Rao Bahadur".
- A road in Bangarpet (earlier Bowringpet) was named after Yele Mallappa Shetty.

== Death ==
Yele Mallappa Shetty died in 1887 at the age of 72.

== See also ==
- K. P. Puttanna Chetty
- Sajjan Rao
- Gubbi Thotadappa
- Raja Sir Savalai Ramaswami Mudaliar
- Janopakari Doddanna Setty
