= Gubbi Thotadappa =

Indian businessman and philanthropist

Rao Bahadhur Dharmapravartha Gubbi Thotadappa
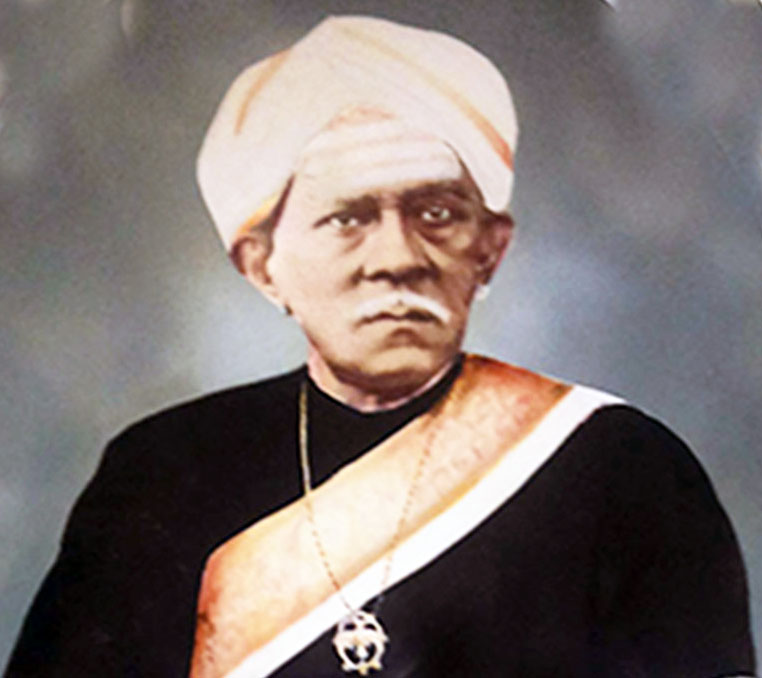

Personal details
- Born: 18 December 1838 Gubbi, Tumkur, Kingdom of Mysore (now in Karnataka)
- Died: 1910 Bangalore
- Spouse: Gowramma
- Occupation: Donor, RBDGTC Trust Founder
- Profession: Business man

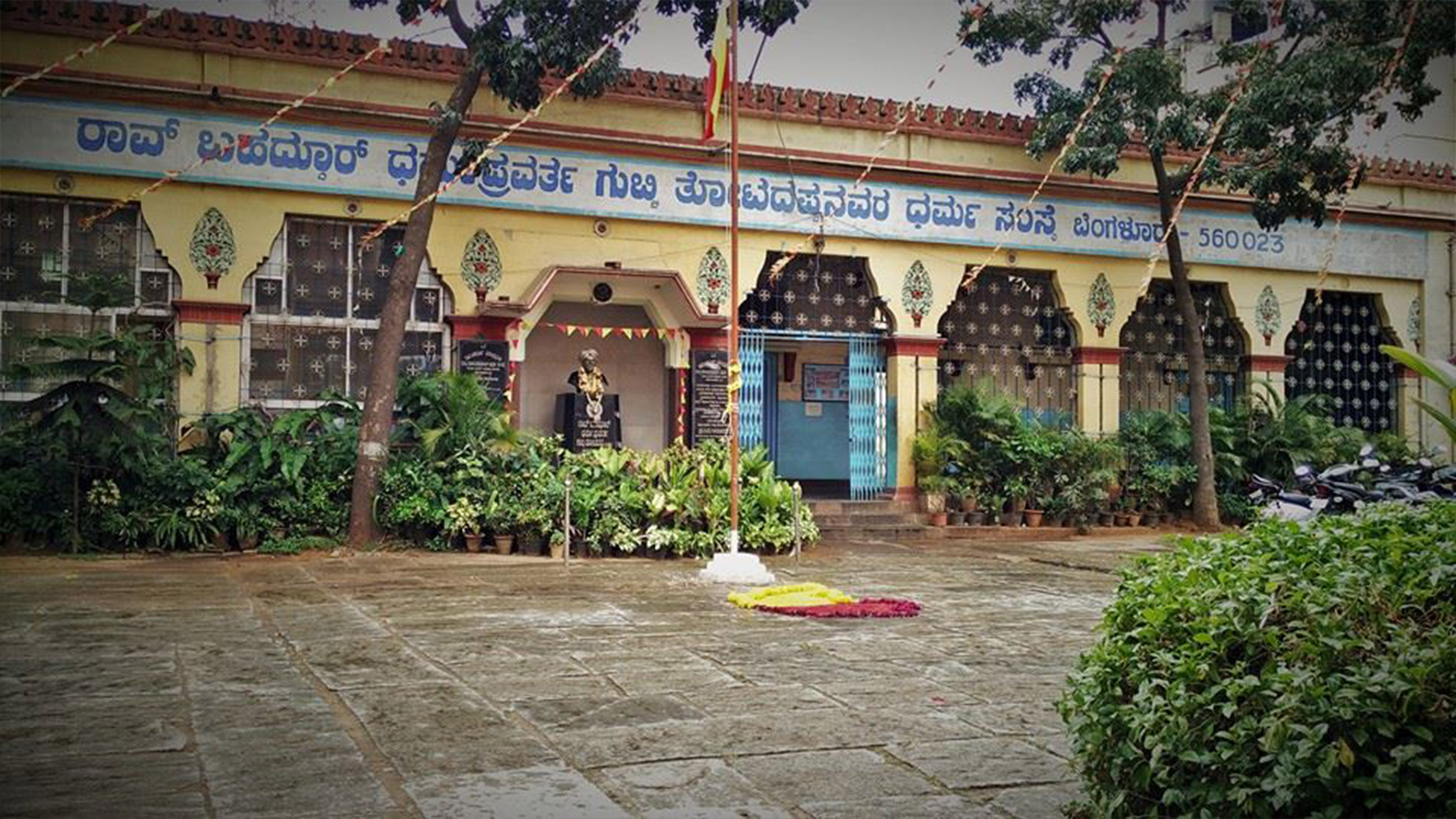
Rao Bahadur Dharmapravartha Gubbi Thotadappa Charities (RBDGTC)

Rao Bahadur "Dharmapravartha" Gubbi Thotadappa (Kannada: ರಾವ್ ಬಹದ್ದೂರ್ ಧರ್ಮಪ್ರವರ್ತ ಗುಬ್ಬಿ ತೋಟದಪ್ಪ), (1838-1910 Gubbi), was an Indian businessman and philanthropist. He founded a free lodging place for tourists from across the nation called "Thotadappa Chathra". He was honoured with the title "Dharmapravartha" by the Maharaja of Mysore, Krishnaraja Wodeyar IV and "Rao Bahadur" by the British government.

== Early years ==
Thotadappa was born in 1838 in a Lingayat family of Gubbi. His family moved to Bangalore in the later years where he started his business in Mamulpet.

== Social work ==
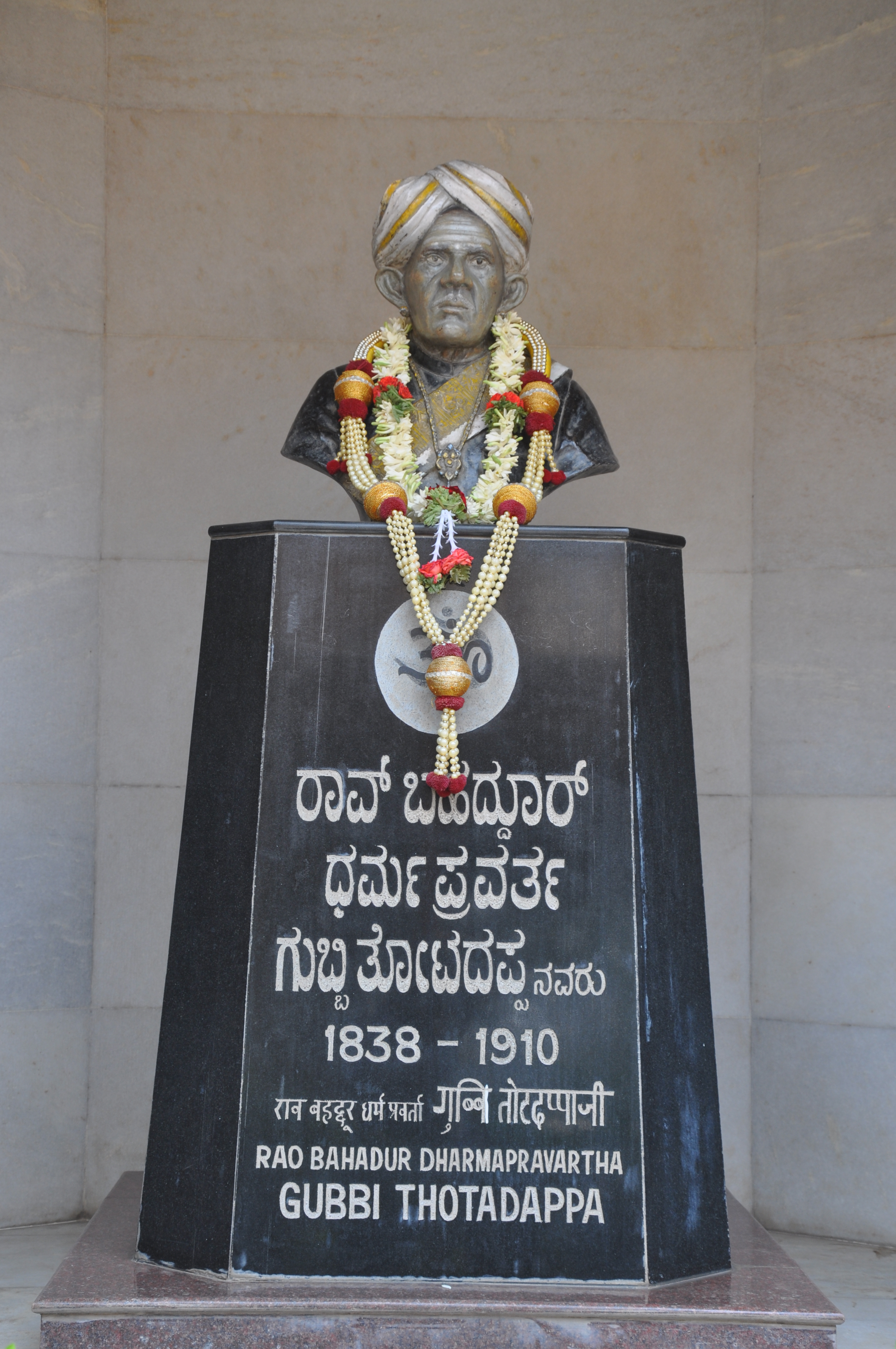
Gubbi Thotadappa statue in front of RBDGTC trust

Having no children of his own, Thotadappa decided to use all his property to the benefit of tourists and students. He founded a trust called Rao Bahadur Dharmapravartha Gubbi Thotadappa Charities (RBDGTC). In 1897, the trust bought a piece of land near Bangalore City Railway Station and, on 11 Feb 1903, Krishnaraja Wodeyar IV officially opened the Dharmachathra (for visiting tourists) and Free Hostel (for students). During his last days he donated all his property to RBDGTC trust and appointed K. P. Puttanna Chetty as first president of that trust. The trust continues its work today. This hostel facility was extended to all over Karnataka. In the year 2005, the hostel was reconstructed. For its centenary the trust built Bell Hotel at Kempegowda Bus Station as a source of income. The lodging facility offers accommodation at a nominal rate and is open to all, irrespective of their religion. Use of the hostel, however, is exclusive to students belonging to the lingayat community. To date the hostel has not received Government grants. The trust awards scholarships for merit to Lingayat students every year.

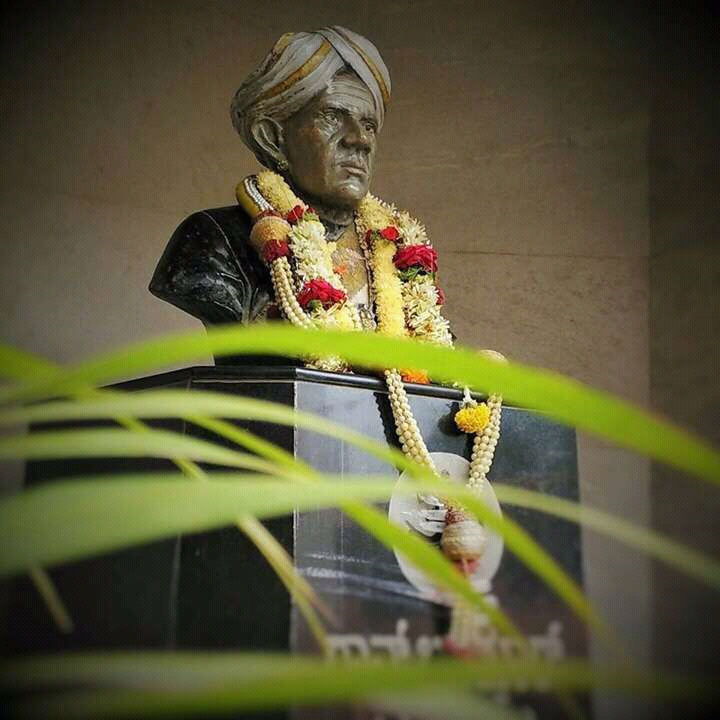
Rao Bahaddhur Dharma Pravartha Gubbi thothadappa Idol

== Honours ==
- In 1905, he was given the title "Dharmapravartha" by the Maharaja of Mysore, Krishnaraja Wodeyar IV, for his social services.
- In 1910, George V, Emperor of India, granted him the nobility of "Rao Bahadur".

== Death ==
On 21 February 1910, Thotadappa died at the age of 72.

== Influence ==
- Dr. Sree Sree Sree Shivakumara Swamiji was a student of Thotadappa hostel during the years 1927-1930.
- S. Nijalingappa, Karnataka's Fourth Chief Minister, was a student of Thotadappa hostel during the years 1921-1924.
- The Road in front of Bangalore City Railway Station was named "Gubbi Thotadappa road" in his honour.

== See also ==
- K. P. Puttanna Chetty
- Yele Mallappa Shetty
- Sajjan Rao
- S. Ramaswami Mudaliar
- Janopakari Doddanna Setty
