= Arcot Narrainswamy Mudaliar =

Philanthropist (1827–1910)

Arcot Narrainsawmy Mudaliar

Personal details
- Born: 14 May 1827 Arcot, India
- Died: 9 February 1910 (aged 82) Bangalore, India

Dharmarathnakara Rai Bahadur Arcot Narrainswamy Mudaliar (14 May 1827 – 9 February 1910) was a philanthropist with a strong affinity for social reform. He founded the R.B.A.N.M.'s Educational Charities and R.B.A.N.M.'s Chattram and other charities. He belongs to the Arcot Mudaliar community.

== Enterprises ==
Mudaliar commenced his commercial activity initially as a travelling salesman transporting vegetables which were available at a low price in Bangalore, and selling them at Madras, where they were in great demand. After gaining considerable profit and experience from this trade, he started transporting salt from Madras and selling it in Bangalore. He earned considerable profit from this two-way trade. With this capital, he opened a grocery shop on Cavalry road and later a branch in the Infantry Barracks. In the year 1859, he was granted the royal patronage of Krishnaraja Wodeyar III, the Maharaja of Mysore. As a token of gratitude to his royal patron, Mudaliar named his emporium on Cavalry Road 'Mysore Hall'. Later, Mudaliar ventured into a new line of business with Messrs. Wallace & Co. in partnership with Rai Bahadur Bansilal Ramrathan, who had secured from Richard Sankey, Chief Engineer to the Government of Mysore, the contract for the construction of the Public Offices Building or the Attara Kacheri. The contract was a success under the supervision of Munisawmy Mudaliar, Narrainswamy's younger brother. This line of business brought him a large fortune. Mudaliar set up the 'Bangalore Agency' at No.19, South Parade. This firm dealt with real estate, livestock, auctioneering etc., involving the army as well as the general public. Mudaliar was also engaged in other commercial activities such as excise contracts, banking etc.

== Idealism ==
Mudaliar believed that wealth was a trust to be utilised for assisting and uplifting the poor, and that diffusion of knowledge is philanthropy at its best - perennial, self-propagating and showering its blessings on future generations. The then situation impressed on his keen and observant mind that the basic needs of the day were facilities for educating both boys and girls, training youth to enable them to commence their lives as useful members of the society and relieving the distress of the poor and ailing as well as the socially backward and downtrodden. During that period there were no schools for teaching poor children either in their mother tongue or in English, no technical or commerce schools, no schools for Panchamas and other backward classes, no schools for girls, no orphanages for destitute children nor hostels for students in Bangalore.

== Endowments and their administration ==
During the Great Famine of 1876-78, Mysore State Railways was one of the relief works undertaken with the primary objective of meeting the prevailing distress. Due to the famine, the revenue collection had decreased and public debts were mounting. Public loans were floated to undertake public works and provide jobs to the unemployed peasants. Mudaliar invested in the Mysore Railways debentures to provide security to the amount which he had already set-apart for the schools established by him.

== Honours and titles ==
On the occasion of the assumption of the Imperial title of Kaiser'i-Hind, by Queen Victoria, a magnificent durbar was held at Delhi on 1 January 1877. In this durbar, Lord Lytton, the Viceroy of India, conferred on Mudaliar the title of Rai Bahadur in recognition of his acts of charity.

In 1894, Chamaraja Wodeyar X conferred on Mudaliar the title of Dharmarathnakara.

== Last days ==
Mudaliar retired from active life and entrusted the management of his business activities and charities to his nephew. He died on 9 February 1910, aged 82. A unique honour was accorded to him in permitting his remains to be interred in his own coconut garden at Veerapillai Street. Later, a samadhi was constructed by his grand-nephew, Thangavelu Mudaliar.

== See also ==
- K. P. Puttanna Chetty
- Yele Mallappa Shetty
