= Doddanna Setty =

Indian merchant and philanthropist

Janopakari Doddanna Setty
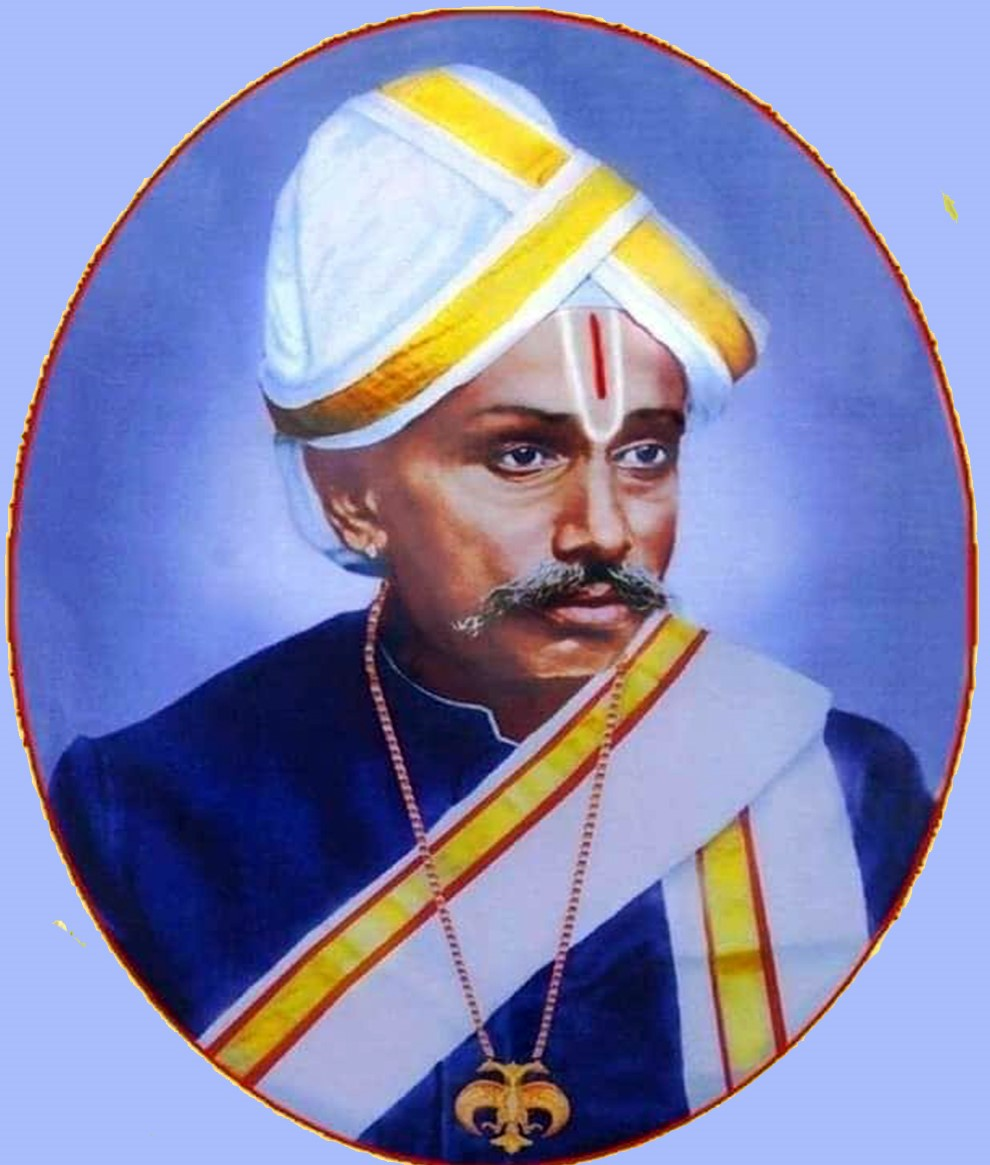
- Setty’s Portrait

Personal details
- Born: 3 February 1840 Bangalore, Kingdom of Mysore (now in Karnataka), British India
- Died: 5 August 1921 (aged 81) Bangalore, British India
- Children: 2
- Occupation: Philanthropist, merchant
- Known for: • Doddanna Hall • SLN Dharmapatashale • Sri Lakshmi Narasimhaswamy Temple renovation

Janopakari Doddanna Setty (also spelt as Doddanna Shetty), (1840–1921), was an Indian merchant and philanthropist from Bangalore, Mysore State, British India (now Karnataka, India). He is known for starting the Sri Lakshmi Narasimha Institution (SLN Institution) for free education to help poor students in 1906, and he also built a public function hall, popularly called "Doddanna Hall", which used to host cultural and public activities in 1905, and later converted into Paramount Talkies.

Doddanna Setty was given the title "Janopakari" (Generous) by the Maharaja of Mysore Krishnaraja Wodeyar IV, for his social services.

== Early years ==
Doddanna Setty was born on February 3, 1840, to parents named Nanjundappa and Siddamma in Bangalore. They belonged to the Ganiga community and traded in vegetable oil. During the 1830s, they lived near the Cantonment area at the Commercial Street. His father was popularly known as Yajaman (Master). Doddanna received the necessary education for the family business and after his father's death, he took over the position as Yajaman and continued the family business.

Doddanna lost three wives one after another. Although the fourth wife gave birth to two children, she also died prematurely. There was a severe plague attack in Bangalore In 1898 and the first son, Lakshminarayan, succumbed to the epidemic. A few years later, his second son Lakshminarasimha also died.

== Social work ==
After losing every family member in his life, Doddanna Setty decided to use his wealth to help people and provide free food, shelter and education for poor children.

=== SLN Dharmapatashale ===
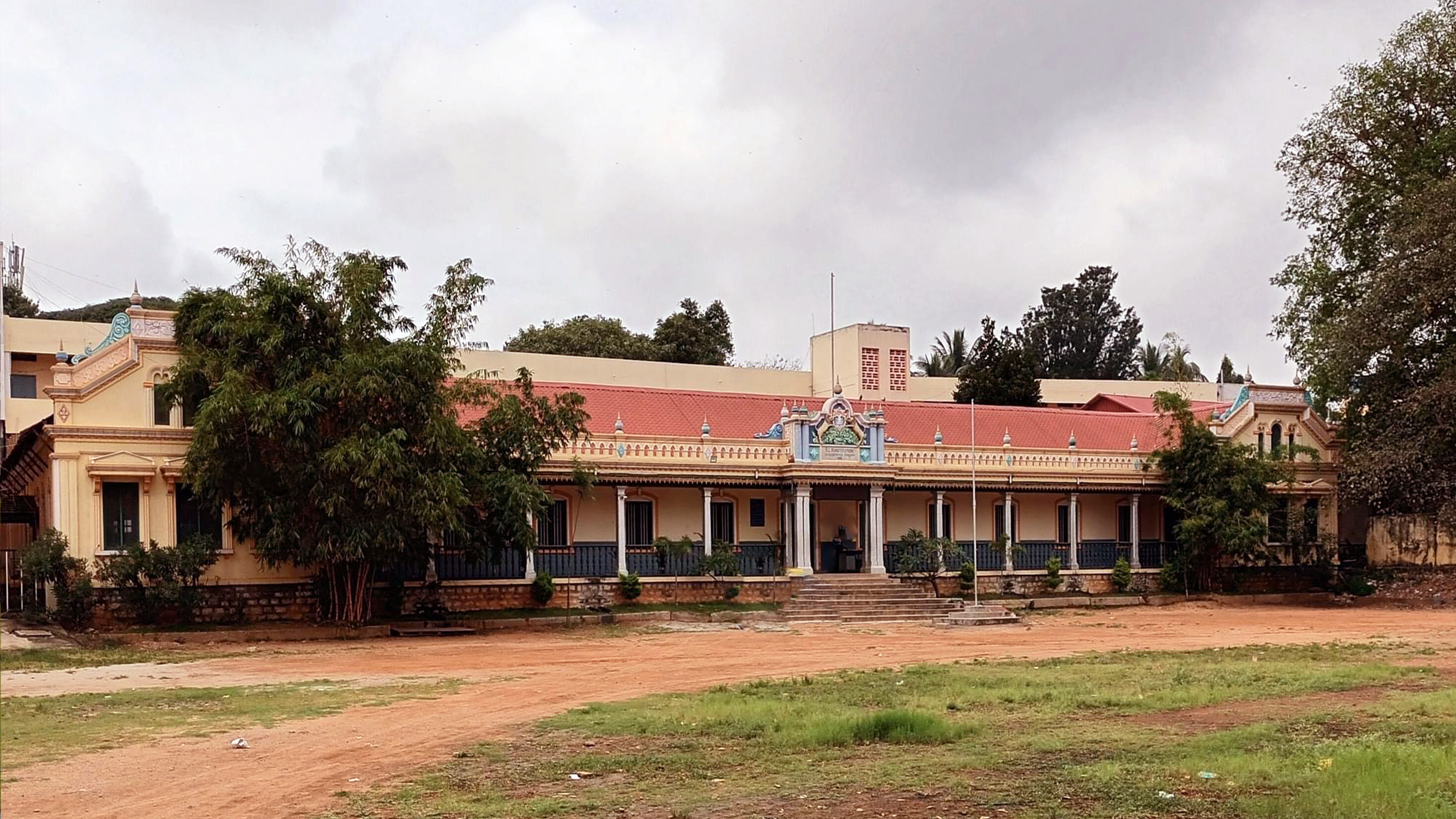
SLN Institution entrance, Bangalore

Doddanna Setty decided to establish Sri Lakshmi Narasimha Dharmapathashale (later SLN Charities) to educate children from all backgrounds. The Dharmapatasale enclosure wall was built on a 5.5 acres (2.2 Hectares) of land donated by Maharaja Krishna Raja Wadiyar IV of Mysore and on March 11, 1906, Krishna Raja Wadiyar IV inaugurated it. In 1909, the city municipality demolished the wall by mistake and so the Maharaja gave the land behind the Kote Anjaneyaswamy Temple. Uneven terrain was leveled with greater difficulty and mounting costs. In 1915, Lower Primary School was established here. In 1917, it was taken over by the Theosophical Society and under the guidance of Annie Besant it was developed into the SLN National High School. Later it shifted to Chamarajpet and then to Basavanagudi where it is called as present National High School. Doddanna Setty took over the SLN Dharmapathshala in 1918. His aim was children should study diligently and those who excelled should get admitted to the missionary schools in Bangalore. Night classes were organized for students from rural background. The SLN Charity continued its service and in 1966, started SLN College of Arts and Commerce at the SLN Dharmapatashale premises, which functions at present as well.

=== Doddanna Hall ===
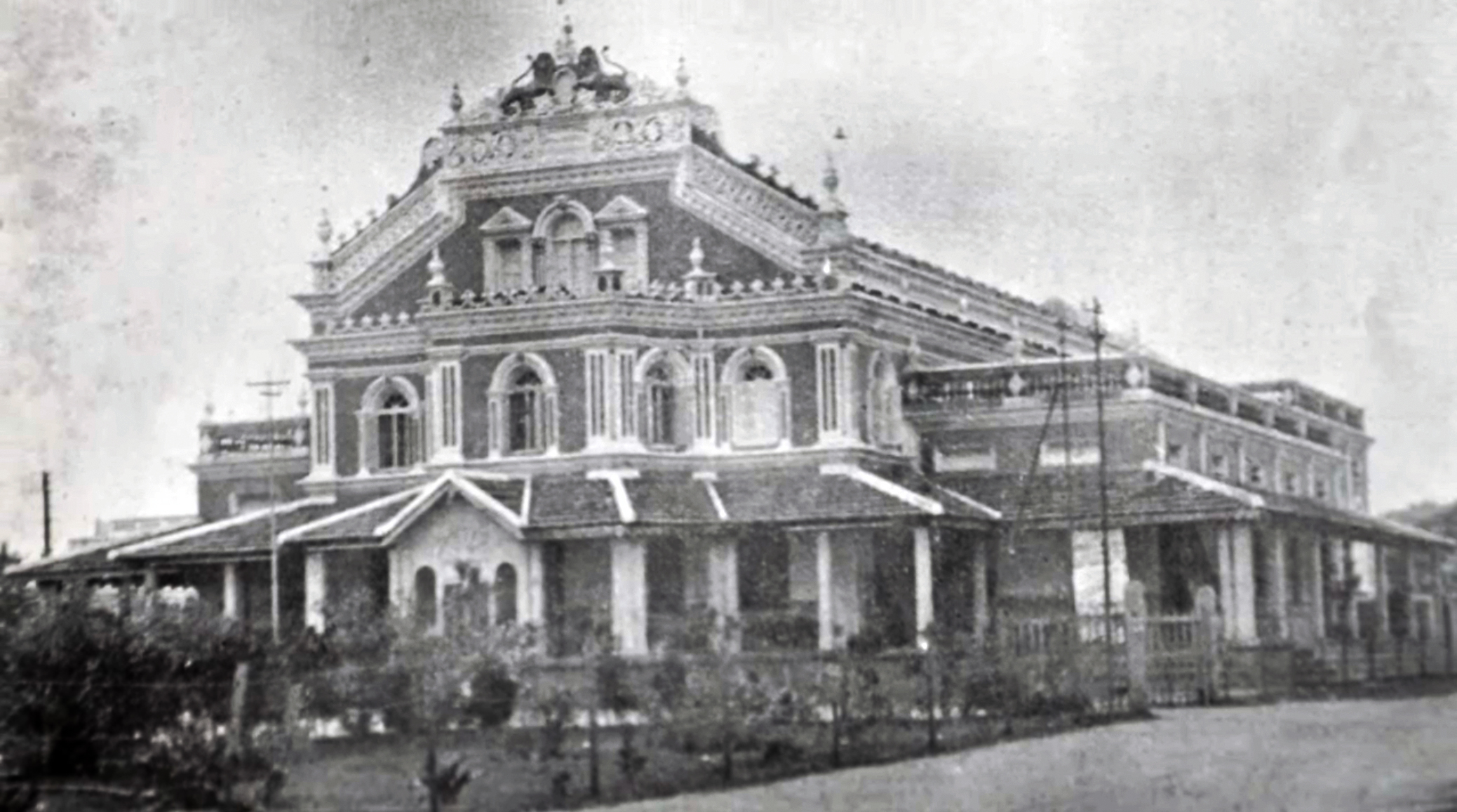
Doddanna hall in early 1900s, Bangalore

Doddanna Setty wanted a structure large enough to serve the purpose of a choultry, school, theater and assembly hall. He built a function hall building in 1905, at Kalasipalyam, KR Market, this building was recognised as a landmark in the city as "Doddanna Hall". The Doddanna hall functioned as a school during the day, a public function hall in the evening and a movie theater at night. Until Sir K. P. Puttanna Chetty built the Town Hall in 1935, it was the city's only large indoor venue for holding public events. This Hall was hosted Music, Drama, Dance, Concerts and Yakshagana performances.

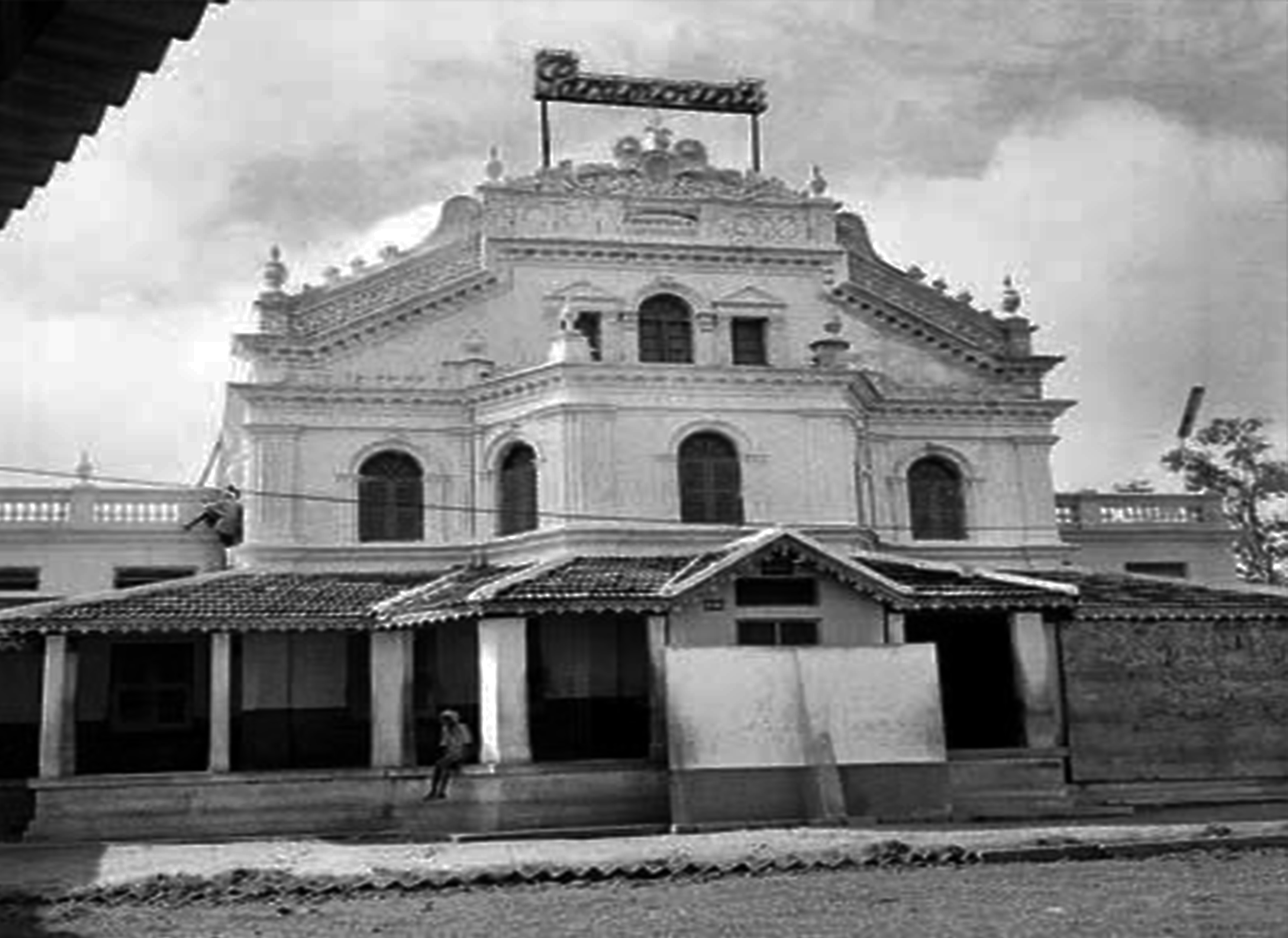
Doddanna hall upgraded to Paramount Theatre, Bangalore

When silent movie era started, Doddanna Hall was upgraded to be a film theatre. In 1913, India's first silent film, Raja Harishchandra was screened in the hall. With growing popularity and diversity in films screened, the management changed the name of Doddanna Hall to Paramount Theatre. The first talkie film in Kannada language, Sati Sulochana (1934), was screened here. It was the first to be screened in the Mysore State. After playing several roles, the Paramount Theater (Doddanna Hall) was demolished in 1974 and Pradeep and Parimala twin Theaters were built in the same place in 1976.

=== Devotional Services ===
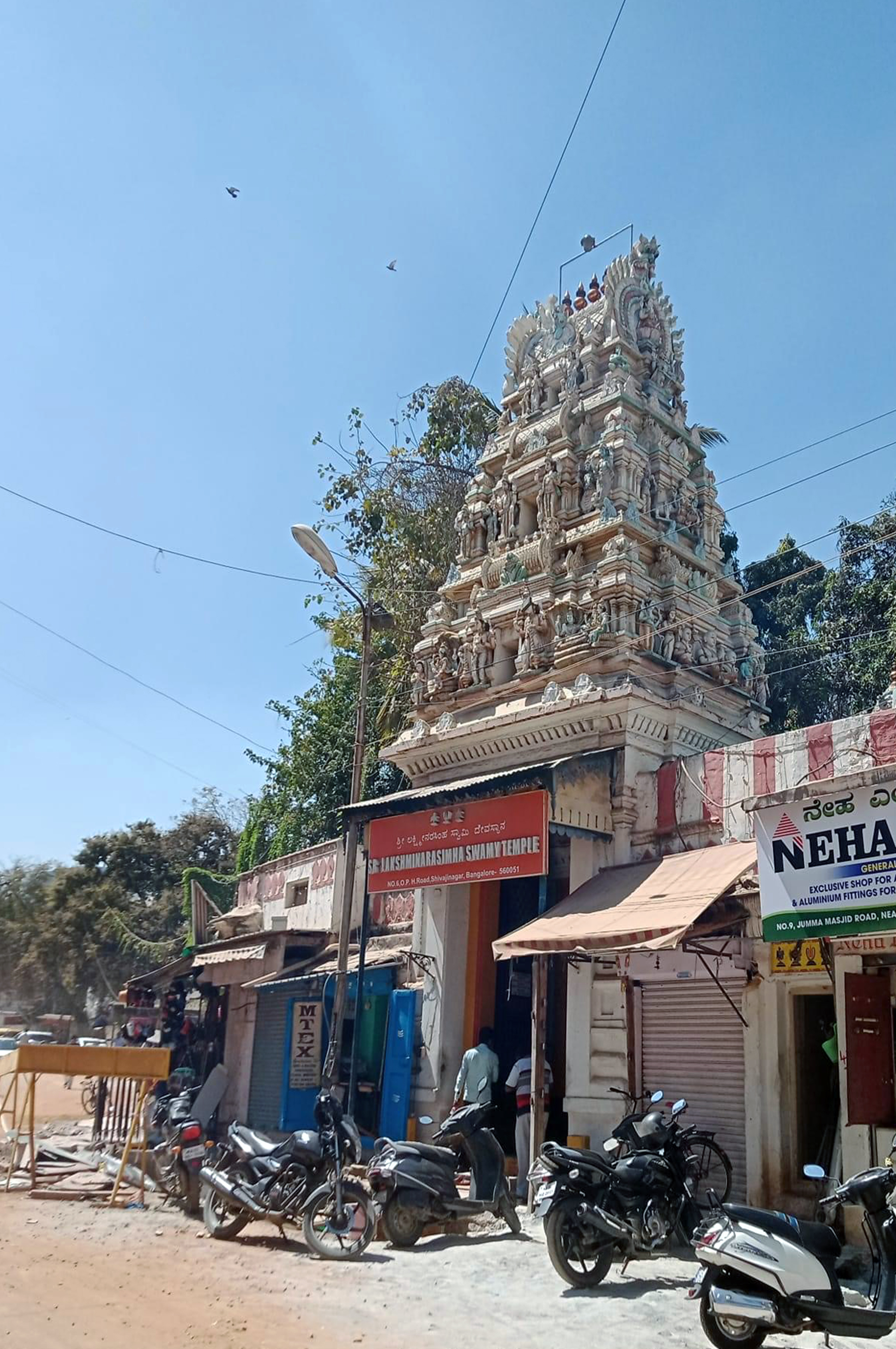
Lakshmi Narasimhaswamy Temple, Shivaji Nagar, Bangalore

In 1910, Doddanna Setty completely renovated the 19th-century Sri Lakshmi Narasimhaswamy Temple (located next to Jumma Masjid on OPH Road) into a full-fledged temple. In his last days, he took Sannyasa and started Sri Lakshmi Narasimhaswamy Aashrama.

== Death ==
Janopakari Doddanna Setty died on August 5, 1921, at the age of 81. A memorial was built in his honour at the SLN Institute premises.

== Honours ==
- On 18 October 1907, Doddanna Setty was given the title "Janopakari" by the Maharaja of Mysore Krishnaraja Wodeyar IV
- A landmark near KR Market, Bangalore is named after him as "Janopakari Doddanna Setty circle".

== See also ==
- Sajjan Rao
- K. P. Puttanna Chetty
- Gubbi Thotadappa
- Arcot Ramasamy Mudaliar
- Yele Mallappa Shetty
