= K. P. Puttanna Chetty =

Diwan Bahadur Sir K. P. Puttanna Chetty CIE
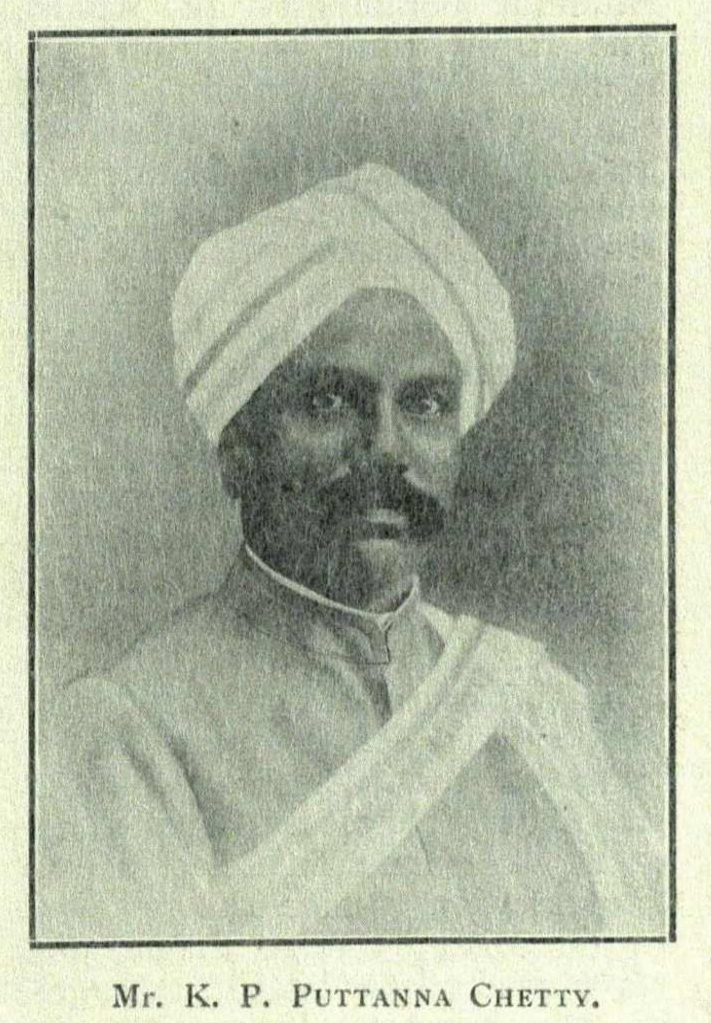

Personal details
- Born: 29 April 1856 Bangalore, Kingdom of Mysore (now in Karnataka)
- Died: 23 July 1938 (aged 82)
- Occupation: Bureaucrat and Philanthropist

Sir Krishnarajapur Palligonde Puttanna Chetty CIE (29 April 1856 – 23 July 1938) was a British Indian administrator, bureaucrat and philanthropist who served as the first President of the Bangalore municipality.

== Early life and education ==
Puttanna Chetty was born to a Kannada Speaking family in 1856 in a Banajiga Lingayat community of Bangalore. He was educated at the Central College, Bangalore and entered the Mysore civil service in 1875.

== Career ==
Chetty served as a traffic manager in the Mysore state railways from 1884 to 1898 and as Deputy Commissioner from 1898 to 1906. From 1906 to 1912, he also served as a member of the Bangalore City Council. In 1913, Puttanna Chetty was elected President of the Bangalore municipality and he served till 1919, inaugurating the Victoria Hospital and making many public donations during his tenure.

Puttanna Chetty was elected to the Mysore Legislative Council in 1925. Chetty served in various appointments during his life – as Chairman of the Bank of Mysore and Central Co-Operative Bank, Bangalore, Chairman of the Sri Krishnarajendra Mills and fellow of the Mysore University. Puttanna Chetty served as President at Rao Bahadhur Dharmapravartha Gubbi Thotadappa Charities from 1910 to 1938.

== Death ==
Puttanna Chetty died in 1938 at the age of 82.

== Honours ==
Puttanna Chetty was made a Diwan Bahadur in 1911. In 1917, he was made a Companion of the Order of the Indian Empire and was subsequently made a Knight Bachelor in 1925. He was also awarded the 1911 Durbar Medal and the Gold Kaiser-i-Hind Medal in 1914.

== Recognition ==
The 161st birth anniversary of Diwan Bahadur Sir K. P. Puttanna Chetty was celebrated on 29 April 2017 at the Free Veerashaiva Students Hostel which was established by him in 1938 in Bengaluru to support the poor students. The Bangalore Town Hall in Bengaluru is named for Chetty.

== See also ==
- Yele Mallappa Shetty
- Sajjan Rao
- S. Ramaswami Mudaliar
- Janopakari Doddanna Setty
