= Sri Dakshinamukha Nandi Tirtha Kalyani Kshetra =

Shiva temple in Bengaluru Urban district, Karnataka, India

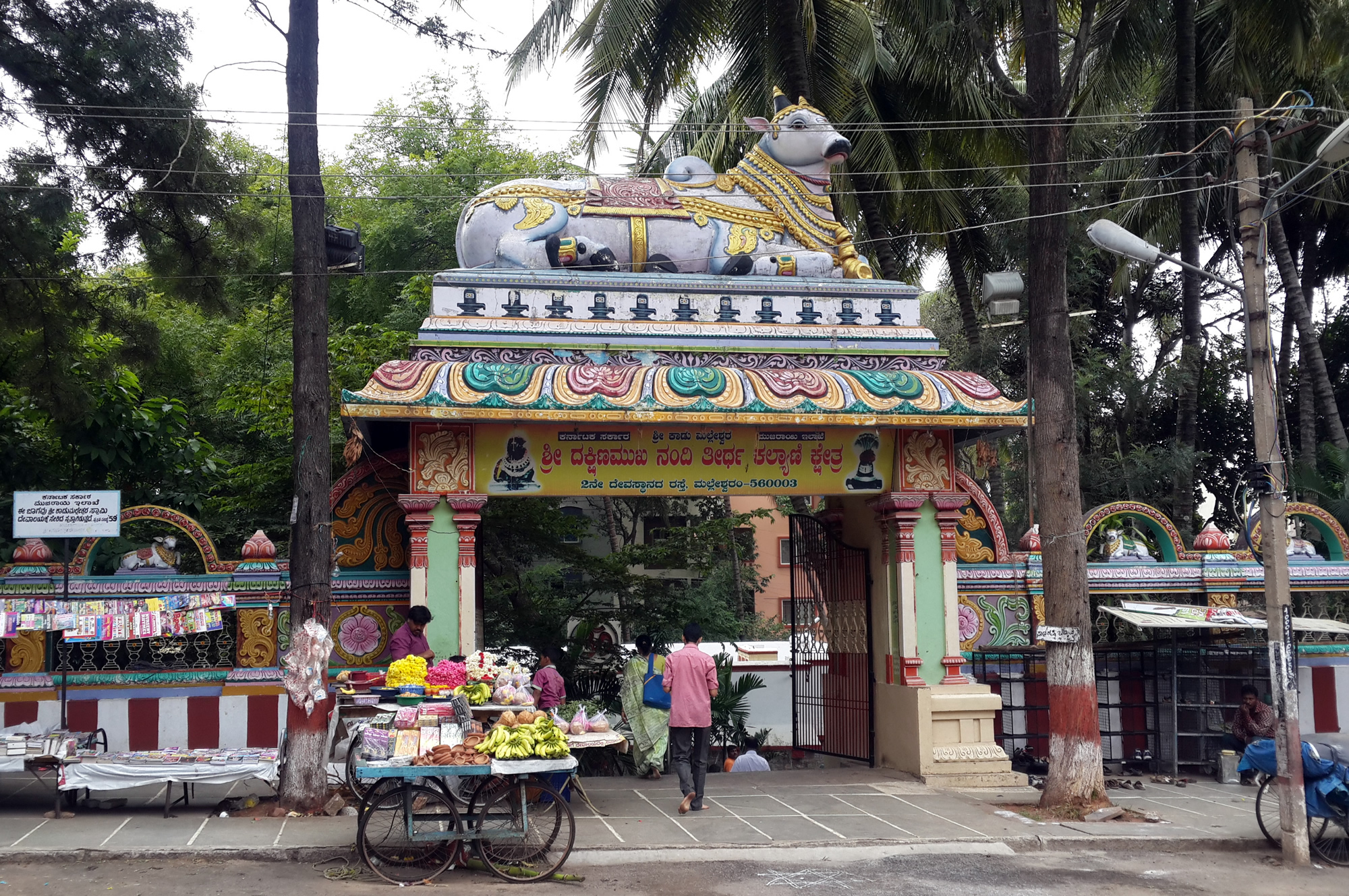
- Sri Dakshinamukha Nandi Tirtha Kalyani Kshetra

- Dakshinamukha Nandi Tirtha Kalyani Temple, Malleswaram, Bengaluru, Karnataka

Religion
- Affiliation: Hinduism
- District: Bangalore
- Deity: Shivalinga (Shiva)

Location
- Location: Malleswaram
- State: Karnataka
- Country: India
- Interactive map of Sri Dakshinamukha Nandi Tirtha Kalyani Kshetra
- Coordinates: 13.0044°N 77.5722°E

Sri Dakshinamukha Nandi Tirtha Kalyani Kshetra is a small temple located in front of the Gangamma temple and diagonally opposite to the Kadu Malleshwara temple on 2nd Temple Street, Malleswaram layout in the north-western area of Bangalore city, Karnataka, India.

The temple is also known as Nandi Tirtha, Nandishwara teertha, Basava teertha or simply as Malleswaram Nandi gudi. The main deity of the temple is Shiva, in the form of a Shiva Linga (lingam).

The temple was rediscovered in 1997 after being buried for 400 years. It's the holy source of the river vrishabhavati

== Toponymy ==
The focal point of this temple is a unique stone Nandi which is positioned facing the Southern direction – (Dakshina in Kannada) - as opposed to eastwards usually found in Indian temples. ‘Dakhshinamuka Nandi’ means ‘South facing Nandi.

There is a continuous stream of water that flows out of the Nandi’s mouth, which is considered to be holy water, referred to as ‘Tirtha’ in Kannada. Which is the holy source of the river Vrishabhavati

The water from the Nandi’s mouth falls onto the Shivalinga and flows into a stepped tank in the middle of the temple, called a ‘Kalyani’ - Temple tank in Kannada.

‘Kshetra’ means a ‘place’ in Kannada and is often used to refer to a place or region of historical or religious importance.

The combination of all the above elements adds up to the official name of the temple.

== Temple history ==
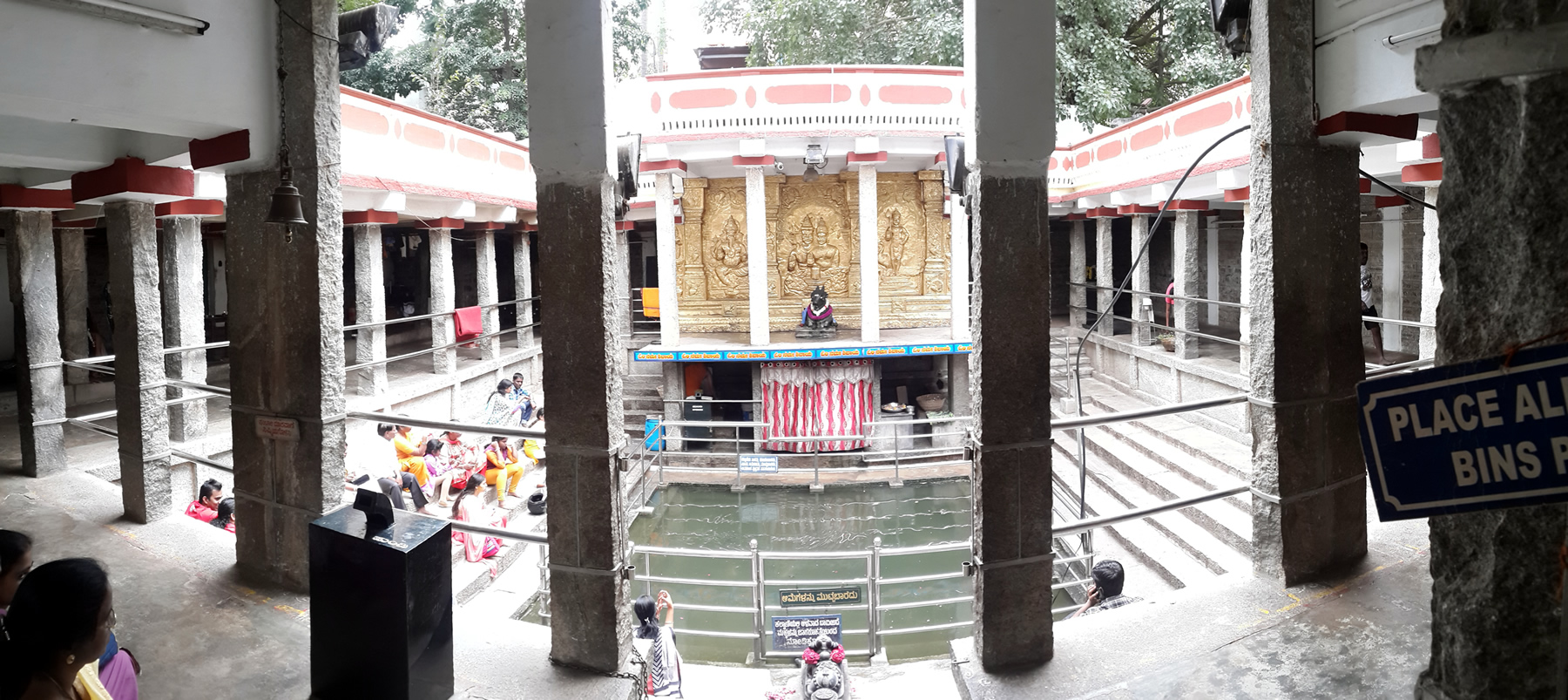
The Nandhi Teertha temple & Kalyani

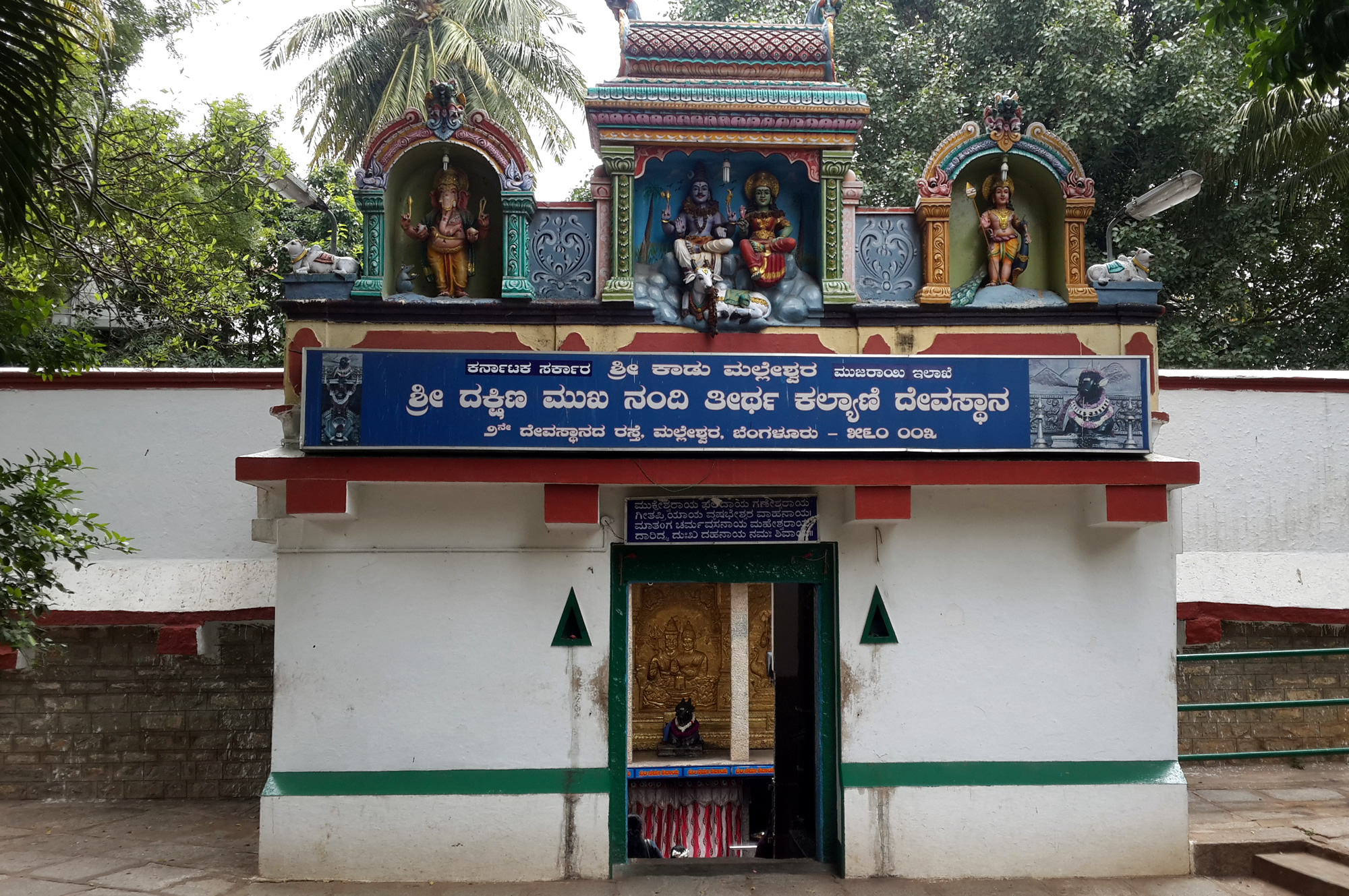
Entrance of the Nandi Tirtha Temple

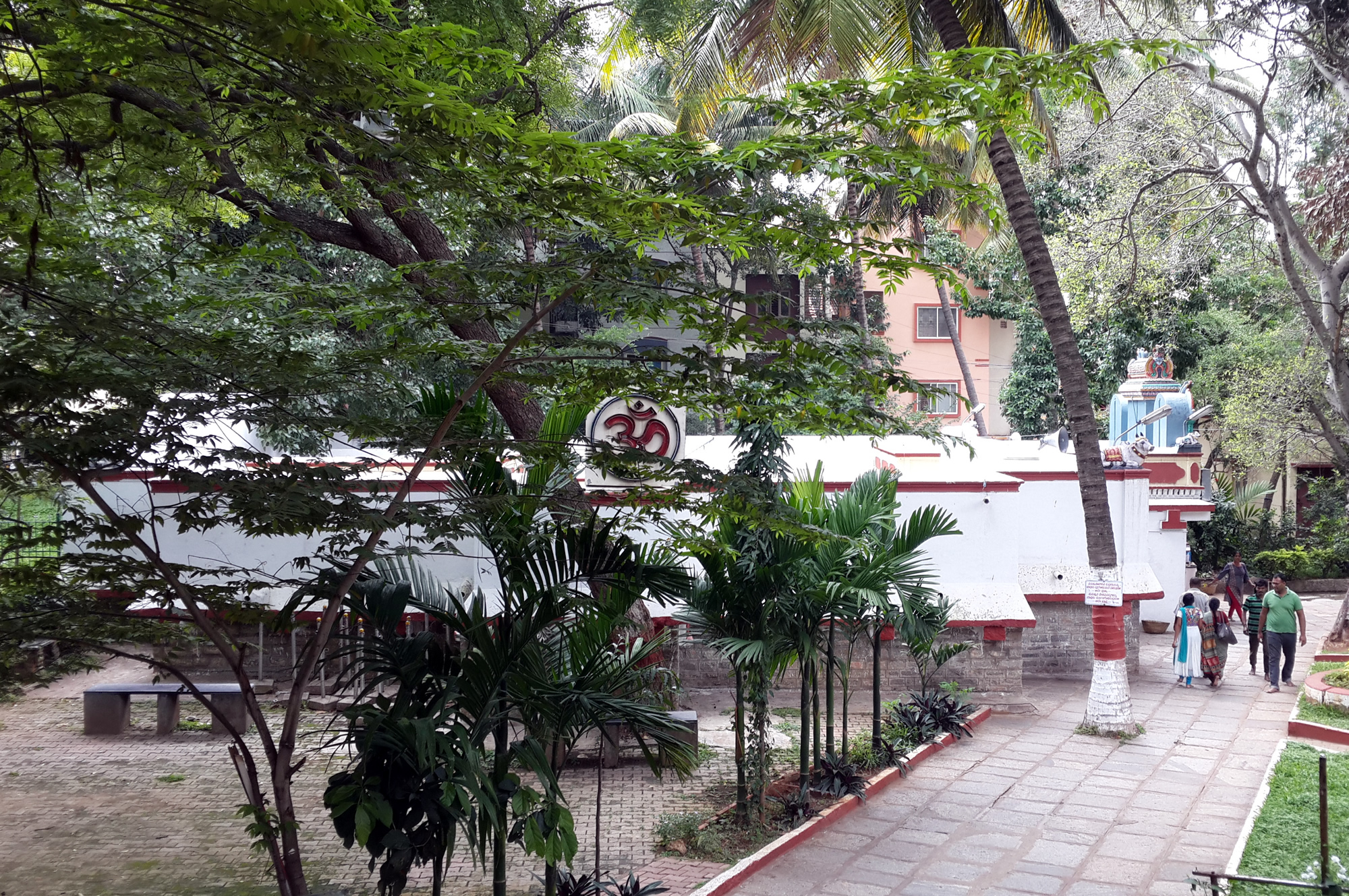
Nandi Tirtha Temple located at a lower level than the surrounding area

Another temple called Nandi-teertha, which was reported by some agencies to be 400 years old, was re-discovered in 1997 AD during excavation work in a place south-east of the Kadu Mallikarjuna temple. According to city historian Arun Prasad, carbon dating confirmed that the core structure is approximately 400 years old, dating its origin back to the 17th-century era of Maratha rule in Bangalore. This timeline aligns the shrine with the adjacent Kadu Malleshwara Temple, which features a 1669 CE inscription by Venkoji (Ekoji I), the stepbrother of Chhatrapati Shivaji Maharaj. The minimalist stone masonry and unadorned pillars characteristic of the Nandi Teertha temple reflect the Maratha style of architecture prevalent during the administrative control of Shahaji Raje Bhosale and his successors. However, B N Sundara Rao in his book, Bengalurina Itihasa, has documented that the late Rao Bahadur Yele Mallappa Shetty constructed this Kalyani along with the Nandi, and the Shiva-linga. The Kalyani was constructed sometime after the construction of Sankey tank in about 1882 AD. Downward stream from the Sankey tank was observed to be flowing towards the place by Mallappa Shetty. He constructed a conduit pipe from here to the mouth of the Nandi so that water flows gently through the mouth of the Nandi throughout the year onto a Shiva-linga idol (Nandikeshwara) which was set right underneath. This water was then channelled to a Kalyani (stepped tank) which is at a lower level such that excess water flowed onto a well found in the garden in front of the southern entrance of the temple. This was connected to a storm water drain (raja-kaluve) which emptied the excess into another tank bund called Jakkarayana kere. This network has unfortunately been encroached upon. Surrounding the Kalyani is a double storeyed colonnaded structure. A shrine to Ganesha is also present in the vicinity. This, along with the Kadu Mallikarjuna and Gangamma temples, marks the linkage of the sacred to a natural node now.

== 1997 rediscovery ==
At some point in its history, the Nandi Tirtha temple fell into disuse and was slowly buried under mud and dirt. As this temple is below the normal ground level of the surrounding area; and there is no Gopuram tower, the entire structure of this temple eventually disappeared from view.

However, knowledge of the existence of a Temple or Kalyani continued to survive in the memory of the people residing in this area.

As Malleswaram developed into one of the preferred residential areas of Bangalore, property prices increased significantly. In 1997, there was an attempt to usurp this temple area and sell it off as a vacant plot of land.

After protests by the local residents, the land in question was dug up and the temple complex gradually emerged from under the mud and dirt.

== Architecture and layout ==
The temple is essentially built as a pillared - covered corridor around a central stepped Temple tank or Kalyani.

The Nandi is considered to be Shiva’s vahana and usually placed in front, facing the Shivalinga in most temples. However, the Nandi in this temple is placed on a platform built above the Shivalinga.

A continuous stream of water flows out of the Nandi’s mouth and falls onto the Shivaling through an opening in the floor. The water then collects in the Kalyani and the over flow is evacuated into the open well outside the temple.

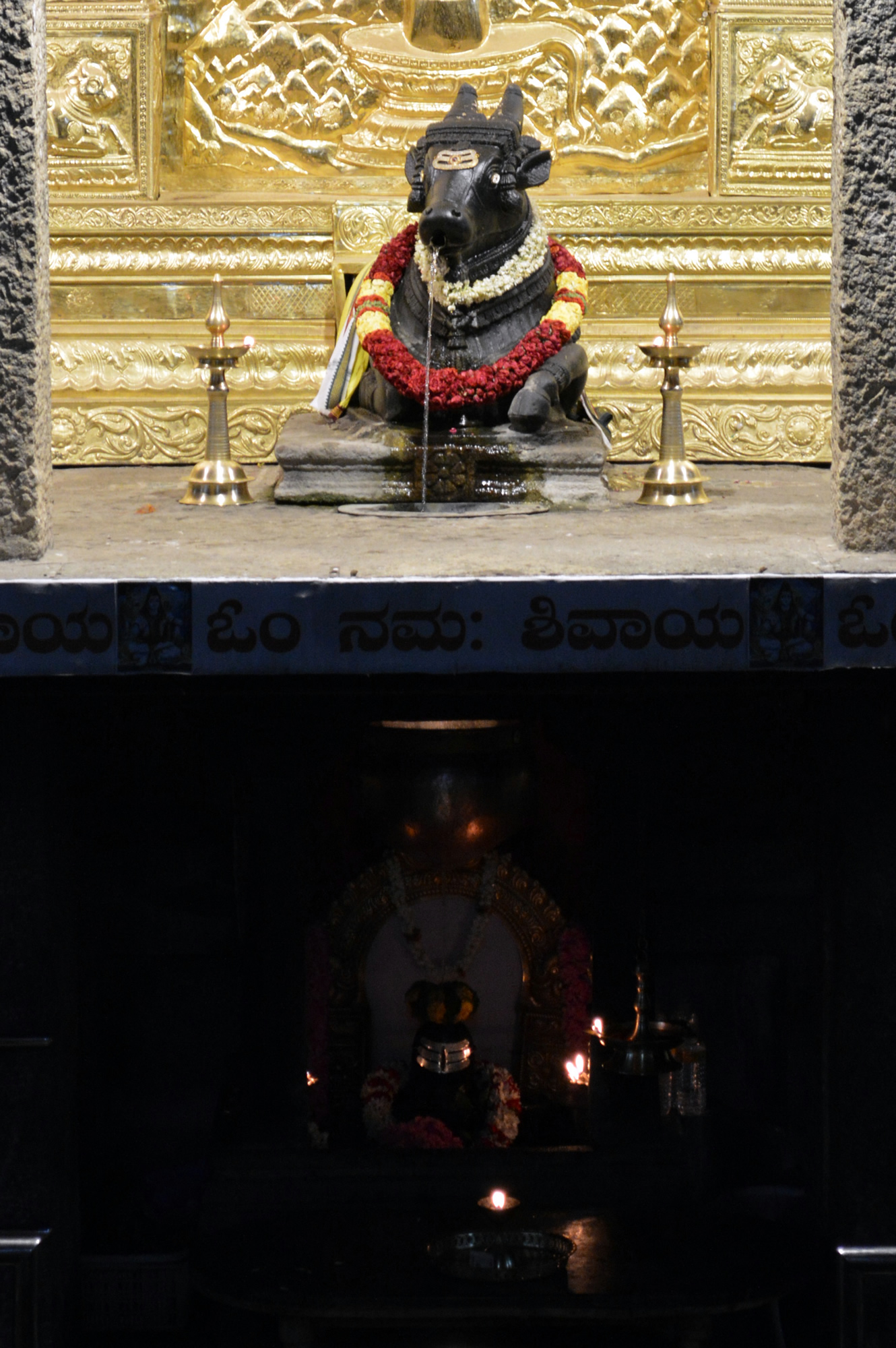
Water flowing out of Nandi’s mouth and falling on Linga

== Source of the water ==
The source of the water flowing out of the Nandi’s mouth is from the excess outflow from the Sankey Tank. which is the source of Bangalore's Vrishabhavati river

== Rituals and festivals ==
As a Shiva temple, all the traditional festivals and rituals associated with the main deity are organized and celebrated at this temple. Occasions like Maha Shivaratri see a huge crowd of devotees arriving for Darshan.

On regular days, the temple is open from 7:30 AM to 12 Noon and thereafter from 5:00 PM to 8:30 PM.

== Other shrines in the structure ==
There is a small shrine dedicated to Ganesha, located in the corridor towards the left of the Shivaling.

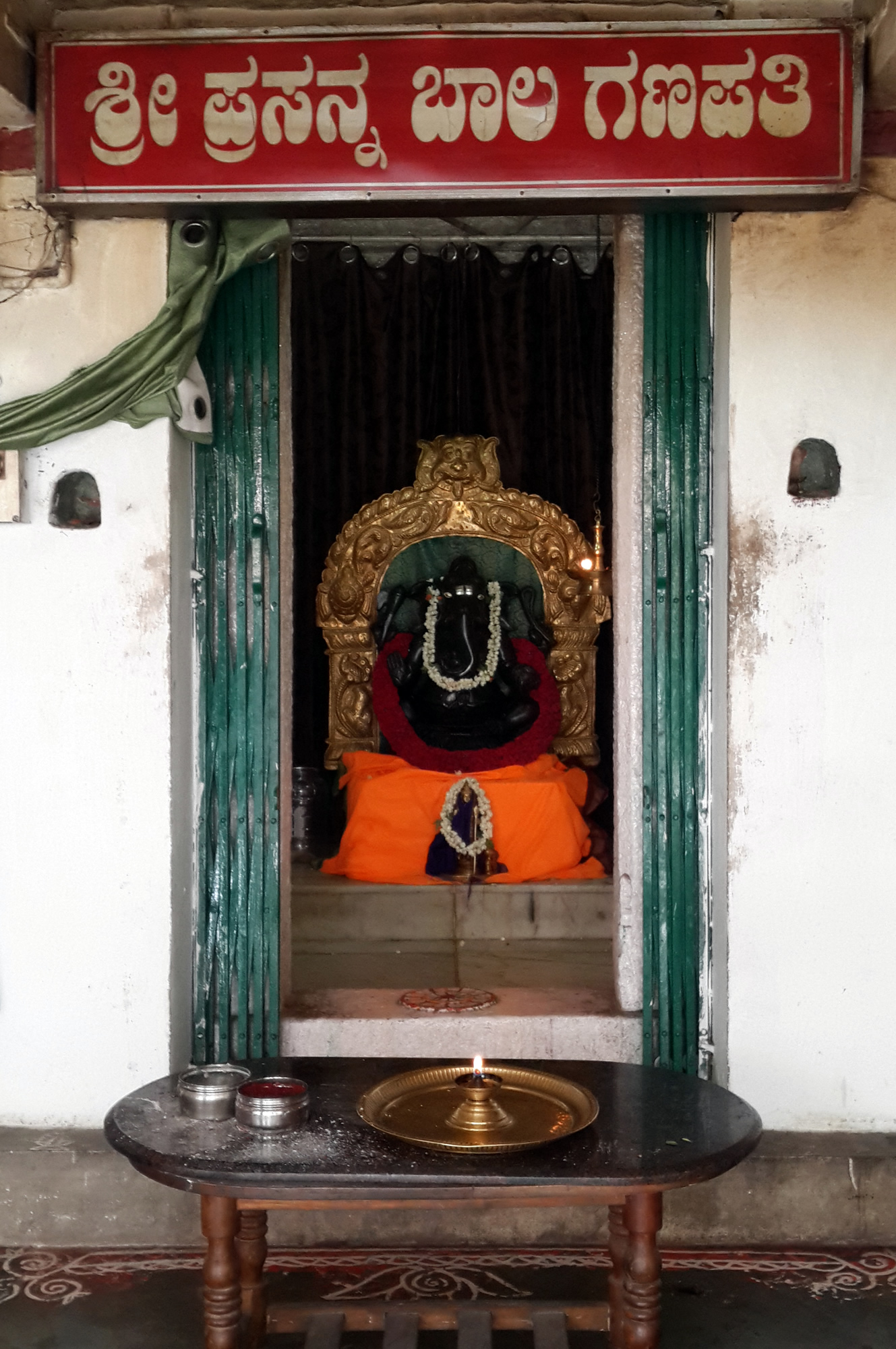
Nandi Tirtha Temple - Ganesha Shrine

There is a Navagraha platform in the corridor towards the right side of main deity.

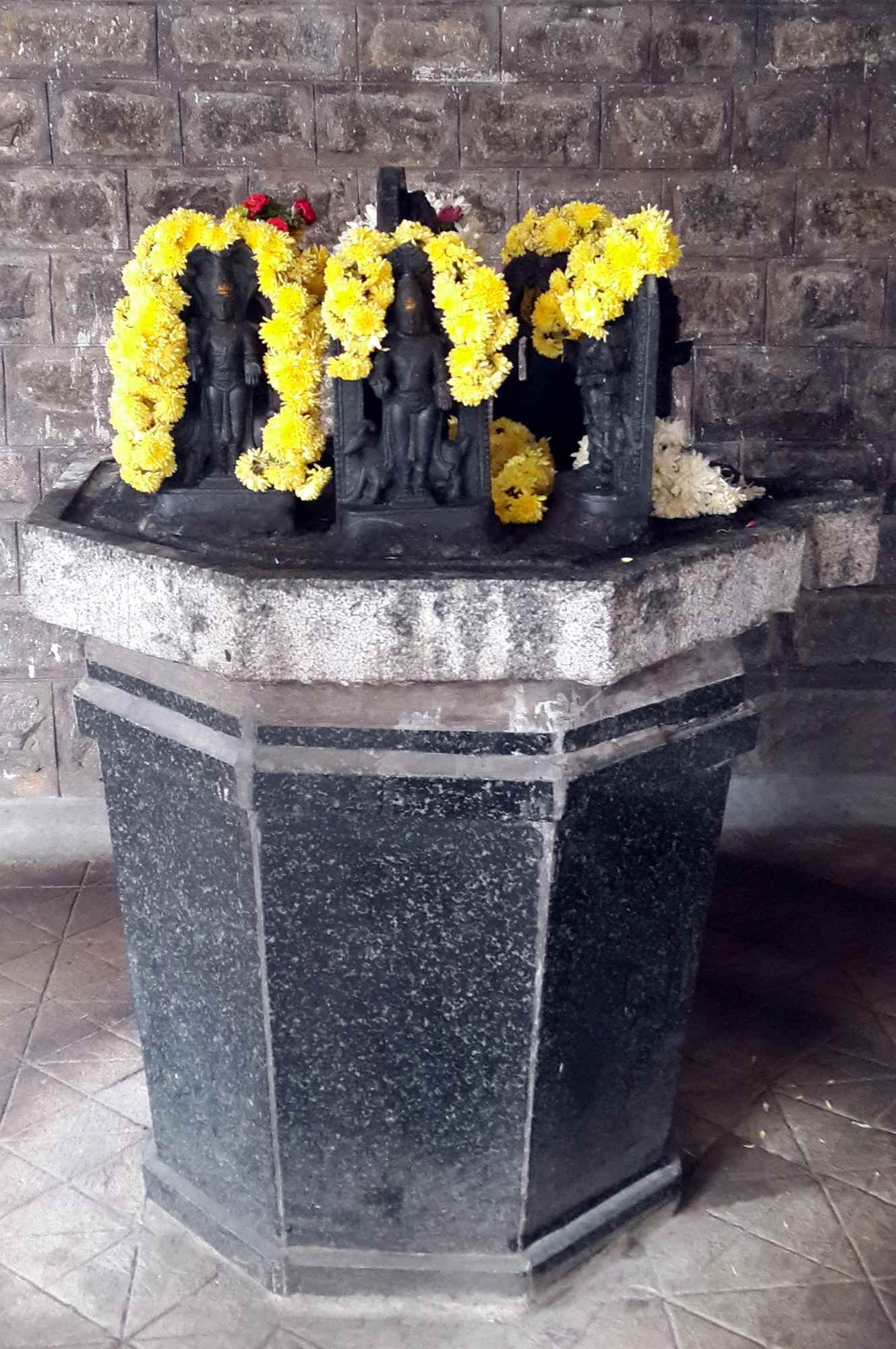
Nandi Tirtha Temple - Navagraha Shrine
