= Attara Kacheri =

Seat of the High Court of Karnataka at Bangalore

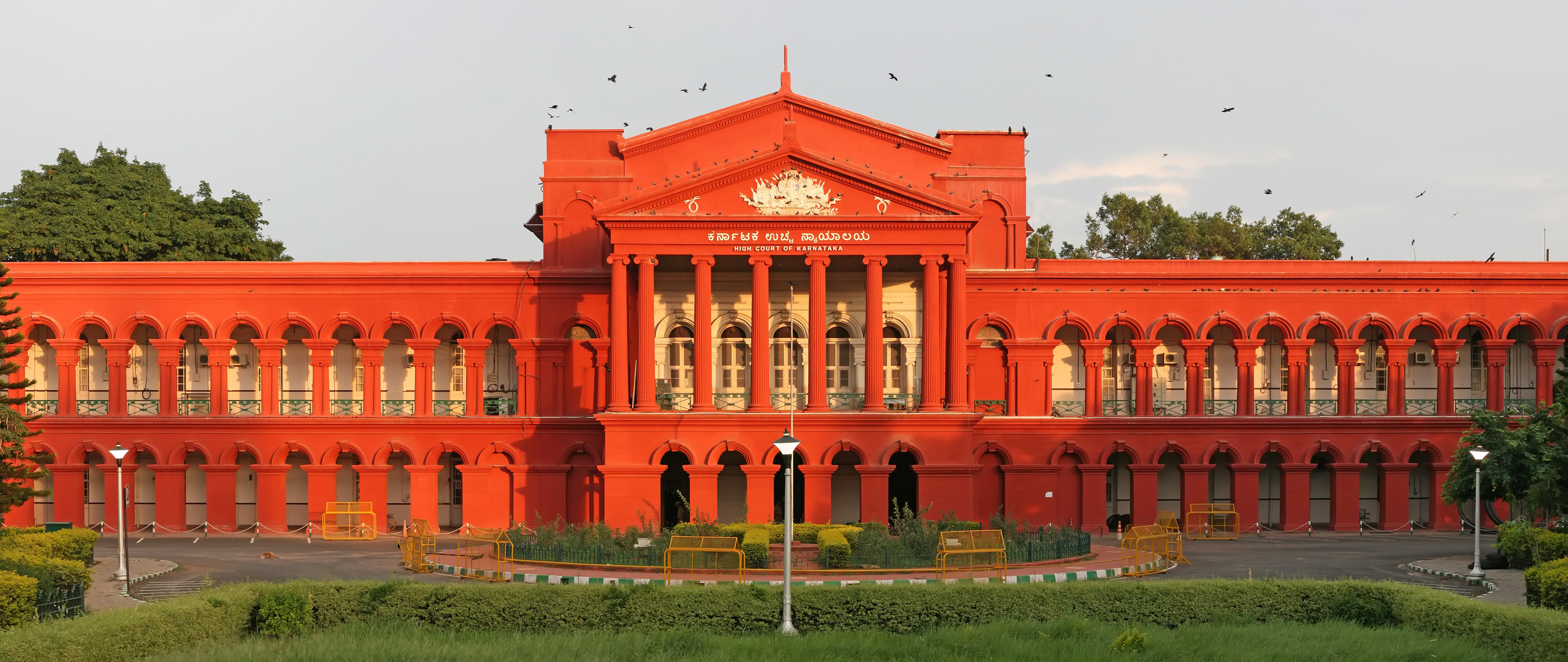
- West façade, facing Dr. B R Ambedkar Road
- Former names: Public Offices Building
- Alternative names: Karnataka High Court Building

General information
- Architectural style: Neo-classical
- Location: Cubbon Park, Bangalore, Karnataka, India
- Construction started: 1864
- Completed: 1868
- Cost: ₹427,980 (US$4,400)

Technical details
- Material: Gneiss and brick in chunam

Design and construction
- Architect: Richard Hieram Sankey
- Main contractor: Arcot Narrainswamy Mudaliar

Other information
- Public transit: BMTC bus stops: Vidhana Soudha Vidhana Soudha metro station M. S. Building; Namma Metro: Purple Dr. B.R. Ambedkar Station, Vidhana Soudha metro station

Attara Kacheri (Kannada pronunciation: [ˌʌˈtɑːrɑː kəˈtʃeːrɪ], formerly the Old Public Offices Building) in Bangalore, India, is the seat of the principal bench of the Karnataka High Court, the highest judicial authority in the state of Karnataka. It is a neoclassical red-painted stone-and-brick building in Cubbon Park, located on Dr. B. R. Ambedkar Road opposite the Vidhana Soudha. It previously housed the secretariat of the princely state of Mysore and then that of independent India's Mysore State.

== Name ==
In 1699, Chikka Devaraja Wadiyar, King of Mysore, sent an embassy to the court of the Mughal emperor Aurangzeb, then at Ahmednagar, to ensure the continuity of friendly relations between the two states after the death of Kasim Khan, the Mughal governor of Sira, with whom the Wadiyar had had a personal friendship. At Aurangzeb's court the ambassadors observed that administrative functions were divided into eighteen departments; inspired by this, the Wadiyar reorganised his own government similarly. The secretariat thus came to be called Attara Kacheri, with Attara meaning 'eighteen' and Kacheri meaning 'department' in Hindustani.

The Mysore secretariat moved into the building, which was called the Public Offices Building, upon its completion in 1868. Over time, the building itself began to be called Attara Kacheri. The building was also called 'Bowring Buildings' and 'Bowring Attara Kacheri', after the British commissioner of Mysore, Lewin Bentham Bowring, who ordered its construction.

== History ==
A revolt occurred in many parts of the Kingdom of Mysore in 1830, as a consequence of which Lord William Bentinck, the East India Company's governor-general, deprived the Wadiyar of Mysore of administrative powers in 1831, and vested the government in a British Commission. Ten of the eighteen departments of Mysore's secretariat – the Commissioner's office, the Petition Department, the Judicial Court, the treasury, the cavalry, the infantry, the Police Department, the Postal Department, the Huzur office, and the department of sandalwood – were shifted to Bangalore, where they functioned in Tipu Sultan's summer palace, which was the only building large enough to accommodate them all. The remaining eight departments, which exclusively concerned royal affairs, stayed at Mysore.

Over time, the palace was found unsuitable due to lack of space, as the offices had grown significantly since they were first shifted there, and because of fears of the building collapsing. Lewin Bentham Bowring, who took charge as Commissioner in 1862, was concerned about the safety of the treasury (worth ten lakh rupees) stored in the aging palace. Additionally, the palace was at a distance from the British cantonment, and the scattered nature of offices in the palace campus was considered a nuisance.

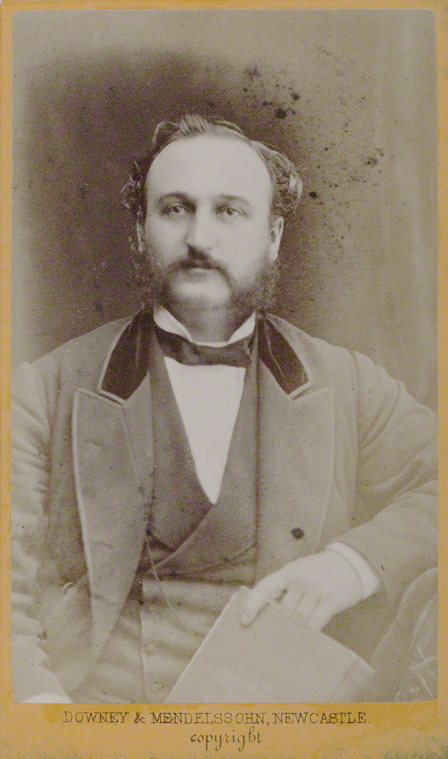
Richard Hieram Sankey, the chief engineer of the project

Plans for a new building housing all offices under one roof had been drawn up in 1857, but the project could not proceed because of the Indian Rebellion that year. Further plans had been drawn up in 1860, but were rejected by the Government of India. A revised plan by Richard Sankey, the chief engineer of Mysore, was accepted, and Bowring ordered the construction to begin.

The contract for building the structure was awarded to Messrs. Wallace and Co., who sub-contracted the work to Arcot Narrainswamy Mudaliar and Bansilal Ramrathan. Construction began in October 1864. The site, originally chosen by Mark Cubbon, facing the parade grounds of the Bangalore Cantonment, had several boulders and nullahs (large ravines), and Sankey initially found it seemingly "hopeless to do more than provide standing ground for the work". Solutions were found in building a foundation fourteen feet deep where the nullahs once were, and using large stone slabs (each around six to nine feet long) to distribute the weight of the building. Sankey reported facing some difficulties with the workers on the site, who poured mortar down the plumbing "once or twice... when the walls were well up, thus giving most serious trouble". Nevertheless, construction was completed in April 1868, at a total cost of Rs. 4,27,980, of which Rs. 3,68,981 was for the construction and the rest for purchase and levelling of the land. An equestrian statue of Mark Cubbon was installed in front of the building during construction, in March 1866. There were two expansions of the building — an annex was built in 1917 and a major extension of the entire building took place in 1995, in the same architectural style as the original. Cubbon's equestrian statue was moved to the Band Stand inside Cubbon Park in 2019.

=== Use ===
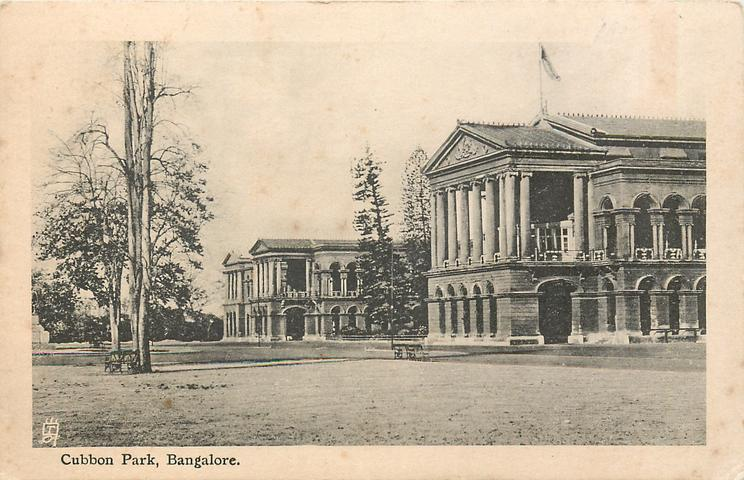
Attara Kacheri in the early 1900s

Upon the completion of construction in 1868, the administrative departments of the princely state were shifted to the building, and Tipu's palace was turned over to the city's municipality. Apart from the secretariat, the building housed the Chief Court of Mysore and the office of the Commissioner of Mysore. In 1881 came 'Rendition' — the British Indian government returned the administration of the Mysore state to the Wadiyars. The responsibilities of the Commissioner were taken over by the Dewans of Mysore, who maintained their office in Attara Kacheri. The Mysore Legislative Council was carved out of the hitherto unicameral Mysore Representative Assembly as an upper house in 1907; it held its meetings on the third floor of Attara Kacheri.

Eventually, the government offices outgrew Attara Kacheri as well; some of them were moved to another building – the New Public Offices on Nrupathunga Road – which was opened in 1921.

==== After Indian independence ====
The building continued to house the High Court and secretariat after Mysore acceded to India in 1947. Bangalore became the capital of the new Mysore State; on 24 October 1947, Attara Kacheri was a site of great public jubilation as a new cabinet composed of elected representatives was sworn in. Each house of the Legislative Assembly of Mysore held its sessions in the third floor of Attara Kacheri, with joint sessions being held in the Bangalore Town Hall. The court occupied the entire building after the legislature and the secretariat shifted to the newly built Vidhana Soudha in 1956.

The court was renamed the High Court of Karnataka when the name of the state of Mysore was changed to Karnataka in 1973.

=== Threats of demolition ===
==== 1950s ====
In the early 1950s, Kengal Hanumanthaiah, Chief Minister of Mysore, wanted to demolish the Attara Kacheri, seeing it as a vestige of colonialism. Lacking the requisite permission, he instead ordered the building of the monumental Dravidian-style legislature building, the Vidhana Soudha, at a slight elevation directly opposite the Attara Kacheri. A government committee probing concerns of overspending on the Vidhana Soudha deduced that Hanumanthaiah did so in order to "vanquish visually the Attara Kacheri building, a symbol of imperial power, in length, height and majesty."

==== 1980s ====
"[The Attara Kacheri is] precious cultural heritage and a part of an ancient legacy which any city would treasure... a symbolic connecting chord for the future, and its destruction snaps an emotional experience vital to a sense of belonging to this beautiful city."

— The petitioners in B. V. Narayan Reddy v. State of Karnataka

On 24 March 1982, the Government of Karnataka approved the demolition of the Attara Kacheri and the construction of a new court building on the site. A public interest litigation (PIL) was filed in the Karnataka High Court, pleading for the demolition to be cancelled. The case – B. V. Narayan Reddy v. State of Karnataka – was heard in the same building that was slated to be demolished.

The High Court struck down the petition on the basis that it could not change the law to make it a duty for the government to protect heritage buildings. Hearing the appeal against the High Court's decision, the Supreme Court of India asked the state government to reconsider its proposal. In 1985, the proposal to demolish the building was dropped, and repair and expansion work begun.

== Architecture ==
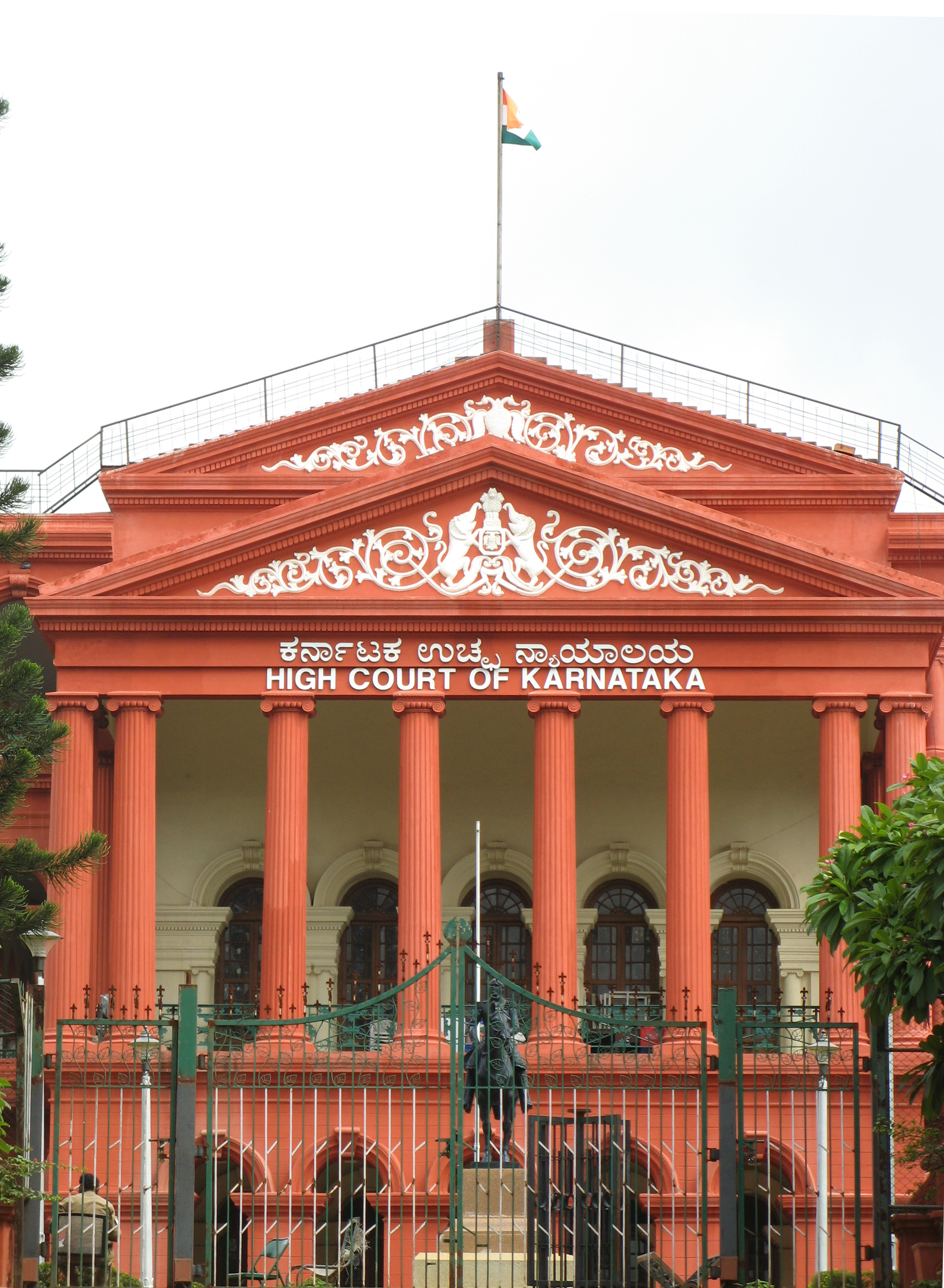
Rear facade

The Attara Kacheri has two storeys. The walls of the bottom story are built of gneiss stone in chunam (a kind of Indian cement), and those of the upper story are built of brick in chunam. The main structure of the building is surrounded on all sides by porticoes and verandahs. The entire building is surfaced with plaster and painted with red ochre. The verandahs prevent direct sunlight from reaching much of the main body of the building; despite this, the rooms are well-lit and well-ventilated.

The building is built in the neoclassical style, with Ionic porticoes on the facades of every wing, and with the wings connected by arcade-style lengths. The porticoes on either sides of the central wing each have twelve Ionic columns. The tops of the roof tiles of the wings are modelled in the style of Grecian tiles.

== Bibliography ==
- M. Fazlul Hasan (1970). Bangalore Through The Centuries. Bangalore: Historical Publications (Republished in 2023 by Metaform Design). ISBN 978-81-963415-0-3.
- A. Satyanarayana (1996). History of the Wodeyars of Mysore, 1610–1748. Directorate of Archaeology and Museums. Archived from the original on 5 January 2021.
- Ba. Na. Sundara Rao (1985). ಬೆಂಗಳೂರಿನ ಇತಿಹಾಸ [A History of Bengaluru] (in Kannada). Bangalore: Ankita Pustaka. LCCN 2012351011.
