= Kadu Malleshwara Temple =

Hindu temple in India

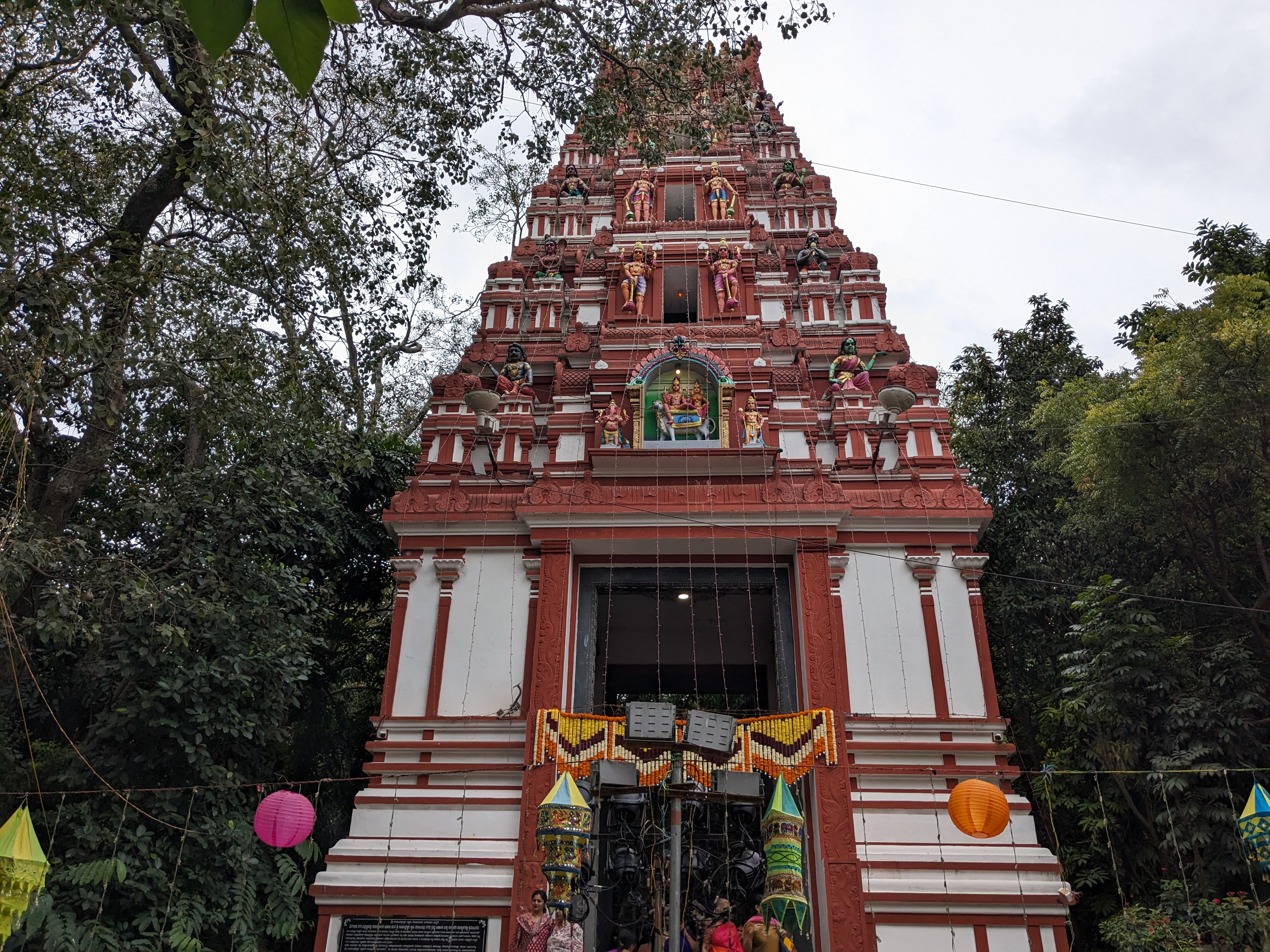

- Location in Bengaluru

Religion
- Affiliation: Hinduism
- District: Bengaluru

Location
- Location: Malleshwara locality
- State: Karnataka
- Country: India
- Interactive map of Kadu Malleshwara Temple
- Coordinates: 13.004966°N 77.5714462°E

The Kadu Malleshwara Temple (Kannada: ಕಾಡು ಮಲ್ಲೇಶ್ವರ) is a 17th-century A.D. Hindu temple dedicated to Shiva, located in the Malleshwaram locality of Bengaluru, Karnataka, India. The word 'Kadu' means forest, referring here to the thick greenery all around the temple.

== About ==
The temple was developed in the 17th century A.D. (1669 A.D.) by Venkoji, the step-brother of the Maratha King Shivaji in Dravidian style of architecture. Shiva is worshipped as Mallikarjun. One part of the temple, Nandishwara Teertha Temple (Basava Theertha), is in front of the temple. It is said to be the main source or birthplace of the Vrishabhavathi River.

== Architecture ==
Kadu Malleshwara Temple is in the Dravidian engineering style and constructed during the reign of King Venkojirao Bhonsle of Thanjavur.

== Festivals ==
The main annual festival is Shivaratri. Thousands of devotees from Bengaluru and around visit this temple on the holy day of Shivratri festival.

== Connectivity ==
The temple is located in Malleswaram locality of Bengaluru. Bengaluru is well connected by air, road, and railways. It can be reached via air at Bangalore International Airport which is located at a distance of 40 km from the city. Bengaluru receives various trains from all over India and is well connected by roadways.
