= Yele Mallappa Shetty Lake =

Body of water in Bangalore

- Veerenahalli Kere; Yele Mallappa Shetty Lake
- ಎಲೆ ಮಲ್ಲಪ್ಪ ಶೆಟ್ಟಿ ಕೆರೆ (Kannada)
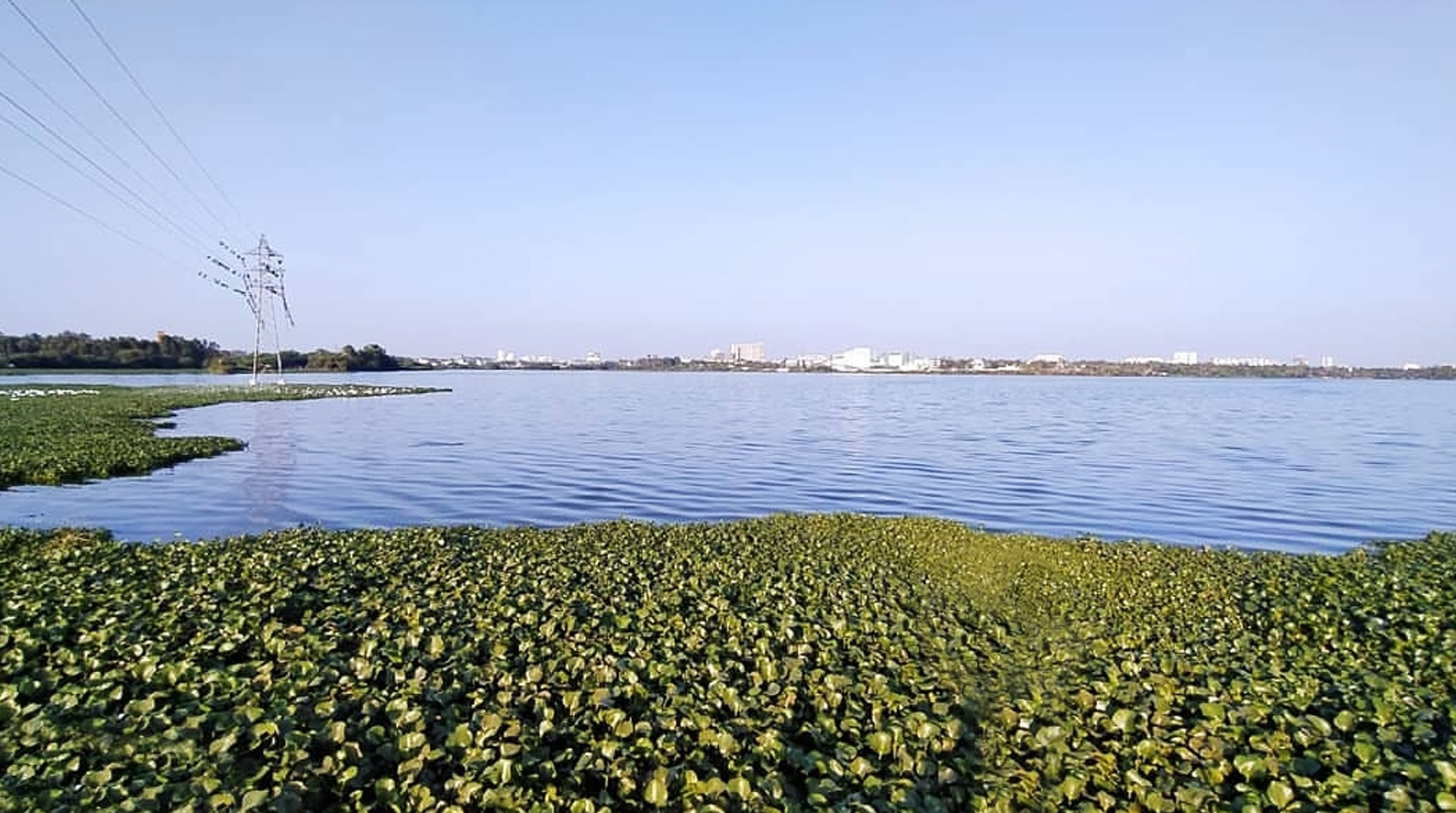
- Yele Mallappa Shetty Lake

- Location of the lake in Karnataka Yele Mallappa Shetty Lake (India)
- Location: Bangalore, Karnataka, India
- Coordinates: 13°01′24.6″N 77°43′45.2″E
- Type: Perennial lake, stale water
- Etymology: Named after Yele Mallappa Shetty
- Primary inflows: Rainfall and city drainage
- Built: 1870’s
- Surface area: 508 acres (205.6 ha)
- Max. depth: 3 metres (9.8 ft)
- Shore length^{1}: 3 km (1.9 mi)
- Surface elevation: 903 m (2,962.6 ft)
- ^{1} Shore length is not a well-defined measure.

Yele Mallappa Shetty Lake is one of the largest lakes in Bangalore, located on the eastern side of the city, outside of Krishnarajapura. It is an artificial water reservoir constructed in early 1900s. The lake is spread over 490 acres (198.3 ha).

== Geography ==
The lake is located in North-East Bangalore, near Whitefield. The 260 acre Yele Mallappa Shetty lake is one of the largest lakes in Bangalore. The lake has the Old Madras Road passing through it.

== History ==
Yele Mallappa Shetty Lake derives its name from a leading philanthropist of 1900s by the name of Yele Mallappa Shetty. In the late 19th century when the city was suffering from a great drought, Yele Mallappa Shetty, a betel leaf merchant, generously donated a large part of his wealth to the construction of a tank to harvest rainwater and provide respite to the people.

Due to rapid growth of Bengaluru urban area, Yele Mallappa Shetty Lake has been getting encroached over the time. The multi-storey apartments in its watershed region, which are constantly feeding stormwater drains completely but are also letting untreated sewage directly into it. Even industries from surrounding areas started dumping their waste into the lake.

In December 2017 a sewage treatment plant at Seegehalli was inaugurated to help treat 15,000,000 litres (4,000,000 US gal) of sewage water per day (MLD) generated at Krishnarajapura, Hoodi, Mahadevapura, Bhattarahalli, Devasandra, Sadaramangala and Medhalli. Currently, the Bangalore Water Supply and Sewerage Board supplies treated sewage to neighboring regions such as Chikkaballapur, Kolar and Anekal for irrigation purpose.

== Water quality ==
In 2015 a study on water quality at the lake was conducted. With regard to the lakes physico-chemical characteristics, observations were made three times in a year representing three different seasons. The samples were collected from three different places of the lake.

Following are the observations from the report:

- Physico-chemical analysis: Lake water contains different types of floating, dissolved, suspended and microbiological as well as bacteriological impurities
- Temperature: Neither too high nor too low
- pH: Normal range
- Electrical Conductivity (EC): Higher side; indicating higher levels of alkalinity
- Dissolved oxygen (DO): Lower than the standard
- Bio-chemical Oxygen Demand (BOD): Moderate
- Chemical oxygen demand (COD): Exceeded the limit in most of the samples. It clearly indicates the presence of high levels of dissolved contaminants
- Hardness: Very high
- Alkalinity: Higher side
- Sodium: Concentration of sodium was found to be lower
- Potassium: The concentration of potassium was high
- Phosphate: Comparatively high amount of phosphate was recorded due to the discharge of municipality sewage and dumping of domestic waste into the lakes
- Nitrate: Relatively larger amount of nitrate was found

== Flora and fauna ==
The lake is a biological hotspot for migratory birds, some of the usually spotted birds are golden oriole, northern shoveler, Asian green bee-eater, bulbul, pied kingfisher, egrets, and Eurasian coot. A species from the genus Oscillatoria and water hyacinth were found dominant in a 2015 study.
