= Vrishabhavathi River =

River in India

Location
- Country: India
- State: Karnataka
- District: Bengaluru Urban, Ramanagara

Physical characteristics
- Source: Big Bull Temple
  - location: Basavanagudi, Bangalore, India
  - coordinates: 12°56′34″N 77°34′5″E
  - elevation: 933 m (3,061 ft)
- 2nd source: Kadu Malleshwara Temple
  - location: Malleshwaram, Bangalore
- Mouth: Arkavati River
  - location: Doddamudavadi, Ramanagara, India
  - coordinates: 12°35′56″N 77°24′17″E
  - elevation: 638 m (2,093 ft)
- Length: 52 km (32 mi)approx.
- Basin size: 360.62 km^{2} (139.24 sq mi)

Basin features
- Tributaries
  - right: Paschimavahini

The Vrishabhavathi River is a minor river, a tributary of the Arkavathi, that flows through the south of the Indian city of Bangalore. The river was once so pristine that the water from it was used for drinking and used by the famous Gali Anjaneya temple but is now highly polluted due to pollutants from industrial, agricultural and domestic sources.

== Etymology ==
Vrishabhavathi is derived from the Sanskrit word Vrishabha which refers to a bull. The river is believed to originate at the feet of the monolithic Nandi statue at the Big Bull Temple in Basavanagudi, hence giving it the name Vrishabhavathi.

== Origin & Course ==
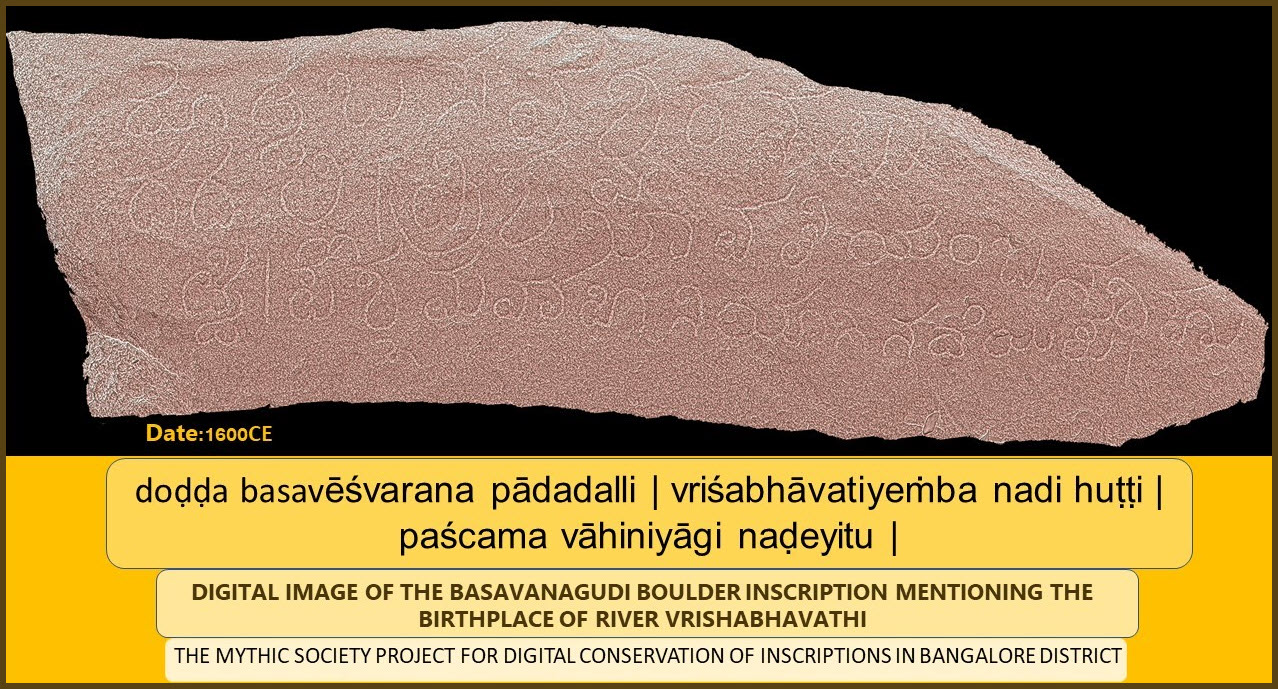
Inscription dated to the 16th century mentioning that the river originates at the feet of Basaveshwara at the Big Bull Temple

The origin of the river has different references. A report by the Indian Institute of Science (2017), first says the river originates at Bull temple, a small hillock next to Dodda Ganapathi Temple in Basavanagudi. Then it goes on to say that the river originates near Sankey tank, Sadashivanagara. Then again, for the third time, the Indian Institute of Science report says the river originates at Nandi temple in Basavanagudi.

The river has a basin area of 890 sq.kms and passes through 96 out of the 198 wards in Bangalore.including major neighbourhoods like Basavanagudi, Girinagar, Hosakerehalli, Nayandahalli, Rajarajeshwari Nagar and Kengeri carrying out sewage and stormwater. It can be seen near the Mantri Mall Malleswaram, Magadi Road and Mysore Road metro stations. There is a reservoir named after itself Vrishabhavathi Reservoir near Bidadi. It joins Arkavathi River upstream of Kanakapura as a tributary.

== Religious significance ==
There are several temples throughout the course of the river. Some of the well-known temples along the banks on the Vrishabhavathi are Dodda Ganesha and the Dodda Basava Temple, Gali Hanumantha Temple, Gavi Gangadhareshwara temple and the Kadu Malleshwara Temple. The Gali Hanumantha Temple is over 600 years old, constructed in 1425 by Sri Vyasaraya of Channapattana who was a Rajaguru of Vijayanagara Empire. The temple was constructed on the confluence of two rivers – Vrishabhavathi and Paschimavahini. The Ishwara Temple at Kengeri dates back to 1050 AD.

== Pollution and current concerns ==
The river is highly polluted due to pollutants from industrial, agricultural and domestic sources. It is said to be dark, smelly and frothy due to "untreated or badly treated domestic sewage that goes into the river."

In 2005, the then Chief Minister of Karnataka, Dharam Singh proposed to remodel the river valley to include widening of the river, and adopt measures to prevent inundation.
