= Ba. Na. Sundara Rao =

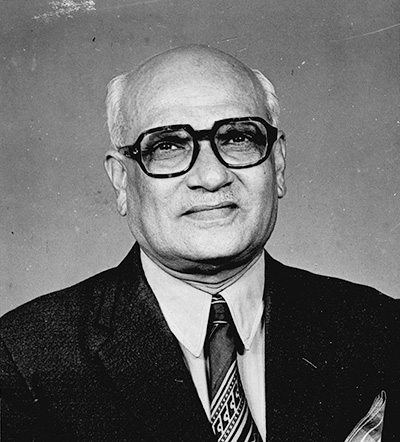
- Born: 26 March 1918; Varthur, India
- Died: 8 October 1986 (aged 68)
- Occupation(s): Author and Journalist
- Years active: 1945 to 1986
- Notable work: "ಬೆಂಗಳೂರಿನ ಇತಿಹಾಸ" Bengalurina Itihasa, History of Bangalore from Founding until Indian Independence; and "ಕರ್ನಾಟಕದ ವೀರ ಯೋಧರು" Karnatakada Veera Yodharu, Brave Warriors of Karnataka.
- Spouse: Kannada Author S. N. Rathnamma (married 1943)
- Children: 5

Balagere Narasimhamurthy Sundara Rao or Ba. Na. Sundararao (26 March 1918 – 8 October 1986), who wrote poetry under the pen name Vanavihari, was known by his Kannada initials as Ba.Na.Sum.. Banasum was active in Kannada literary circles from the 1950s until his demise in 1986, and is well known as an author, historian, and journalist.

A prolific writer, he authored 25 Kannada books including "Bengalurina Itihasa", one of the few authentic sources on the history of Bengaluru from founding till Indian independence. He also wrote and published biographies of notable people of Karnataka, several travelogues, short stories, poems and many articles in various periodicals. He was a great orator and gave lectures on history, literature, education and the Indian freedom movement.

As a Kannada historian, Banasum published "Banglodaya", a book about the creation of Bangladesh; and "Bharata-Pakistana Samarada Itihasa" History of Indo-Pak War; the books demanded considerable labour and his meetings with the military personnel at various levels culminated in another monumental work on the biographical sketches of one hundred warriors from Karnataka who fought in the Indo-Pakistani War of 1971, some of whom lost their lives in the war. The book "Karnatakada Veera Yodharu" (Kannada: ಕರ್ನಾಟಕದ ವೀರಯೋಧರು) (Brave Warriors of Karnataka), was released in 1972 by General K. M. Cariappa. He also wrote biographies of Sir M. Visveswaraiah, Cha. Vasudevayya (teacher of Sir M.V.), and of notable dramatist Bellave Naraharishastri.

As a novelist, Banasum documented the struggles of the people of Bengaluru who could not enjoy the freedom on 15 August 1947. The Mysore Wodeyars had to be coaxed in to joining the Indian Democratic Government, and that resulted in a movement entitled "Chalo Mysore" (Kannada: ಚಲೋ ಮೈಸೂರು) (March to Mysore). Centered on this movement, he penned a historical novel with this title, and published it in 1984.

Sundararao gave a lecture series on the history of Bengaluru at the Secretariat Club in Cubbon Park during the 1980s. The lecture notes were compiled into the nucleus of a book, and turned into his magnum opus, Bengalurina Itihasa, which was released in 1986 by Chief Editor of the Karnataka State Gazetteer Dr. Suryanath U. Kamath. The book was published after many years of laborious research in government archives and after researching relevant archeological artefacts located all over the city and surrounding rural areas. This book is considered as an authentic source on the history of Bengaluru.

Ba. Na. Sundararao was felicitated for lifetime contribution to Kannada literature by literary persons, students and well-wishers at the Kannada Sahitya Parishat, in June 1986. A fest-shrift entitled "Vanavihari" (Kannada: ವನವಿಹಾರಿ) also was published, documenting his achievements. Soon after this he suffered a fatal cardiac arrest, which abruptly ended an eventful life. Ba. Na. Sum's birth centenary was celebrated in 2018, when public interest was revived, and his contribution to Kannada literature was hailed.
