= S. Ramaswami Mudaliar =

Indian merchant (1840–1911)

Raja Sir Savalai Ramaswami Mudaliar KCIE
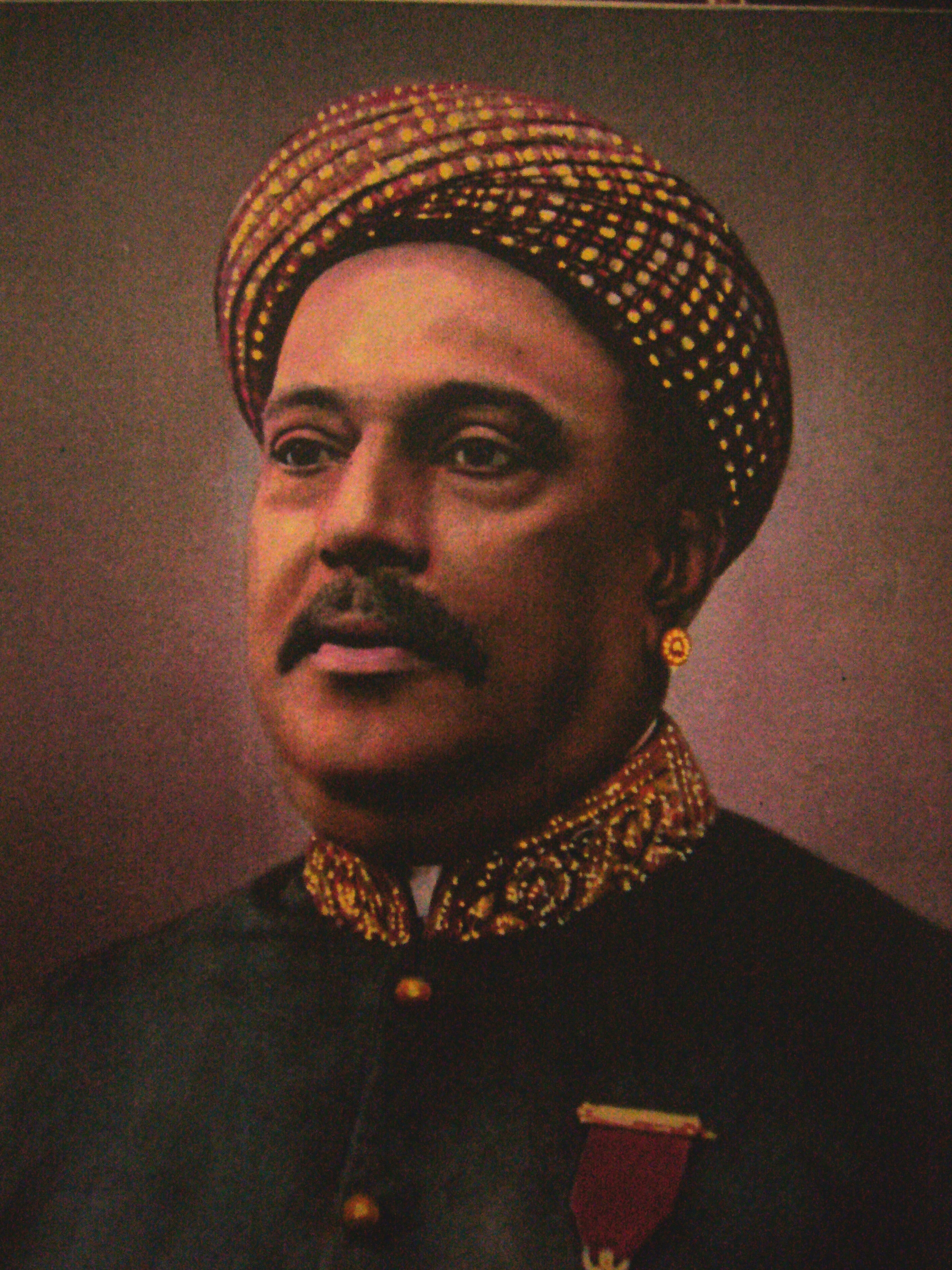

Municipal Commissioner, Madras
- In office 1877

Vice President, Madras Mahajana Sabha

Sheriff of Madras - First Indian & Tamilian
- In office 1886, 1887, 1905

First President of Suguna Vilasa Sabha

Committee member of Indian Famine Charitable Relief Fund
- In office 1897

Trustee of Pachaiyappa's Trust Board
- In office 1895-1906

Member of Madras Chamber of Commerce - 1905

Personal details
- Born: 13 October 1840 Pondicherry
- Died: 6 March 1911 (aged 70) Madras
- Spouse(s): Ranee Thayyal Nayagi Ammal, Lady Janaki Ammal

Rao Bahadur Raja Sir Savalai Ramaswami Mudaliar CIE (1840–1911) was an Indian merchant, dubash, politician and philanthropist who was known for his wealth. He was also one of the early leaders of the Indian National Congress. In 1886, he became the 158th Sheriff of Madras, making him the very first Indian to ever be appointed to that prestigious position.

== Early life ==
Ramaswami Mudaliar was born in 1840 to a building contractor in a Sengunthar family from Pondicherry. His father had been declared insolvent and moved to Madras in order to escape creditors.

Ramaswami Mudaliar joined Dymes and Co. and soon rose to become its dubash, amassing a huge fortune.

== Philanthropy ==
Mudaliar was known for his philanthropic activities in the Madras Presidency. He was reported to have spent over Rs.44,000/- to feed starving people flocking into Madras during the famine of 1876-78. He established various choultries in memory of his first wife, Ranee Thyal Nayagi Ammal, as well as hospitals in Madras, Royapuram, Thirukazhgukundram, Cuddalore, and Kanchipuram. He built a child-care hospital in Cuddalore which is presently being maintained by the municipality.

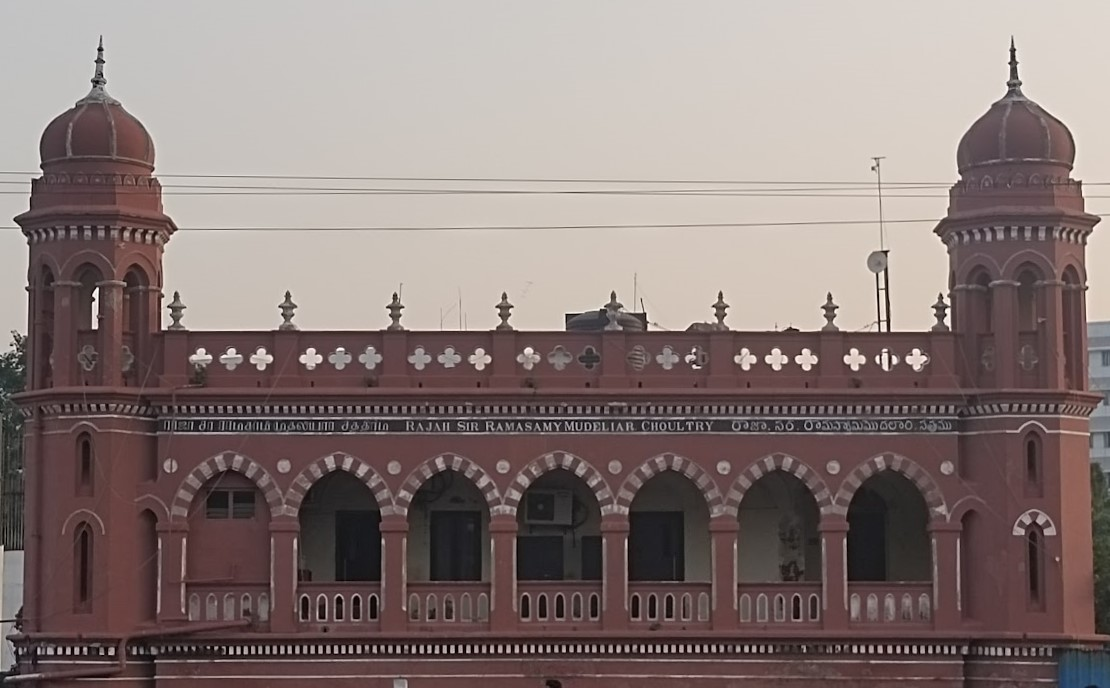
Rajah Sir Ramasamy Mudeliar Choultry (Opp Central Railway Station, Chennai)

In 1884, Mudaliar started a choultry near Chennai Central railway station. This Choultry survived till the 1960s, later taken over by AG &OT of Madras High Court. The charities remain active. The Women and Children hospital at Kozhikode was established in 1903 by Raja Sir Ramaswamy Mudaliar, in memory of Queen Victoria, and was handed over to the Government on 22 September 1903.

In 1902, Mudaliar was chosen to represent the city of Madras at the coronation of King Edward VII and Queen Alexandra scheduled for June that year.

The coronation was postponed when the king fell ill, and Mudaliar returned to India in July, missing the rescheduled coronation the following month.

== Indian Independence Movement ==
Mudaliar was associated with the Indian National Union and was a part of its 1885 three-member delegation to England. He was also associated with the Indian National Congress in its early stages.

Mudaliar participated in the third session of the Indian National Congress held at Madras in 1887. He was a part of the welcoming committee. A resolution was moved demanding more representation for Indians in the administration. Mudaliar endorsed the resolution and spoke:

Gentleman, while we are humbly praying out Government to grant us some small representative element in the Government, we have actually got full-blown representative institutions flourishing in this country under our very noses. I do not know whether you are aware how they are flourishing in Pondicherry and other places which are subject to the French government. England will not as yet allow us the smallest modicum of representative institutions, but in Pondicherry every man has a right to elect his representative. He enjoys manhood suffrage!

On the third day of the Madras session, Mudaliar moved an amendment suggesting that the question of establishing a Public Service Commission be postponed to the next session. Mudaliar also participated in the fifth session of the Indian National Congress held in 1889. He participated in subsequent sessions of the Indian National Congress. In the 1894 Congress, he proposed Alfred Webb for the presidency of the Congress and he was duly elected.

== Death ==
Mudaliar died in 1911 at the age of 71 and was buried at his private burial ground at Kilpauk Garden Road, Kilpauk, Chennai. His statue was erected by his friends and is kept in the Choultry.

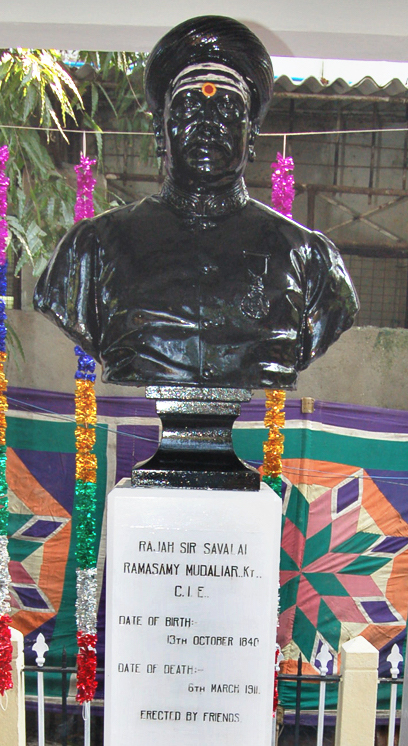
RSRM Bust erected by friends at his Choultry

== Legacy and honours ==
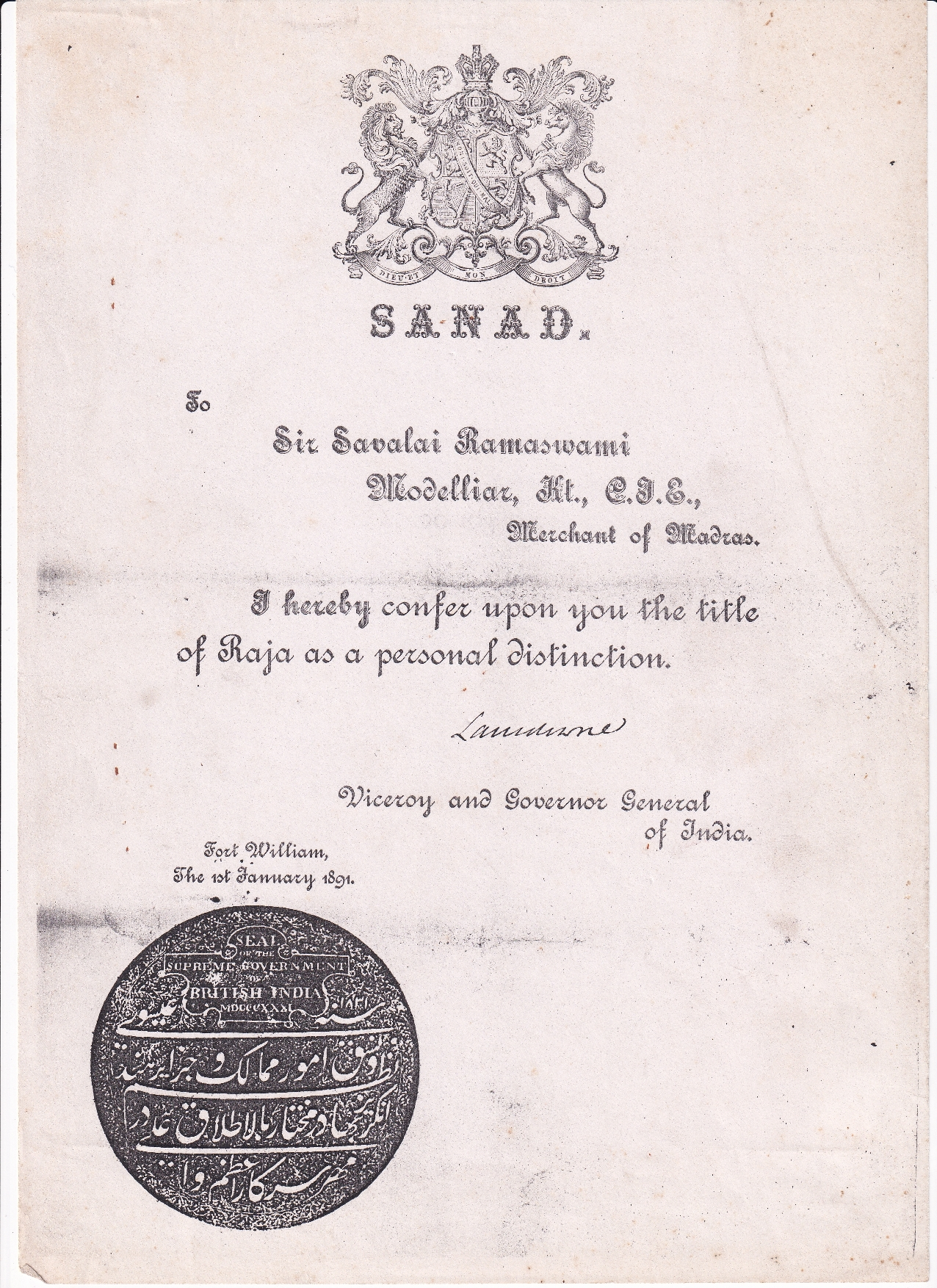
The title of Raja conferred on Sir Savalai Ramaswami Mudaliar Kt.C.I.E

Ramaswami Mudaliar was made a Companion of the Order (C.I.E) of the Indian Empire on 6 June 1885. He was also awarded the title of "Rao Bahadur". In 1886, he became the 158th Sheriff of Madras, the first Indian to hold the post. He was knighted on 14 February 1887 in the Queen's Golden Jubilee Honours List. The title of Raja was conferred upon him as a personal distinction, i.e. it was not hereditary since he was a non-royal, by Her Most Gracious Majesty. It was conferred on 1 January 1891 at Fort William by the Marquess of Lansdowne, Viceroy and Governor General of India

Mudaliar's birth anniversary was traditionally commemorated with an annual public function at the Rajah Sir Ramaswamy Mudaliar (RSRM) Choultry, located opposite the Chennai Central Railway Station. Following the acquisition of the Choultry property by the Chennai Metro Rail Limited (CMRL) for the Central Square Project in 2014, the venue was relocated; the function is currently held on the premises of the Madras High Court. The annual event is organized by the Rajah Sir Ramaswamy Mudaliar Choultry Trust, which is jointly managed by the Administrator General and Official Trustee (AG & OT) of Tamil Nadu and Mudaliar's great-grandson, Co-Trustee N.Dheeraj Kumar.

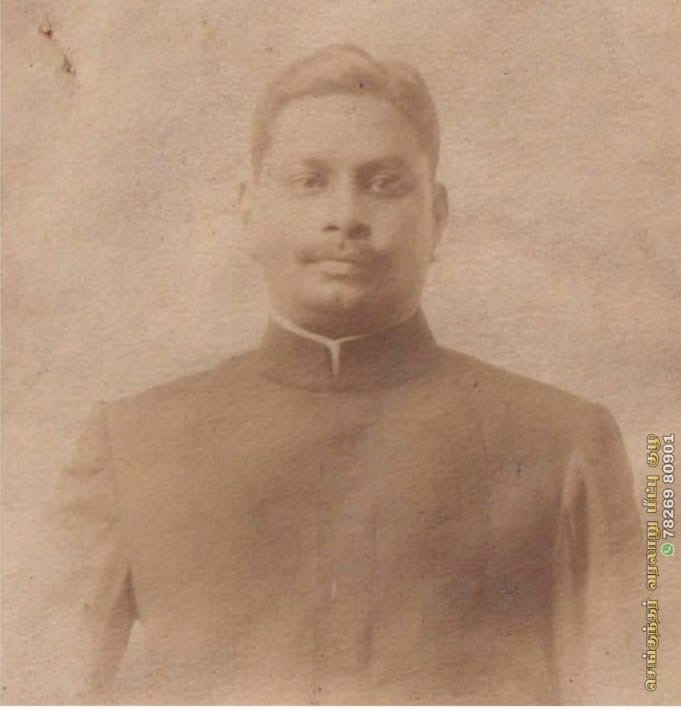
Son of Rajah Sir Savalai Ramaswami Mudaliar, Director - Buckingham & Carnatic Mills Co., Ltd., Imperial Bank of India
