= Sajjan Rao =

Indian businessman

Rao Bahadur Sajjan Rao (1868–1942) was a businessman and philanthropist from Bengaluru who was well known for his charities, educational institutions, hospitals, and hostels for the underprivileged.

== Early life ==
Sajjan Rao was born in Taggalla, Maddur in 1868 to a poor family. He traveled from Maddur to Bengaluru to work with his maternal uncle Bojagade Venkataraya and became one of the richest man in Bengaluru by 1926.

== Notable works ==
- He built Subramanya Swamy temple, choultry at Sajjan Rao Circle.
- The maternity block at Vanivilas Women and Children Hospital in Bengaluru is named after him as a token of gratitude for his 50,000 rupees donation in 1930 which was demanded by Diwan Sir Mirza Ismail.
- He built roundabout at Sajjan Rao circle on the demand by the corporation to facilitate hassle free traffic movement.
- He has also constructed a dispensary at Sajjan Rao circle which he donated to the corporation in 1909.
- In 1909, he built a free hostel dedicated to his maternal uncle Venkat Rao Bhojagade which is called as Maratha hostel at present.
- He has also constructed educational institution for the poor students as well as the school for disabled.

== Recognition ==
- He was awarded with the title Dharma Prakasha by King of Mysore in recognition of his social work .
- The circle near [V.V.PURAM] is named after him as Sajjan Rao Circle.
- Also, the road in V V Puram is named after him as Sajjan Rao road.

== Death ==
Sajjan Rao died in 1942. He is buried near the Gavi Gangadhareshwara Temple in Gavipuram.
