= History of Bengaluru =

Account of past events in Bengaluru, Karnataka India

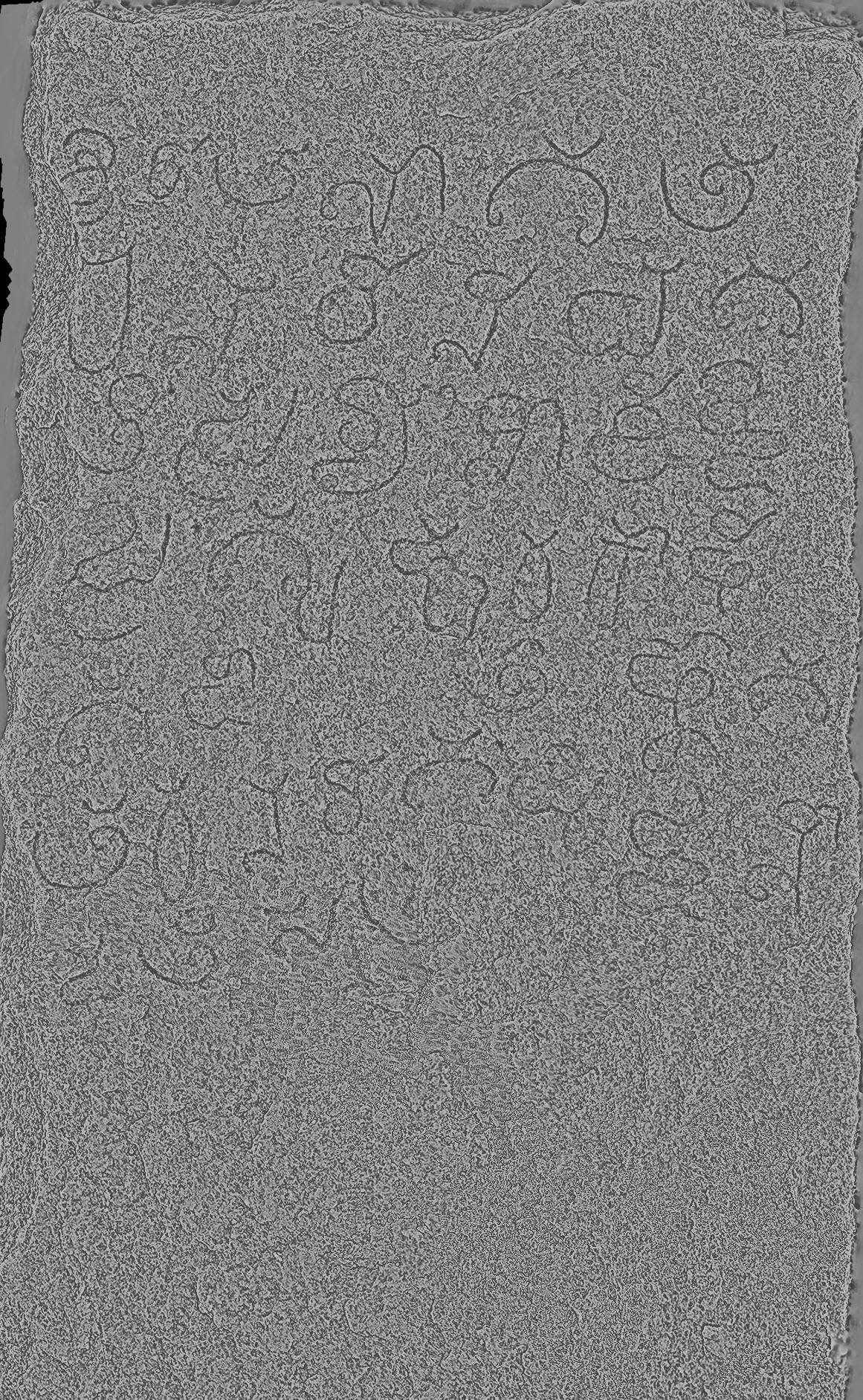
Inscription stone at Beguru, Bengaluru, dated to the 9th century CE mentioning the name "Bengaluru" for the first time

Bengaluru is the capital city of the state of Karnataka. Bengaluru, as a city, was founded by Kempe Gowda I, who built a mud fort at the site in 1537. But the earliest evidence for the existence of a place called Bengaluru dates back to c. 890.

== Medieval period ==
The oldest inscription in current-day Bengaluru is the Hebbal-Kittayya inscription, which dates back to the Ganga dynasty in Karnataka and mentions the administration of Sripurusha. Carved in early Kannada script, it pays tribute to Kittayya, who was martyred defending his land in a battle during Sripurusha's reign. The Gangas ruled Gangavadi from Kolar starting c. 350 and later shifted their capital to Talakadu.

The first mention of the name Bengaluru, albeit in the form 'Benguluru' is from an inscription in Begur dated to 9th century AD. Written in Halegannada (ancient Kannada), it mentions 'Bengaluru Kadana' (battle of Bengaluru). The inscription stone found near Begur reveals, that the district was part of the Ganga Kingdom ruled from Gangavadi until 1024 AD and was known as 'Benga-val-oru', the City of Guards in old Kannada.

Edgar Thurston (Castes and Tribes of India Volume 5) states that the Kongu region was ruled by a series of twenty eight kings before being conquered by the Cholas of Tanjore, citing the earliest portion of the Kongu Chronicle - Kongu Desa Rajakkal (a manuscript in The Mackenzie Collection) which gives a series of short notices of the reigns of all the kings who ruled the country from the start of the Christian era till its conquest by the Cholas. These kings belonged to two distinct dynasties: the earlier line of the Solar race which had a succession of seven kings of the Ratti tribe, and the later line of the Ganga race, itself claimed to be a branch of the Solar race.

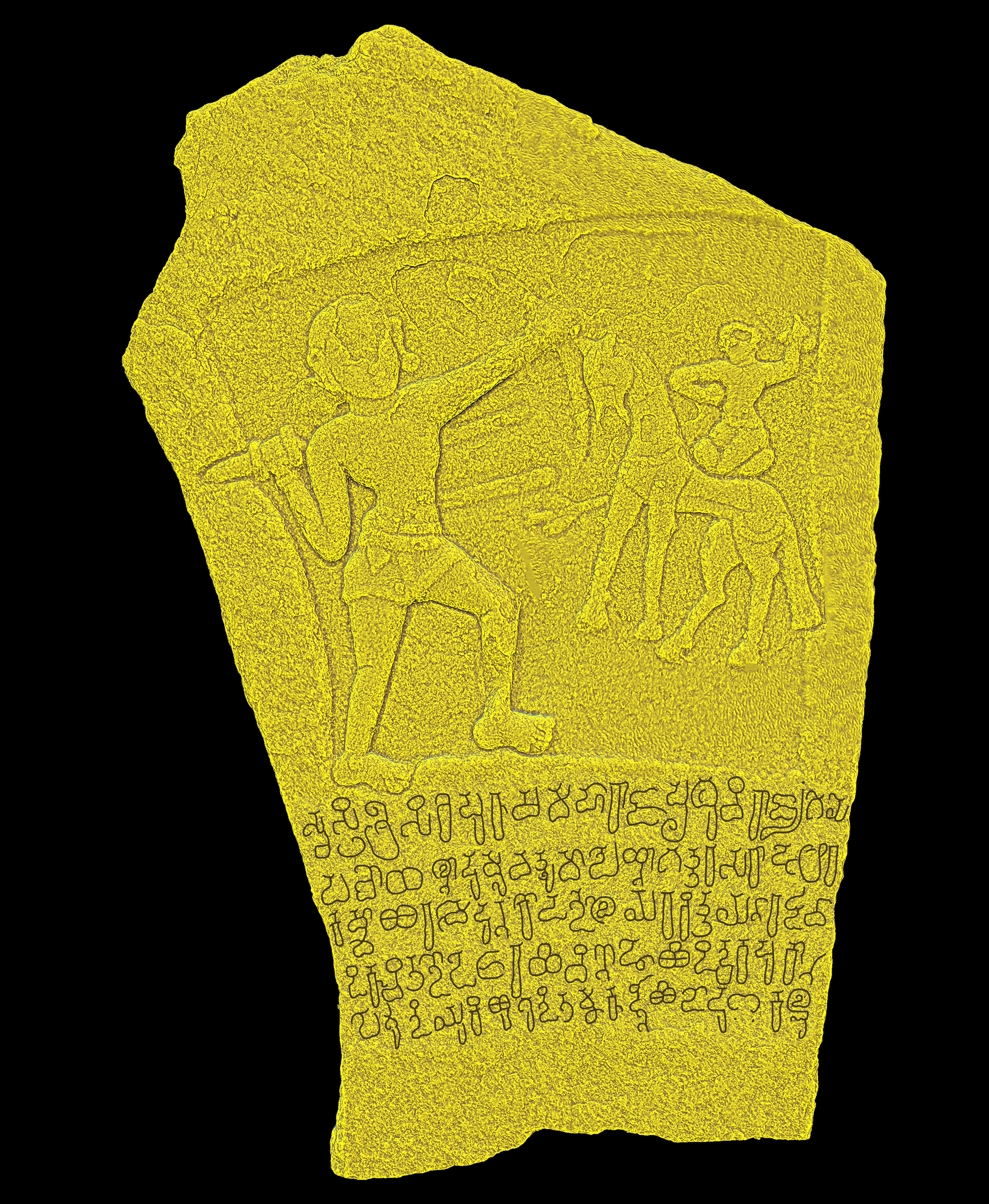
The Hebbal-Kittayya inscription stone dated to 750 AD found in Hebbal, Bengaluru

In 1024 AD, the Chola Empire captured the city. Today, little evidence can be seen of this period. A small village in south Bangalore and one in Anantapur district bear the Chola name but the residents are of native stock. The later Gangas often fought alongside the Chalukyas, Rastrakutas and the Hoysalas. In 1117 AD, the Hoysala king Vishnuvardhana defeated the Cholas in the battle of Talakad which led to the Hoysalas regaining control of Talakad.

== Vijayanagara and Kempe Gowda ==
Kempe Gowda I, Modern Bangalore was founded by a feudatory of the Vijayanagara Empire, who built a mud fort in the year 1537. Kempe Gowda also referred to the new town as his "gandu bhoomi" or "Land of Heroes". Within Bangalore, the town was divided into petes (IPA: [pete]) or market. The town had two main streets: Chikkapete Street ran east–west and Doddapete Street ran north–south. Their intersection formed Doddapete square – the heart of then Bangalore. Kempe Gowda's successor, Kempe Gowda II, built temples, tanks including Kempapura and Karanjikere tanks and four watching towers that marked Bangalore's boundary. There is an inscription dated 1628 C.E in the Ranganatha Temple in Telugu. The English translation of which is "Be it well, When Rajadhi-Raja-Parameshwara Vira Pratapa Vira-Maha-Deva Maharaya seated in the Jewel throne was ruling the empire of the world: When of the Asannavakula, the Yelahanka Nadu Prabhu Kempanacharya-Gauni's grandson Kempe Gowda's son, Immadi Kempegaunayya was ruling a peaceful kingdom in righteousness with the decline of the Vijayanagar empire, the eclipse of the rule of Yelahanka Nadu Prabhus took place at the dawn of the 17th century."

The four watchtowers built at the time in Bangalore are still seen today in the following places which are :

- Lal Bagh Botanical Garden
- Kempambudhi Tank
- Ulsoor Lake
- Mekhri Circle

== Sultanate of Bijapur and Marathas ==
It was captured by the Maratha chief Shahaji Bhosale, father of Chhatrapati Shivaji Maharaj, then working for the Adil Shahi sultans of Bijapur in 1638. Ekoji, half brother of Shivaji also ruled the Jagir of Bengaluru, one inscription called the Ekoji's Mallapura Mallikarjuna temple Donation inscription in Malleshwaram dated to 1669 CE documents the donation of a village Medaraninganahalli for the upkeep of the Kadu Malleshwaram temple. During the siege of Bangalore, Chhatrapati Shivaji Maharaj's elder brother Sambhaji/Shambhuji was killed by Afzal Khan by incumbents of Mudhol State, for which Shivaji was to later exact revenge.

== Mughal Influence ==
After conquering the Sultanate of Bijapur, the Mughals under the command of Khasim Khan, then arrived in Bangalore, which was ruled by Shivaji's brother Venkoji/Ekoji Bhonsale. Ekoji, who faced the prospect of losing his jagir to the Mughals, made an offer to sell Bangalore to Chikka Devaraja Wodeyar in 1689 for three lakhs. Later, Bangalore was given as a personal jagir by the then Woedeyar King Krishnaraja Wadiyar II to his dalvoy Hyder Ali in 1759. But by 1761, Hyder Ali had become a de facto Ruler and was proclaimed as the Sarvadhikari(Regent) of the Kingdom.

== Hyder Ali and Tipu Sultan ==
When Hyder Ali died in 1782, his son Tipu Sultan deposed the Wodeyar, proclaimed himself Sultan. Under Tipu Sultan and Hyder Ali, the state progressed economically and trade flourished with many foreign nations through the ports of Mangalore. Several attempts by the British to capture Bangalore were repulsed by the Mysorean Army, most notably in 1768 when Hyder Ali forced Colonel Nicholson of the British Army to lift his siege of Bangalore. The French under Napoleon had promised to drive the British from India. Tipu successfully stalled the British in the first, second and third Anglo-Mysore Wars.

Bangalore fort was captured by the East India company armies under the command of company governor general, Charles Cornwallis, on 21 March 1791 during the Third Anglo-Mysore War and formed a centre for British resistance against Tipu Sultan, being incorporated into the British Indian Empire after Tipu Sultan was defeated and killed in the Fourth Anglo-Mysore War (1799). A prominent role was played by the Madras Sappers in the capture of the Fort and subsequent development of the cantonment and the city. Bangalore is the permanent home of this Indian Army regiment since the mid-nineteenth century.

== Wodeyars and British East India ==
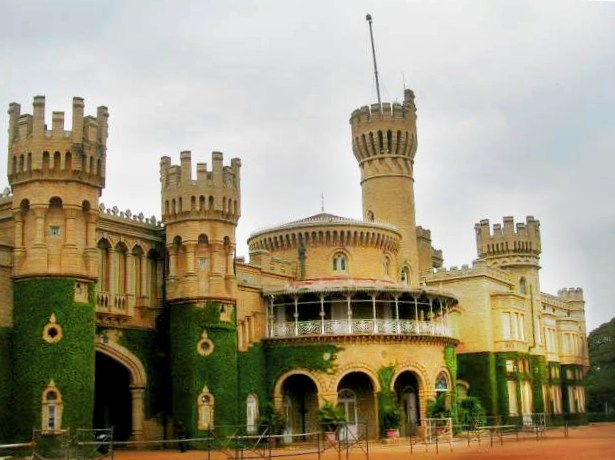
Bangalore Palace, built in 1887, was home to the rulers of Mysore

Upon the passing of Tipu Sultan, the Wodeyars returned to the throne of Mysore, and therefore Bangalore, although only as figureheads. Bengaluru remained part of British East India until Indian independence in August 1947.

The 'Residency' of Mysore State was first established at Mysore in 1799 and later shifted to Bengaluru in the year 1804. It was abolished in the year 1843 only to be revived in 1881 at Bengaluru and finally to be closed down in 1947 with the departure of the British. (https://web.archive.org/web/20120206190404/http://rajbhavan.kar.nic.in/history/fromresi-rajbhavan.htm)

The British troops which were first stationed at Srirangapatna after the fall of Tipu Sultan in 1799 were later shifted to the Civil and Military Station of Bangalore in 1809.

The salubrious climate of Bangalore attracted the ruling class and led to the establishment of the famous Military Cantonment, a city-state close to the old town of Bangalore. The area became not only a military base for the British but also a settlement for a large number of Europeans, Anglo-Indians and missionaries.

In Cantonment, the names of many of its streets are derived from military nomenclature — Artillery Road, Brigade Road, Infantry Road and Cavalry Road. The South Parade (now known as Mahatma Gandhi Road) was to the south of the Parade Ground. The Plaza theatre was constructed in the year 1936 on the South Parade and was used by the soldiers for viewing Hollywood movies. The British representative maintained a residence within the cantonment area and his quarters was called the Residency and hence the name Residency Road. Around 1883, three developments were added to the cantonment – Richmond Town, Benson Town and Cleveland Town.

The Cantonment has retained it distinct atmosphere through the years with large populations of Anglo-Indians and Tamils from the British era.

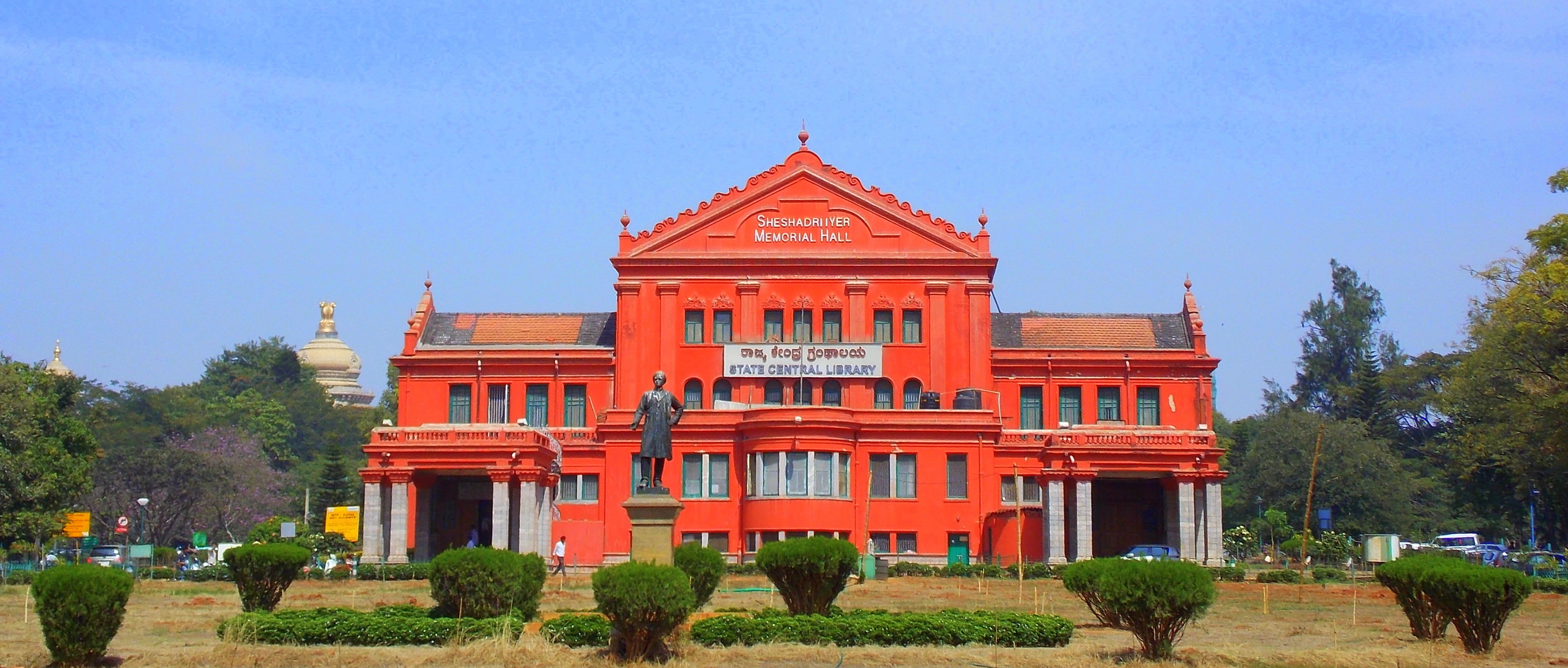
Central Library

=== Water shortages ===
The lack of water supplies within the city of Bangalore was first tackled in 1873 by building a chain of tanks called Miller's Tanks in the Cantonment area. Prior to this water was pumped from the Halsoor, Shoolay and Pudupacherry tanks which were insufficient for the Civil and Military Station. The city area drew water from a Karanjee system from Dharmambudhi and Sampangi tanks. The Great Famine of 1875-77 and the failure of the monsoons led to drying of all these water bodies. During this time water carriers Bihistis supplied water. In 1882 the Sankey Reservoir was constructed at the cost of ₹5.75 Lakhs by Richard Hieram Sankey and collected rain water from an area of 2.5 square miles (6.5 km^{2}). The water was said to be unsavoury and impure. On 23 June 1896 water was pumped from the Chamarajendra Reservoir (Hessarghatta) which dammed the waters of the Arkavathi. This tank went dry for one year in 1925. It was built at the cost of ₹20,78,641. On 15 March 1933, the Thippagondanahalli Reservoir was put into service. On 21 May 1961, the Integrated Water Supply Scheme was inaugurated. This system collected water from the Cauvery river near Halgur and pumped up at Thorekadanahalli, Voddaradoddi, Gantakanadoddi and Tatguni and stored in reservoirs at Mount Joy, Byrasandra and High Grounds.

=== Plague-Crisis of 1898 ===
Bangalore was hit by a plague epidemic in 1898. The epidemic took a huge toll and many temples were built during this time, dedicated to the goddess Mariamma. The crisis caused by this epidemic catalyzed the improvement and sanitation of Bengaluru and, in turn, improvements in sanitation and health facilities helped to modernize Bengaluru.

Telephone lines were laid to help coordinate anti-plague operations. Regulations for building new houses with proper sanitation facilities came into effect. A health officer was appointed in 1898, the city was divided into four wards for better coordination and the Victoria Hospital was inaugurated in 1900 by Lord Curzon, Viceroy and Governor-General of British India.

=== 1900s ===
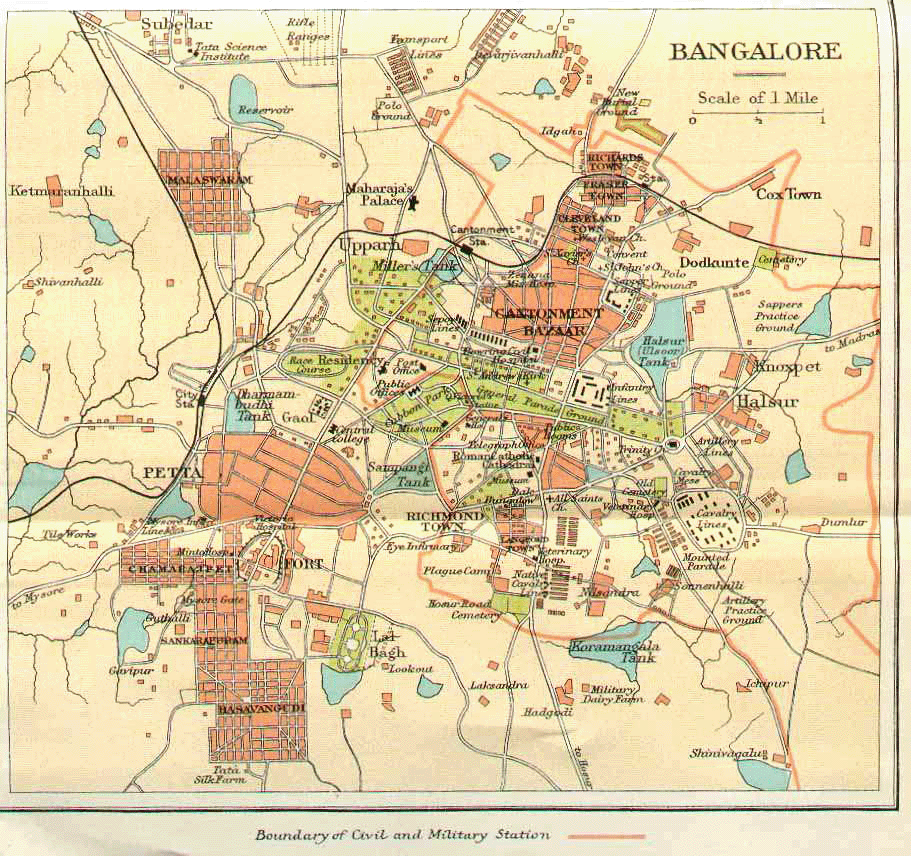
Bangalore city map, circa 1924 from "Murray's 1924 Handbook", with the pete and Cantonment areas clearly visible.

Sometimes it is claimed that, in 1906, Bangalore became the first city in Asia to have electricity, supplied by the hydroelectric plant situated in Shivanasamudra. This information is controversial, as the first electric power supply was started in Kolkata in the year of 1898, to the then Bank of Bengal.

Basavanagudi (named either after the Basavanna Temple or the Bull Temple in the village of Sunkenahalli) and Malleshwaram (named after the Kadu Malleshwara Temple in the old Mallapura village) were created during this time. Kalasipalyam (near the old fort) and Gandhinagar were created between 1921 and 1931.

Bangalore's reputation as the Garden City of India began in 1927 with the Silver Jubilee celebrations of the rule of Krishnaraja Wodeyar IV. Several projects such as the construction of parks, public buildings and hospitals were instituted to improve the city. Bangalore therefore served traditionally as a retreat for people from the surrounding South Indian regions. Even today, the city administration manages to maintain several parks. Cubbon Park and Lal Bagh are two such examples.

== Indian Independence (1947) ==
After Indian independence in August 1947, Bangalore remained in the Mysore State of which the Maharaja of Mysore was the Rajapramukharu.

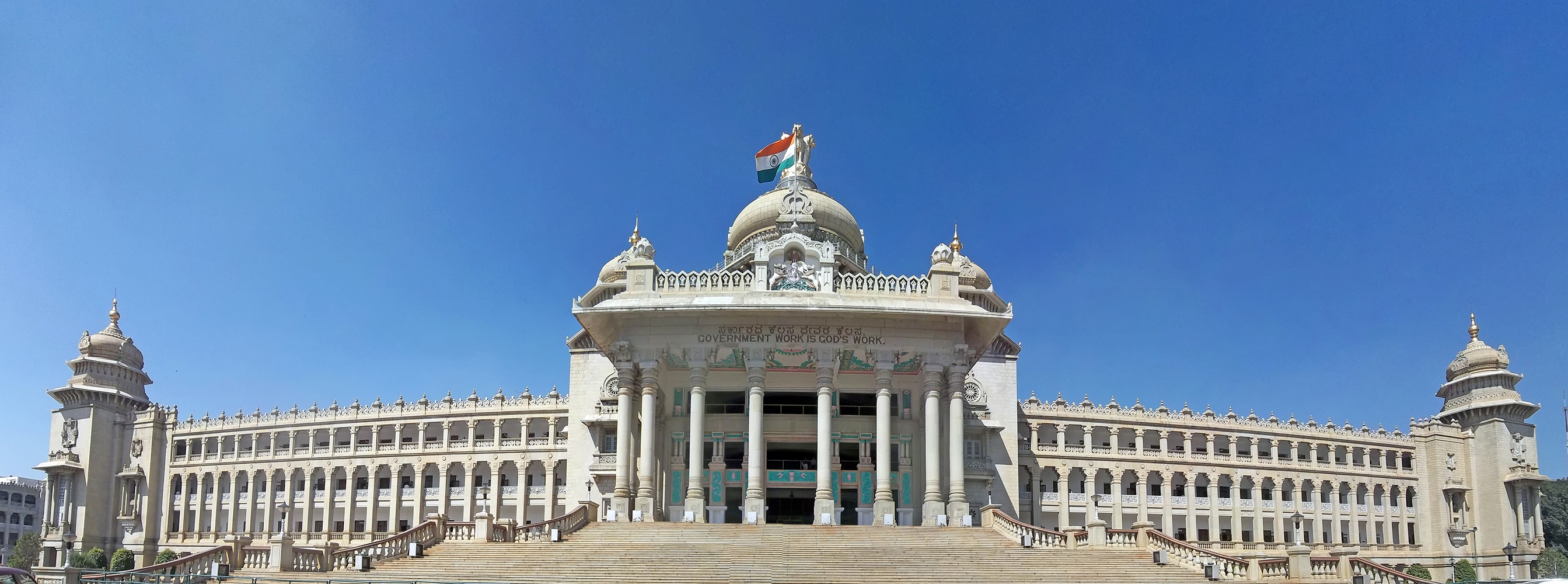
The Vidhana Soudha

Bangalore continued to be the capital of the unified and linguistically homogeneous Kannada-speaking new Mysore state that was created in 1956, and renamed to Karnataka in 1973.

Kumara Park came into existence in 1947 and Jayanagar in 1948. In the 1960s and 1970s an elite neighborhood was developed in the former gardens of the Bangalore Palace, which was known as "Palace Orchards" now called Sadhashivnagar. The area is now home to many of the wealthy members of Bangalore society, celebrities and politicians.

Public sector employment and education provided opportunities for Kannadigas from the rest of the state to migrate to the city. In the decades that followed, Bangalore's manufacturing base continued to expand with the establishment of private companies such as MICO (Motor Industries Company), which set up its manufacturing plant in the city. Industrialization created further growth that extended from the Peenya Industrial Area in the west to Indiranagar and Whitefield in the east; from Yelahanka Town in the north, to J.P. Nagar in the south.

=== 1991 Economic Reforms ===
Bangalore experienced a growth in its real estates e market in the 1980s and 1990s, spurred by capital investors from other parts of the country who converted Bangalore's large plots and colonial bungalows into multi-storied apartments. In 1985, Texas Instruments became the first multinational corporation to set up base in Bangalore. Other information technology companies followed suit, and, by the end of the 20th century, Bangalore had firmly established itself as the Silicon Valley of India.

With an estimated population of 8.5 million in 2011, Bangalore is now the fourth most populous city in India and the 28th most populous city in the world. Bangalore was the fastest-growing Indian metropolis after New Delhi between 1991 and 2001.

In 2005, the Government of Karnataka announced it had accepted a proposal to rename Bangalore to Bengaluru. In 2006, the Bruhat Bengaluru Mahanagara Palike (BBMP), the third level of government, passed a resolution to implement the proposed name change. However, this process had been stalled due to delays in getting clearances from the Union Home Ministry. In 2014, Union ministry approved the name change to Bengaluru.

Historical population
Year	Pop.	±%
1871	142,513	—
1881	155,857	+9.4%
1891	180,366	+15.7%
1901	159,030	−11.8%
1911	189,485	+19.2%
1921	237,496	+25.3%
1931	306,470	+29.0%
1941	406,760	+32.7%
1951	778,977	+91.5%
1961	1,199,931	+54.0%
1971	1,653,779	+37.8%
1981	2,913,537	+76.2%
1991	3,628,165	+24.5%

== See also ==
- History of India
- Bengaluru
- Bengaluru Pete
- Mysore State
- Malleshwaram
