= Bengaluru geography and environment =

Bengaluru is situated in the southeast of the South Indian state of Karnataka. It is positioned at 12.97° N 77.56° E and covers an area of 2,190 square kilometres (850 sq mi). A landlocked city, Bengaluru is located in the heart of the Mysore Plateau (a region of the larger Deccan Plateau) at an average elevation of 920 metres (3,020 ft). Bangalore district borders with Kolar and Chikkaballapur in the northeast, Tumkur in the northwest, and Mandya and Ramanagaram in the southeast.

== Geography ==
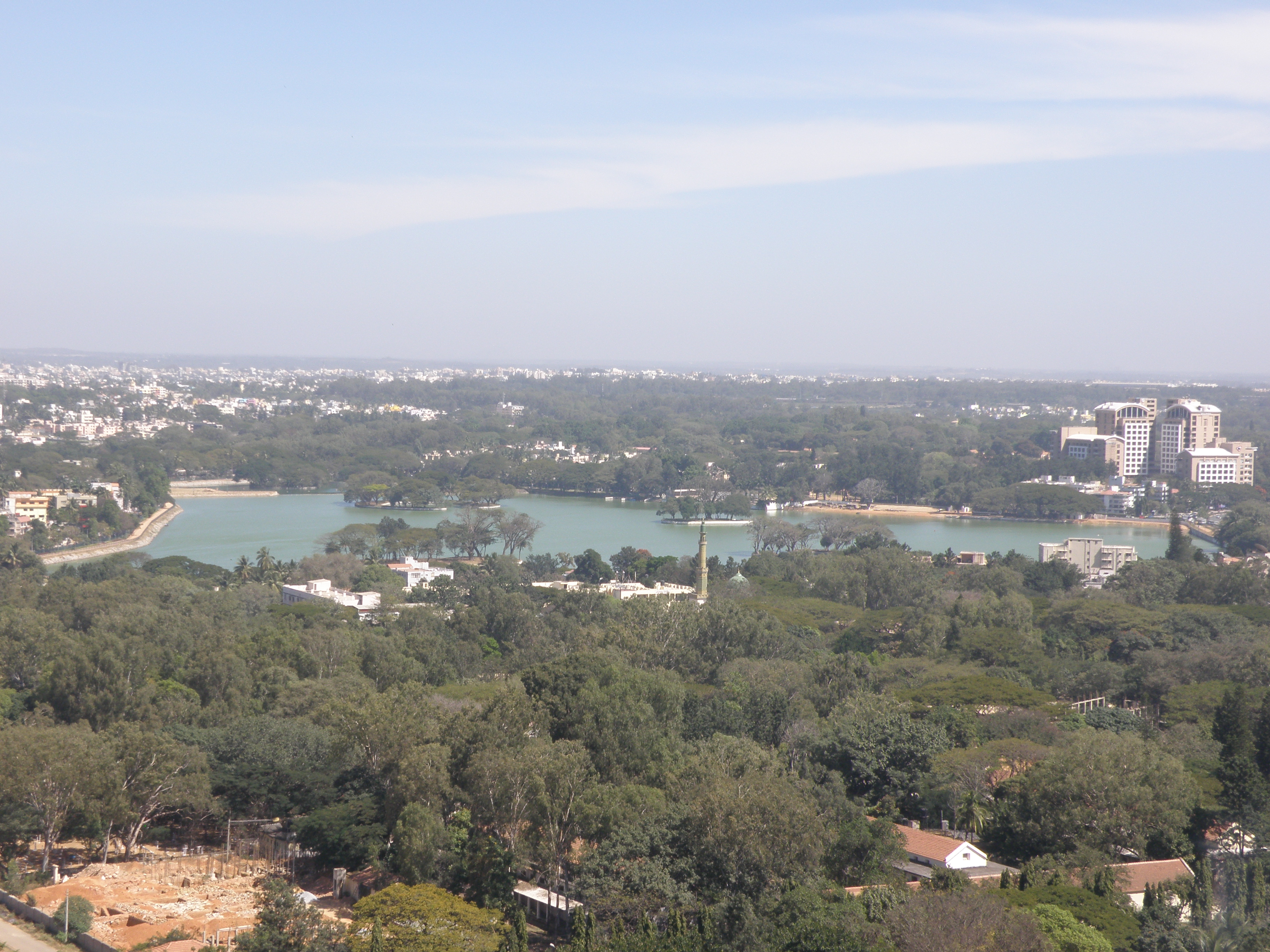
Halasuru lake, seen from Public Utility Building in MG Road.

Bangalore lies in the southeastern part of the South Indian state of Karnataka. It is in the heart of the Mysore Plateau (a region of the larger Precambrian Deccan Plateau) at an average elevation of 920 m (3,020 ft). It is positioned at 12.97°N 77.56°E and covers an area of 1741 km^{2} (673 mi^{2}). The majority of the city of Bangalore lies in the Bangalore Urban district of Karnataka and the surrounding rural areas are a part of the Bangalore Rural district. The region comprising the Bangalore Urban and Rural districts is known as the Bangalore (region). The Government of Karnataka has carved out the new district of Ramanagara from the old Bangalore Rural district.

In the 16th century, Kempe Gowda I constructed many lakes to meet Bangalore's water requirements. The Kempambudhi Kere, since overrun by modern development, was prominent among those lakes. In the earlier half of 20th century, the Nandi Hills waterworks was commissioned by Sir Mirza Ismail (Diwan of Mysore, 1926–41 CE) to provide water supply to the city. Currently, the river Kaveri provides around 80% of the total water supply to the city with the remaining 20% being obtained from the Thippagondanahalli and Hesaraghatta reservoirs of the Arkavathi river. Bangalore receives 800 million liters (211 million US gallons) of water a day, more than any other Indian city. However, Bangalore sometimes does face water shortages, especially during the summer season — more so in the years of low rainfall. A random sampling study of the air quality index (AQI) of twenty stations within the city indicated scores that ranged from 76 to 314, suggesting heavy to severe air pollution around areas of traffic concentration.

Bangalore has a handful of freshwater lakes and water tanks, the largest of which are Madivala tank, Hebbal Lake, Ulsoor Lake and Sankey Tank. Groundwater occurs in silty to sandy layers of the alluvial sediments. The Peninsular Gneissic Complex (PGC) is the most dominant rock unit in the area and includes granites, gneisses and migmatites, while the soils of Bangalore consist of red laterite and red, fine loamy to clayey soils.

Vegetation in the city is primarily in the form of large deciduous canopy and minority coconut trees. Though Bangalore has been classified as a part of the seismic zone III, it has experienced quakes of magnitude as high as 6.4.

=== Topography ===
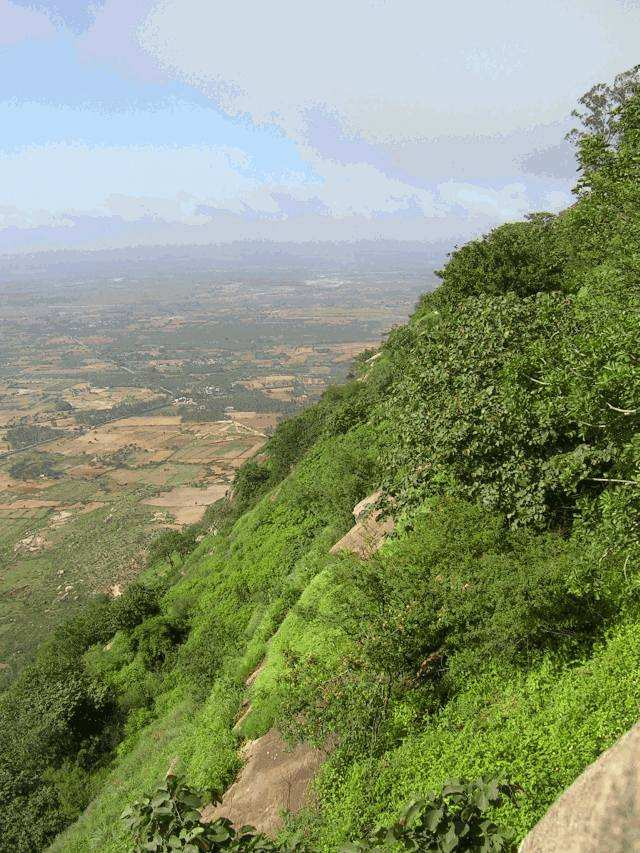
The slopes of the Nandi Hills, located 60 km north of Bangalore.

Bangalore has two unique Topography terrains—North Bangalore taluk and the South Bangalore taluk. The North Bangalore taluk is a relatively more level plateau and lies between an average of 839 to 962 meters above sea level. The middle of the taluk has a prominent ridge running NNE-SSW. The highest point in the city, Doddabettahalli, (962m) is on this ridge. There are gentle slopes and valleys on either side of this ridge. The low-lying area is marked by a series of water tanks varying in size from a small pond to those of considerable extent, but all fairly shallow.

The topography of Bangalore is undulating with a central ridge running NNE-SSW. The highest point is Doddabettahalli, which is 962 m (3,156 ft) and lies on this ridge. No major rivers run through the city, though the Arkavathi and [Dakshin Pinakini river] cross paths at the Nandi Hills, 60 km (37 mi.) to the north. River Vrishabhavathi, a minor tributary of the Arkavathi, arises within the city at Basavanagudi and flows through the city. The rivers Arkavathi and Vrishabhavathi together carry much of Bangalore's sewage. A sewerage system, constructed in 1922, covers 215 km^{2} (133 mi^{2}) of the city and connects with five sewage treatment centers located in the periphery of Bangalore. Outflow from Bellandur lake and Varthur lake valleys go to Ponnaiyar river that flows towards Hosur.

The South Bangalore taluk has an uneven landscape with intermingling hills and valleys. The southern and western portions of the city consist of a topology of granite and gneissic masses. The eastern portion is a plane, with rare minor undulations.

There are no major rivers flowing through the city. However, rivers Arkavathi and Kaveri merge within the proximity of Mekedatu, which lie 60 km south of Bangalore. River Vrishabhavati, a tributary of Arkavathi, flows for a small stretch in the Bangalore North taluk and carries a bulk of the city's sewerage. The age old South Pennar river, also known as Dakshina Pinakini, used to run through the eastern side of the city. Now it is being considered for renewal and rejuvenation by the government. The city has a handful of freshwater lakes and water tanks such as Madivala tank, Hebbal tank, Ulsoor lake and Sankey Tank. Groundwater occurs in silty to sandy layers of alluvial sediments and jointed quartzite.

The rock types prevalent in the district belong to the Saugar, Charnokite and Peninsular Gneissic Complex (PGC) groups. The PGC is the dominant group of rocks and covers two-thirds of the area and includes granites, gneisses and migmatites. The soils in Bangalore vary from red laterite to clayey soils.

== Climate ==
Bangalore

Climate chart (precipitation, max. and min. temperature)
J	F	M	A	M	J	J	A	S	O	N	D
1.9 28 16	5.4 31 18	19 33 20	42 34 22	107 33 22	107 30 20	113 28 20	147 28 20	213 29 20	168 28 20	49 27 18	16 27 16
- █ Average max. and min. temperatures in °C
- █ Precipitation totals in mm
Imperial conversion
J	F	M	A	M	J	J	A	S	O	N	D
0.1 82 61	0.2 87 64	0.7 92 68	1.6 93 72	4.2 92 71	4.2 85 69	4.4 83 68	5.8 82 68	8.4 83 68	6.6 83 67	1.9 81 64	0.6 80 61
- █ Average max. and min. temperatures in °F
- █ Precipitation totals in inches

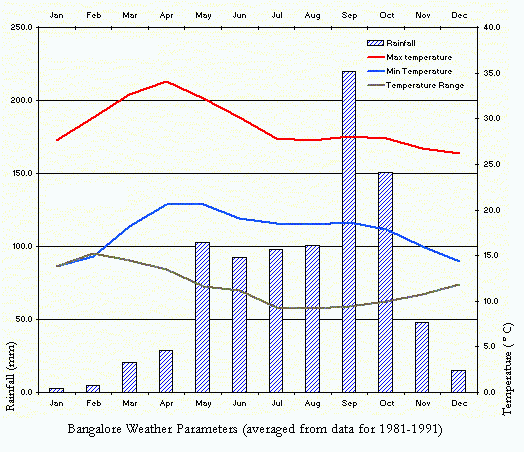
Rainfall and temperature

Due to its elevation, Bangalore enjoys a pleasant and equable climate throughout the year with occasional extreme weather events like heatwaves, coldwaves, floods and droughts. The highest temperature ever recorded in Bengaluru is 41.8°c in April 30, 2024 in Kengeri at Bengaluru. Winter temperatures rarely drop below 13 °C (52 °F) and summer temperatures seldom exceed 37 °C (97 °F)

The hottest summer day on average has a maximum temperature of about 37 °C, and the coldest winter day has a temperature of about 13 °C. Occasionally, heat waves can cause temperatures of up to 38-40 °C. Occasional coldwaves will be leading to the temperatures as low as below 9-10 °C . Bangalore receives about 970 mm of rain annually, with the wettest months being August, September and October. The heaviest rainfall recorded in a 24-hour period was 18 cm recorded on 1988.

Most of the rainfall occurs during late afternoon, evening or night and rain before noon is infrequent. November 2015 (290.4 mm) was recorded as one of the wettest months in Bangalore with heavy rains causing severe flooding in some areas, and closure of a number of organisations for over a couple of days.

Climate data for Bangalore (1981–2010, extremes 1901–2012)
Month	Jan	Feb	Mar	Apr	May	Jun	Jul	Aug	Sep	Oct	Nov	Dec	Year
Record high °C (°F)	32.8 (91.0)	35.9 (96.6)	37.9 (100.2)	41.8 (107.2)	41.1 (106.0)	38.1 (100.6)	33.3 (91.9)	33.3 (91.9)	33.3 (91.9)	32.4 (90.3)	31.7 (89.1)	31.1 (88.0)	41.8 (107.2)
Mean daily maximum °C (°F)	27.9 (82.2)	30.7 (87.3)	33.1 (91.6)	34.0 (93.2)	33.3 (91.9)	29.6 (85.3)	28.3 (82.9)	27.8 (82.0)	28.6 (83.5)	28.2 (82.8)	27.2 (81.0)	26.5 (79.7)	29.6 (85.3)
Mean daily minimum °C (°F)	15.8 (60.4)	17.5 (63.5)	20.0 (68.0)	22.0 (71.6)	21.7 (71.1)	20.4 (68.7)	19.9 (67.8)	19.8 (67.6)	19.8 (67.6)	19.6 (67.3)	18.0 (64.4)	16.2 (61.2)	19.2 (66.6)
Record low °C (°F)	7.8 (46.0)	9.4 (48.9)	11.1 (52.0)	14.4 (57.9)	16.7 (62.1)	16.7 (62.1)	16.1 (61.0)	14.4 (57.9)	15.0 (59.0)	13.2 (55.8)	9.6 (49.3)	8.9 (48.0)	7.8 (46.0)
Average rainfall mm (inches)	1.9 (0.07)	5.4 (0.21)	18.5 (0.73)	41.5 (1.63)	107.4 (4.23)	106.5 (4.19)	112.9 (4.44)	147.0 (5.79)	212.8 (8.38)	168.3 (6.63)	48.9 (1.93)	15.7 (0.62)	986.9 (38.85)
Average rainy days	0.2	0.4	1.1	3.1	6.7	6.2	7.2	9.9	9.8	8.3	3.8	1.4	58.1
Average relative humidity (%) (at 17:30 IST)	41	32	29	35	47	62	65	67	64	65	61	53	52
Mean monthly sunshine hours	262.3	247.6	271.4	257.0	241.1	136.8	111.8	114.3	143.6	173.1	190.2	211.7	2,360.9
Source 1: India Meteorological Department
Source 2: NOAA (sun: 1971–1990)

Climate data for Bangalore Airport (1981–2010, extremes 1949–2012)
Month	Jan	Feb	Mar	Apr	May	Jun	Jul	Aug	Sep	Oct	Nov	Dec	Year
Record high °C (°F)	32.2 (90.0)	35.0 (95.0)	36.6 (97.9)	38.5 (101.3)	39.2 (102.6)	37.5 (99.5)	33.0 (91.4)	32.2 (90.0)	33.0 (91.4)	32.5 (90.5)	31.7 (89.1)	30.3 (86.5)	38.3 (100.9)
Mean daily maximum °C (°F)	27.6 (81.7)	30.3 (86.5)	32.7 (90.9)	33.8 (92.8)	33.1 (91.6)	29.8 (85.6)	28.6 (83.5)	28.1 (82.6)	28.6 (83.5)	28.1 (82.6)	26.9 (80.4)	26.2 (79.2)	29.5 (85.1)
Mean daily minimum °C (°F)	14.8 (58.6)	16.2 (61.2)	18.7 (65.7)	21.0 (69.8)	21.2 (70.2)	20.1 (68.2)	19.6 (67.3)	19.5 (67.1)	19.5 (67.1)	19.2 (66.6)	17.5 (63.5)	15.4 (59.7)	18.6 (65.5)
Record low °C (°F)	8.8 (47.8)	10.0 (50.0)	11.7 (53.1)	14.6 (58.3)	16.7 (62.1)	16.1 (61.0)	16.1 (61.0)	15.0 (59.0)	15.6 (60.1)	13.7 (56.7)	10.5 (50.9)	9.2 (48.6)	8.8 (47.8)
Average rainfall mm (inches)	1.4 (0.06)	5.7 (0.22)	15.5 (0.61)	42.7 (1.68)	94.5 (3.72)	91.1 (3.59)	97.7 (3.85)	122.2 (4.81)	183.5 (7.22)	155.9 (6.14)	50.6 (1.99)	13.8 (0.54)	874.6 (34.43)
Average rainy days	0.1	0.3	1.0	2.7	5.5	5.1	7.0	8.9	9.2	8.3	4.1	1.2	53.5
Average relative humidity (%) (at 17:30 IST)	41	31	28	35	46	62	65	67	63	65	61	54	52
Source: India Meteorological Department

== Seismicity ==
Because it lies in the seismically stable region, Zone III (encompassing parts of Karnataka, Maharashtra, Kerala, Tamil Nadu and Andhra Pradesh), Bangalore has been untouched by major seismic events. Only mild tremors have been recorded frequently in the city. The largest earthquake that has ever hit the city was of magnitude 6.4 in April 1843.

== Land use ==
Component	PIU "ideal" Index	Average Score
Air Quality	395	180
Water Quality	130	121
Land	40	37
Terrestrial ecosystem	150	143
Aquatic ecosystem	15	12.5
Socio-economic (traffic, quality of life, etc.)	270	49.5
Total	1000	542
Table 1: Adapted from Table 17 of "Environment Impact Analysis" (2003) conducted by Bangalore Mass Rapid Transport Limited (BMRTL)

According to data contained in the Bangalore Mahanagara Palike Master Plan, 40.4% of the land in the city is used for residential purposes. Transport uses 24.3% of the land, while land used for industrial, and commercial purposes comprise 6.9% and 2.7% respectively. As the city of Bangalore expands, the BMP expects the percentage of land used for industrial purposes to decrease, while it expects the percentages of land used for residential, commercial and public and semi-public purposes to increase.

== General metropolitan environment ==
A random sampling study of the air quality index (AQI) of twenty stations within the city indicated scores that ranged from 76 to 314, suggesting heavy to severe air pollution around areas of traffic concentration. Major pollutants contributing to Bangalore's high AQI score include nitrogen oxide, Suspended Particulate Matter (SPM) and carbon monoxide.

The Bangalore metropolitan area, referred to as the Garden City of India has an abundance of fauna and flora. But now this is gone due to deforestation. The city has two nationally renowned botanical gardens—Cubbon Park and Lal Bagh. A majority of the trees in the city are big to medium canopy trees with girths above 40 cm. Coconut trees form a large minority of the tree population in the city.

In 2003, the Battelle Environmental Evaluation System (BEES) index used to evaluate environmental components was used to rate Bangalore's physical, biological and socioeconomic parameters. The results are summarized in Table 1.

== See also ==
- Geography of India
