= Bhogaraju =

Bhogaraju (Telugu: భోగరాజు) is a Telugu surname. Notable people with the surname include:

- Bhogaraju Narayana Murthy, Indian writer and playwright
- Bhogaraju Pattabhi Sitaramayya (1880–1959), Indian independence activist and politician
- Bhogaraju Ramana Rao, Indian physician
- Mohana Bhogaraju (born 1988), Indian playback singer
