= Sadashivanagar =

Coordinates: 13°0′33.57″N 77°34′50″E

- Neighbourhood
- Nickname: Palace Orchards
- Location in Bangalore, India
- Country: India
- State: Karnataka
- District: Bangalore Urban
- Named for: Karnad Sadashiva Rao

Government
  - Body: Greater Bengaluru Authority
- Time zone: UTC+5:30 (IST)
- PIN: 560080
- Vehicle registration: KA04

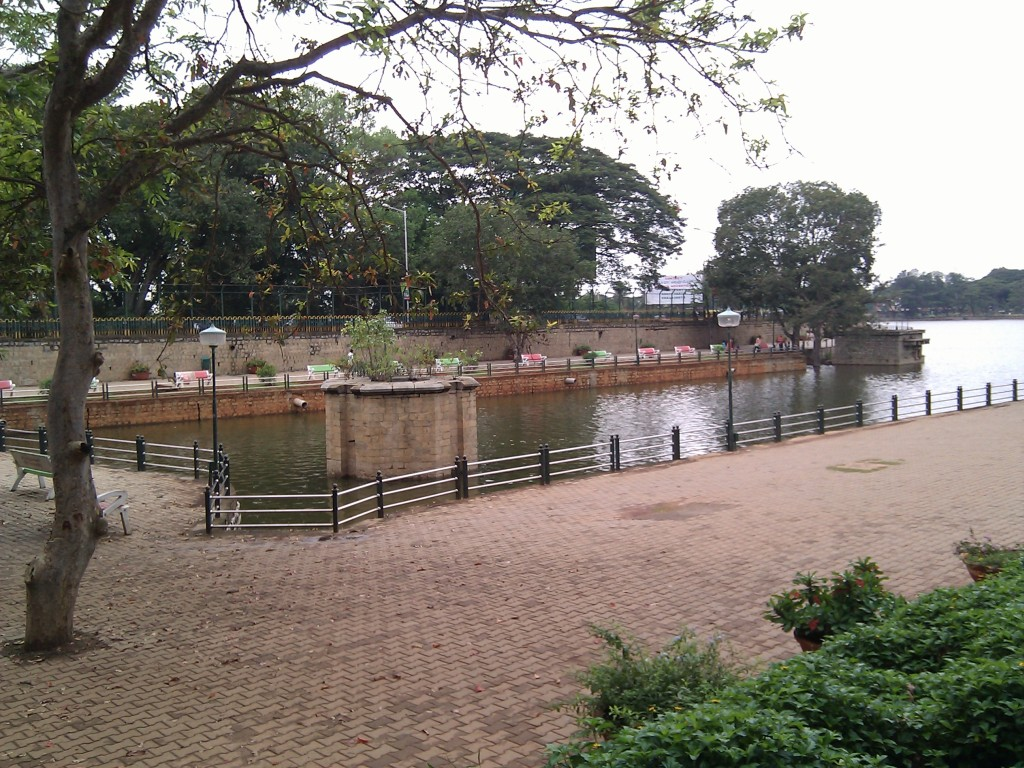

Sadashivanagar is an affluent residential neighbourhood in the north-western part of Bangalore in the Indian state of Karnataka. It is bounded by Malleshwaram to the west, Vyalikaval and Palace Guttahalli to the south, Palace Grounds to the east and Hebbal to the north.

The neighbourhood is home to several public personalities, like actors, businessmen and politicians. It is part of the Bangalore North Lok Sabha constituency and the Malleshwaram Assembly Constituency.

== History ==
Sadashivanagar was created out of the former royal gardens, and is home to one of the original four towers built in 1597 by Kempe Gowda I, the founder of Bengaluru.

In the 1960s and early 1970s, the gardens of the Bangalore Palace (a summer home of the Wodeyar dynasty of Mysore) were converted and developed into what is now Sadashivanagar, formerly known as "Palace Orchards." It was renamed in the 1990s in honor of Karnad Sadashiva Rao, a freedom fighter and philanthropist.

== Neighbourhood ==
Sadashivanagar is bounded by Mehkri Circle in the north, Bhashyam Circle in the south, Sankey Tank to the west, and Bellary Road and Palace Grounds to the east. There are a few small parks in Sadashivanagar.

== Notable residents ==
- Swaroop Kanchi - film actor, director and author
- D. K. Shivakumar - Chief Minister of Karnataka (Congress)
- K C Reddy - Karnataka's First Chief Minister
- Basappa Danappa Jatti - former President of India
- Ramakrishna Hegde - former Chief Minister of Karnataka and former Union Minister of Commerce and Industry
- Veerendra Patil - twice former Chief Minister of Karnataka
- M. Rajasekara Murthy - former union minister, Lingayat/Veerashiva political chief
- S. M. Krishna - former Chief Minister of Karnataka, former Governor of Maharashtra, former Union Minister of External Affairs
- Dharam Singh - former Chief Minister of Karnataka
- D. Devaraj Urs - former Chief Minister of Karnataka
- Bangarappa - former Chief Minister of Karnataka
- Kumar Bangarappa - MLA, former minister in the Government of Karnataka
- H. D. Deve Gowda - former Prime Minister of India, former Chief Minister of Karnataka
- M. Nageswara Rao - former Managing Director and Finance Director of Hindustan Machine Tools
- Mallikarjun Kharge - Union Minister of Labour and Employment
- Kengal Hanumanthaiah - Chief Minister of erstwhile Mysore State
- Raghavendra Rajkumar - Kannada actor and producer
- Bhogaraju Ramana Rao - physician, Padma Shri recipient
- Rajkumar - Kannada actor
- Puneeth Rajkumar - Kannada actor, singer and television presenter
- Upendra - Kannada actor and director
- V. G. Siddhartha - founder and chairman of Café Coffee Day
- V. L. Patil - former minister in the Government of Karnataka, former Member of Parliament
