= Yeswanthpur =

Yeshwanthapura Yeshwanthpur Yesvantpur
- neighborhood
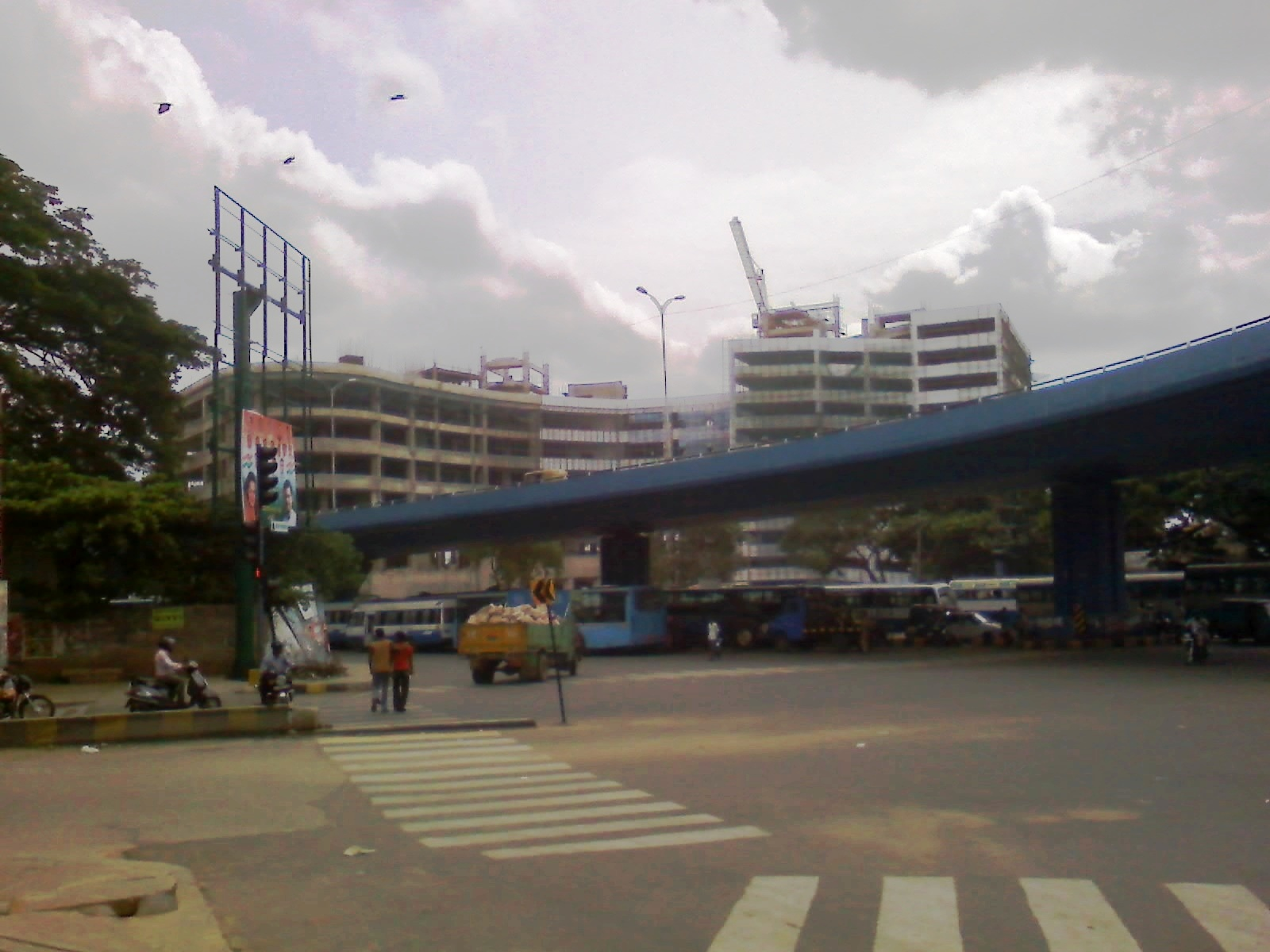
- Flyover at Yeshwanthpur Junction

- Location within Bengaluru
- Coordinates: 13.0285°N 77.54620°E
- Country: India
- State: Karnataka
- District: Bangalore Urban
- Metro: Bangalore

Languages
  - Official: Kannada
- Time zone: UTC+5:30 (IST)
- PIN: 560022
- Vehicle registration: KA 04

Yeshwanthpur (also spelled Yeshwanthapura, Yesvantpur, among others) is a locality in the northwestern part of Bangalore in the Indian state of Karnataka. It is located to the north of Malleswaram and west of Hebbal. The biggest wholesale market for agricultural produce in the city, the Yeshwanthpur APMC Yard, is situated in the locality. The green line of Namma Metro passes through Yeshwanthpur Metro Station and allows connectivity to all the extensions of the city.

== Etymology ==
Jayachamarajendra Wadiyar's association with Yeshwantrao Ghorpade led to common meetings, usually spent on hunting, and a cup of tea in the outskirts of his Bangalore Palace, which was a small village and had the proximity of Mysore sandal soap factory. The conversation went late into the night, which made it difficult to head back to the Palace. As a token of friendship to Yeshwantrao Ghorpade, Jayachamarajendra Wodeyar renamed the railway station in the area after Yeshwantrao Ghorpade. Since then, the area has been popularly known as Yeshwanthpur. The largely popular Yesvantpur Junction railway station was commissioned by Mysore Maharaja Chamarajendra Wadiyar X in 1881.

Yeshwanthpur comprises many lesser-known historic places, viz.

- Deewanarapalya – In Kannada, Deewan means Prime Minister (Mysore State), due to its proximity to the Bangalore palace. This place was the serving quarters for the Deewan of Mysore.
- Subedarpalya – In Kannada, Subedar means Head of a Regiment, due to its proximity to the Bangalore palace. This place was the serving quarters for the Subedar of Mysore.

Both these places, along with Vyalikaval (in Kannada, which means station of horses) and Malleshwara, were important political and strategic points to the Kingdom of Mysore.
