= Sri Gangamma Devi Temple =

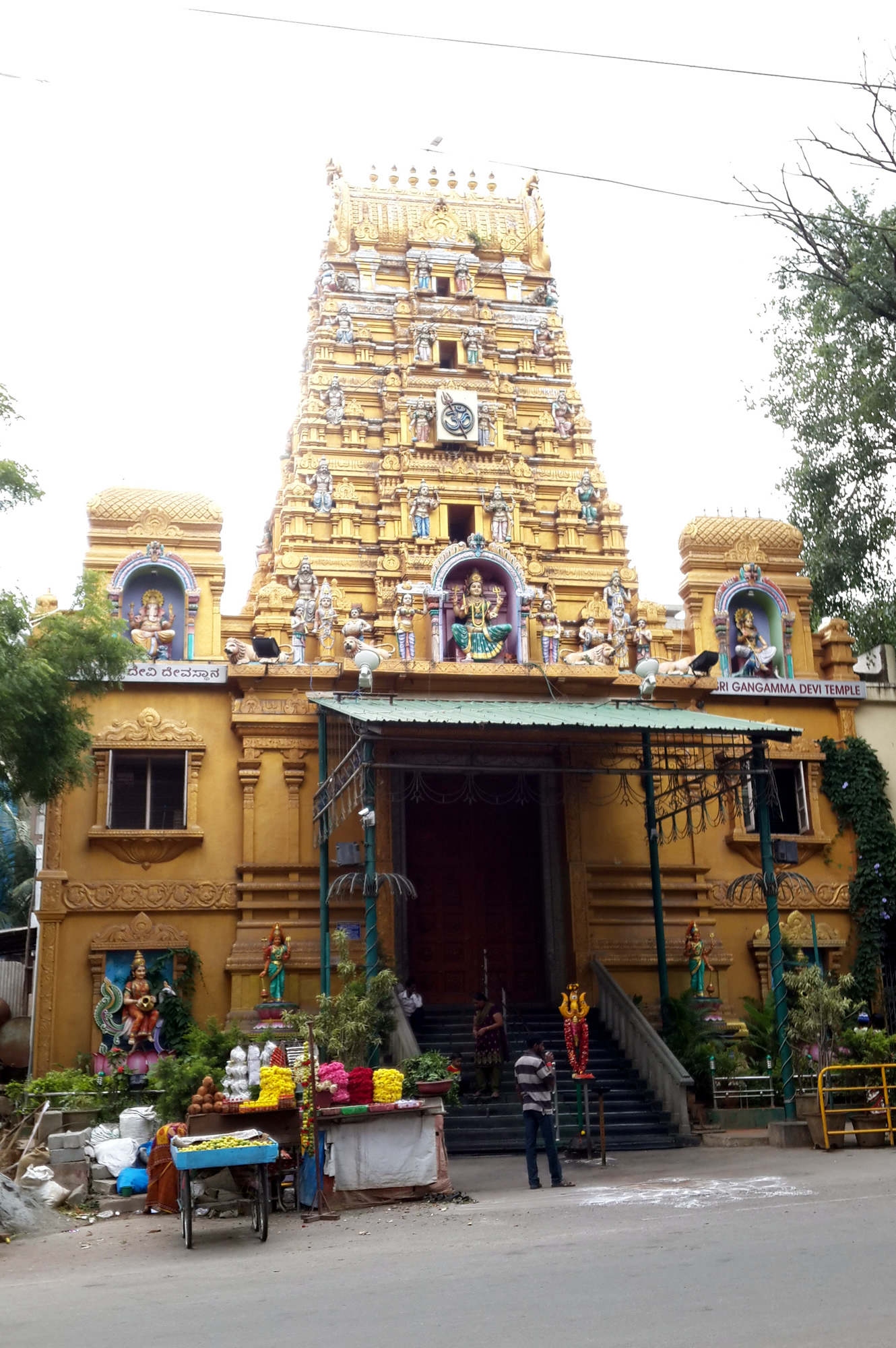
- Sri Gangamma Devi Temple, Malleshwara

Religion
- Affiliation: Hinduism
- District: Bangalore
- Deity: Gangamma

Location
- Location: Malleshwara
- State: Karnataka
- Country: India
- Interactive map of Sri Gangamma Devi Temple
- Coordinates: 13.0044484°N 77.5694959°E

Sri Gangamma Devi Temple is located near the Kadu Malleshwara temple on 2nd Temple Street, Malleshwara layout, in the north-western area of Bangalore city.

The main deity of the temple is Gangamma or the Goddess Ganga, who is also considered to have manifested on Earth as the River Ganga.

== Temple history ==
A popular Goddess in India, Gangamma is a Nada Devathe (Local deity) in Bangalore. The annual Gangamma jathre (Religious fair and festival) is held in various places across India and the event in Bangalore has been held in and around Malleshwara area since 1928.

A permanent temple was consecrated in honor of the Goddess in the year 2004.

== Other Shrines in the Temple ==
The temple complex also has smaller shrines for Ganesha, Subramanya and the Navagraha

== Annual Gangamma Jathre ==
A 'Jathra' or 'Jathre' is an annual religious fair and festival that is held in honor of various Saints and Local deities in the Southern states. (Such as the Yellamma Jathre in Yellamma Temple, Saundatti, the Nayakanahatti Jathre at the Nayakanahatti Thipperudra Swamy temple.

The Gangamma Jathre in Bangalore has been a tradition since 1928 and is currently held around the Malleshwara Gangamma temple.

The event is normally held over a three-day period and see thousands of devotees arriving from across Bangalore and nearby areas. The temple and the deity are specially decorated and devotees offer Ragi Ganji (gruel) to the Goddess, along with the traditional flowers, coconut and fruit.

== In popular culture ==
The Gangamma Devi temple has also been the subject of documentary in an episode of TV9's series Heegu Unte.

Year	Name of Documentary	Produced by	Viewable at
2010	TV9: "Heegu Unte": Episode - 24-10-2010 - Gangamma Devi Temple - Malleshwara	TV9 Television Channel	https://www.youtube.com/watch?v=o_mT60y6vd0
