= Vyalikaval =

- Location within Bengaluru
- Coordinates: 13.002°N 77.575°E
- Country: India
- State: Karnataka
- Metro: Bangalore

Languages
  - Official: Kannada
- Time zone: UTC+5:30 (IST)
- PIN: 560003

Vyalikaval is a neighbourhood in Bengaluru, India. It lies in the Malleshwaram Assembly Constituency and the Bangalore North Parliamentary constituency.

== History ==
The origin of the name "Vyalikaval" is not known. One theory suggests that it derives from a reference to the horse stables it once housed. Another suggests that "kaval" is likely referencing state-protected grazing grounds demarcated in old revenue records.

Vyalikaval was developed alongside the Kumara Park locality in the late 1940s, during a period of planned expansion in Bengaluru following India's independence in 1947. The City Improvement Trust Board (CITB), established in 1945, was responsible for this phase of the city's growth. The Bangalore Development Authority (BDA) succeeded the CITB in 1976.

== Location ==
It is bordered by Palace Orchards, Kodandarampura, Palace Guttahall, and Sadashivanagar localities, and is close to Sankey Tank lake.

The locality houses the city's oldest dhobi ghat, a community laundry facility; a Venkateshwara Temple operated by the Tirumala Tirupati Devasthanams (TTD); Chowdiah Memorial Hall, a cultural and concert venue; and a community sports ground used by local football teams and educational institutions.
