= Palace Guttahalli =

Human settlement in Karnataka, India

Coordinates: 12°59′44.27″N 77°34′29.46″E

Palace Guttahalli, also referred to simply as Guttahalli, is one of the oldest districts of Bengaluru, Karnataka, India.

== History ==
The area derives its name from the nearby Bengaluru Palace, which is 2 kilometres (1.2 mi) away. "Gutta" in Kannada means "small hill", and according to historian Arun Prasad, this suggests that rocks and forests were cleared to make way for the village, which housed palace staff.

== Other attractions ==
The area houses lot of popular printing presses, cyber centers and tailoring shops. Also situated there is Jamia Masjid which is the big mosque in the locality. It also has many temples such as Dattatreya temple, Raghavendra mutt, Uttarayana temple, and Muneshwara temple.

Vasavi Diagnosis is located in this area. National Tuberculosis Institute is situated on Bellary road, Guttahalli, next to Cauvery Theatre.

== Transport ==
Palace Guttahalli is well connected by the Bangalore Metropolitan Transportation Corporation buses (BMTC) with the downtown and other localities in Bangalore. BMTC buses like 176 series, 104 series commute regularly.

Vinayaka circle and Guttahalli circle are major junctions here. Nagappa Street and 2nd Main road are the two main roads running through the heart of Palace Guttahalli. The vehicular density and the resulting pollution on these roads are major causes of concern. In 2025, VS Raju Road was in a prolonged state of disrepair due to sewage pipeline and road works.

== Neighbouring areas ==
The area is surrounded by other popular areas such as Malleshwaram, Seshadripuram, Kumarapark, Vyalikaval, Lower Palace Orchards, Sadashivnagar. Popular Sankey Tank lake is situated very near to the area.
