= Richard Hieram Sankey =

British Army general

Lieutenant-General Sir Richard Hieram Sankey KCB
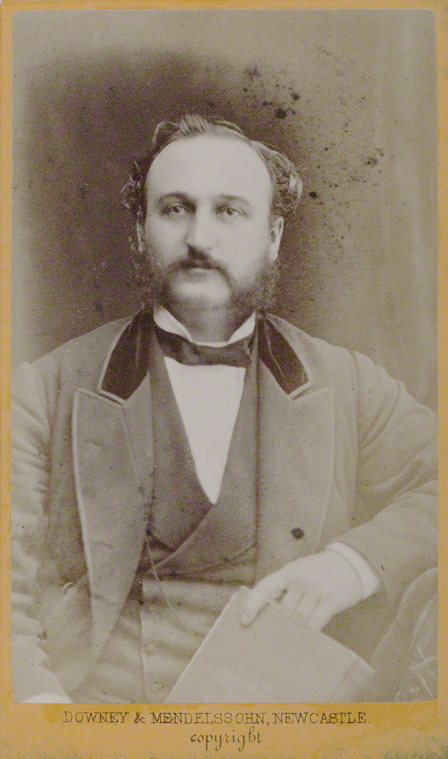
- Albumen carte de visite, National Portrait Gallery
- Born: 22 March 1829; Rockwell Castle, County Tipperary, Ireland
- Died: 11 November 1908 (aged 79); St George's Hospital, London
- Burial place: Hove, Sussex
- Military career
- Allegiance: United Kingdom
- Branch: East India Company Army; British Army
- Service years: 1846–1884
- Rank: Major-General (honorary lieutenant-General on retirement)
- Units: Madras Sappers; Royal Engineers
- Commands: Royal Engineer detachment, Kandahar Field Force
- Conflicts: Indian Rebellion of 1857; Second Anglo-Afghan War
- Awards: Knight Commander of the Order of the Bath; Companion of the Order of the Bath
- Other work: Chairman, Irish Board of Works

Lieutenant-General Sir Richard Hieram Sankey KCB (22 March 1829 – 11 November 1908) was an officer in the Royal (Madras) Engineers in the East India Company's army in British India, later transferring to the British Army after the Indian Rebellion of 1857 and the assumption of Crown rule in India. Sankey Tank which he constructed to meet the water demands of Bangalore is named after him. The high court building in Bangalore, Attara Kacheri, was designed by him and built by Arcot Narrainswamy Mudaliar.

== Early life ==
Richard Sankey was born in 1829 at Rockwell Castle, County Tipperary, Ireland on 22 March 1829. He was the fourth son of Eleanor and Matthew Sankey. Eleanor was herself from a family of military men, her father being Colonel Henry O'Hara, J.P of O'Hara Broom, County Antrim. Matthew Sankey was a barrister at Bawnmore, County Cork and Modeshil, County Tipperary. Richard Sankey did his schooling at Rev. Flynn's School on Harcourt Street in Dublin and entered the East India Company's military seminary at Addiscombe in 1845. At Addiscombe he was awarded for his excellence at painting.

== Career in India ==
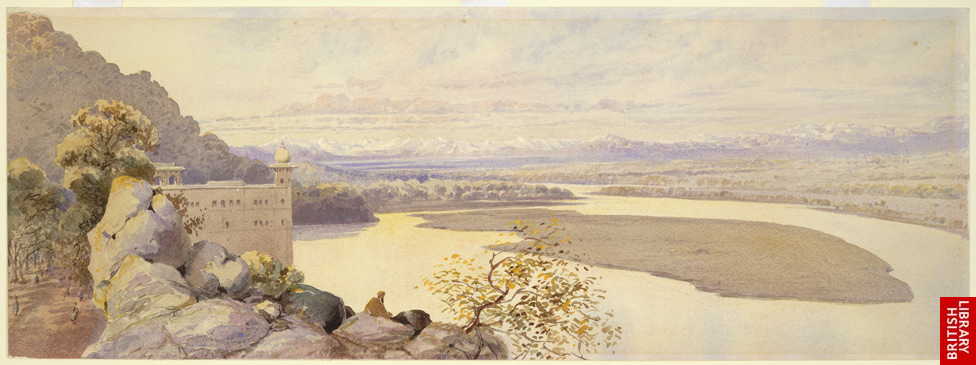
Water-colour painting showing the head of the Ganges Canal at Haridwar in Uttar Pradesh (Now Uttarakhand), by Sir Richard Hieram Sankey c.1876.

He was commissioned as a second lieutenant in the Madras Sappers in November 1846, he was then trained in military engineering with the Royal Engineers at Chatham from 1 January 1847 (holding temporary rank as an ensign in the British Army). He then arrived in India in November 1848. After two years of service at Mercatur, he officiated in 1850 as superintending engineer at Nagpur. During this time he made a small collection of fossils of Glossopteris from the Nagpur district and wrote a paper on the geology of the region in 1854. The collection was moved from the Museum of Practical Geology to the British Museum in 1880. In 1856, he was promoted as the superintendent of the East Coast Canal at Madras. In May 1857, he was promoted Under-Secretary of the Public Works Department under Col. William Erskine Baker in Calcutta. During the Indian Rebellion of 1857, he was commissioned as the captain of the Calcutta Cavalry Volunteers, but was soon despatched to Allahabad where he led the construction of several embankments and bridges across the Yamuna and Ganges. He was involved in the construction of shelters to advancing troops along the Grand Trunk Road to aid the quelling of the Indian Rebellion of 1857. He arrived in course of this work at Cawnpore (now Kanpur) a day before the attack by Tantya Tope (Second Battle of Cawnpore). He also was involved in crucial civil works that aided the quelling of the rebellion by bridging the Gogra and Gomti rivers at Gorakhpur and Phulpur that enabled the Gorkha regiment to cross these rivers. He received several commendations from his commanders here and later in the taking of the fort at Jumalpur, Khandua nalla and Kaisar Bagh, vital actions in the breaking of the Siege of Lucknow. For his actions at Jumalpur he was recommended for the Victoria Cross, although he did not receive this honour. He received the a medal for the Indian Rebellion of 1857 and was promoted to second captain on 27 August 1858, and given brevet promotion to major the following day for his services in the quelling of the rebellion. He was sent to the Nilgiris due to ill-health during this time.

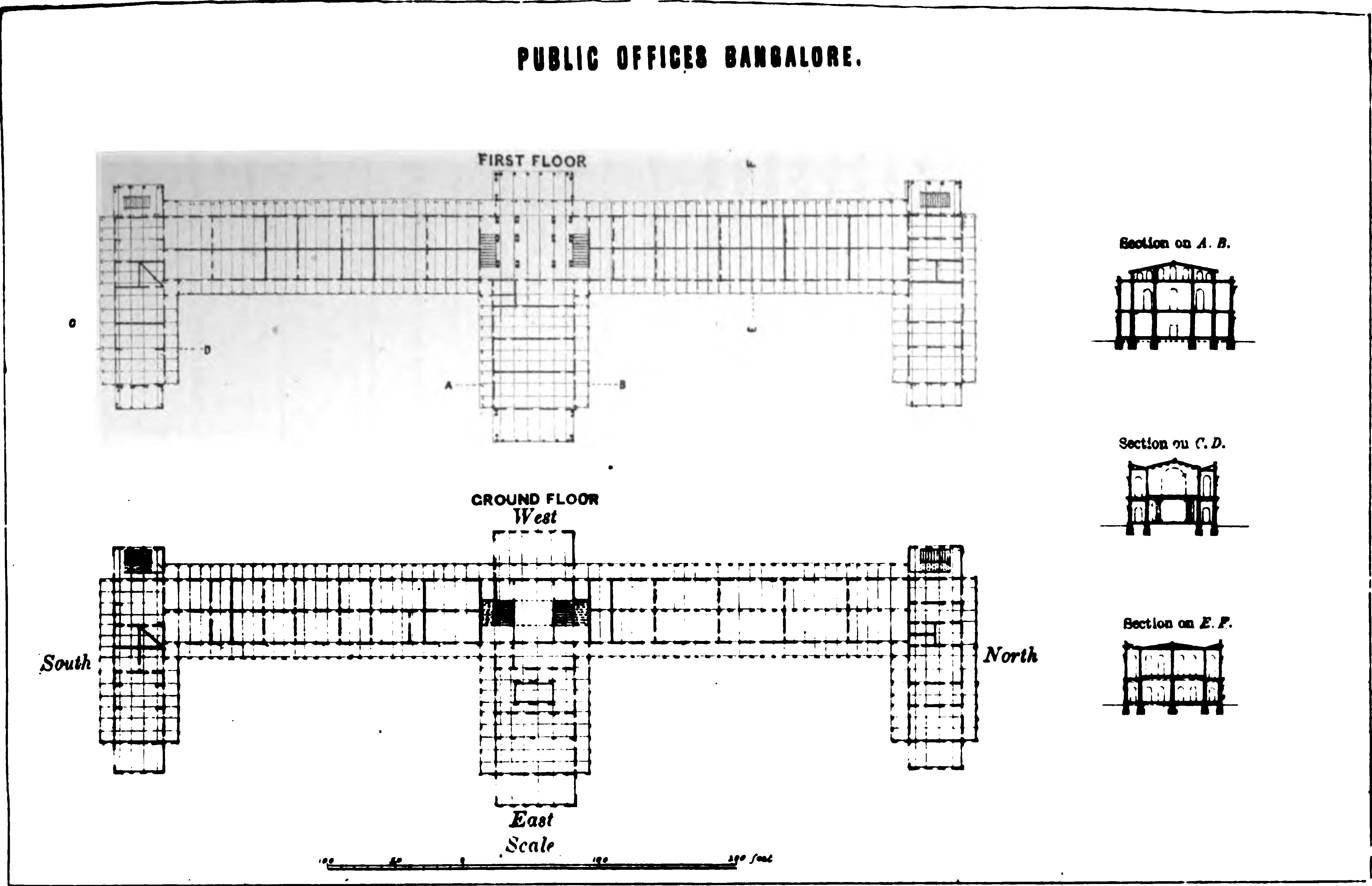
Plan of the government building in Bangalore, now housing the High Court and known as the Attara Kacheri

He spent a year in Burma as the executive engineer and superintendent of the jail at Moulmein. On 29 June 1861, he was promoted to substantive captain and was posted as the Garrison Engineer at Fort William, Calcutta and later as the assistant to chief engineer, Mysore until 1864, when he was made the chief engineer at Mysore. During this period he created a system within the irrigation department to deal with old Indian water catchment systems, surveying the catchment area and determining the area drained and the flows involved. Due to the reorganisation of the armed forces following the assumption of Crown rule in India he was transferred to the Royal Engineers on 29 April 1862. In Mysore, he was involved in public works and built several roads, buildings, tanks and canals.

In 1870, at the request of the Victorian Colonial Government, in view of his experience with hydrological studies in Mysore, he was invited to be chairman of the Board of Enquiry on Victorian Water Supply. During this visit, he also gave evidence to the Victorian Select Committee on Railways, as well as reports on the Yarra River Floods, and the Coliban Water Supply, and later contributed to the report on the North West Canal. While in Australia, he was also invited to the Colony of South Australia to report on the Water Supply of Adelaide.

He was brevetted lieutenant colonel on 14 June 1869, and substantive promotion followed on 15 October 1870 (without him ever having held the substantive rank of major), he was brevetted colonel on 15 October 1875.

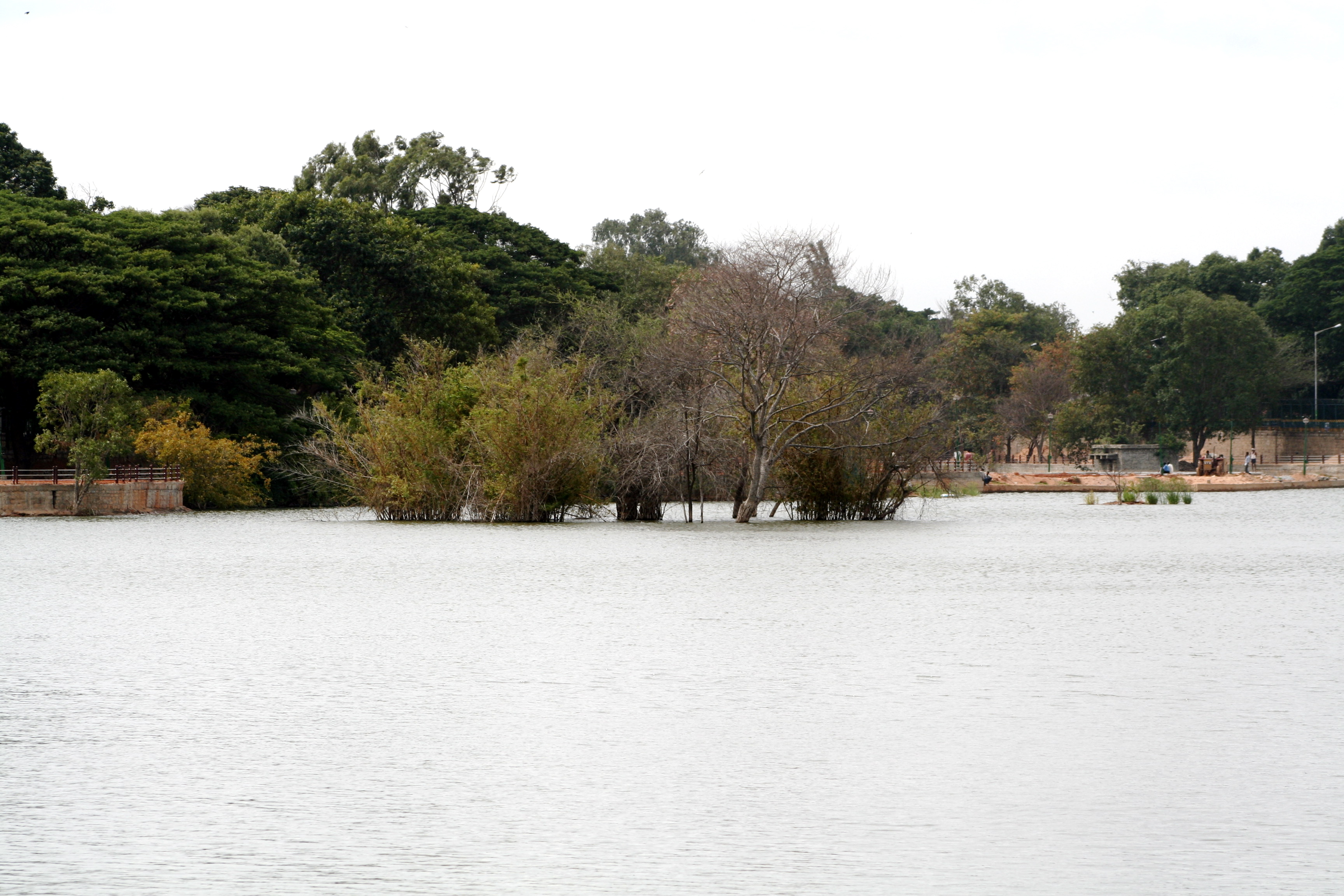
The Sankey Tank in Bangalore was constructed by Richard Sankey and bears his name.

He was appointed as an under-secretary to the Government of India in 1877. which earned him the Afghanistan Medal. In 1878, he was promoted as the secretary in the public works department at Madras, and was promoted substantive colonel on 30 December. He was appointed Companion of the Order of the Bath on 25 July 1879, and also commanded the Royal Engineers on the advance from Kandahar to Kabul during the Second Anglo-Afghan War. For about five years he was in Madras, where became a member of the legislative council in Madras and was elected as a Fellow of the Madras University. He also helped in the creation and improvements of the Marina, the gardens and the Government House grounds. He was promoted major general on 4 June 1883, and retired from the army on 11 January 1884 with the honorary rank of lieutenant general. He also received the distinguished service award in India.

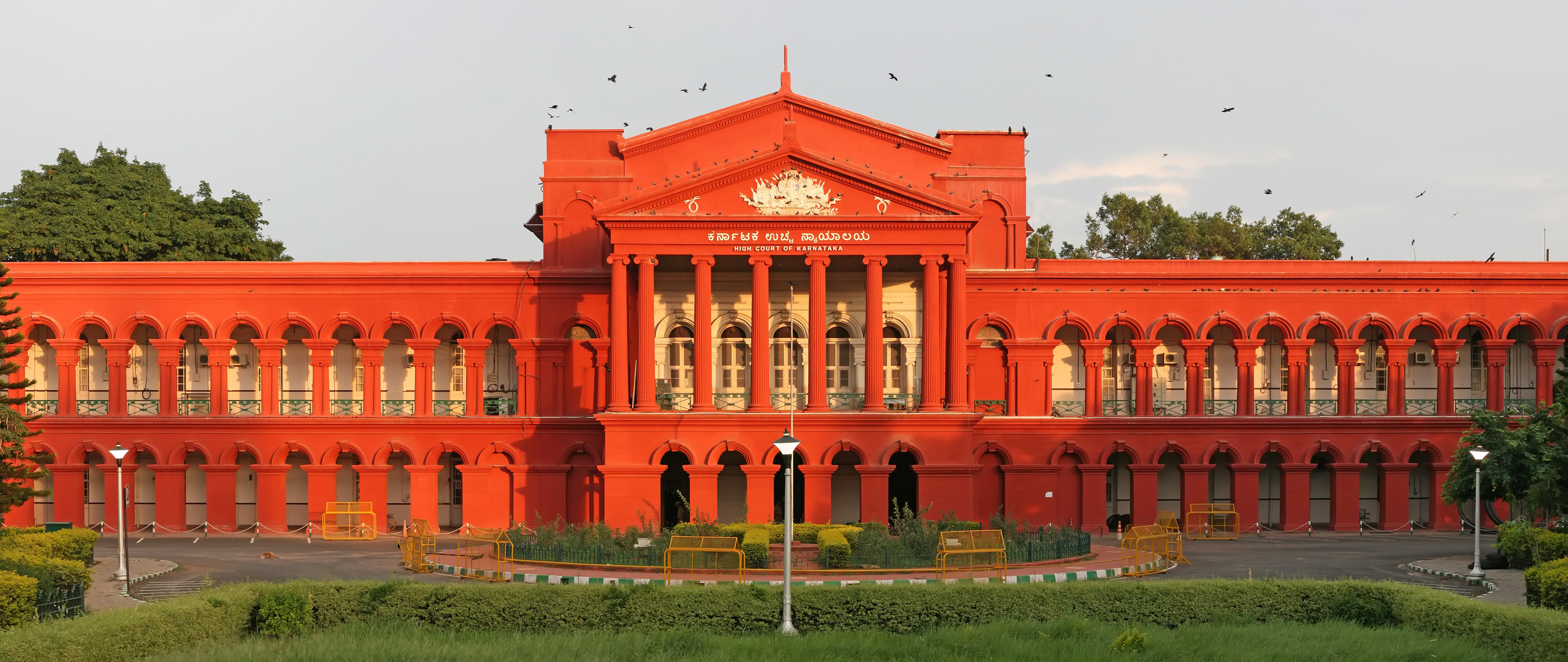
The High Court building

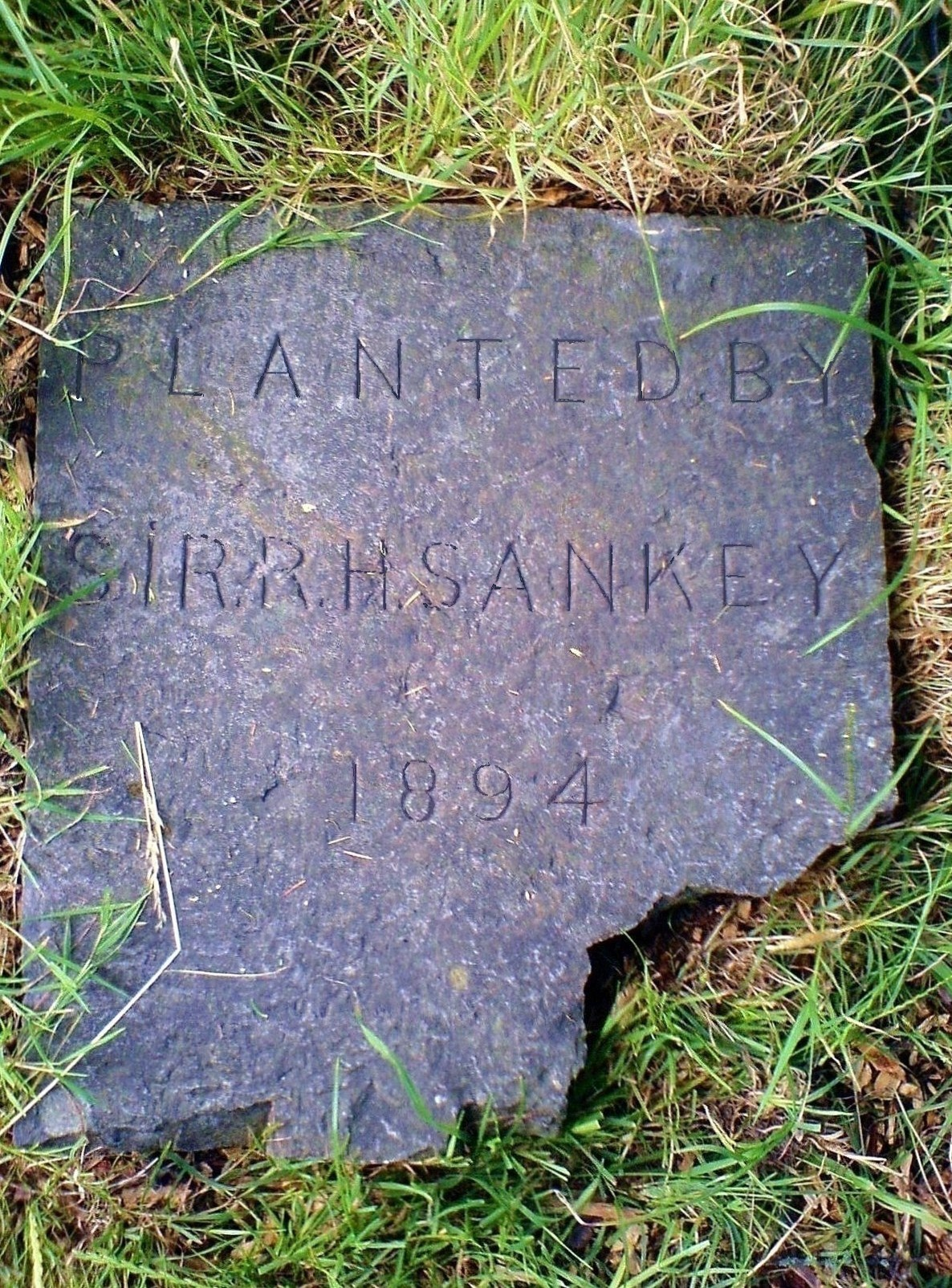
Plaque in Sankey's Wood, reads "Planted by Sir. R.H. Sankey 1894".

Sankey married Sophia Mary, daughter of William Henry Benson of the Indian Civil Service, at Ootacamund in 1858. After her death in 1882 he married Henrietta, widow of Edward Browne JP, at Dublin in 1890.

== Contributions to Bangalore ==
- St. Andrew's Church, Bangalore (1864)
- Cubbon Park (1864)
- Sankey Tank (1860)
- Bangalore Museum (1877)
- Mayo Hall (designed in 1870)

== Return to Ireland and death ==
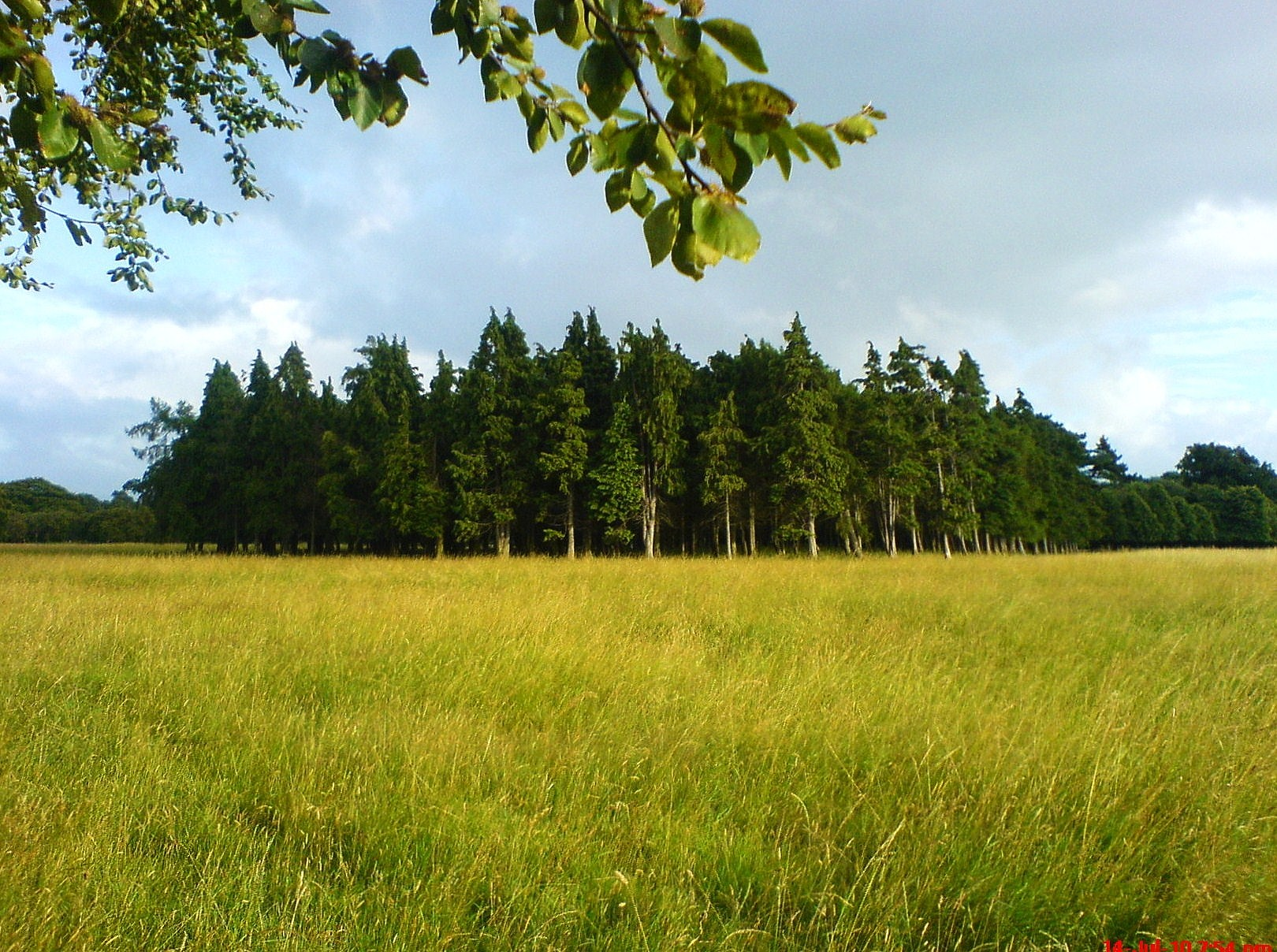
Sankey's Wood, Phoenix Park, Dublin.

After retirement, he went back to Ireland, where he became the chairman of the Board of Works. He was promoted Knight Commander of the Order of the Bath on 25 May 1892 for his work in Ireland. He also undertook projects in Mexico. Later he settled in London where he died at St George's Hospital in 1908 and was interred at Hove, Sussex.

Sankey is memorialised in Phoenix Park, Dublin, Ireland. A circle of trees bears the name Sankey's Wood. A plaque (dated 1894) lies half-hidden in the undergrowth there.
