= Doddabettahalli =

- village
- Interactive map of Doddabettahalli
- Coordinates: 12°29′N 77°29′E
- Country: India
- State: Karnataka
- District: bangalore
- Elevation: 962 m (3,156 ft)

Languages
  - Official: Kannada
- Time zone: UTC+5:30 (IST)
- PIN: 560097
- Lok Sabha constituency: Chikkballapur

Doddabettahalli is a village located in the Bangalore North Taluk, Karnataka, India. It is the highest natural point in Bangalore. The gentle slopes and valleys on either side of this ridge hold better prospects of ground water utilization. The low-lying areas are marked by a series of tanks varying in size from a small pond to those of considerable extent, but all very shallow.

== See also ==
- Bangalore Urban District
- Districts of Karnataka
