= Malleshwaram =

Neighborhood in Bangalore, India

- Neighbourhood
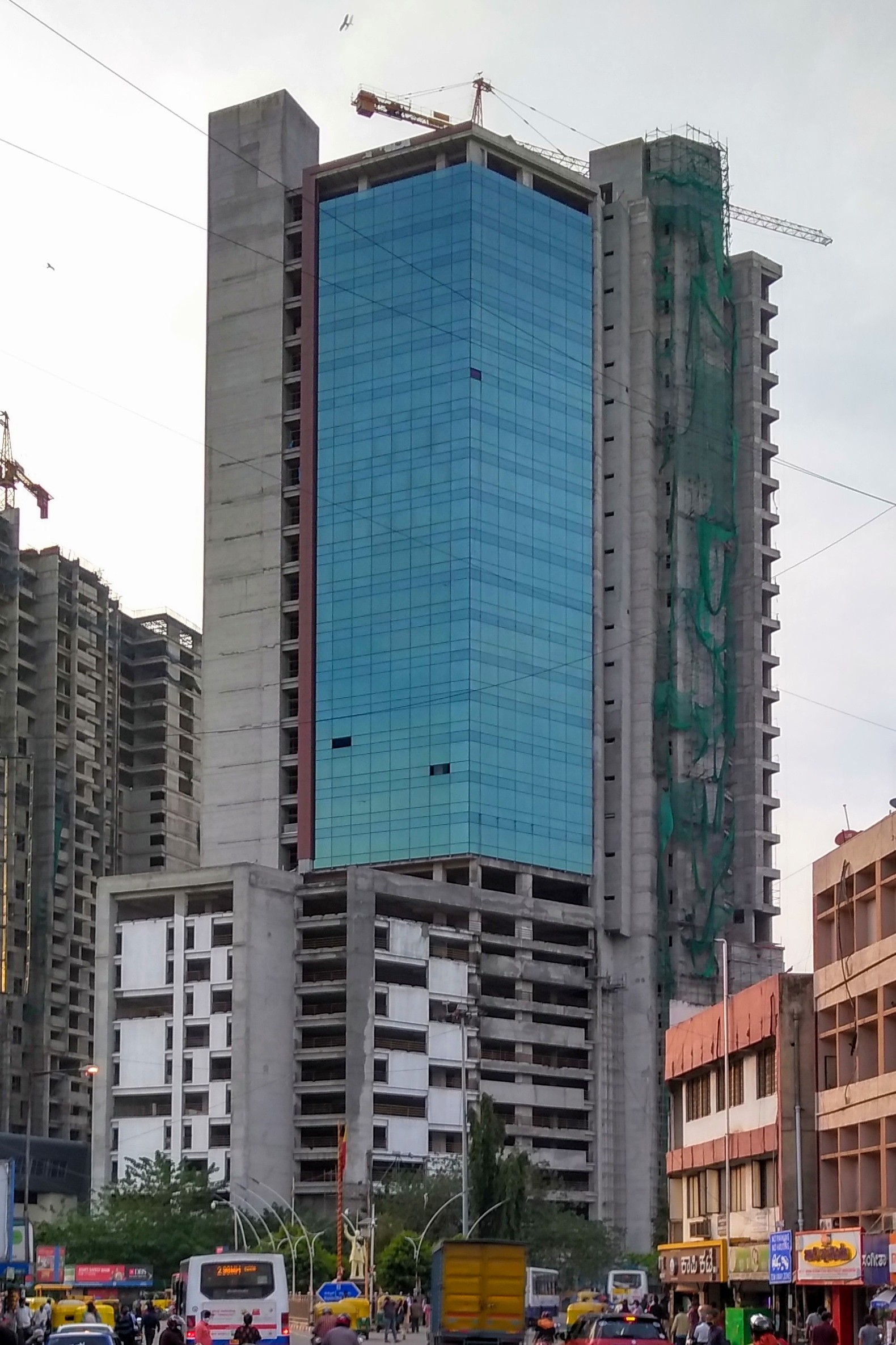
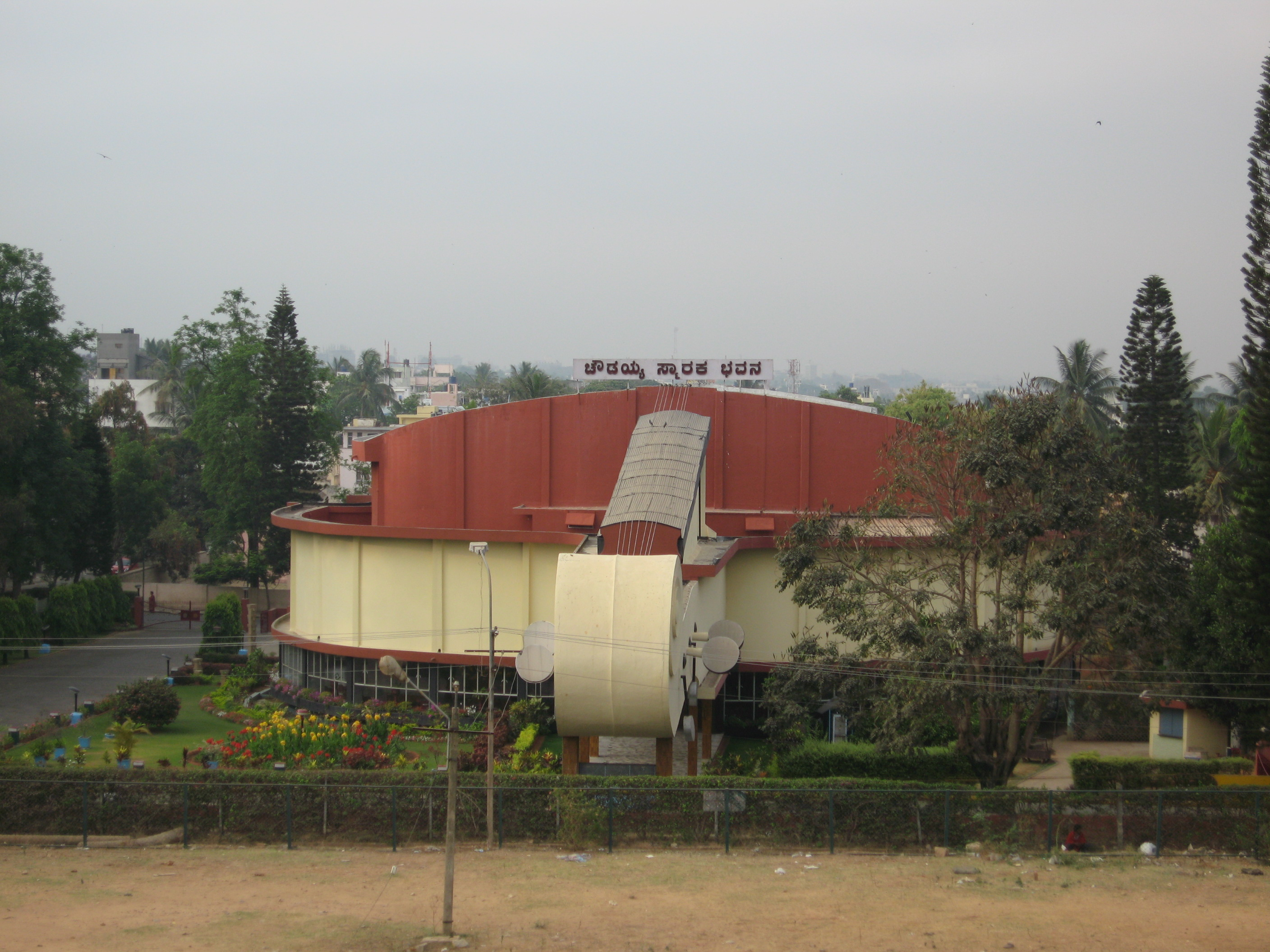
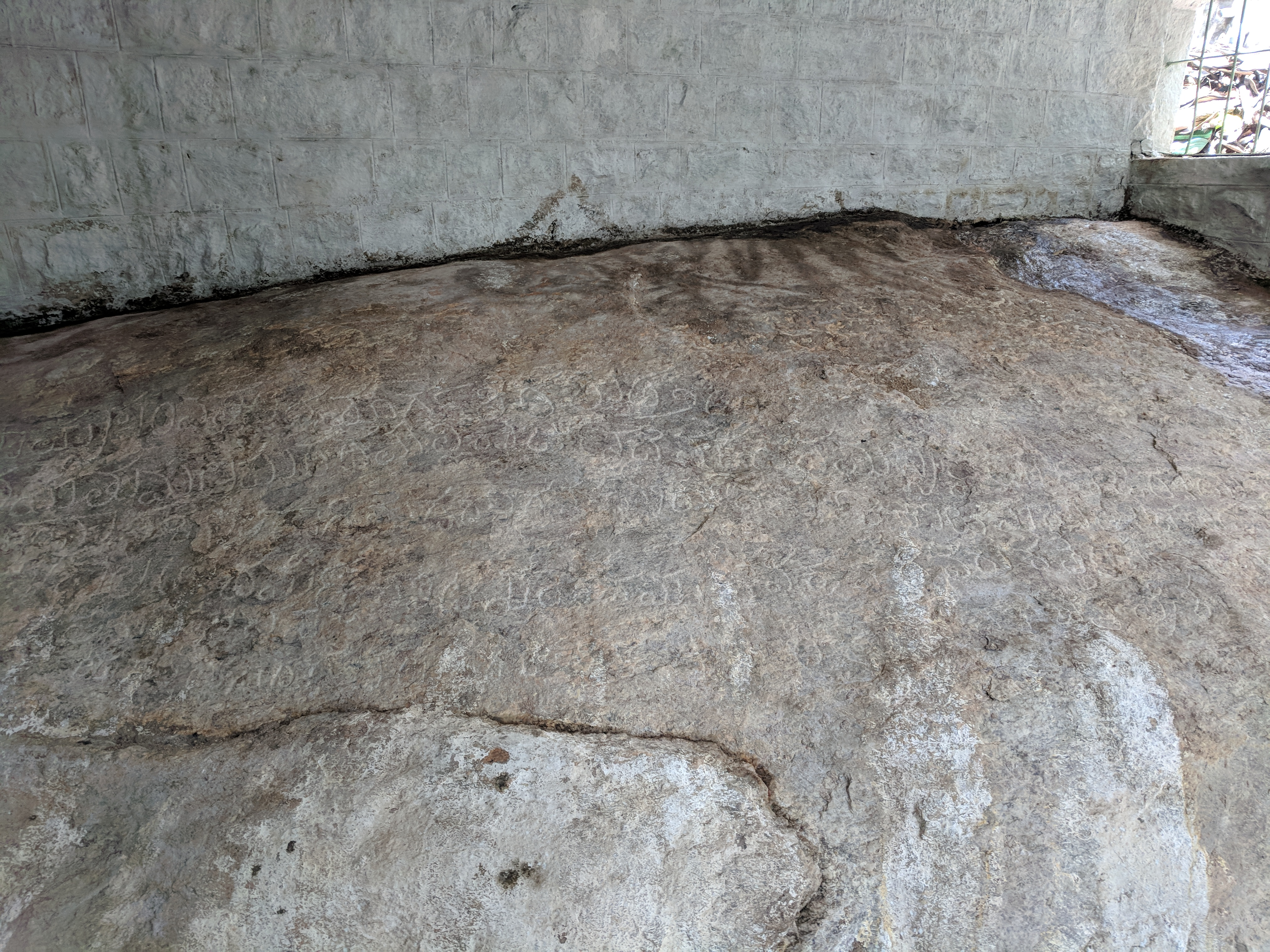
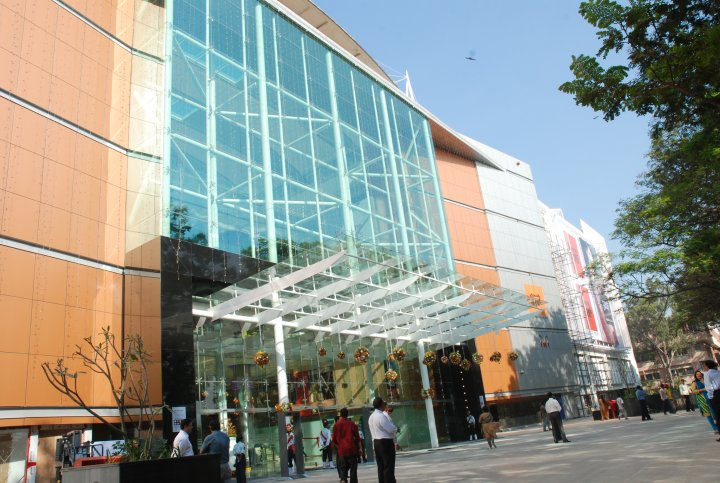
- Mantri Central, Chowdiah Memorial Hall, Malleshwaram inscriptions, Mantri Square

- Location within Bengaluru
- Coordinates: 13.0031°N 77.5643°E
- Country: India
- State: Karnataka
- Metro: Sampige Road
- District: Bengaluru Urban district

Area
  - Neighbourhood: 3.95 km^{2} (1.53 sq mi)
  - Metro: 28.6 km^{2} (11.0 sq mi)

Population (2020)
  - Neighbourhood: 99,625
  - Density: 25,196/km^{2} (65,260/sq mi)
  - Metro: 487,284
  - Metro density: 17,000/km^{2} (44,100/sq mi)

Languages
  - Official: Kannada
- Time zone: UTC+5:30 (IST)
- PIN: 560003, 560012, 560055
- Vehicle registration: KA-04

Malleshwaram is a locality in northwest Bangalore in Karnataka, India. One of Bangalore's oldest neighborhoods, it was founded in 1889 as a planned layout by the Wadiyar dynasty of the Kingdom of Mysore. Described as the "cultural heart" of Bangalore, Malleshwaram is bordered by the neighborhoods of Rajajinagar, Yeswanthpur, Seshadripuram and Palace Guttahalli. The name of the neighborhood is derived from the nearby Kadu Malleshwara Temple, which dates back to the 17th century.

The neighborhood hosts several offices, including the Bengaluru World Trade Center, and two of the largest shopping malls in the city, Mantri Square and Orion Mall. Multiple colleges and universities are based in Malleshwaram, such as the Indian Institute of Science (IISc), the Mysore Education Society, Government First Grade College, and the Institute of Wood Science and Technology.

== History ==
=== Early history ===
The area of modern-day Malleshwaram was conquered by Shahaji Bhonsle, a general of the Bijapur Sultanate, in the first half of the 17th century. According to a series of inscriptions dated from 1669, Shahaji's son Ekoji I donated the village of Medaraninganahalli (in the vicinity of the modern-day Indian Institute of Science) to the nearby Kadu Malleshwara Temple. The inscriptions refer to the name of the locality as Mallapura.

A separate undated inscription, recorded in Kannada and recovered near Sampige Road, is documented in Epigraphia carnatica. The inscription is incomplete, although the surviving text suggests it may record a separate donation or grant.

=== Later history ===
The name Mallapura is absent from British historical records of the surrounding areas of Bangalore; in 1878, the Survey of India recorded the location as part of a village named Ranganathapalya. In 1889, Chamaraja Wodeyar X, the Maharaja of Mysore, formed a committee led by his dewan K. Seshadri Iyer to create additional neighborhoods in Bangalore to ease congestion in the main city. Iyer's committee planned and laid out two extensions to the city, naming them Malleshwaram and Basavanagudi. Malleshwaram's initial layout encompassed a total of 291 acres. In 1895, the committee was dissolved and the neighborhood was integrated into Bangalore by the municipal authorities of the city.

Initially, the locality grew slowly. However, during the plague outbreak of 1896, which started in Bombay and spread to the city of Bangalore, the health authorities sequestered plague victims in camps within Malleshwaram and set up a large number of medical tents for treating patients. After the end of the epidemic, many of the recovered patients settled in the neighborhood and became permanent residents.

== Notable residents ==
- C.V. Raman, Nobel laureate in physics
- H. V. Nanjundaiah, founder of the University of Mysore
- Prakash Padukone, former professional badminton player
- Deepika Padukone, Bollywood actress
- Doreswamy Iyengar, classical Carnatic musician
- B. Saroja Devi, former Indian film actress

== Location ==
Malleshwaram is located in the northwestern part of the city of Bangalore, and is in close proximity to Yeswanthpur, Gokula, Rajajinagar, Sadashivanagar, Seshadripuram and the Kempegowda Bus Station. Multiple Namma Metro stations provide access to the neighborhood, including Sampige Road, Sandal Soap Factory, and Srirampura.

== Tourist attractions ==
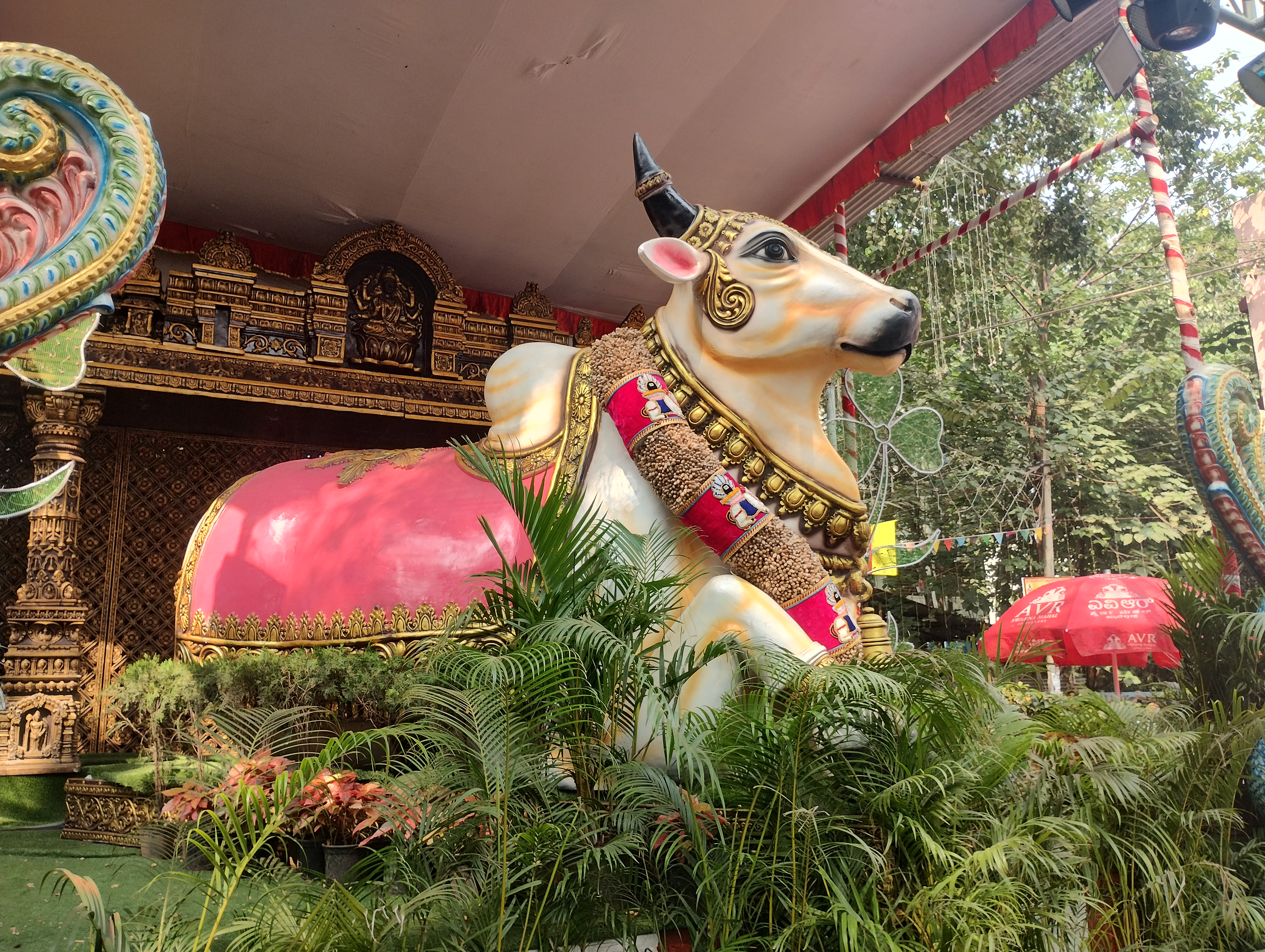
Sculpture of Nandi at 2025 Kadalekai Parishe

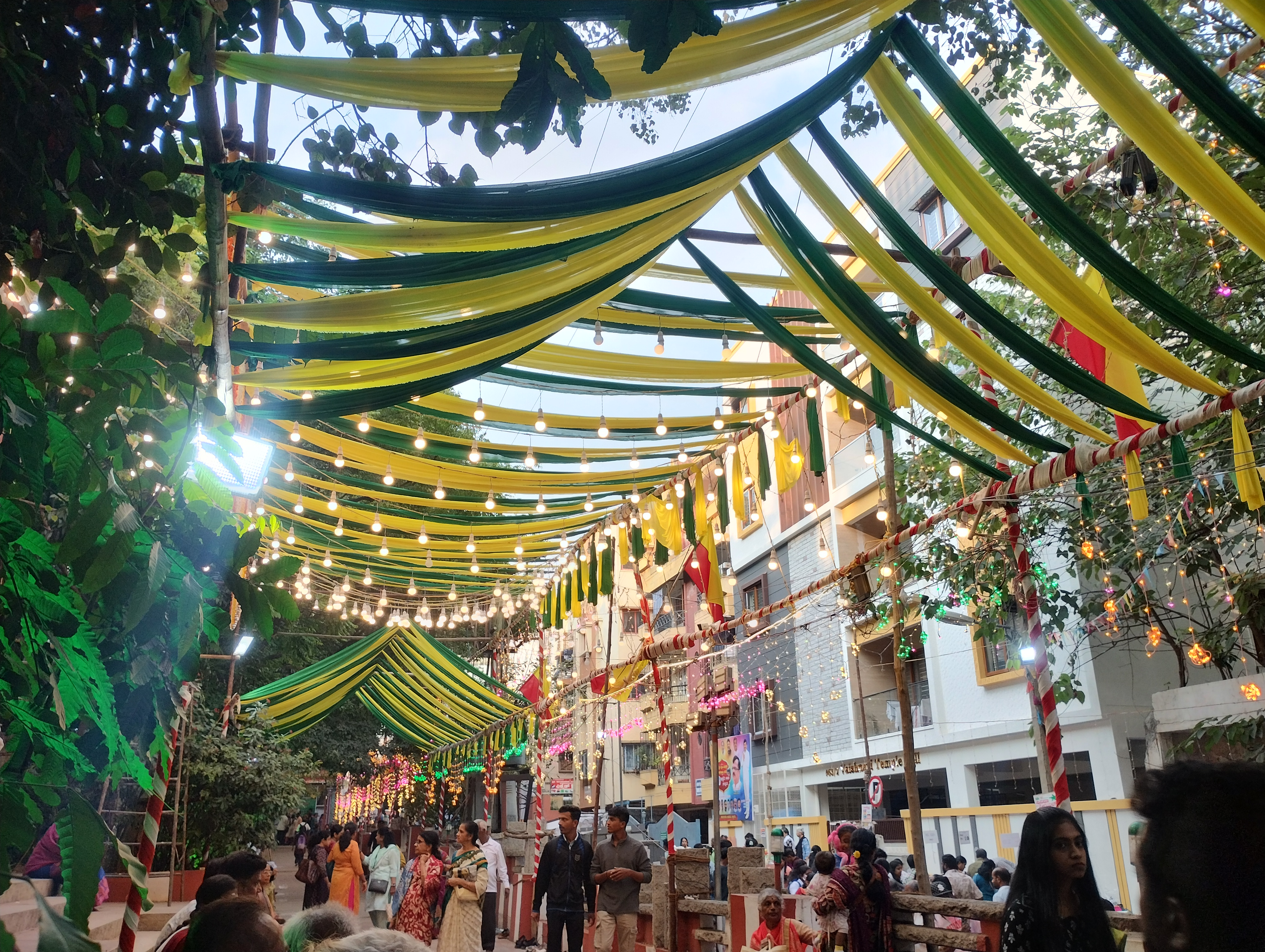
9th Malleshwaram Kadalekai Parishe (2025)

A number of tourist attractions are located in Malleshwaram, including the Kadu Malleshwara Temple, Orion Mall, Mantri Square Mall, and Sankey tank. The Bangalore ISKCON Temple is also located close to the neighborhood, in the bordering locality of Rajajinagara.

The annual Kadalekai Parishe, a groundnut fair where numerous varieties of peanuts and other food items are sold in public by local vendors, takes place in Malleshwaram during mid-November.

== Notable locations ==
- World Trade Center Bengaluru, the tallest commercial building in Bangalore.
- Kadu Malleshwara Temple
- Sri Gangamma Devi Temple
- Sri Dakshinamukha Nandi Tirtha Kalyani Kshetra
- Sri Lakshmi Narasimha Temple
- Sankey tank
- Mantri Square
- Orion Mall
- Institute of Wood Science and Technology
- Indian Institute of Science
