= Chowdiah Memorial Hall =

Cultural centre in Bangalore, India

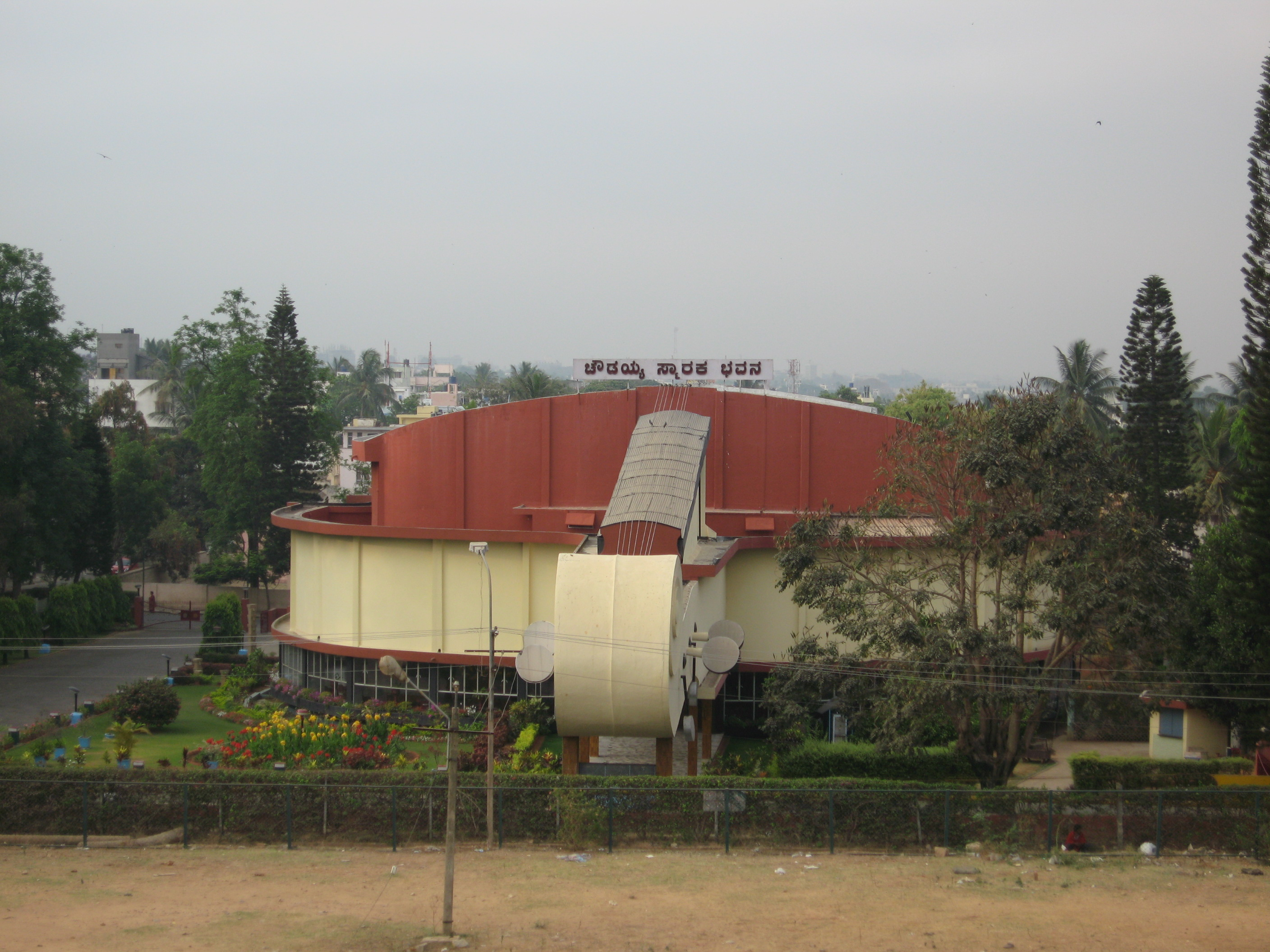
- The Chowdiah Memorial Hall
- Address: Gayathri Devi Park Extension, 16th Cross, Malleswaram; Bangalore; India
- Operator: Academy of Music
- Capacity: 1100

Construction
- Years active: 1980 onwards
- Architect: S.N. Murthy

Website
- cmh.co.in

Chowdiah Memorial Hall is a cultural centre in Bangalore which provides a home for musical and theatrical performances as well as competitions. Located in Malleswaram, it was built as a tribute to Tirumakudalu Chowdiah. It is administered by Academy of Music, an independent registered body, founded in 1961.

== History ==
K.K. Murthy, former chairman of the BDA, came up with the idea to construct a hall in memory of the violin maestro Chowdaiah. He chose a low-lying area, Gayatri Park Extension, as the location so that entire hall would be visible from an elevated point. The city corporation leased the land to the academy for a period of 99-years. Funds for the project were raised from State Government, banks like Syndicate Bank, and donations from public. The building, designed by S.N. Murthy, was completed on 14 November 1980 after seven years in construction with a cost of ₹36 lakh (US$38,000).

== Architecture ==
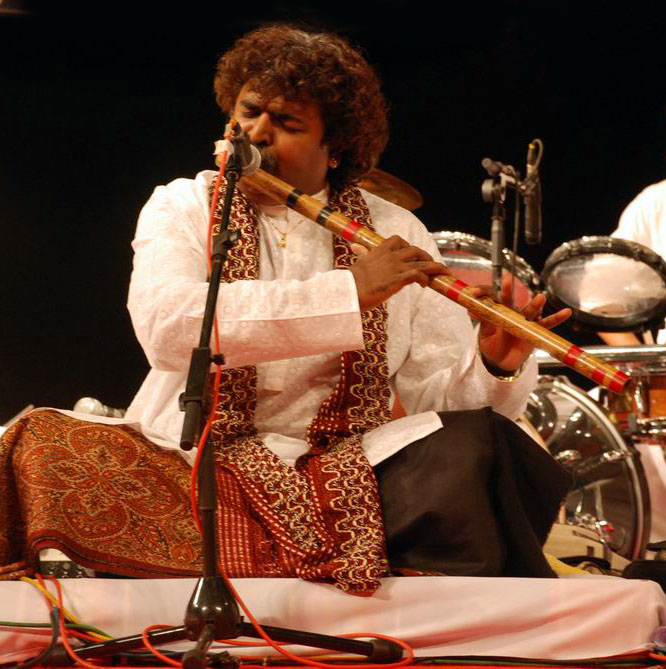
Pravin Godkhindi performing at Chowdiah

The auditorium is built in the shape of a gigantic seven stringed violin, complete with the strings, keys, the bridge and the bow. It has marble foyer lit with chandeliers. This is probably the only auditorium in the world that is dedicated to the memory of a musician and shaped like a violin.

== Events ==
The auditorium hosts a wide range of events from Carnatic and Hindustani concerts, jazz, ballets, traditional and contemporary dance performances, fashion shows, plays, jugalbandis, ghazals, international music festivals, graduation ceremonies, and school day programmes.
