= B. Ramana Rao =

Indian physician

Bhogaraju Ramana Rao is an Indian physician and cardiologist based in Bangalore, India. He was awarded the Padma Shri in 2010 for his contributions to the field of medicine. He has provided healthcare to rural people free of cost for over 30 years, and has aided in promoting access to drinking water and toilets in 16 villages. Rao was Kannada actor Dr. Rajkumar’s consulting physician.

Born in Hyderabad, his parents were originally from West Godavari district of Andhra Pradesh.
