= Sankey tank =

Reservoir in Bangalore, India

Sankey Tank
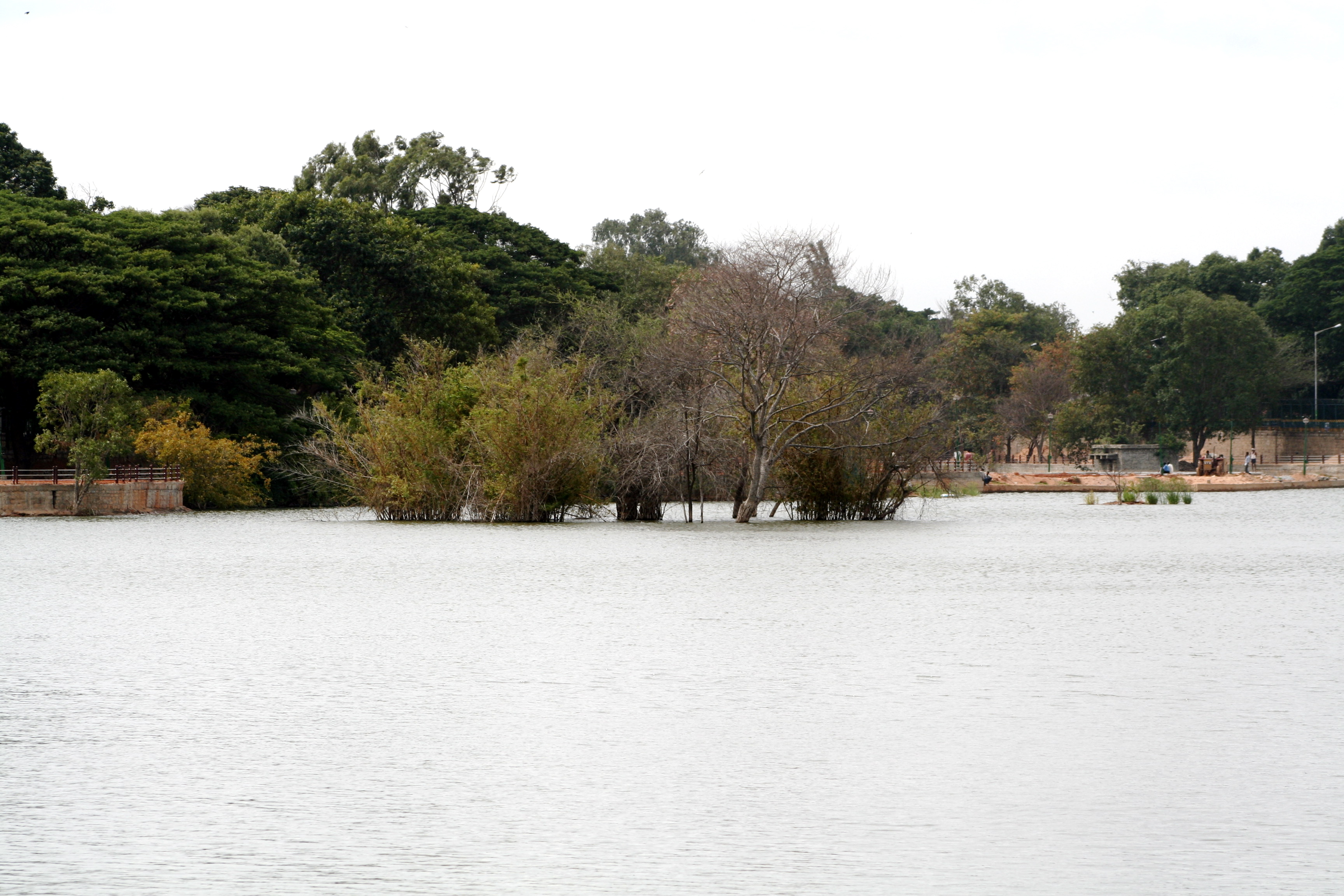
- Interactive map of Sankey Tank
- Location: Bangalore District, Karnataka
- Coordinates: 13.01°N 77.57°E
- Lake type: Freshwater
- Primary inflows: Rainfall
- Catchment area: 1.254 km (0.8 mi)
- Basin countries: India
- Surface area: 15 ha (37.1 acres)
- Max. depth: 9.26 m (30.4 ft)
- Shore length^{1}: 1.7 km (1.1 mi)
- Surface elevation: 929.8 m (3,050.5 ft)
- Islands: 1
- Settlements: Bengaluru
- ^{1} Shore length is not a well-defined measure.

Sankey Tank and vicinity

Sankey tank is an artificial lake or tank situated in the western part of Bangalore in the middle of the neighbourhoods of Malleshwaram, Vyalikaval and Sadashivanagar. The lake covers an area of about 15 ha (37.1 acres). At its widest, the tank has a width of 800 m (2,624.7 ft).

Sankey tank was constructed by Col. Richard Hieram Sankey (RE) of the Madras Sappers Regiment, in 1882, to meet the water supply demands of Bangalore. The tank was also known as Gandhadhakotikere, as the Government Sandalwood Depot used to be located near the lake.

== History ==
Sankey reservoir was constructed in 1882. It was linked to the Miller's tank and Dharmambudhi tank and was built as a safeguard against water shortages, as experienced in the Great Famine of 1876–78. The quality of water was not very good and when the Governor of Madras visited Bangalore in July 1888, a local wit commented, "The men who are thrown off their horses and killed on the spot at Bangalore are the only ones that are allowed by doctors not to have died from drinking bad water".

== Threats ==
The threats posed to the survival of the lake, which were also identified by the local people using the lake, scientific experts and bureaucrats, include:

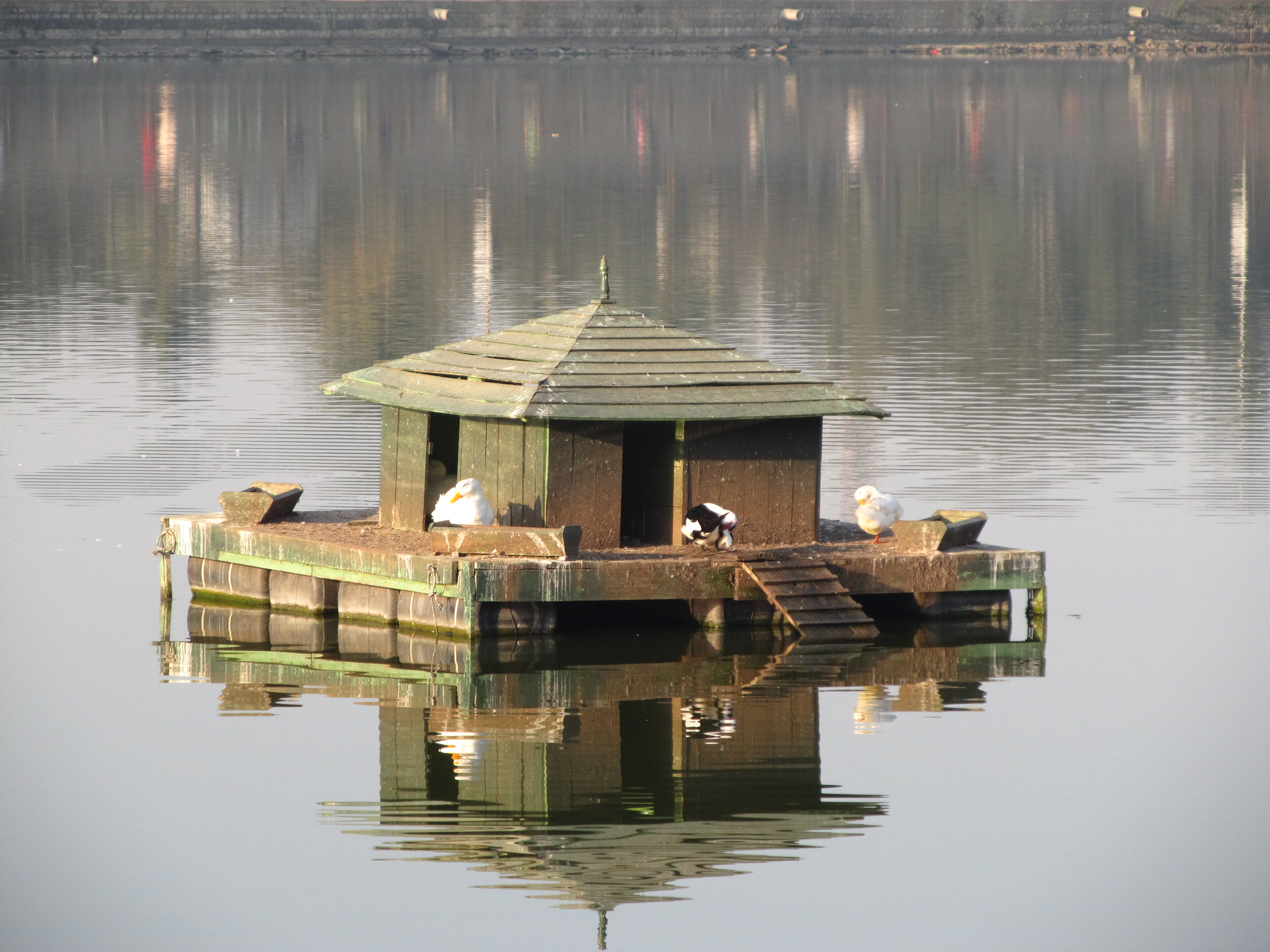
Ducks coming out of their nest.

- Contamination of water with sewage flowing in from seven points, which are connected to storm water drains
- Choked drains with garbage and sewage
- Leaking sewage pipes connected to a public toilet at a park

These threats have resulted in:

- Increased biological oxygen demand due to sewage dumping/leakage
- Variance in physio-chemical parameters. During the tests conducted in 2001 also the DO was reported to vary from 3.7 to 8.1, BOD between 2 and 8 and the pH varied from 7.1 to 7.5.
- A reduction in fauna diversity (mainly fish and aquatic birds) due to pollution, sewage leaks and littering

== Restoration actions ==
Sankey tank was developed into a park in early 2000s.

The tank was converted into a park by the Bengaluru Water Supply and Sewage Board (BWSSB) and the Bruhat Bengaluru Mahanagara Palike (BBMP) with funds provided by the Government of Karnataka. In addition, the following were also implemented.

- Removing encroachments
- Alum purification treatment to absorb toxic elements and germs
- Nursery towards the north
- Paved walkways
- Landscaped parks
- Special tank for idol immersion during Ganesh Chaturthi festival
- Restoration of swimming pool

== Legal land encroachment tangle ==
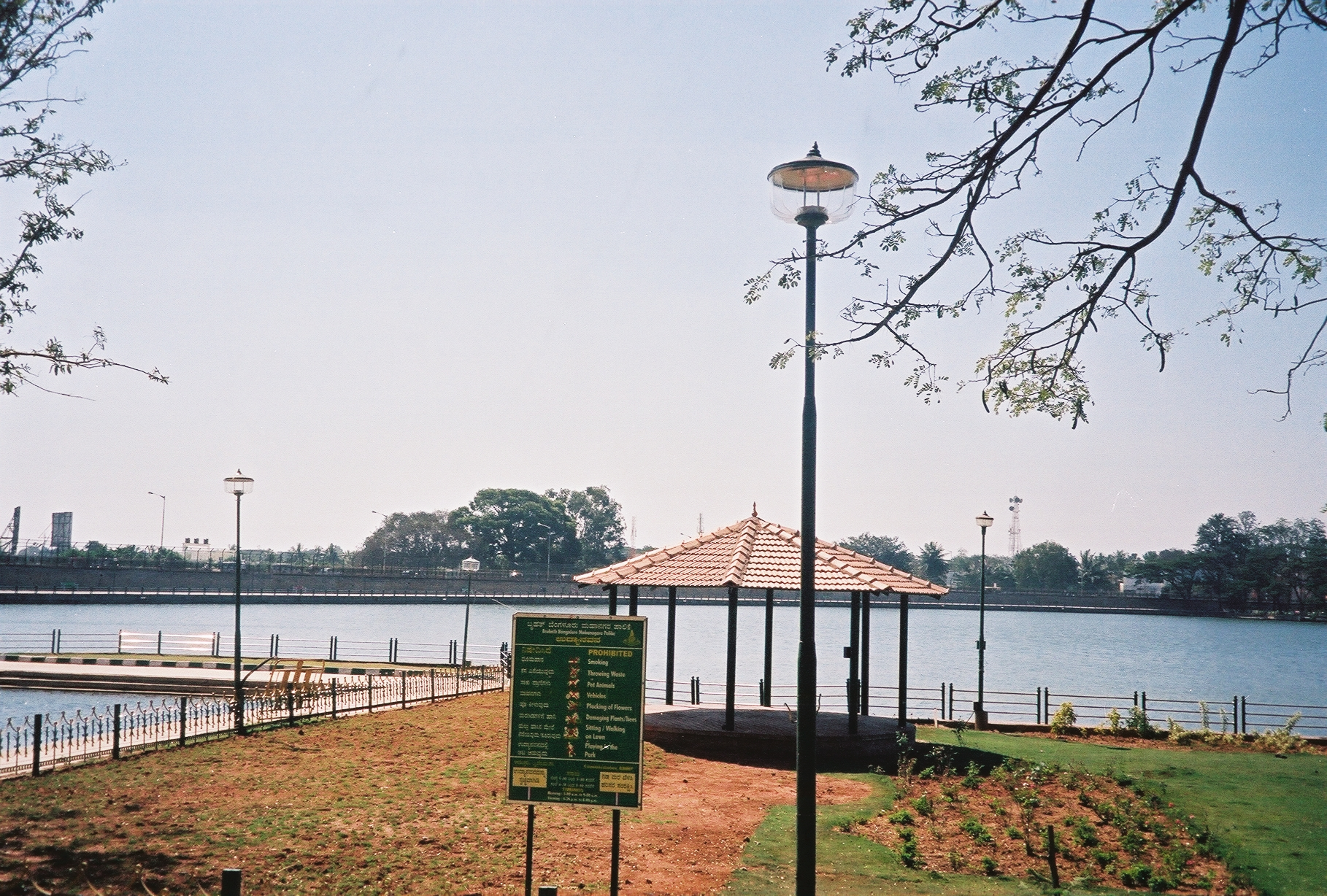
A view of the Sankey tank developed into a park.

In 2004, local builders' proposal to construct a multistory building in the Sankey tank bed was challenged by petitioners in the Karnataka Lok Adalat (Peoples Court, an adjunct of the High Court). But the Court was informed by the Bangalore Mahanagar Palike (BMP) that it had not sanctioned any plan for the proposed building and that it would take immediate action to prevent any such steps by the developer taken without a no-objection certificate from the Ministry of Environment and Forests.

The Lok Adalat ordered the Forest Department to repossess 0.52 ha (1.3 acres) of land belonging to it from the real estate developers who had set out to build an apartment block there. The Lake Development Authority also recommended that no construction or development activity should be allowed within a distance of 100 m (328.1 ft) from lakes in order to ensure that the water bodies in the city are not encroached and their conservation and protection are not stalled. The Karnataka State Pollution Control Board (KSPCB) informed the court that the proposal of Abhishek Builders and Mantri Developers to build an 18–floor luxury apartment block near the Sankey Tank has been turned down as gross violations were noted under the Air (Prevention and Control of Pollution) Act and the Water (Prevention and Control of Pollution) Act.

== See also ==
- Lakes in Bangalore
