= Economy of Bengaluru =

Big network of Karnataka

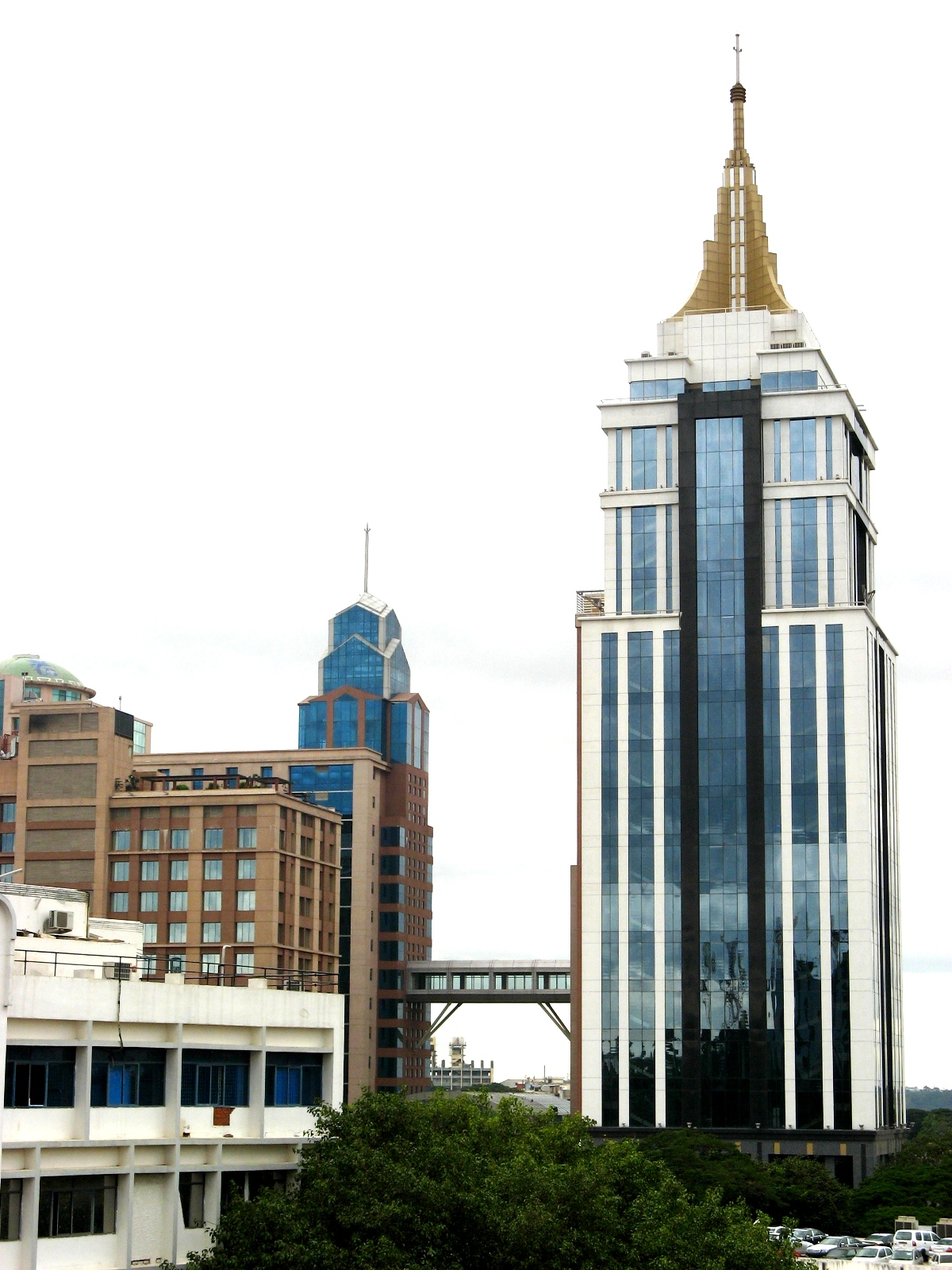
United Breweries Group headquarters at UB City, Bangalore. Which is a Central Business District and a major landmark of the city. Also the first luxury shopping mall in India.

The economy of Bengaluru, the state capital of Karnataka, is a highly developed and highly diversified economy that encompasses the largest metropolitan economy of South India. Bengaluru contributes over 43.65% to the economy of the State of Karnataka, and with projected GDP growth at 8.5%, Bangalore is the world's fastest growing city.

The estimated Metro GDP (PPP) of the city is around US$300 billion, with a Metro GDP (PPP) Per Capita of roughly US$25,461 in 2020. It has been ranked as one of the most productive metro areas in India. According to the estimates, Metro GDP (PPP) of the city has grown to US$590.4 billion as of 2024-2025. Bengaluru accounts for 98% of the Software Exports of Karnataka.

The establishment and success of high technology firms in Bangalore have led to the growth of Information Technology (IT) in India. As of 2020, IT firms in Bengaluru employed about 3.5 million employees in the IT and IT-enabled services (ITES)/BPM sectors, out of nearly 4.4 million employees across India, and accounted for the highest IT-related exports in the country. In 2014, Bangalore contributed US$45 billion, or 38% of India's total IT exports.

As of 2025, there are 875 Global capability centers in Bengaluru, compared to around 360 GCCs in Hyderabad, although recent trend shows that Hyderabad is attracting more GCCs set up in India. One of the important factors spurring Bengaluru's growth was heavy state government investment (and its environment) in Bangalore's public sector industries which is what makes it so developed and rich.

According to the Bangalore Innovation Report, with projected GDP growth of 8.5%, Bangalore will be the world's fastest growing city until 2035.

== Education ==
Bengaluru houses several of top-tier colleges including the Indian Institute of Management, Bangalore (IIMB), a top management Institute in India, the Indian Statistical Institute (ISI), the Indian Institute of Science (IISc), the Indian Institute of Astrophysics, the National Law School (NLSIU), National Institute of Mental Health and NeuroSciences (NIMHANS), The Indian Institute of Theoretical Sciences, National Institute of Design (NID), the Indian Institute of Information Technology and National Institute of Fashion Technology (NIFT).

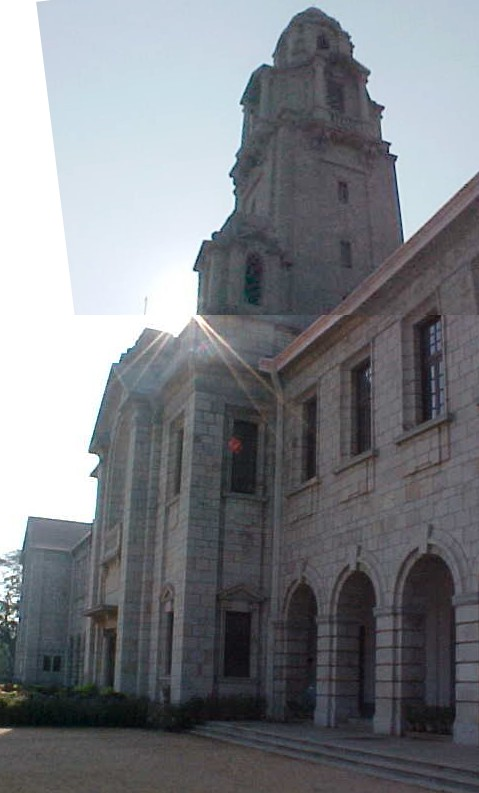
Indian Institute of Science

== Economic sectors ==
The earliest startups that were launched in the city in the 1990s include Infosys, Wipro Technologies, and Mindtree being popular ones and smaller ones include Tejas Networks. Flipkart, having originated in Bengaluru, acquired several other e-commerce companies like Myntra, and was eventually acquired by Walmart in 2018 for close to $20 Billion. Startup companies such as Swiggy, Ola Cabs, InMobi, Quikr, and RedBus are also based in the city.

Bengaluru is a favorable destination for industrial development. United Breweries Group is headquartered in Bengaluru. The city is an automobile production hub. Tata Hitachi Construction Machinery, Mahindra Electric, Bharat Earth Movers, Toyota Kirloskar Motor, Tesla India, and Ather Energy are headquartered in Bangalore within their operations. Robert Bosch GmbH, Mercedes-Benz, Volvo, General Motors, Royal Enfield, Honda Motorcycle and Scooter India, Scania AB, Larsen & Toubro have their plants and research & development (R&D) centers around Bengaluru. ABB, General Electric, and Tyco International have their research and development centers in Bengaluru. Aerospace industries are also popular around Bengaluru, which made it as Aviation Monopoly capital of India. Airbus, Boeing, Tata Advanced Systems, Indian Space Research Organisation, and Liebherr Aerospace have their units in Bengaluru. Bengaluru has also emerged as an electronics and hardware manufacturing hub in India. It houses Dell, Nokia, Philips, and Wistron manufacturing and R&D units. Public sector undertakings (PSUs) such as Bharat Electronics Limited (BEL), Hindustan Aeronautics Limited (HAL), National Aerospace Laboratories (NAL), Bharat Earth Movers Limited (BEML), Central Manufacturing Technology Institute (CMTI), HMT (formerly Hindustan Machine Tools) and Rail Wheel Factory (RWF). SKF also has a plant in the city.

=== Information Technology ===
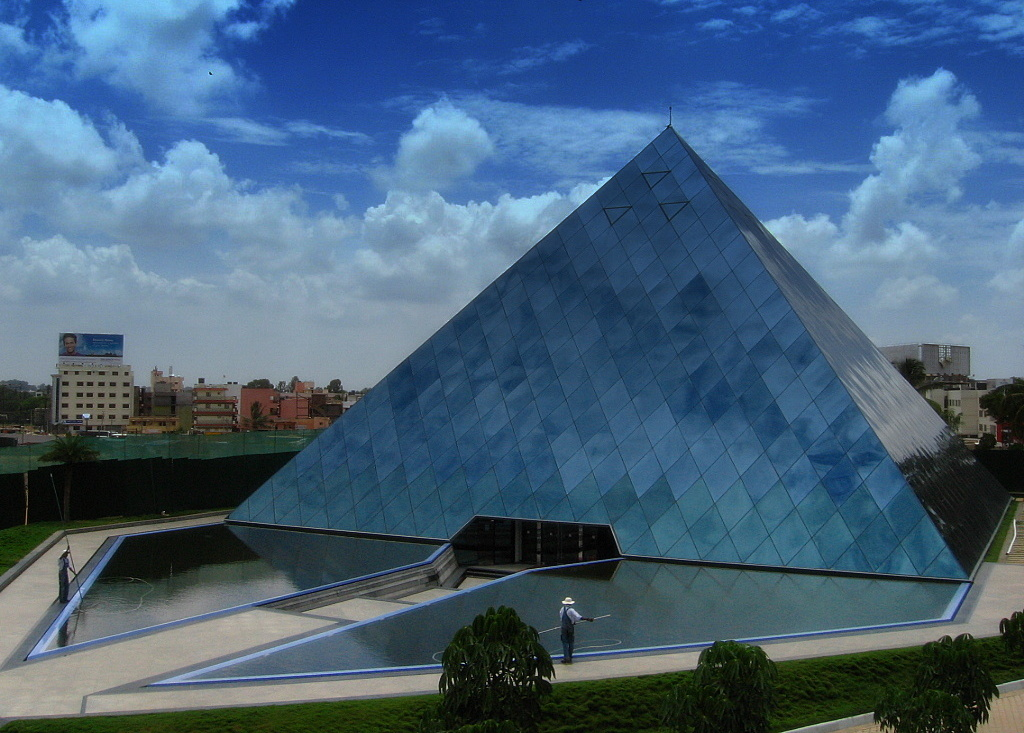
Infosys headquarters at Electronic City

Bengaluru is known for its IT industry, housing companies like Infosys, Mphasis, Wipro, Tata Consultancy Services, Nasdaq, Facebook, Google, and Microsoft etc. India's two largest IT companies – Infosys and Wipro to name a few have their headquarters here in Bengaluru. Electronic City is a place in Bengaluru, which houses IT companies in Bengaluru along with Infosys headquarters. Whitefield is another major suburb housing many IT companies. It is called as "The Silicon Valley of India' and "IT Capital of India".

=== Aerospace and aviation ===
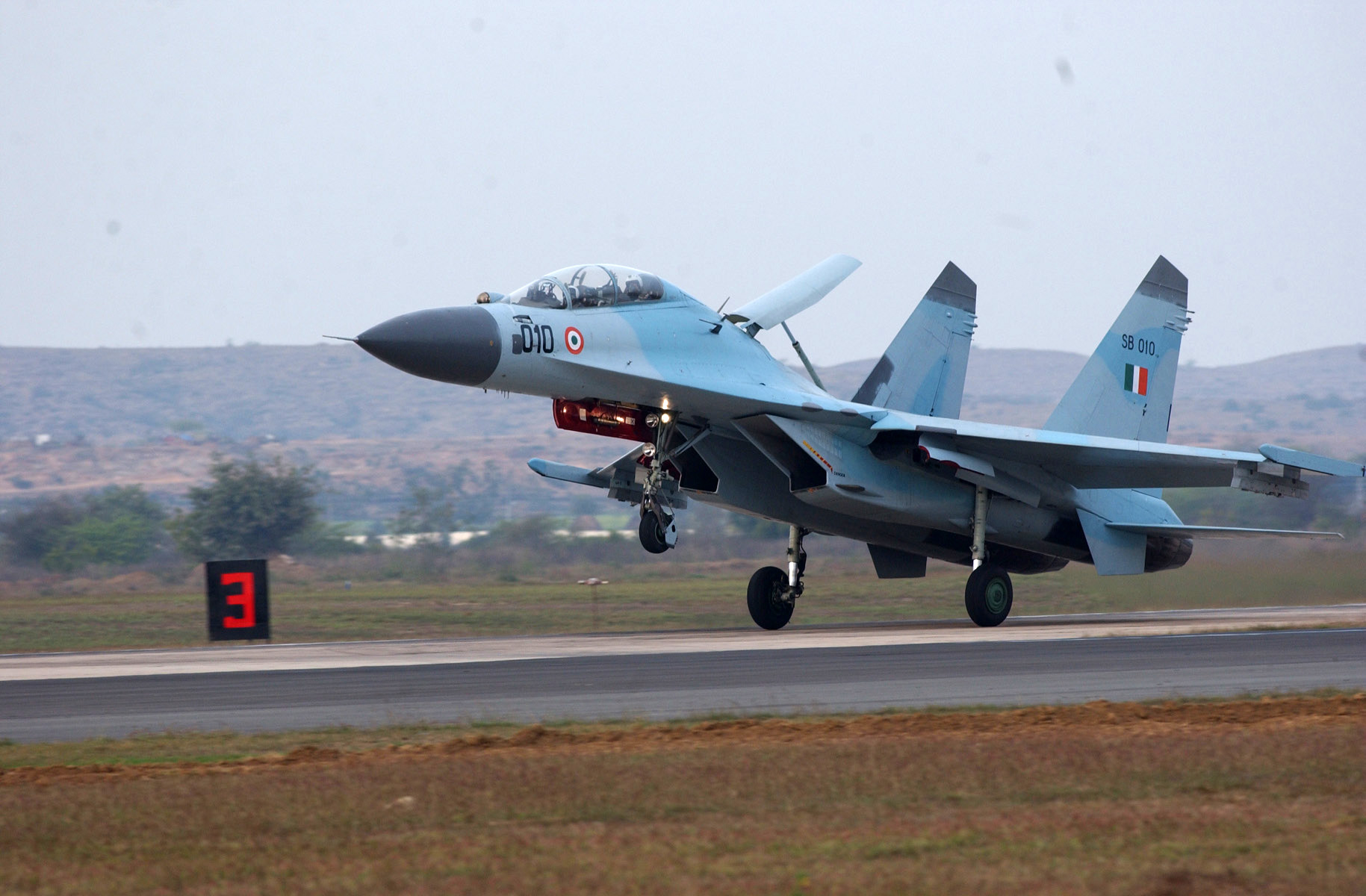
The Sukhoi-30MKI is a dual-role fighter that is manufactured under license of Sukhoi by Bangalore-based Hindustan Aeronautics Limited for the Indian Air Force.

Bengaluru is also called the aviation monopoly capital of India. It accounts for more than 65% of India's aerospace business. World Aerospace giants such as Boeing, Airbus, Dynamatics, Honeywell, GE Aviation, UTL, others have their Research & Development and Engineering centres.

Before Bengaluru was called the Silicon Valley of India, the city made its name as headquarters to some of the largest public sector companies of India such as ITI, NGEF, BEML, BEL, BHEL, RWF etc. The Hindustan Aeronautics Limited (HAL) headquarters is in Bangalore, and is dedicated to research and development activities for indigenous fighter aircraft for the Indian Air Force. With over 9,500 employees, it is one of the largest public sector employers in Bengaluru. More than 36,000 employees work with these PSU’s which provide major employment in the city.

Today, HAL manufactures, under license, various fighter aircraft for the Indian Air Force (IAF) including Sukhoi 30 Flankers and Jaguars. HAL also develops indigenous products for the IAF such as HAL Tejas, Aeronautical Development Agency, HAL Dhruv and HAL HF-24 Marut. Aeronautical Development Agency is also headquartered in Bengaluru.

The National Aerospace Laboratories (NAL) is also headquartered in Bengaluru and is dedicated to the development of civil aviation technologies. Incorporated in 1960, NAL often works in conjunction with the HAL and has a staff strength of over 1,300 employees. NAL also investigates aircraft malfeasance.

A 1,000-acre (4.0 km^{2}) special economic zone for the aerospace industry is being set up near the Kempegowda International Airport. Bangalore was also home to large domestic airlines – now defunct Simplifly Deccan and Kingfisher Airlines.

=== Biotechnology ===
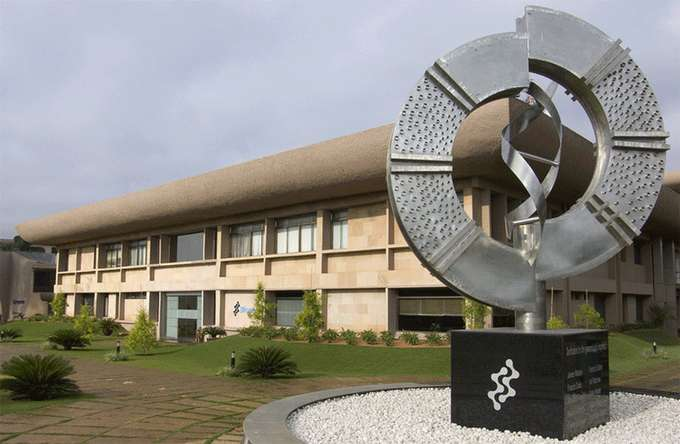
Biocon, headquartered in Bangalore, is one of India's largest biotechnology companies.

Biotechnology is a rapidly expanding field in the city. Bengaluru accounts for at least 97 of the approximately 240 biotechnology companies in India. Interest in Bengaluru as a base for biotechnology companies stems from Karnataka's comprehensive biotechnology policy, described by the Karnataka Vision Group on Biotechnology. In 2003–2004, Karnataka attracted the maximum venture capital funding for biotechnology in the country – $8 million. Biocon, headquartered in Bengaluru, is the nation's leading biotechnology company and ranks 16th in the world in revenues.

Institute of Bioinformatics and Applied Biotechnology (IBAB), initiated by Biotechnology vision group, ICICI and Biocon (located at ITPL) is trying to shape revolutionary scientists in the field.

Like the software industry which initially drew most of its workforce from the local public sector engineering industries, the biotechnology industry had access to talent from the National Center of Biological Sciences (NCBS) and the Indian Institute of Science (IISc).

=== Manufacturing ===
Other heavy industries in Bengaluru include Bharat Electronics Limited, Bharat Heavy Electricals Limited (BHEL), Indian Telephone Industries (ITI), Bharat Earth Movers Limited (BEML), HMT (formerly Hindustan Machine Tools), Hindustan Motors (HM) and ABB Group.

Bengaluru is also becoming a destination for the automotive industry. Volvo and many other auto suppliers have manufacturing plants in Bangalore.

Bengaluru houses many small and medium scale industries in its Peenya industrial area that claimed to be one of the biggest in Asia 30-years ago; newly including Apple's India manufacturing plant – the only active plant in the world outside of China.

=== Other sectors ===
The city has several types of entrepreneurial pursuits that have shaped it along the way from the early '90s. The city is known for several restaurateurs who innovated on fast service models commonly called Darshini restaurants that served hot breakfast and beverages. Orkla Foods, the Norwegian foods company bought MTR Foods, traditional ready-to-eat consumer goods brand in 2007 for approximately $60m. A recent $100m brand is ID foods, fast becoming popular in retail. Swiggy an on-demand food delivery Unicorn is popular along with Zomato, a restaurant review, listing and food delivery business, that initially started in Bangalore. FreshMenu is a near-unicorn cloud kitchen business that only delivers via mobile apps and other on-demand food apps. Cafe Coffee Day, a listed entity is a coffee store chain with stores in Prague, Bratislava, Riga and Warsaw. Chai Point is a chain of tea stores founded in Bangalore in 2010.

Several Venture Capital funded startups like housing.com, nestaway, nobroker, commonfloor.com (acquired by the Unicorn, Quikr) are disrupting the rental marketplace in India. Several listed real estate brands have their origins in the city like Prestige Group, Brigade Enterprises, Total Environment and Sobha Developers.

India's largest indigenous OEM, Hindustan Aeronautics Limited (HAL) had its headquarters in India. Several smaller tier 1 and tier 2 suppliers had their base in the city to serve the OEM need. The National Aerospace Laboratories (NAL) is also headquartered in Bangalore and is dedicated to the development of civil aviation technologies. Bangalore also housed now-defunct full-service airline brand Kingfisher Airlines, which acquired another airline startup, Air Deccan, a budget airline.

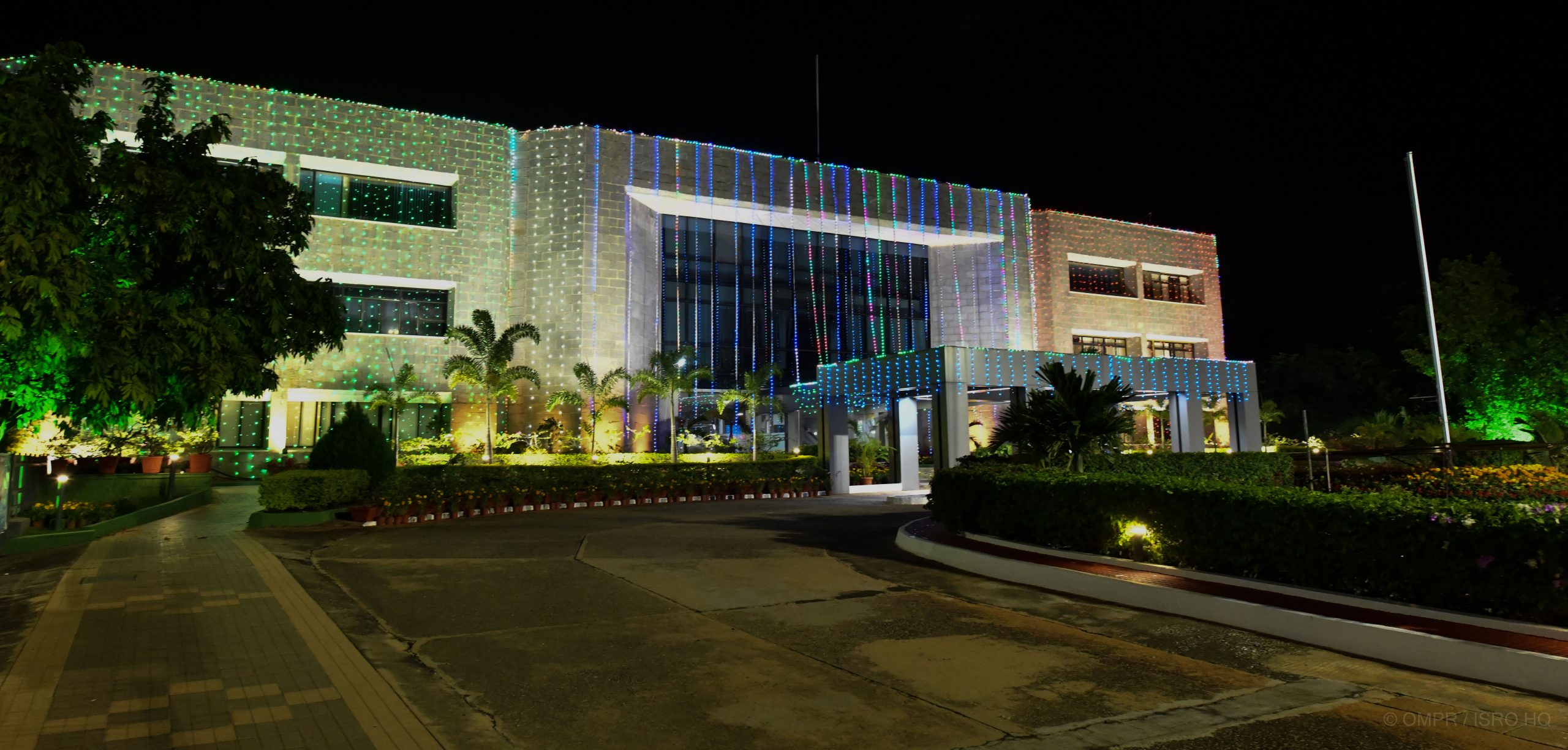
ISRO Headquarters at Bengaluru

The Indian Space Research Organization (ISRO), one of the top national space agencies in the world is headquartered in the city. ISRO is recognized world over for its indigenous capabilities in launching low cost satellites using its own launch vehicles, the PSLV and the GSLVs. ISRO has a record of deploying 104 satellites in orbits successfully in a single launch, which is a world record. ISRO has also launched a Mars mission, which was the lowest cost inter-planetary orbital mission. Startups have made attempts to launch lunar rovers and are analysing satellite images to uses in agriculture and climate.

Bangalore is the home of India's first electric car brand, Reva was acquired by a large domestic car company, Mahindra & Mahindra. Several startups in automotive services, marketplaces are situated in the city. On-demand taxi service, Ola Cabs, a Unicorn, originated in the city and acquired its early competition and peer, taxiforsure. Bounce is an on-demand motorbike startup that originated in the city. Car rental companies operating in the city includes Avis, Carzonrent, Hype Luxury Mobility, Mylescars, Revvcar and Zoomcar. Zoomcar is on demand inter city car transportation startup running out of the city. RedBus is an intercity bus aggregator that was bought by Naspers group.

BigBasket.com, Zopnow.com and Zopper.com, started in on-demand grocery and compete with Amazon's Prime Now platform. Offline, formal retail format grocers originating from the city include FoodWorld supermarkets that started in 1996 and several other local brands.

Urban Ladder is a leading omnichannel commerce furniture retailer founded by entrepreneurs from the city. Lifestyle, now part of Dubai-based Landmark group originated as a brand in Bangalore in 1999. Tanishq is a jewelry retail store brand and is owned by the Tata Group. Printo is a chain of stationery and printing services stores.

World Trade Center, Bangalore at Malleswaram is part of an integrated enclave housing companies, mall, hospital, school and apartments

Several fintechs have their origins in the city. The revolutionary low-cost brokerage firm Zerodha, several cryptocurrency exchanges. Pine Labs is a recent unicorn that builds POS systems. Capillary Technologies is a loyalty, analytics provider built over POS systems. QwikCilver, a gifting and loyalty platform founded in Bangalore was acquired by Amazon.

The city is known for its craft breweries, popular ones being Toit, Arbor Brewing Company and others. Kingfisher is one of the world's largest beer brands that originated in Bangalore. Amrut is India's first Single Malt Whisky brand. United Breweries Group has its headquarters in Bangalore. It produces Kingfisher (beer).

Biocon is one of India's largest pharmaceutical companies founded in Bengaluru.

The Himalaya Wellness Company makes several pharma and beauty care products and is headquartered in Bangalore.

Wildcraft, a fast-growing outdoor adventure goods company was founded in the city. Zivame is an online commerce lingerie company fast growing into the number 1 brand in India.

DTDC is an asset light logistics company built by first generation entrepreneurs in the city.

Many wine yards are springing up around the city due to interest among a globally aware community of people residing in the city. Bangalore is also India's largest export of roses, about 70% of all rose exports come from the city.

Samsung Electronics In 2018, Samsung Electronics opened a mobile experience center in Bengaluru's historic Opera House. The facility, spanning 33,000 square feet, combines modern technology with the building's original architecture, which dates back to the British era and was restored over two years. The center features interactive experiences, including VR-based attractions such as 4D motion chairs and simulations of activities like piloting aircraft or space exploration. The space is designed to showcase Samsung's technological innovations and provide visitors with immersive experiences.

== Economic zones in the city ==
There are several economic clusters, as in many cities in the world, in the city.

- Chickpete area is known for textile trades and early entrepreneurs in the city
- Shivajinagar area houses auto spares and services clusters
- Whitefield was a neighboring town to Bangalore, but over time has been assimilated into the city. Whitefield houses several Information Technology Parks and many global firms have their India headquarters located in the area.
- Koramangala and JP Nagar have traditionally been the area where tech startups take birth
- Electronics City houses all the major IT service providers of India

== Government incentives and programs ==
Tax holiday for IT services: The Government of Karnataka was the first state government to introduce a tax holiday for IT service companies to set up shop in the city to earn a decade-long corporate tax holiday to incentivize the industry.

IT SEZ program: Server IT Special economic Zones are now set up where they receive a corporate tax holiday if offices are situated in those zones.

Ministry of IT: One of the early states in India to have a Ministerial position for Information Technology. This was created to address the issues faced by the industry in terms of physical and digital infrastructure, and supply of graduates.

Adoption of Technology in Government programs: Multiple government initiatives have included digitization of citizen programs and Karnataka has been at the forefront of adoption of technology. The Regional Transport Office in the city are fully computerized and they the earliest to do so. Bangalore also achieved full computerization of the Indian Passport Distribution process, first in the country.

The digital office of the Income Tax Department of India is based in Bangalore. The need for the build of systems to collect and refund taxes for millions of citizens and need for data analytics and AI to prevent fraud meant that Bangalore city was an obvious choice for the same.

== See also ==
- Economy of Karnataka
