= Milk Colony =

Neighbourhood in Bangalore, India

Milk Colony is a small layout situated in Malleswaram in Bangalore. Milk Colony gets its name from the profession of the community who settled down there during the 1960s. Milk Colony is adjacent to the World Trade Center Bengaluru. People here speak predominantly Kannada.

== Location ==
Milk Colony is bordered with Yeshwantpur, Malleswaram and Rajajinagar. It is situated next to the Brigade Gateway. ISKCON Sri Radha Krishna temple is the nearest place of attraction, and Yeshwantpur and Malleswaram are the nearest railway stations.

The erstwhile Raja Mill (Mantri Greens now occupies this plot) workers were given houses at this place and was called Raja Mill Colony, which later on was shortened to Milk Colony. If the older gazettes or the older property papers mention it as Krishnrajawodeyar Mill colony.

Nadaprabhu Kempegowda Stadium and Krantiveera Sangolli Rayanna Park are both located within Milk Colony.
