= Sumit Jain =

Indian software engineer and Internet entrepreneur

- Born: June 13, 1984 (age 41)
- Education: Indian Institute of Technology Roorkee
- Occupations: Co-Founder & CEO Unacademy Test Prep. Co-founder and CEO Graphy.com
- Known for: Commonfloor.com; Unacademy
- Website: www.linkedin.com/in/sumjain

Sumit Jain (born 13 June 1984) is an Indian software engineer and Internet entrepreneur. He started online real-estate portal Commonfloor.com for property seekers in 2007. Prior to that, he used to work with Oracle. As the co-founder and CEO, Sumit is responsible for driving the strategic direction for CommonFloor as well as delivering on company goals. On 7 January 2016, the classifieds advertising platform Quikr announced that they acquired CommonFloor. After 1 year of acquisition, Sumit moved out of Quikr. In July 2017, Sumit along with Co-founder Ashwani Jain launched Opentalk, a social voice app aimed to help users become better at speaking English by talking with other English speakers. Sumit is now the Co-founder & CEO of Graphy.com, a platform to help the creators grow their audience, monetize their skills, and host live cohort-based courses. Sumit has been elevated to partner/co-founder & board member at Unacademy and CEO Unacademy Test Prep.

== Early life ==
Born and brought up in Khatauli, a small town in Uttar Pradesh, India. Sumit's father had a shop where he sold building products, in which he spent most of his time when a child, and sometimes his father left the store under his care for days, telling him not to call him for any reason.

== Career ==
Sumit graduated as a computer engineer from the Indian Institute of Technology Roorkee in 2006. After a short spell with Oracle Server Technologies, he decided to start his own business and in 2007 he started Commonfloor.com with Lalit Mangal and Vikas Malpani. He sold CommonFloor to Quikr in Jan 2016 and worked with Quikr for a year. He started Opentalk in 2017 along with Ashwani Jain. He Co-founded Graphy.com in 2020 along with Sushil Kumar, Shobhit Bakliwal, and Fiona Leong. Sumit has been elevated to partner/co-founder & board member at Unacademy and CEO Unacademy Test Prep.

== Awards and recognition ==
- Fortune 40 Under 40
- Dataquest's list of the 25 Hot Indian Web 2.0 start-ups
- Business World Hottest Young Entrepreneurs
- Listed in Power Profiles in India for the year of 2015
- Younger Achiever of the Year 2015' by National Awards for Excellence in Real Estate & Infrastructure
