= Urban Oasis Mall =

- Location: Hubballi, Karnataka; India
- Address: Gokul Industrial Estate, Gokul Road, Hubli CIty, Hubballi-Dharwad - 580030
- Opened: 2011
- Developer: Samhrutha Habitat Infrastructure Private Limited
- Num. of stores: 110
- Num. of anchor tenants: 17
- Floor area: 3,75,000 sq ft
- Floors: 5
- Parking: Multi floor Parking(over 200 4-wheeler's)

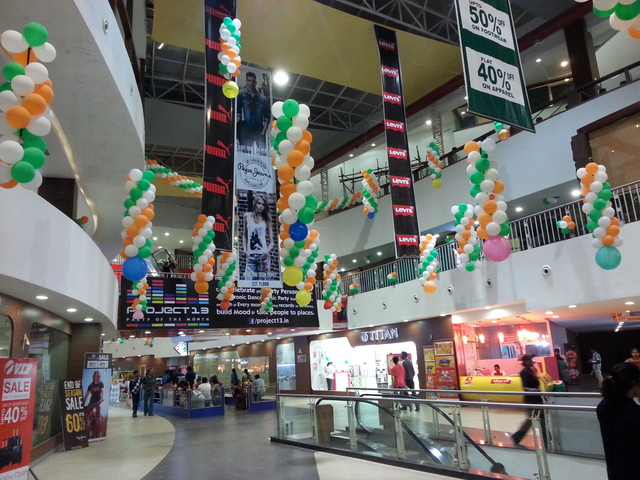
Inside the main entrance of the Urban Oasis Mall, Gokul Road, Hubballi

Urban Oasis Mall is the largest shopping mall in North Karnataka in the Indian city of Hubballi.

== Mall ==
Urban Oasis Mall is the second mall to open in Hubli city, the commercial hub of Karnataka. It is the largest mall in North Karnataka. The mall has a frontage of 360 feet. The Mall's portfolio includes Retail, F&B, restropub, entertainment (amusement & gaming), a food court (over 8 kitchens and seating capacity of 300), cineplex (5 screens with over 1150 capacity).

== Anchor stores ==
- Pantaloons
- Reliance Trendz
- Mochi
- Raymond's
- Reliance Digital
- Toshiba
- Titan
- Puma
- Levi's
- People
- Planet Fashion
- Feather Lite
- John Players
- Pepe Jeans
- Wildcraft
- Fabindia
- Killer
- Walmart Easyday
- Woodland

== Eateries ==
- KFC
- Domino's Pizza
- Cafe Coffee Day
- Coolberryz
- Ching's
- Goli
- Seven beans
- Polar Bear

== Entertainment ==
- Cinepolis - 5 Screen Multiplex
- Masti Funzone - Arcade gaming center, 9D theater, shooting range etc.
