= Zoomcar =

Indian car rental company

Zoomcar Holdings, Inc.
- Type: Public
- Traded as: Nasdaq: ZCAR
- Industry: Car rental
- Founded: February 2013; 13 years ago
- Founders: Greg Moran; David Back
- Headquarters: Bangalore, Karnataka, India
- Areas served: India, South East Asia, Middle East and North Africa
- Services: Carsharing
- Revenue: ▲US$9.16 million (2026)
- Net income: ▲ −US$14.6 million (2026)
- Website: www.zoomcar.com

Zoomcar is an Indian carsharing platform, headquartered in Bangalore. Founded in 2013 by David Back and Greg Moran, it currently operates in more than 34 cities.

== History ==
American duo David Back and Greg Moran met while studying at the University of Pennsylvania, where both graduated in 2007. After graduating, Back studied at Harvard Law School and Moran worked on energy financing projects. The pair also attended business school; Moran at the University of Southern California and Back at the Judge Business School at Cambridge University.

Back and Moran both dropped out of business school to move to India and pursue a venture in car rentals. Zoom officially launched operations in Bangalore in February 2013 using JustShareIt platform. Zoom started with $215,000 in capital and a fleet of seven cars.

In May 2015, Back resigned from the company, and moved back to the US citing personal reasons.

In December 2023, Zoomcar merged with Innovative International Acquisition Corporation (IOAC), a special-purpose acquisition company, to become listed on the Nasdaq as Zoomcar Holdings Inc.

In June 2024, CEO Greg Moran was fired months after the U.S. Securities and Exchange Commission had flagged concerns about the company's revenue projections.

== Investors ==
Zoom initially raised capital from individual investors including Former US Treasury Secretary Lawrence Summers, Chair of the UK Institute of Directors Lady Barbara Judge, Vice-Dean of International Legal Studies at Harvard Law School William P. Alford, Wharton Statistics Chair Edward George, and the former Director of the Cambridge Centre for Entrepreneurial Studies Shai Vyakarnam. Back met Summers at Harvard University, where Back was a teaching assistant to Summers.

Zoomcar's institutional investors include: Mahindra & Mahindra, Ford Motor Company, Sequoia Capital, Nokia Growth Partners, FundersClub, Basset Investment Group, Athene Capital, Empire Angels, VentureSouq, OurCrowd, Globevestor., and Cyber Carrier CL. Zoomcar has also raised money from former Infosys CFO T.V. Mohandas Pai and his business partner Abhay Jain.

== Competition ==
Zoomcar faces competition from Revv Cars, Drivezy, MylesCars (backed by Carzonrent), Ola Drive by (Ola Cabs) and other similar car rental companies.

== Partnerships ==
Zoom partnered with the auto manufacturers like Ford & Mahindra which allowed them to become the first car rental company in India to offer an electric vehicle (the Mahindra REVA E2O by Mahindra) and the Ford EcoSport "urban SUV by Ford" in 2013. Zoom also works with locally established real estate developers, universities, hotels, and corporate IT parks to secure parking for its vehicles and offer pick-up points to its members.

In November 2013, Zoom, Uber, and the Ashoka Foundation launched a month-long campaign in Bangalore called RideSmartBLR to encourage car-rental and discourage drunk driving for its health, economical and environmental benefits.

Zoom was a member of Microsoft's Accelerator Plus program in Bangalore in Spring 2014. This program is designed to provide more tailored assistance to later-stage start-ups as they scale their business and raise capital.

== Opposition ==
In July 2015, Zoomcar issued caution information to its customers following opposition from the Ladakh taxi union. Following an incident in which a convoy of 15 cars rented from the company was reportedly attacked by members of the union with stones and iron rods, Zoomcar issued a cautionary mail to customers traveling to Khardung La and Nubra valley. The following week Zoom issued an update stating that the situation had aggravated and the company urged extreme caution to customers traveling to the region. The taxi unions of Gulmarg and Ladakh continue to resist entry of non-local commercial cars in the region.

== Controversies ==
=== Banned advertisement ===
In December 2015, the Advertising Standards Council of India (ASCI) banned 54 controversial Indian ads which included a video advertisement by Zoomcar. The ad was found to be in violation of India's Dowry Prohibition Act, 1961 by the council, following which the advertisement was pulled off by the company.

=== Data breach ===
In July 2018, Zoomcar suffered a data breach exposing more the data of more than 3.5 million users including names, email and IP addresses, phone numbers and passwords.

=== Illegally renting whiteboard cars ===
Post covid, Zoomcar doesn't own and operate any cars on its own in India and has shifted to marketplace model, where private car owners (hosts) list their cars on Zoomcar, Zoomcar rents them to its customers, keeps a cut from earning and passes the rest to vehicle owners. Commercial use of whiteboard car is illegal in India.

=== Breaches of refund policy ===
In the year 2020, Zoomcar breached its refund policy of providing refunds within 7–14 days, extended it to 30 days but still haven't refunded their customers, some of whom have been waiting for more than 8 months as of 3 November 2020. A lot of their customers took to different social media websites like Twitter, Facebook and Instagram to report this issue. Their CEO, Greg Moran, when questioned about this stated that he isn't aware of any breach of policy from their side. Zoomcar has been replying to their customers' tweets saying that the refund will be processed soon without giving any confirmation on date and time.

== See also ==
- Carzonrent
