= Carzonrent =

Car Rental Company in India

Carzonrent (India) Private Limited
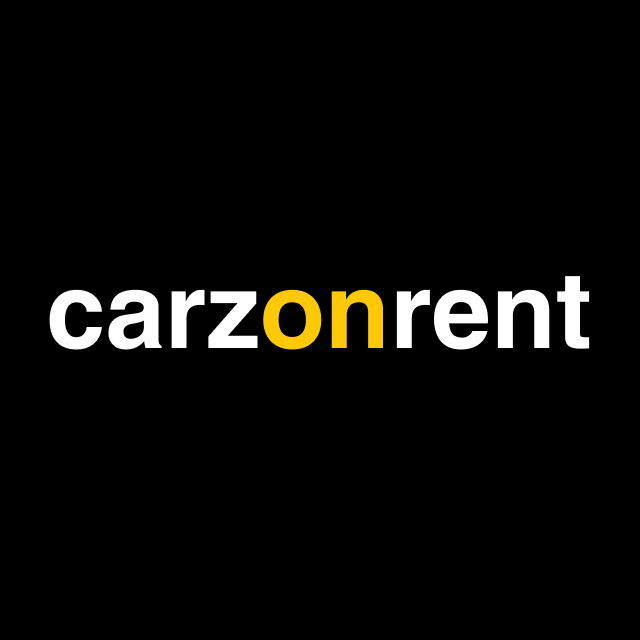
- Industry: Car rental
- Founded: 2000
- Founder: Rajiv Kumar Vij
- Headquarters: New Delhi, India
- Divisions: MylesCar
- Website: Carzonrent.com

Carzonrent India Private Limited (CIPL), better known as Carzonrent is an Indian car-rental company. The company is headquartered in New Delhi, India. Carzonrent was founded by Rajiv Kumar Vij in 2000. In 2001, Carzonrent won the exclusive franchisee rights for the American car rental firm Hertz International in India.

== History ==
Carzonrent was founded by Rajiv Kumar Vij in the year 2000 in New Delhi. The company offered chauffeur driven cars on hire, primarily to corporate clients.

Hertz awarded the exclusive franchisee rights for India to Carzonrent in 2001, leasing out 50 cars to the company which were plied chauffeur driven basis. In 2005, Hertz scaled its presence to 750 cars and commenced leasing services to corporate clients.

In 2006, Carzonrent launched its radio taxi service EasyCabs in the New Delhi, making it the first Indian company to offer car leasing and taxi services. The company commenced self-drive car rental service Myles in late 2013, almost one year after Zoomcar launched as the first self-drive car rental company in India.

== Partnerships ==
In June 2015, Carzonrent's radio taxi service EasyCabs associated with the Indian Railway Catering and Tourism Corporation (IRCTC) to provide cab services to railway passengers. Customers can pre-book an EasyCab while booking railway tickets on IRCTC's. The service is currently available only at the New Delhi Railway Station.

== Competition ==
Carzonrent competes with companies like Ola Cabs, Uber and Meru Cabs in the cab segment. In the self-drive car rental segment, the company competes with Zoomcar and Revv Cars.
