= Orion Mall =

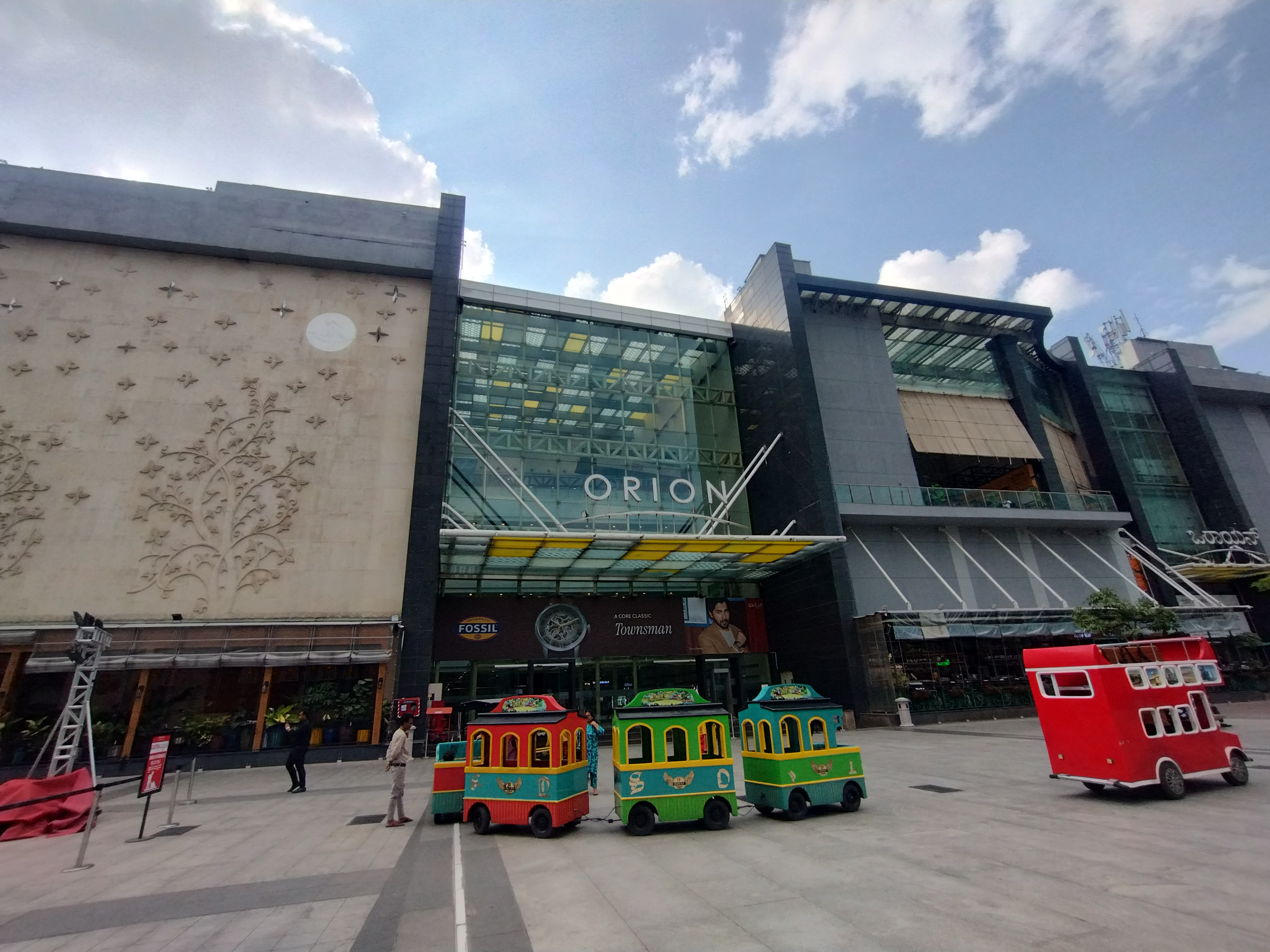
- Orion Mall at Brigade Gateway, Rajajinagar in 2025
- Location: Bengaluru, Karnataka, India
- Coordinates: 13.011180°N 77.555478°E
- Address: Dr. Rajkumar Road, Malleshwaram
- Opened: 2012
- Developer: Brigade Group
- Floor area: 8.2 lakh sq ft
- Floors: 4
- Parking: 2 Levels (1600 Cars) + MLCP (3600 Cars)
- Public transit: Green at Sandal Soap Factory
- Website: orionmalls.com

Orion Mall is a shopping mall at Brigade Gateway Enclave in Bengaluru, Karnataka, India developed by Brigade Group. The mall with a total shopping area of 820,000 square feet is the 3rd largest in Bangalore. Orion Mall opened in 2012.

== About ==
Orion Mall is part of a premium integrated enclave known as Brigade Gateway which also houses World Trade Center, Sheraton Grand Hotel, Columbia Asia Hospital on its premises. Orion Mall has four floors of retail space which include shopping zones, a multiplex, food and beverage stores, and bowling & gaming zones.

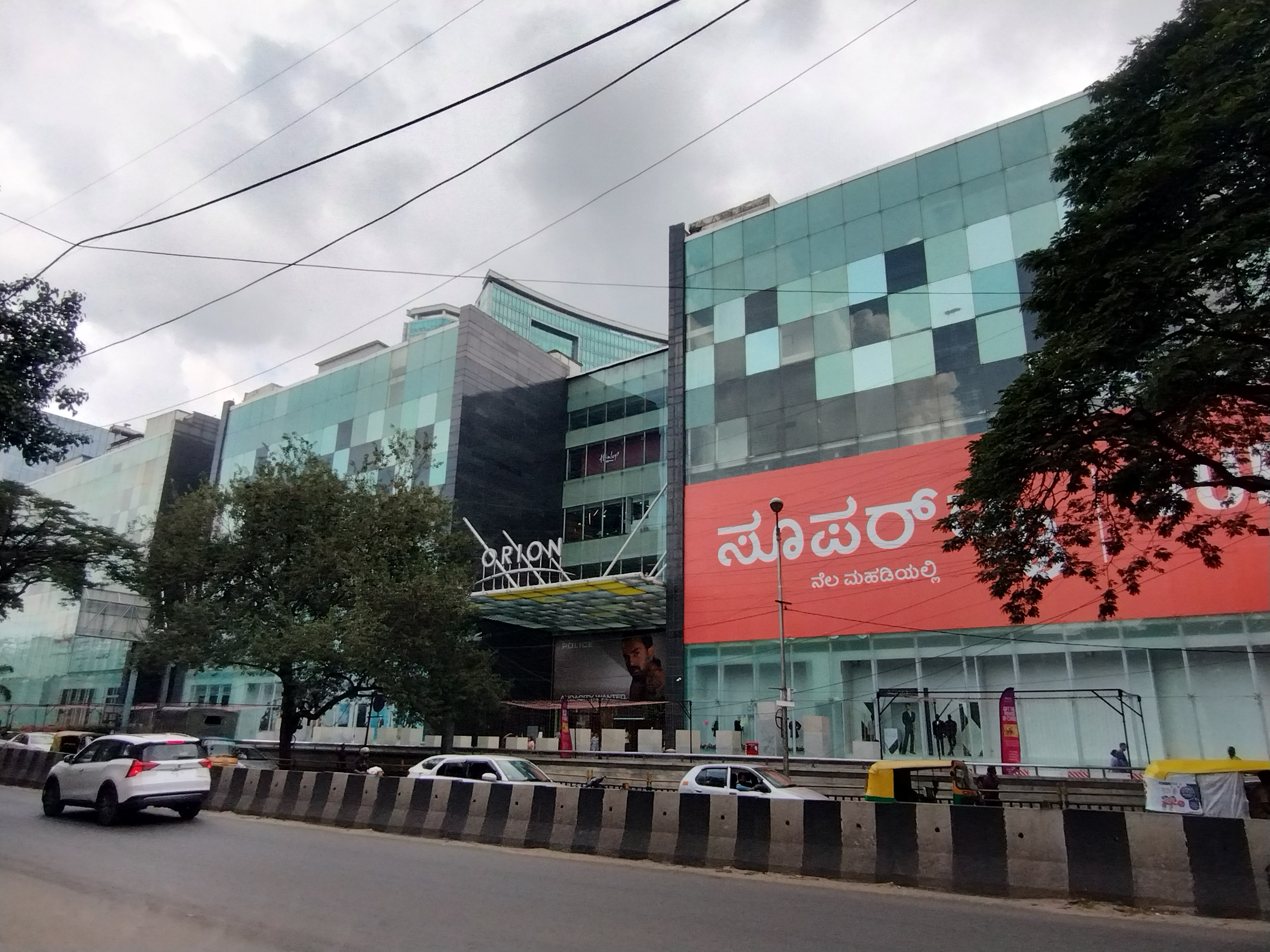
Orion Mall, Bengaluru

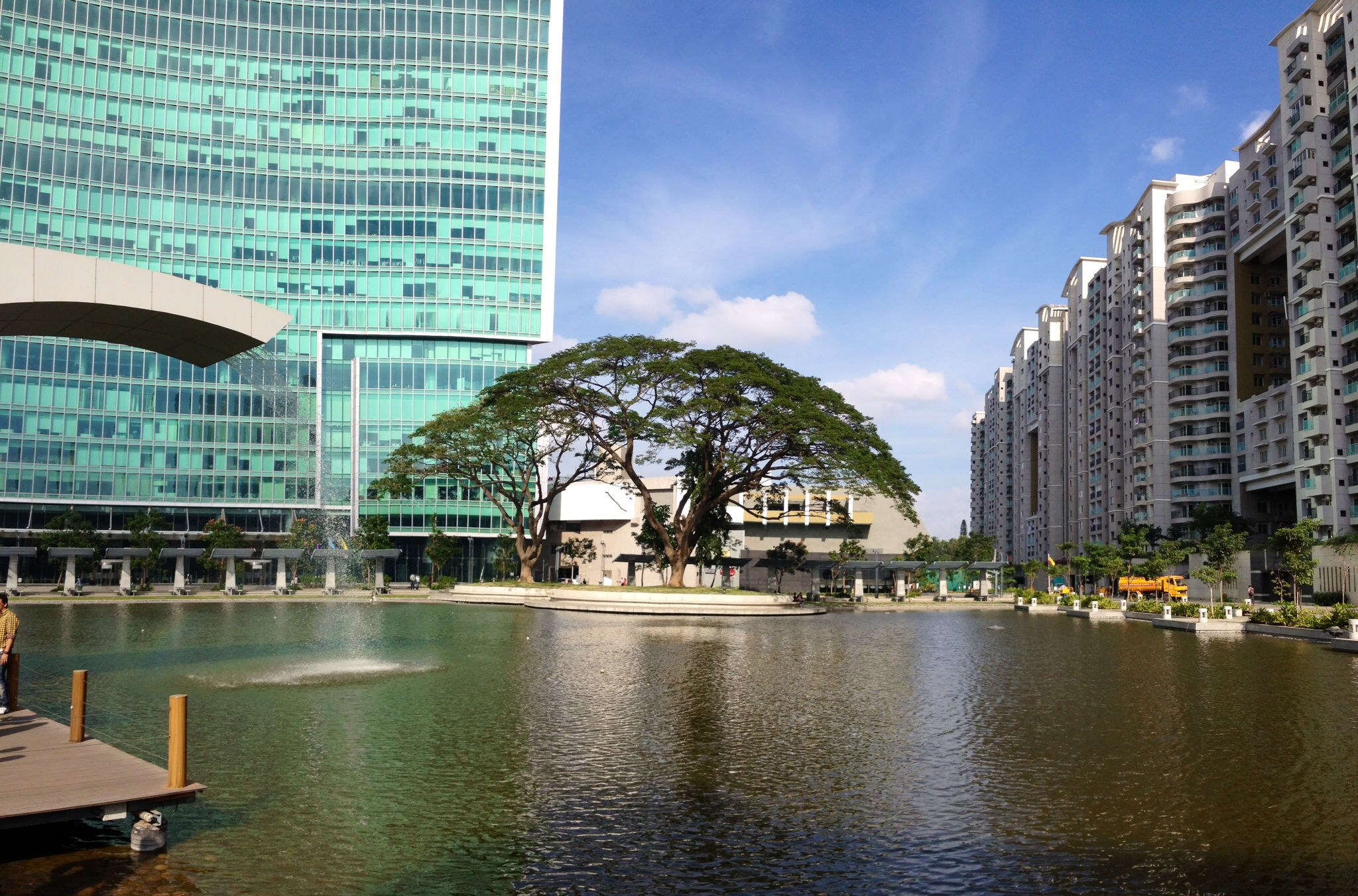
Outside view

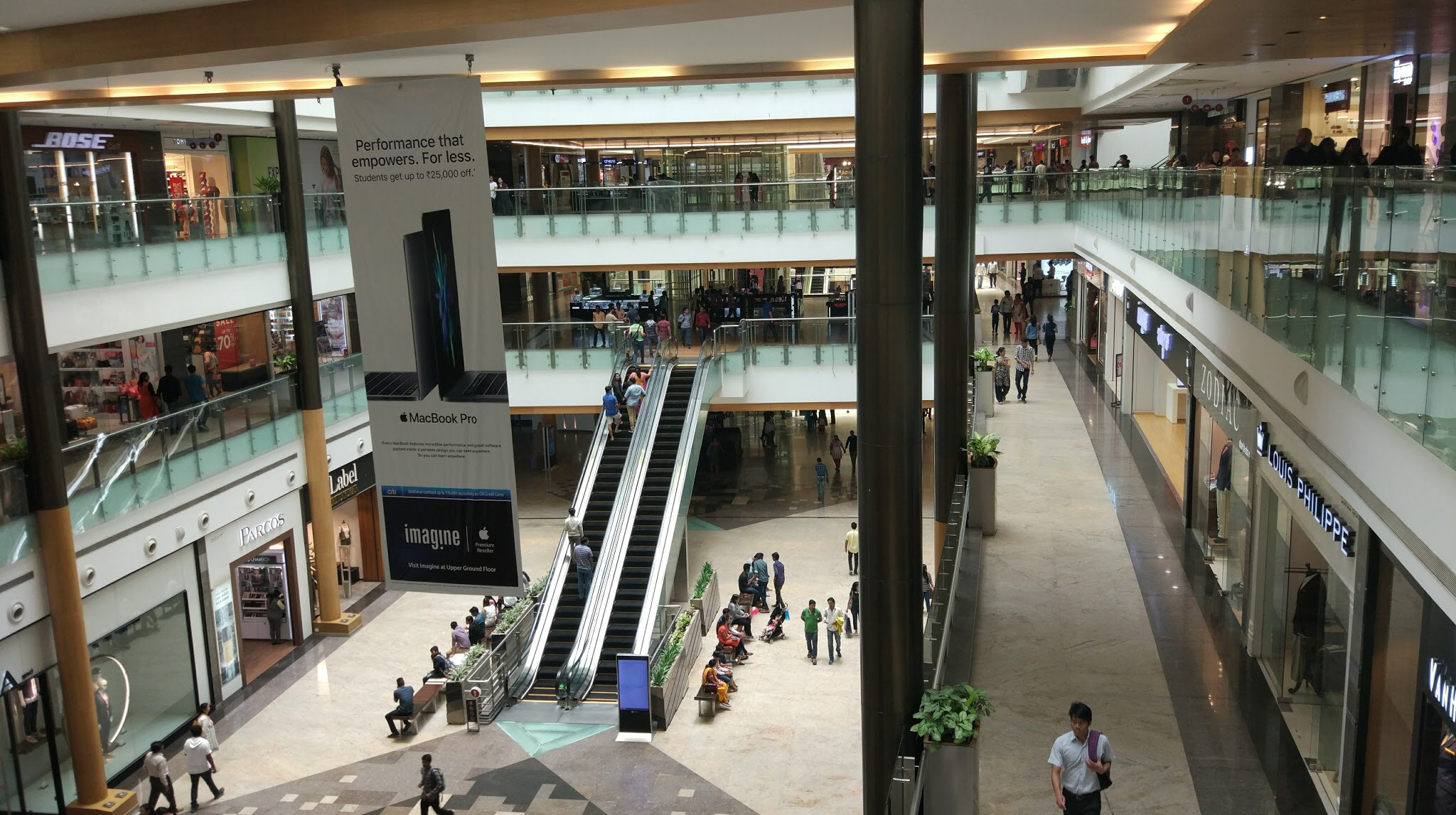
Inside view

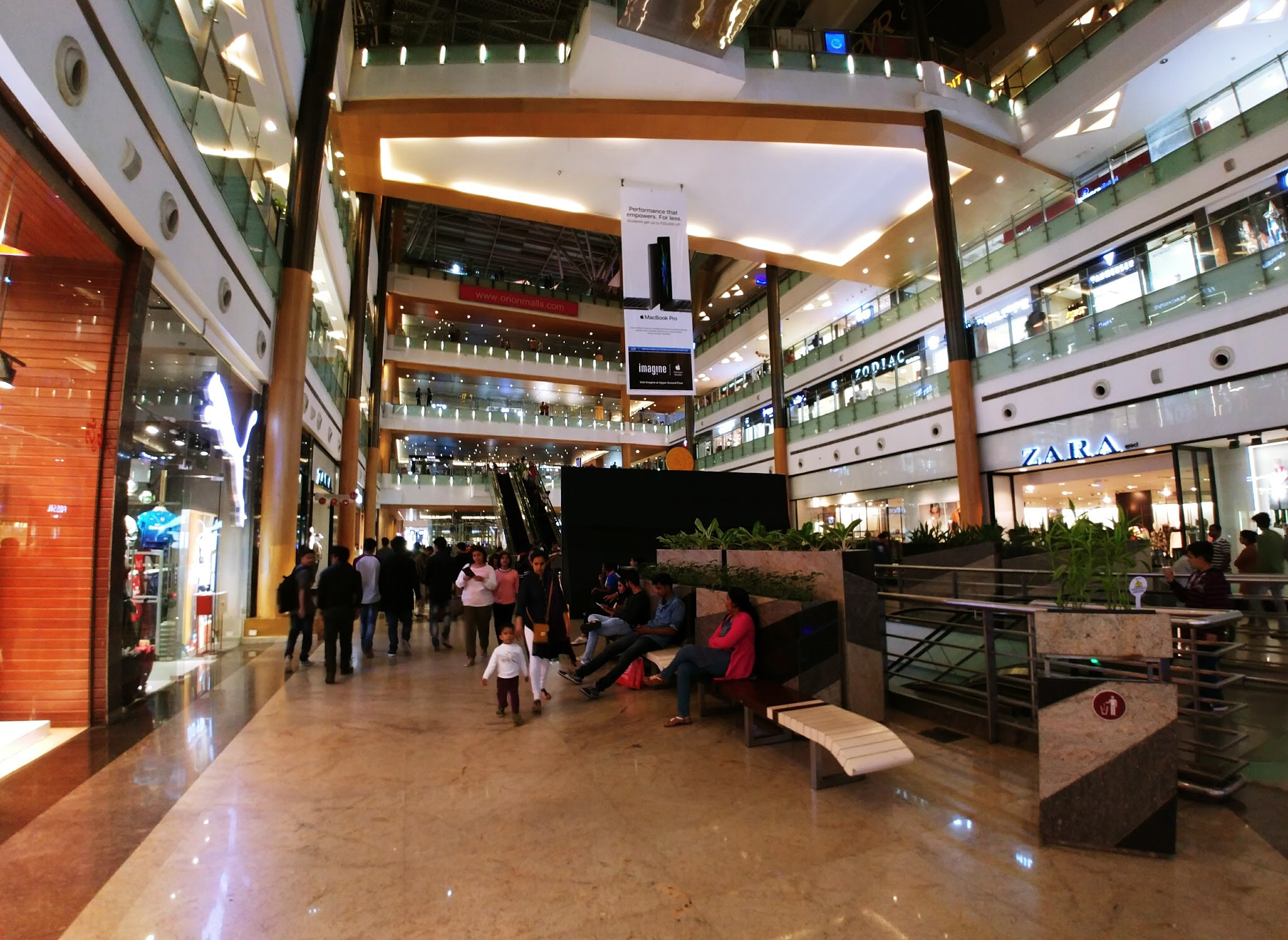
Internal view

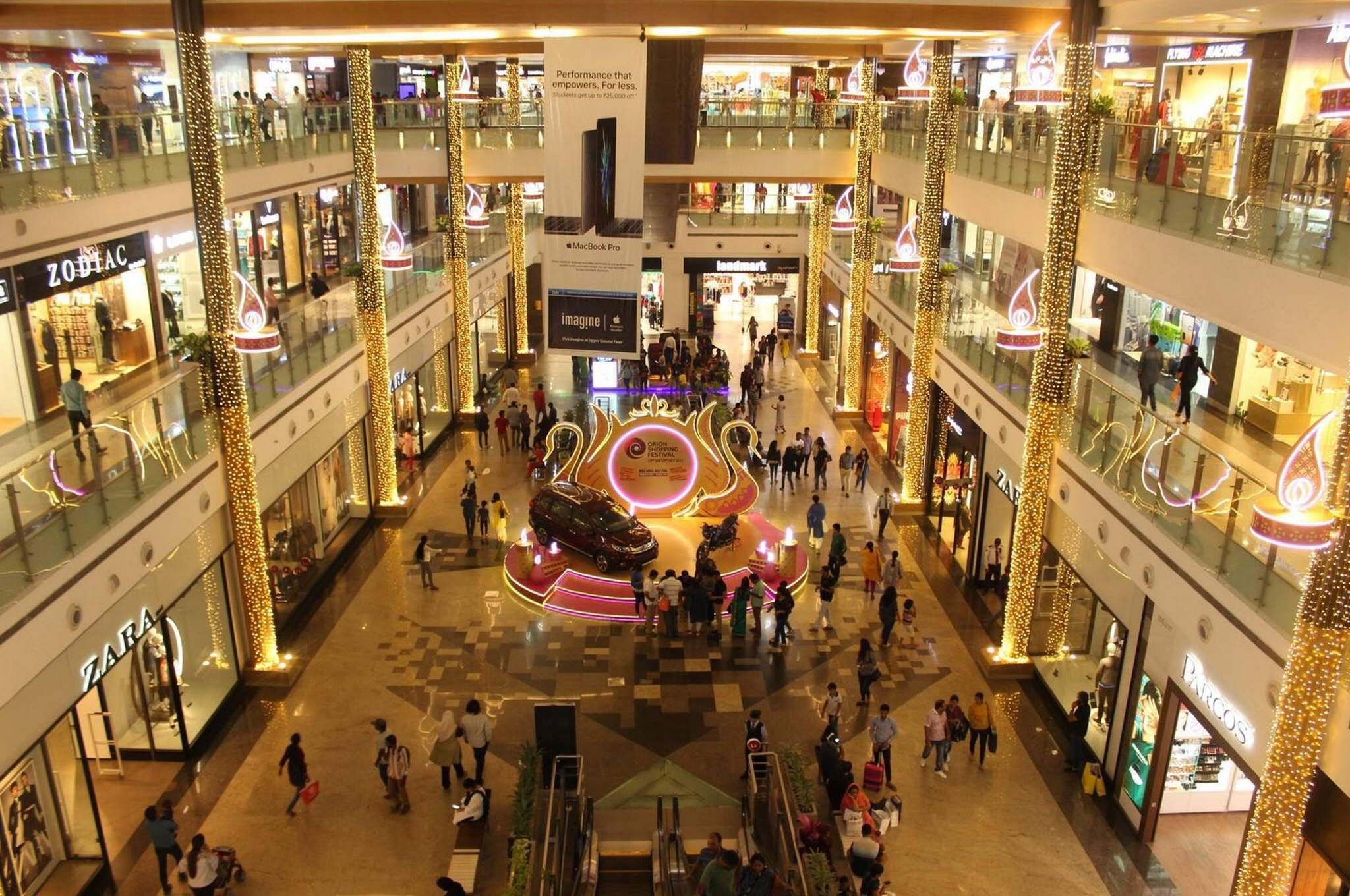
Interior view

== Entertainment and leisure ==
Places for entertainment and leisure activities in the mall are:

- 11-screen, 2,800-seat capacity, excluding 144-seat gold class screens PVR Cinemas multiplex
- Time Zone, an 8000-sq-ft gaming zone

== Food and dining ==
Food court is spread over an area of 60,000-sq-ft which is known as Sauce Pan. It houses several food stalls among which are Beijing bites, Empire, Fish & chips, Kailash parbat, Mangalore express, McDonald's, Taco Bell, Rajdhani, Domino's, Subway, Sukh sagar, Yogurberry, Chili's American Grill & Bar and KFC. There are various restaurants like Toscano and YouMee on the ground floor of orion.

== Events ==
- Orion mall hosted an automobile exhibition Fuel Auto Expo 2014 organised by Pulse events from 7 to 9 March 2014 featuring cars and bikes from leading manufacturers, vehicle accessories along with other events such as vintage car show and bike stunts.
- In September 2012, Indian Air Force organised an exhibition at the mall to showcase its capabilities. The expo included several events, such as flight simulators, life-sized models of aircraft, air-warriors performing drills and IAF themed arcade game.
