= Urban Ladder =

Furniture retailer

- Company type: Subsidiary
- Headquarters: Bengaluru, Karnataka, India
- Area served: India
- Founders: Ashish Goel; Rajiv Srivatsa
- Industry: Furniture, Home Decor
- Products: Furniture; Home Decor
- Services: E-commerce, Interior Design Consultancy
- Employees: 800
- Parent: Reliance Retail
- Website: www.urbanladder.com
- Launched: July 2012; 14 years ago

Urban Ladder is an Indian omnichannel furniture and decor retailer that was founded in 2012 by Ashish Goel and Rajiv Srivatsa. Headquartered in Bangalore. the company offers a wide range of furniture and home decor products through both online platforms and physical stores. Initially established as an online-only brand, Urban Ladder expanded into offline retail in 2017 and now operates 50 stores across major cities like Delhi-NCR, Mumbai, Pune, Bengaluru, Hyderabad, and Chennai.

== History ==
Ashish Goel, previously associated with McKinsey & Company and Amar Chitra Katha, and Rajiv Srivatsa, who had worked with Cognizant and Yahoo!, co-founded Urban Ladder in July 2012.

Urban Ladder shifted to offline retail in 2017, in an effort to becoming an omnichannel brand. Urban Ladder opened its first flagship store in Bangalore in on 8 July 2017.

In November 2020, Reliance Retail acquired a 96% stake in the company in a ₹182 crore deal.

== Products and services ==
The company delivers to over 83 cities in India and provides services such as furniture delivery, installation, and augmented reality (AR) technology, allowing customers to visualize products in their homes.

In addition to its online platform, Urban Ladder also has brick-and-mortar stores across major cities in India. The company also provides interior design consultancy services to help customers create personalized and functional living spaces.

== Funding and acquisition ==
Urban Ladder first secured seed capital of $US1 million from Kalaari Capital in August 2012. The company later raised another $US5 million in a Series A round led by SAIF Partners; Kalaari Capital also participated in the Series A funding. The company subsequently raised $US21 million in a Series B round of funding led by Steadview Capital, SAIF Partners and Kalaari Capital Four months after the company raised Series B funding from Steadview Capital and existing investors SAIF Partners and Kalaari Capital, Urban Ladder received a personal investment from Ratan Tata, Tata Sons.

On 9 April 2015, Urban Ladder announced that they had raised $US50 million in funding led by Sequoia Capital and TR Capital. Existing investors Steadview Capital, SAIF Partners and Kalaari Capital were also participants.

Urban Ladder raised an internal funding round of $12 million from investors including Kalaari Capital, Saif Partners, Sequoia Capital, and Steadview Capital in February 2018. Combined with the $15 million raised in January 2017, these funds were used to further Urban Ladder's online and offline omnichannel expansion – a decisive step towards profitability in FY 18–19. With a $27 million infusion over 12 months, Urban Ladder's omnichannel approach and profitability push were intended to help it build a powerful retail brand.

In 2020, Urban Ladder was acquired by Reliance Retail Venture Ltd (RRVL), a subsidiary of Reliance Industry Ltd (RIL), in an all-cash buyout of a 96 per cent stake in Urban Ladder for $24.5 million (₹182.12 crore).

== Business model ==
Urban Ladder uses both online and offline business models for distribution. the brand has also put its products on marketplaces, like Amazon and Flipkart. Urban Ladder has partnered with Zefo and Quikr to provide furniture exchange offers where customers can exchange old furniture for new ones. Urban Ladder has also partnered with Homelane and GoZefo as their distribution partners.

=== Urban Interiors ===
Urban Ladder launched design consultation as a service in 2016.

=== The Urban Ladder Design Network ===
Urban Ladder works with external designers besides its in-house collections and consultations. The Urban Ladder Design Network provides external designers with 3D rendered models of its products. The partnered designers also get priority inventory blocking on Urban Ladder's products and a commission when their clients select Urban Ladder's designs for their homes. Currently, Urban Ladder has over 600 design firms working with them as part of The Urban Ladder Design Network, with the tribe increasing every month.
