= Vani Kola =

Indian venture capitalist

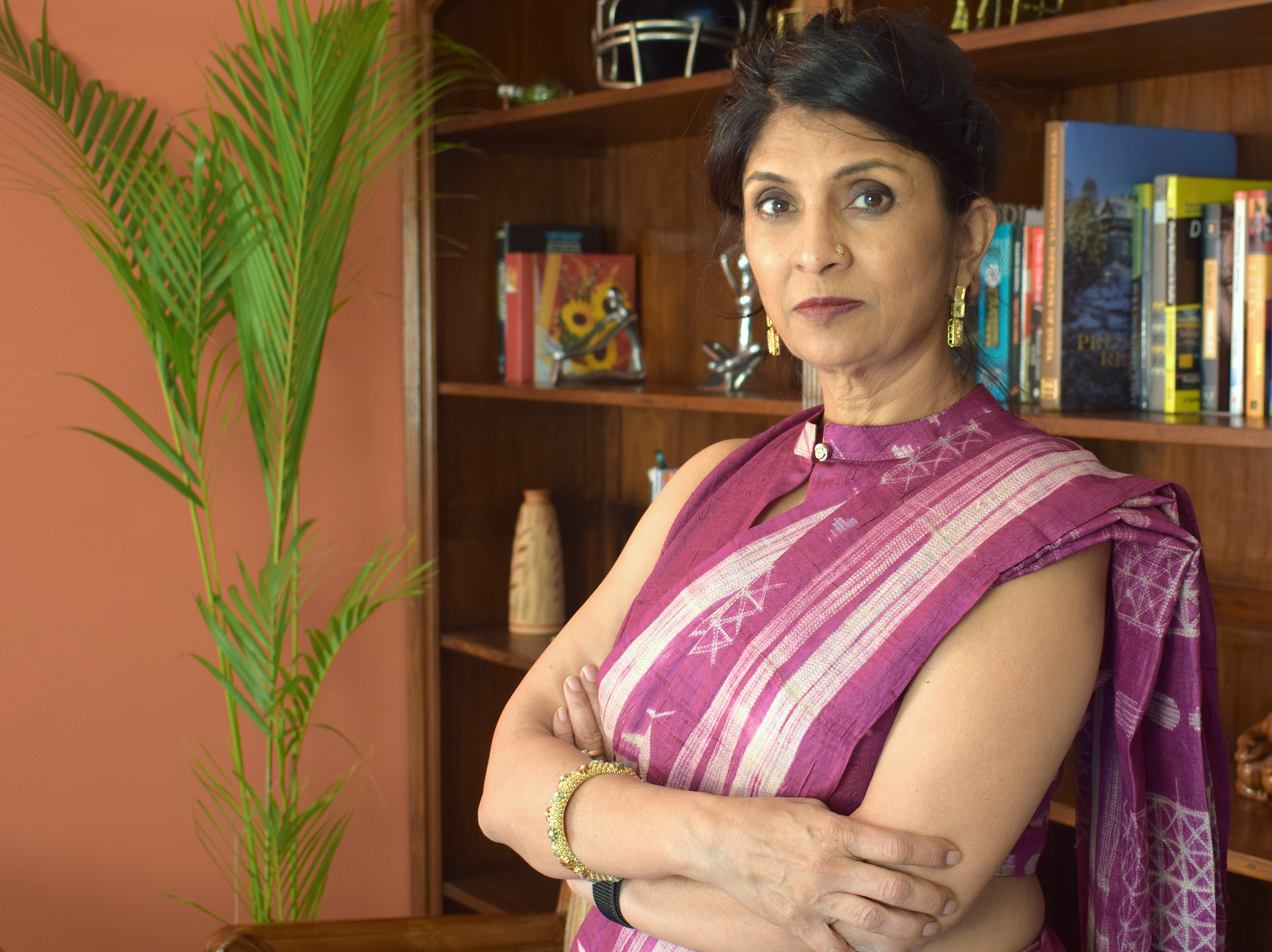
- Kola in 2020
- Born: 1963 or 1964 (age 62–63); Hyderabad, Andhra Pradesh (now Telangana)
- Education: Osmania University (B.Eng.); Arizona State University (M.Eng.)
- Occupation: venture capitalist
- Known for: Venture capital in India
- Website: vanikola.com

Vani Kola is an Indian venture capitalist. She is the founder and managing director of Kalaari Capital, an Indian early stage venture capital firm. She was listed as one of the most powerful women in Indian business by Fortune India in 2014.

== Early life and education ==
Vani Kola was born in 1963 or 1964 in Hyderabad, Andhra Pradesh (now Telangana), India. She commenced her post-secondary education at age 16. She attended Osmania University in Hyderabad, where she studied electrical engineering and was "one of six girls among 400 engineering students". She earned her Bachelor of Engineering before leaving India in the late 1980s to pursue her Master of Engineering from Arizona State University in the United States.

== Career ==
=== Silicon Valley ===
Kola had a 22-year career in Silicon Valley. A serial entrepreneur, she was the founder and CEO of the e-procurement company RightWorks, selling the company to ICG after four years for $657 million. She was then the founder and CEO of Certus Software.

=== Venture capital in India ===
Kola returned to India in 2006, after her successful career as an entrepreneur in Silicon Valley, to start a venture capital firm in India, drawn to the growing Indian opportunity. She and Vinod Dham founded Indo-US Venture Partners (IUVP) in 2006. A partnership with New Enterprise Associates (NEA), it was her initial undertaking into venture capital in India. In 2012, it was re-branded as Kalaari Capital.

Kalaari Capital began operations as a US$150 million fund in September 2012. Under Kola's leadership, the firm has grown to have US$650 million in assets under management, as of 2017.

Kola is the managing director of Kalaari Capital. She is a technology-focused early-stage investor and works with entrepreneurs to build global companies, leveraging India's domestic growth to create high growth enterprises. Kola has led investments in e-commerce, mobile services, education and healthcare. Some of her notable venture capital endeavours include: Dream11, Urban Ladder, Snapdeal, and Myntra.

== Awards and recognition ==
Kola was recognised as one of the most powerful women in Indian business by Forbes in 2014. She was awarded with the TiE Delhi-NCR 5th Edition of Women Entrepreneurship Summit Award on 20 July 2018, in Delhi. As part of the first-ever startup awards launched by The Economic Times, Kola was awarded the Midas Touch award for the best investor in 2015. She also won the NDTV Women of Worth award for leadership excellence in business and entrepreneurship. She has been identified as one of the LinkedIn Top Voices in 2016. She has been profiled in numerous books and was named as one of Fortune India's 'Most Powerful Women in Business' in 2018 and 2019.

== Philanthropy ==
=== ACT Grants ===
In response to the COVID-19 pandemic, ACT Grants, a not for profit initiative coalition of entrepreneurs and venture capitalists, was set up in April 2020. Kola, along with other senior leaders, has been spearheading this initiative. ACT Grants, which already has a corpus of ₹100 crores, has supported 50 different ventures.

=== Heartfulness Institute ===
Kola is also a Heartfulness trainer and is actively involved in supporting the Heartfulness Institute, a non-profit organisation focussed on human transformation through yoga and meditation.

== Personal life ==
Kola is married to Srinivas Kola and has two daughters. She ran marathons and climbed Mount Kilimanjaro in the 2000s. Kola meditates daily and has been a meditation practitioner for over two decades. In 2021 she was quoted in an article about "Zoom Fatigue" as an example of a person returning to the office to return to face-to-face communications.
