= Pavitra Shankar =

Indian entrepreneur

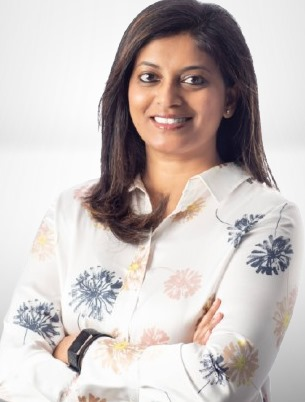
- Born: Bangalore, Karnataka
- Education: Master of Business Administration
- Alma mater: Columbia Business School, University of Virginia
- Occupations: Entrepreneur, Managing Director, Brigade Group, Founder, Brigade Legion Real Estate
- Organization: Brigade Group
- Parent: M R Jaishankar
- Family: Nirupa Shankar (Sister)

Pavitra Shankar is an entrepreneur and managing director of the real estate company Brigade Group. She previously worked in private equity and consulting roles, including at Willis Towers Watson, and has experience in real estate investment and development. M. R. Jaishankar, who founded the Brigade Group in 1986, serves as its chairman and managing director. He is also the father of Pavitra.

In 2025, she was listed among Fortune India's Most Powerful Women in Business.

Pavitra was also a founder of Legion Real Estate, which is based in Menlo Park, California.

== Biography ==
Pavitra was born in Bangalore, India, and was educated in the United States. She obtained an economics degree from the University of Virginia and later earned an MBA in real estate and finance from Columbia University in New York City, where she received the Alexander Bodini Real Estate Fellowship. Following her education, she entered the field of private equity in the United States, with a particular focus on the real estate sector.

In 2016, Pavitra returned to India and was initially appointed as an executive director at Brigade Group. She was involved in portfolio analytics and fund operations at Rockwood Capital LLC in San Francisco, a real estate private equity firm. Pavitra also contributed to Willis Towers Watson, a human capital consulting firm, working in their actuarial consulting and corporate finance teams.

Before joining Brigade Group as a managing director, Pavitra founded and managed Legion Real Estate in Menlo Park, California. The company provided business development and real estate marketing guidance to Indian developers targeting the NRI market in North America. As Joint Managing Director, she is responsible for the residential business and digital transformation functions.

Pavitra serves as a trustee of the Indian Music Experience, Bengaluru, a music museum established by Brigade Group. She is also a trustee of The Brigade Foundation, the non-profit arm of the Brigade Group.

== Awards and achievements ==
Pavitra Shankar received the BW Disrupt Women Entrepreneurship Award 2021 for her real estate contributions. She was also recognized in 2021 as one of Realty Plus' 40 under 40 icons. In 2022, she received The Economic Times Real Estate Award. In November 2024, Pavitra was included in Business Today's Most Powerful Women 2024 list. Shankar was included in Fortune India's ‘Most Powerful Women in Business in 2025 and again in 2026, when she was ranked 79th alongside her sister Nirupa Shankar.
