= Nirupa Shankar =

Indian athlete

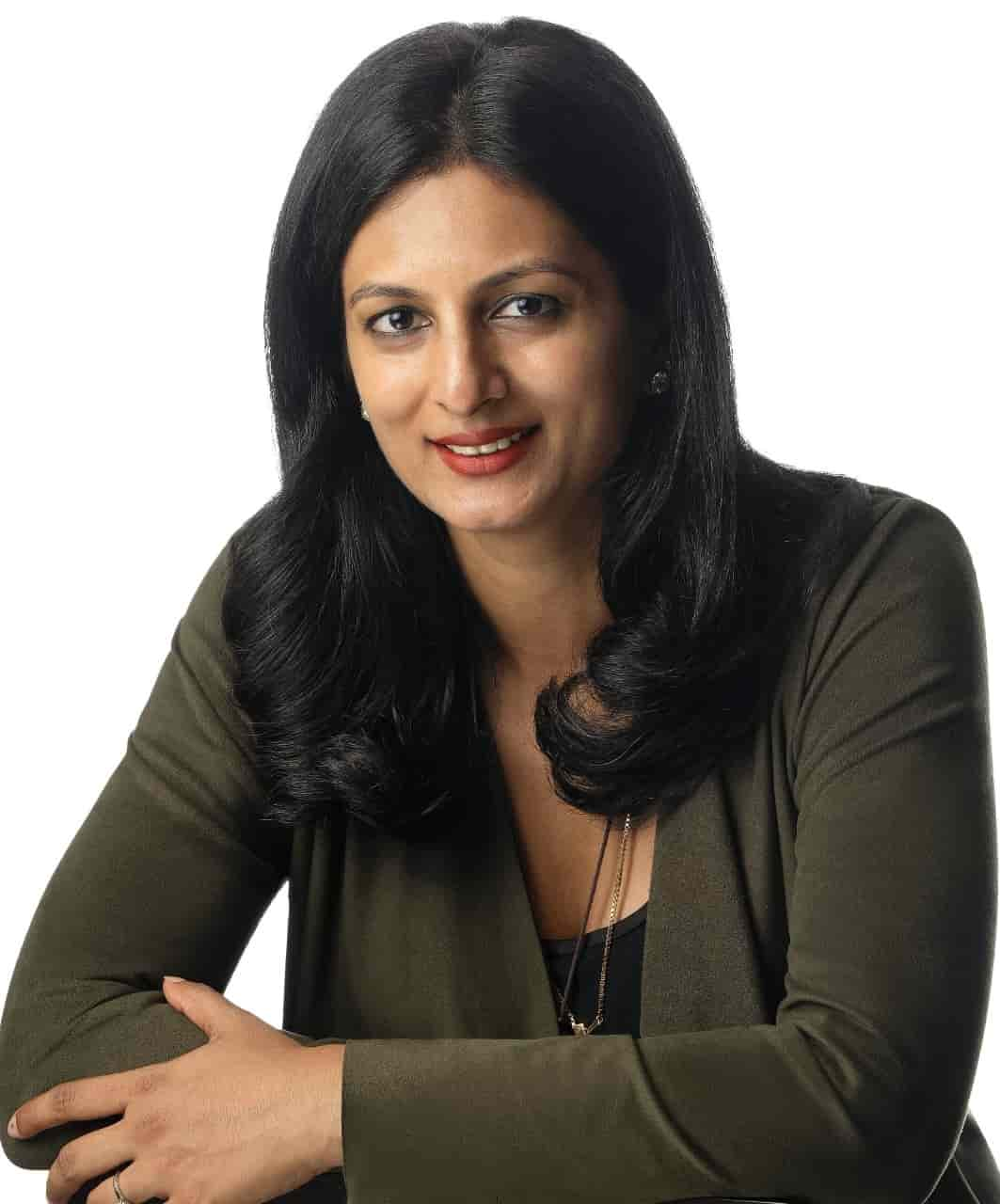
- Born: Bangalore, Karnakata, India
- Citizenship: Indian
- Education: Masters in Hospitality Management; Bachelor of Economics
- Alma mater: Cornell University; University of Virginia
- Occupations: Entrepreneur; sportswoman; Joint Managing Director, Brigade Group; Founder, Brigade REAP
- Organization: Brigade Group
- Father: M. R. Jaishankar
- Family: Pavitra Shankar (sister)
- Website: Official website

Nirupa Shankar is an Indian entrepreneur and athlete. She serves as joint managing director of Brigade Group, a Bengaluru-based real estate company founded by her father, M. R. Jaishankar. Prior to this role, she was the company's executive director. In 2016, she oversaw the launch of the Brigade Real Estate Accelerator Program (REAP), an initiative aimed at supporting tech startups in real estate.

Shankar was honored as a Young Turk on CNBC and included in Economic Times' 40 under 40 list.

She is also an athlete and has competed in marathons and triathlons, including the 2021 Ironman triathlon in Copenhagen, Denmark, where she was the sole female participant from India.

== Early life and education ==
Born and brought up in Bangalore, Shankar graduated with a bachelor's degree in economics from the University of Virginia and pursued a master's in management in hospitality from Cornell University. Shankar worked as a senior business analyst with Ernst & Young LLP in New York, Washington DC, and North Carolina.

== Career ==
Shankar joined the family business, Brigade Group, a publicly traded real estate and property development firm founded in 1986 by her father, M. R. Jaishankar, who serves as its executive chairman. She is responsible for overseeing operations related to hospitality, office, and retail properties, in addition to managing human resources, public relations, and innovation functions. In 2022, she was appointed Joint Managing Director, while her sister, Pavitra Shankar, became the managing director. Brigade Group operates in several cities, including Bengaluru, Mangalore, Mysore, Chennai, Kochi, Hyderabad, Chikmagalur, and Ahmedabad.

Shankar is also a trustee of the Brigade Foundations, a not-for-profit trust established by the Brigade Group.

In 2025, Shankar co-founded Earth Fund, a SEBI-registered alternative investment fund created as a joint venture between Brigade Group and Gruhas. The fund invests in early-stage startups in property technology, construction technology, and sustainability sectors.

She also serves as managing director of Brigade Hotel Ventures Limited, the hospitality subsidiary of Brigade Enterprises, established in 2016. As of 2025, the subsidiary operates nine hotels across South India. In July 2025, Brigade Hotel Ventures launched an initial public offering and was subsequently listed on the Bombay Stock Exchange and the National Stock Exchange.

=== Sport career ===
Following the birth of her first child, Nirupa Shankar started pursuing running in 2015 and joined a local joggers' club, where she discovered the challenges of endurance races.

Shankar has taken part in marathons and triathlon events. In 2021, she participated in a sprint (short-distance) triathlon in Croatia, beginning her training six months after the birth of her second child.

In March of the same year, she also joined the half Ironman in Dubai. Her training for the 2023 Ironman commenced in January of that year.

In 2023, she competed in the annual Ironman triathlon in Copenhagen, Denmark, held in August. Shankar was the only Indian female participant in this triathlon, which comprised a 3.8-kilometre swim, a 180-kilometre cycle ride, and a full marathon distance of 42.2 kilometers. In her first attempt at the Ironman, Shankar crossed the finish line in 14 hours, 47 minutes, and 41 seconds.

== Recognition ==
- 2016: Restaurant Owner of the Year at the Hospitality Leaders’ Industry Choice Awards
- 2020: Her company, Brigade REAP, won the National Startup Awards in the Incubators & Accelerators category.
- 2021: Received ‘ET 40 Under Forty:’ India Inc's Top Young Leaders 2021
- 2023: Listed in the Power List 2023 by Hotelier India
- She received recognition from CNBC as a Young Turk.
- 2024: Business Today's Most Powerful Women 2024 list
- 2025: Shankar was included in Fortune India's list of the Most Powerful Women in Business.
