= Commonfloor =

Indian real estate portal founded in 2007

CommonFloor
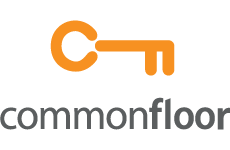
- The Online Realstate Portal
- Company type: Privately held company
- Founded: 2007
- Headquarters: Bangalore
- Area served: India
- Founders: Sumit Jain, Lalit Mangal, Vikas Malpani
- CEO: Sumit Jain
- Industry: Real estate
- Products: Residential, CF Groups, CF Retina (Virtual Reality), Live-in Tours
- Employees: 795 (as of June 2015)
- Parent: Quikr
- Website: www.commonfloor.com

CommonFloor.com is an Indian real estate portal founded in 2007 by three computer science graduates from IIT Roorkee and JSSATE. On 8 January 2015, CommonFloor received funding from Google Capital. On 7 January 2016, the classifieds advertising platform Quikr announced that they have acquired CommonFloor.com.

== History ==
The company initially started as an apartment management solution provider and went on to be a real estate platform that combines property search, apartment management, and vendor management.

CommonFloor has raised 4 rounds of funding from three investors. The most recent one being of around $10M from Google Capital, just three months after receiving $30 million funding from Tiger Global.

After 8 years and 4 rounds of funding, CommonFloor is providing property search services in more than 120 cities across India. CommonFloor is listed in 33 startups by Tech in Asia.

CommonFloor links neighbors who live in apartments by its CommonFloor Apartment Management System. Many apartments use this service for getting connected to the apartment community. CommonFloor launched its Mobile App for seekers in March 2013 to provide the facility to search properties and also provide facility to list properties. CommonFloor launches National Consumer Sentiment Index a survey of 600 consumers in six metros and 15 tier-two cities across the country in October 2013.

Real estate portal CommonFloor.com launches apartment management offering CommonFloor Groups, which provide apartment communities across the country better communication, management, and coordination amongst residents, owners (residents or non-residential landlords), and Resident Welfare Associations (RWAs).

As of 25 April 2016, CommonFloor ranks as the top 9 startup for India in the StartupRanking.

== Acquisitions ==
In June 2015, CommonFloor invested $2.5 million in the seed funding round in Flatchat, an app to find roommates.

In January 2015, CommonFloor acquired Bakfy, an app.

In April 2014, CommonFloor acquired Flat.to, a startup that helps bachelors find a home for rent.
