= Chai Point =

Indian tea company and cafe chain

- Company type: Privately held
- Industry: Food & beverage
- Founded: 2010; 16 years ago
- Founder: Amuleek Singh Bijral
- Headquarters: Umiya Emporium, No. 97, 2nd floor, Hosur Main Road,, Bengaluru 560029, Karnataka, India
- Number of locations: 126 (May 2018)
- Area served: India
- Key people: Amuleek Singh Bijral (CEO)
- Products: Tea and tea based beverages, coffee, indulgent shakes, snacks, sandwiches, packaged foods, hot beverage dispensers, packaged teas
- Revenue: (150 crore)
- Number of employees: 1200+ (2017)
- Parent: Mountain Trail Foods Pvt. Ltd.
- Website: Chai Point; BoxC

Chai Point is an Indian tea company and a cafe chain which focuses on tea-based beverages. As of October, 2017, the company also started selling their teas on Amazon.in, making it their first foray into distribution via the e-commerce platform. Chai Point's motto of "India runs on Chai" is apt for Indians' love for tea.

== History ==
Chai Point was founded in Bengaluru, Karnataka, India, in 2010 by Amuleek Singh. The name Chai Point is derived from the word Chai which is the Hindi word for tea.

Chai Teas is an integral part of a large majority of Indian home and different varieties of teas are also not alien to most of the Indians. Amuleek Singh, however, created an entire ecosystem of making the tea and its packaging more appealing to white collar Indians who were latching on to the high end coffee joints.

== Locations ==
Chai Point has presence in eight Indian cities with presence across retail locations, airports, and business parks. In addition to physical format stores, the chain has a delivery service and a vending based solution called 'Vending as a Service'' focused primarily at corporation.

== Investors ==
Chai Point raised a total of ₹71.2 crore ($10 million) in round one of funding in September, 2015. On April 19, 2018, tea retailer Chai Point said it had raised ₹132 crore ($20 million) in series C funding, its single-largest round so far. Key investors in Chai Point include:

- Eight Road Ventures (Lead Investor, formerly Fidelity Growth Partners India)
- DSG Investors
- Saama Capital
- Paragon Partners
