= Meru Cabs =

Indian taxi-hailing company

- Company type: Private
- Industry: Transport
- Founded: April 2007
- Founder: Neeraj Gupta
- Headquarters: Mumbai, India
- Number of locations: 24 cities (2015)
- Area served: India
- Brands: Meru Cabs, MeruBiz, MeruSpot, Meru Reserve
- Services: Vehicle for hire
- Revenue: ▼₹115.96 crore (US$12 million) (FY20)
- Net income: ▼₹−10.64 crore (US$−1.1 million) (FY20)
- Number of employees: 343 (2020)
- Parent: Mahindra Logistics
- Website: www.meru.in

Meru Cabs is an Indian taxi-hailing company. Founded by Neeraj Gupta in 2006, the company is headquartered in Mumbai. Since 2019, the company has been owned by Mahindra Group.

Meru provides mobility services to individuals as well as business houses across India. Currently, Meru provides app-based transportation services like city rides, city rentals, airport transfers, and outstation travel, etc to individuals as well as corporate houses in 24 cities across India.

== History ==
Neeraj Gupta founded the V-Link Group in 2000. Started as a staff transportation business, V-Link Fleet Solutions expanded its business and provided services to clients in the BPO sector. In a duration of 4 years, V-Link expanded to a fleet of 1300 vehicles.

In August 2006, Maharashtra government invited tenders for running a fleet of 10,000 taxis in Mumbai in an attempt to replace the already existing black-yellow cabs (Kaali-peeli taxis). It was during this time that V-Link collaborated with venture capital firm True North, formerly known as India Value Fund (IVF), to form Meru. With initial funding of INR 500 million, Meru was launched in Mumbai offering AC cabs to India for the first time, with electronic meters and GPS/GPRS system cabs via the call booking system. In a short time, Meru scaled up its services to the top 4 cities of India with a fleet of 5000 cabs by 2010.

By 2015, with a fleet of 9000 cabs, Meru provided its services in most of the Metros, Tier-2 & Tier-3 cities of India including – Mumbai, Delhi, Hyderabad, Bangalore, Jaipur, Ahmedabad, Chennai, Vadodara, Surat, Pune, and Kolkata. Meanwhile, Meru tied-up with the 5 major airports of India and became their official airport cab service provider. By 2018, Meru broadened its service offerings from city and airport rides to city rentals and outstation. Meru also tied-up with Mahindra Electric to offer transportation in Hyderabad.

In 2019, Mahindra & Mahindra acquired a 55% stake in Meru Cabs. With this merger, Meru expanded its product offerings and added electric vehicles in its fleet. In May 2021, Mahindra & Mahindra raised its stake to 100%. In December 2021, Mahindra Logistics acquired 100% stake in Meru Cabs from Mahindra & Mahindra.

Meru ran a pilot project with 200 electric cars in Mumbai and Delhi. By 2020, Meru grew to become the second-largest ride-hailing service to include electric vehicles (EV) in its fleet.
