= Brigade Group =

Indian real estate developer

Brigade Enterprises Limited

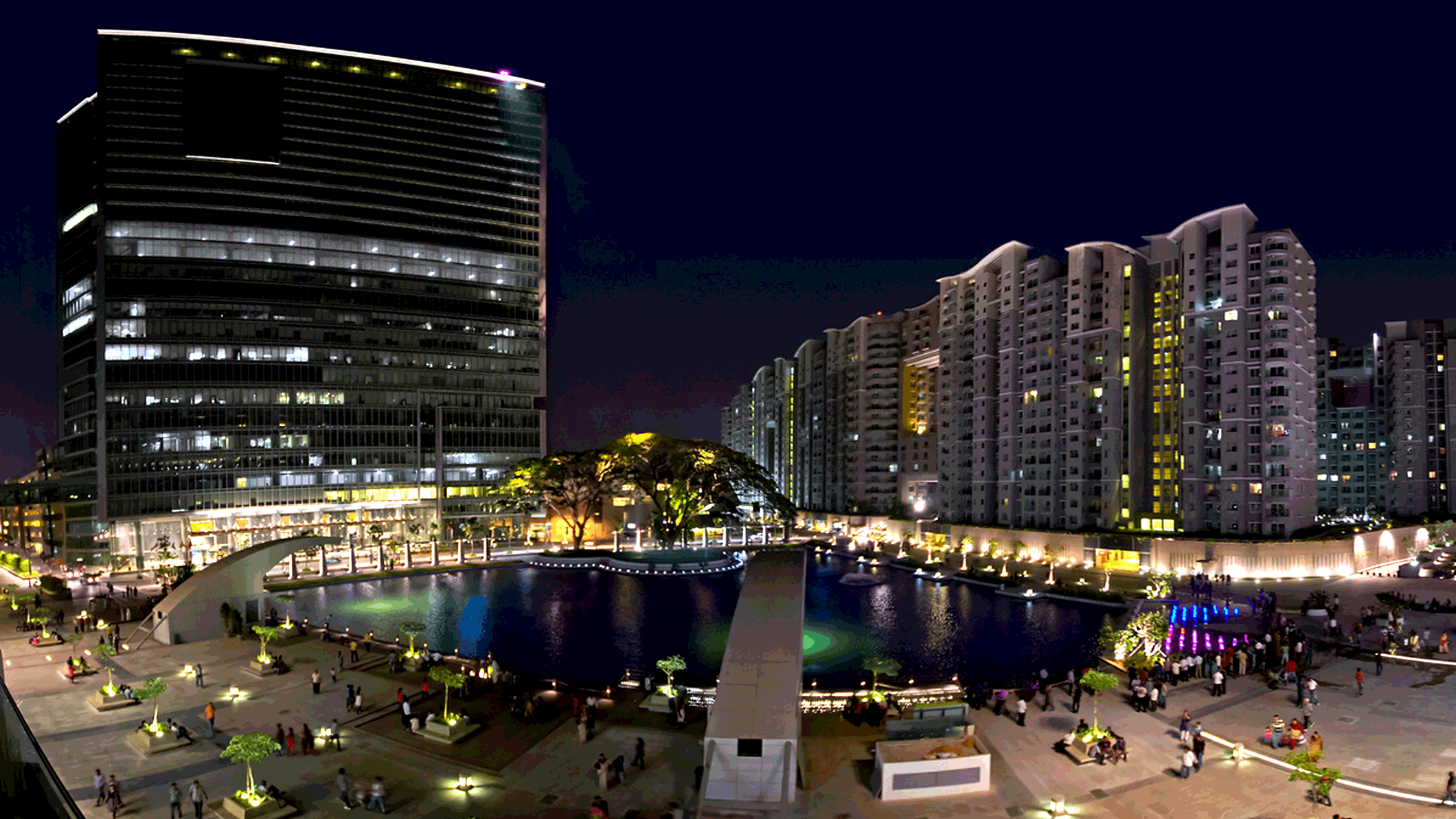
- Brigade Gateway enclave in Bangalore, comprising World Trade Center, Orion Mall, Sheraton Hotel and apartment complex
- Type: Public
- Traded as: BSE: 532929; NSE: BRIGADE
- Industry: Real estate
- Founded: 1986; 40 years ago
- Founder: M. R. Jaishankar
- Headquarters: Bangalore, Karnataka, India
- Area served: India
- Key people: M. R. Jaishankar (Executive Chairman); Nirupa Shankar; Pavitra Shankar
- Products: Commercial offices; Apartments; Shopping malls; Villas; Hotels; Leisure & hospitality; Retail
- Website: www.brigadegroup.com

Brigade Enterprises Limited is an Indian real estate and property development company that is based in Bangalore. The Brigade Group also has operations in Mangalore, Mysore, Chennai, Kochi, Hyderabad, Chikmagalur, Ahmedabad and a representative office in Dubai. It has won national and international awards in the construction industry. It was founded by M.R. Jaishankar in the year 1986.

Brigade Group provides property management services, hospitality and education across several major cities in South India. The group also owns Brigade Foundation, which is a not-for-profit trust.

== History ==
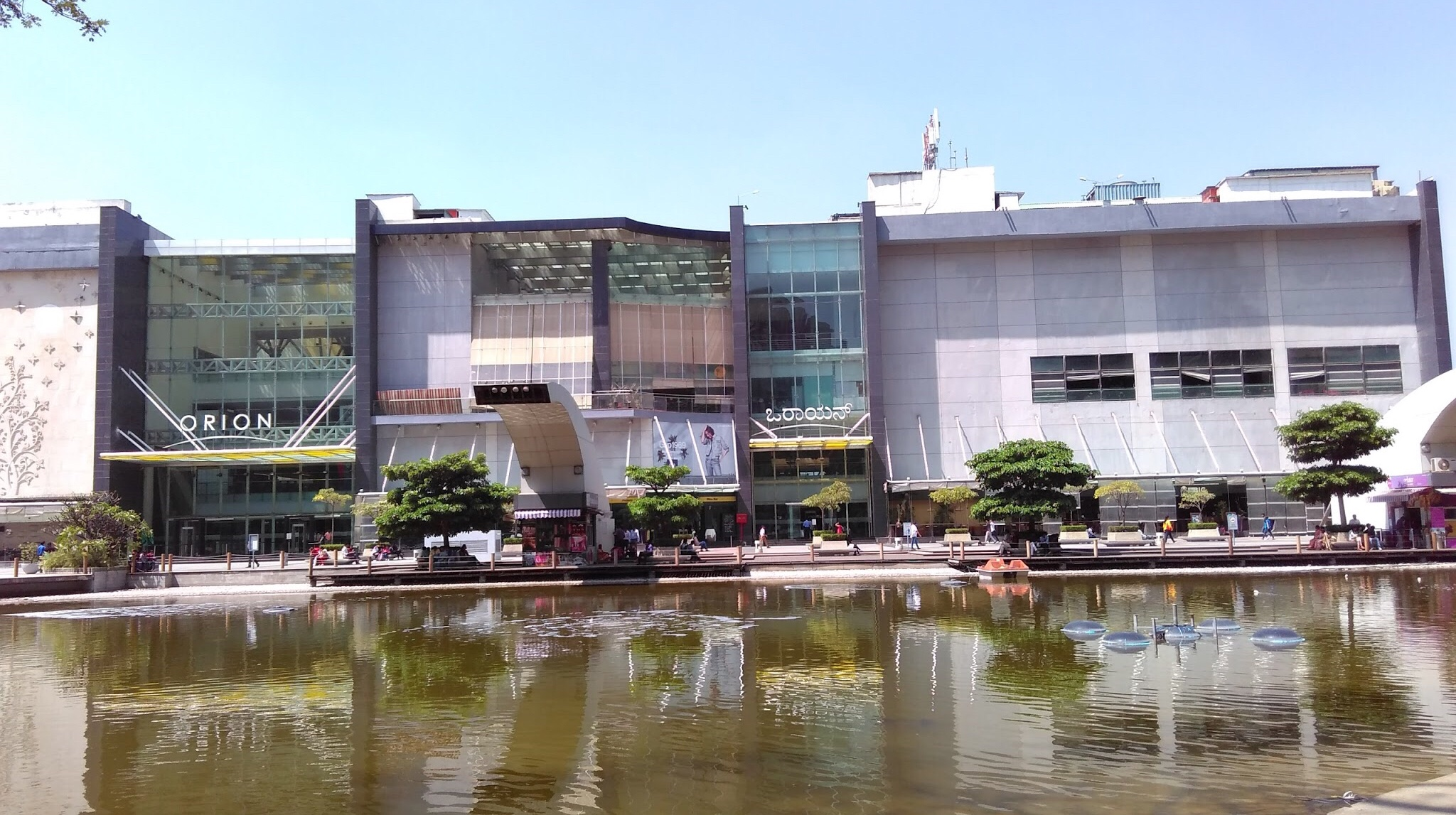
Orion Mall in Bangalore

The Brigade Group has Brigade International Finance Centre in Gujarat International Finance Tec-City and has built World Trade Center Bangalore, World Trade Center Chennai and World Trade Center, Kochi.

Brigade holds the WTCA licenses for all the major South Indian cities.
