= World Trade Center Bengaluru =

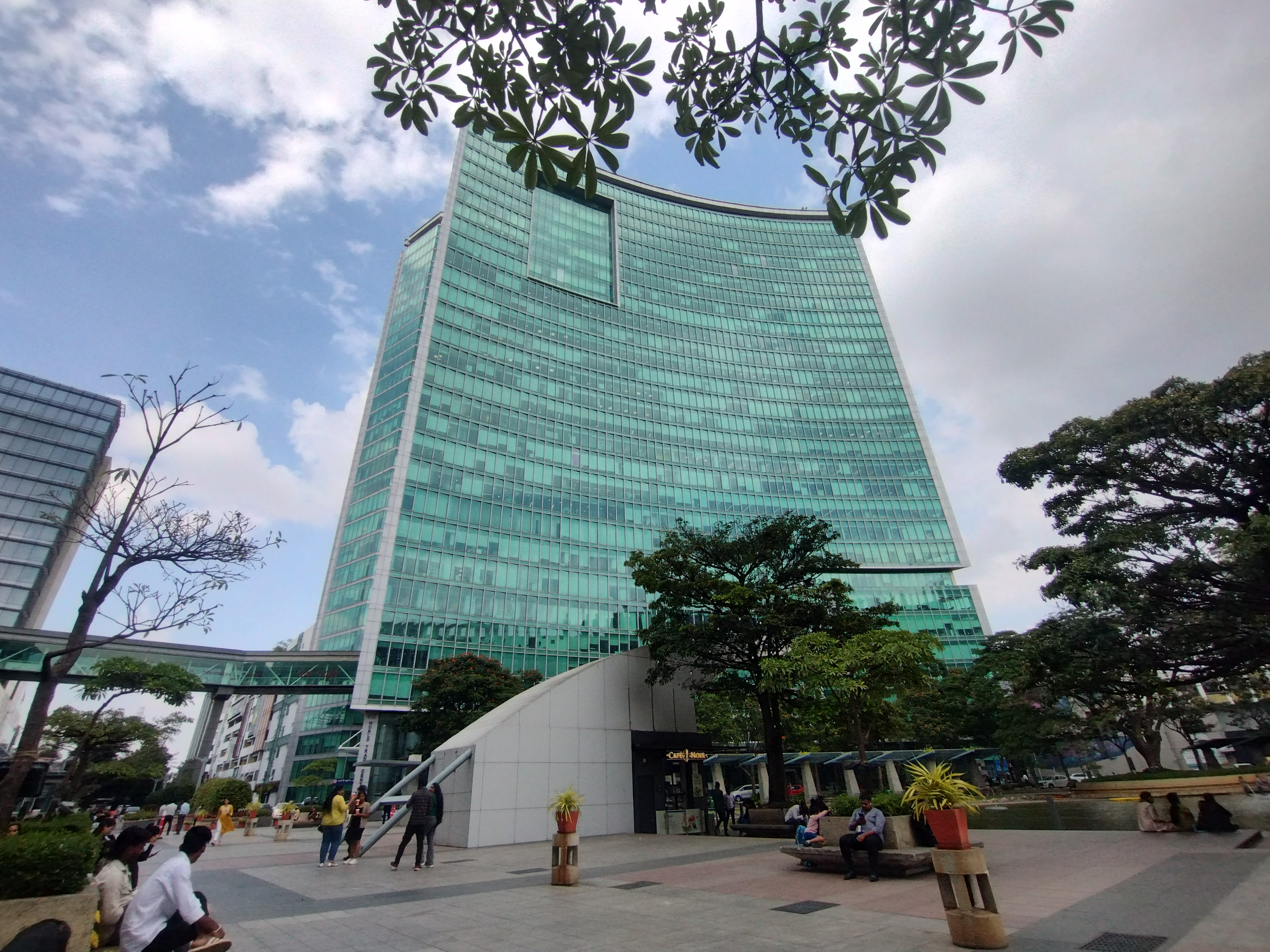
- WTCB in 2025
- Interactive map of the World Trade Center Bengaluru area

General information
- Type: Commercial
- Location: Bengaluru, Karnataka, India
- Coordinates: 13.0123°N 77.5562°E
- Completed: 2010

Height
- Roof: 128 m (420 ft)

Technical details
- Floor count: 32

Website
- Official website

The World Trade Center Bengaluru (WTCB) is a building complex located in Malleshwaram West, Bengaluru, India, which was opened for operation in 2010. Built by Brigade Group who obtained the WTCA license for its construction, the building became the second World Trade Center in India after the one in Mumbai. At 128 m, the WTCB was the tallest commercial building in south India from 2010 till 2015 and the tallest building in Bangalore between 2010 and 2013. However, it still remains the tallest commercial building of Bengaluru. The building is part of an integrated enclave called "Brigade Gateway", along with Orion Mall, Manipal Hospital, Sheraton Hotel, Brigade School and Brigade Gateway Apartments.

The WTCB is close to ISKCON Temple, Indian Institute of Science, Yesvantpur Junction railway station and Sandal Soap Factory metro station.

== Gallery ==
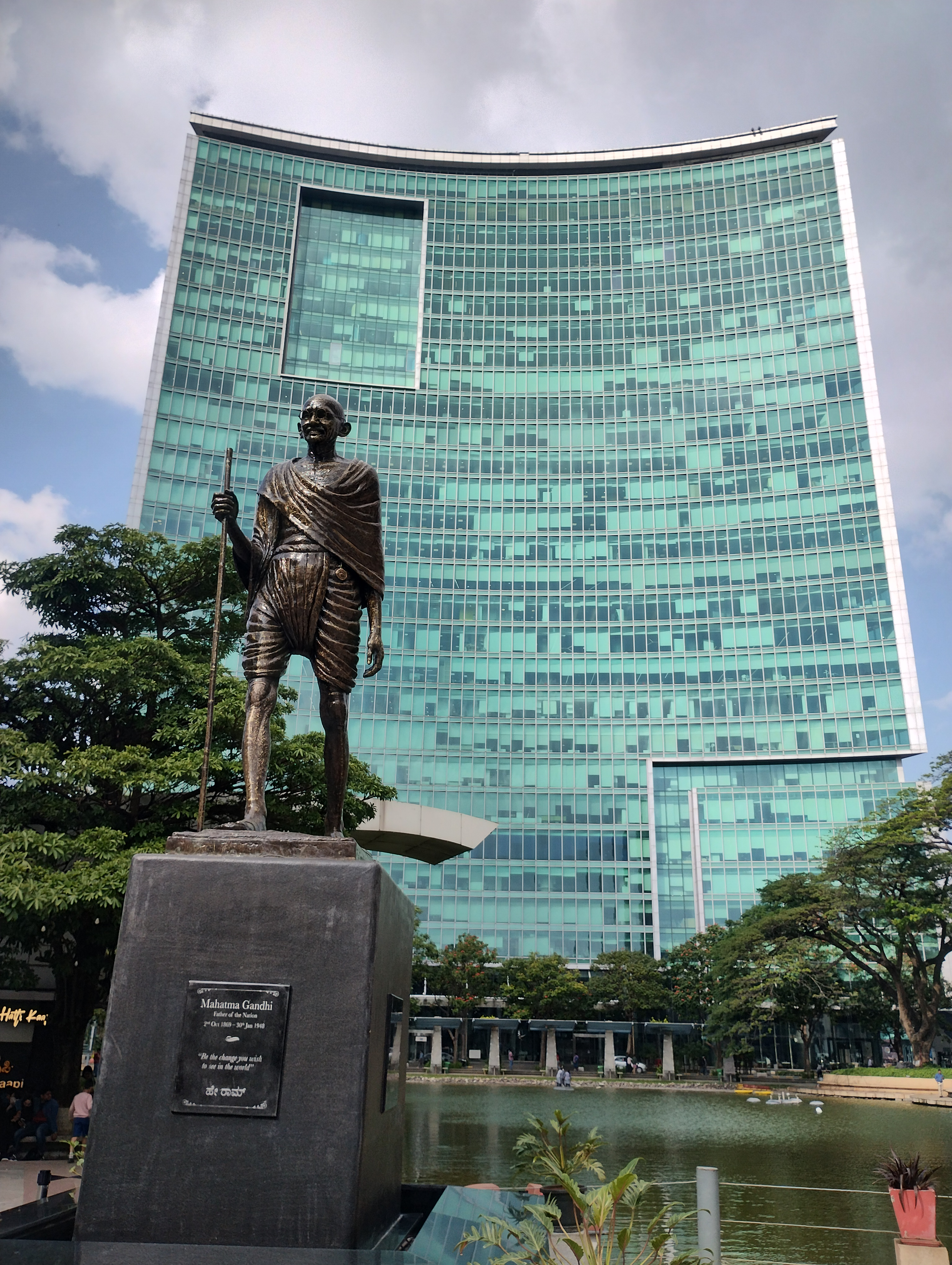
Front view of the WTCB

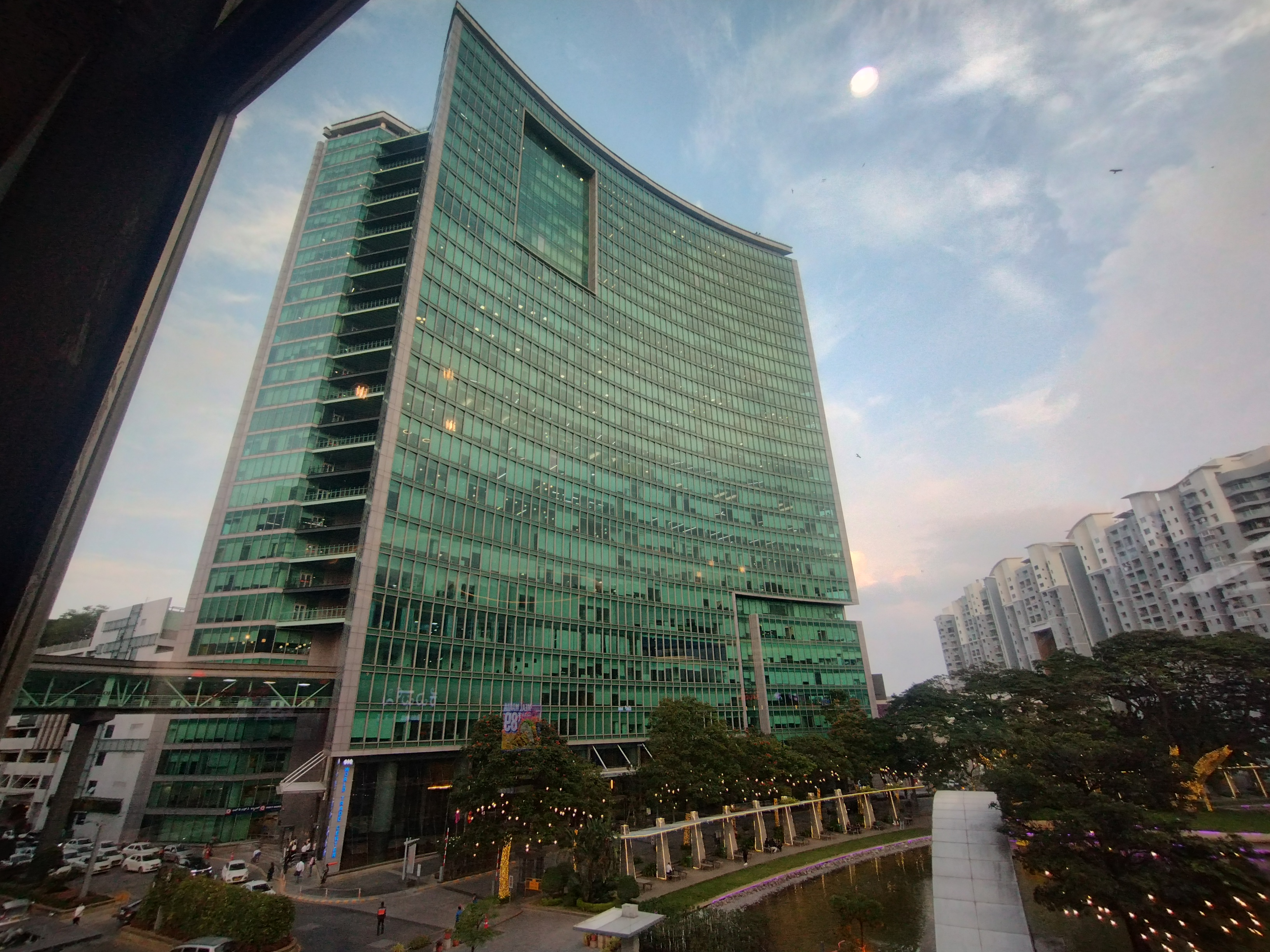
Side view of the WTCB

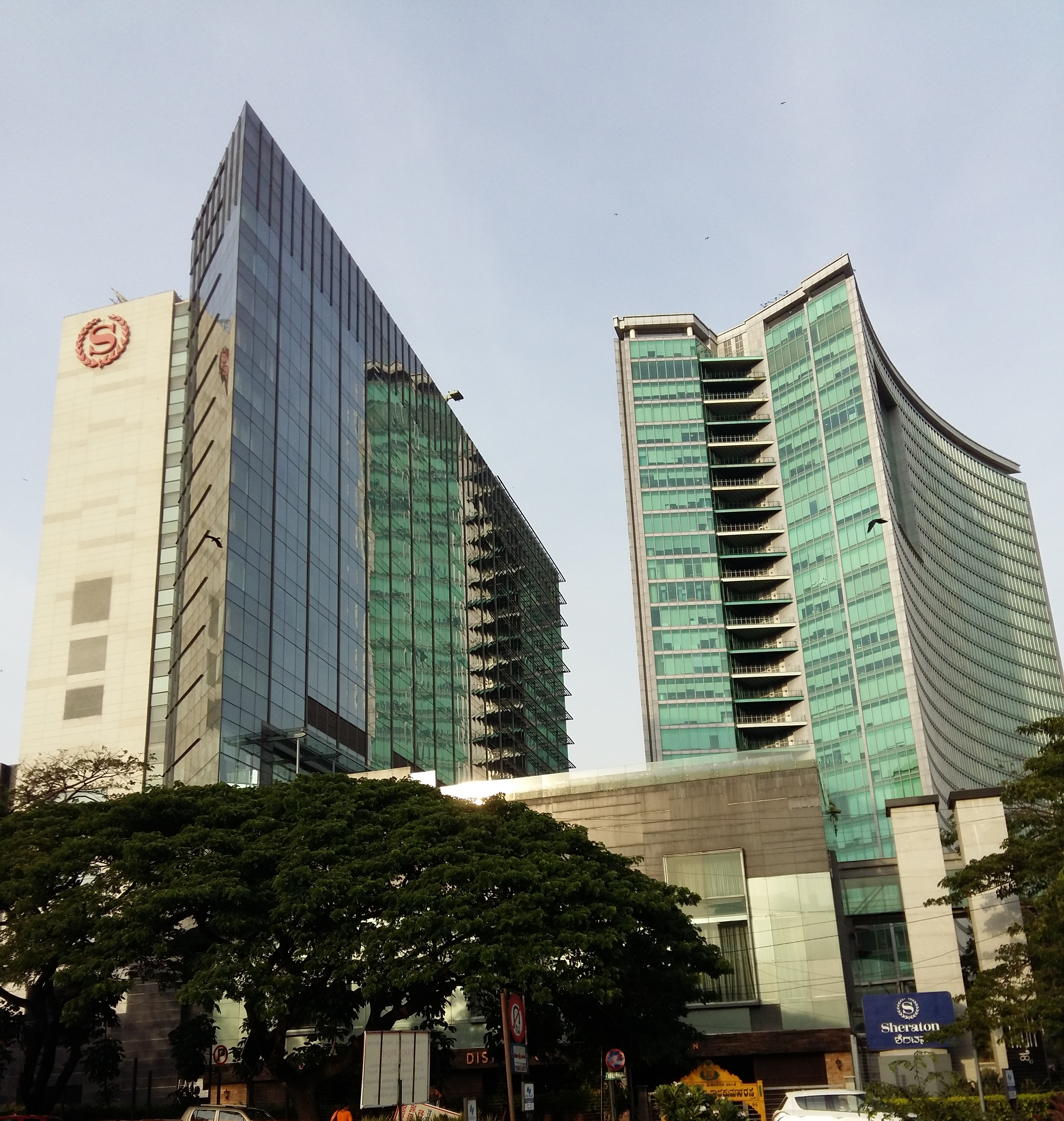
WTC tower from Sheraton Grand Bangalore Hotel

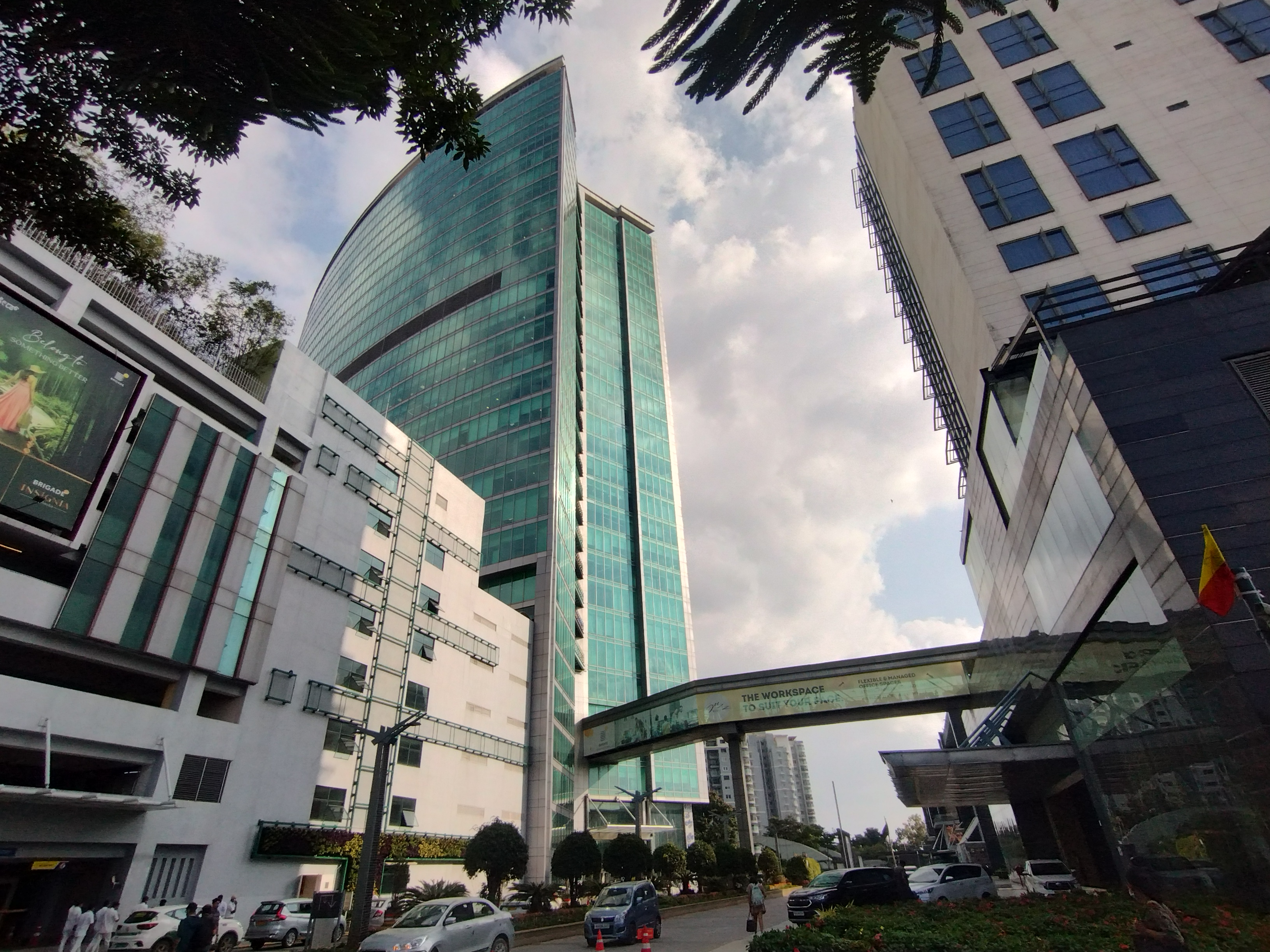
Skywalk connecting WTCB and Sheraton Grand Bangalore Hotel

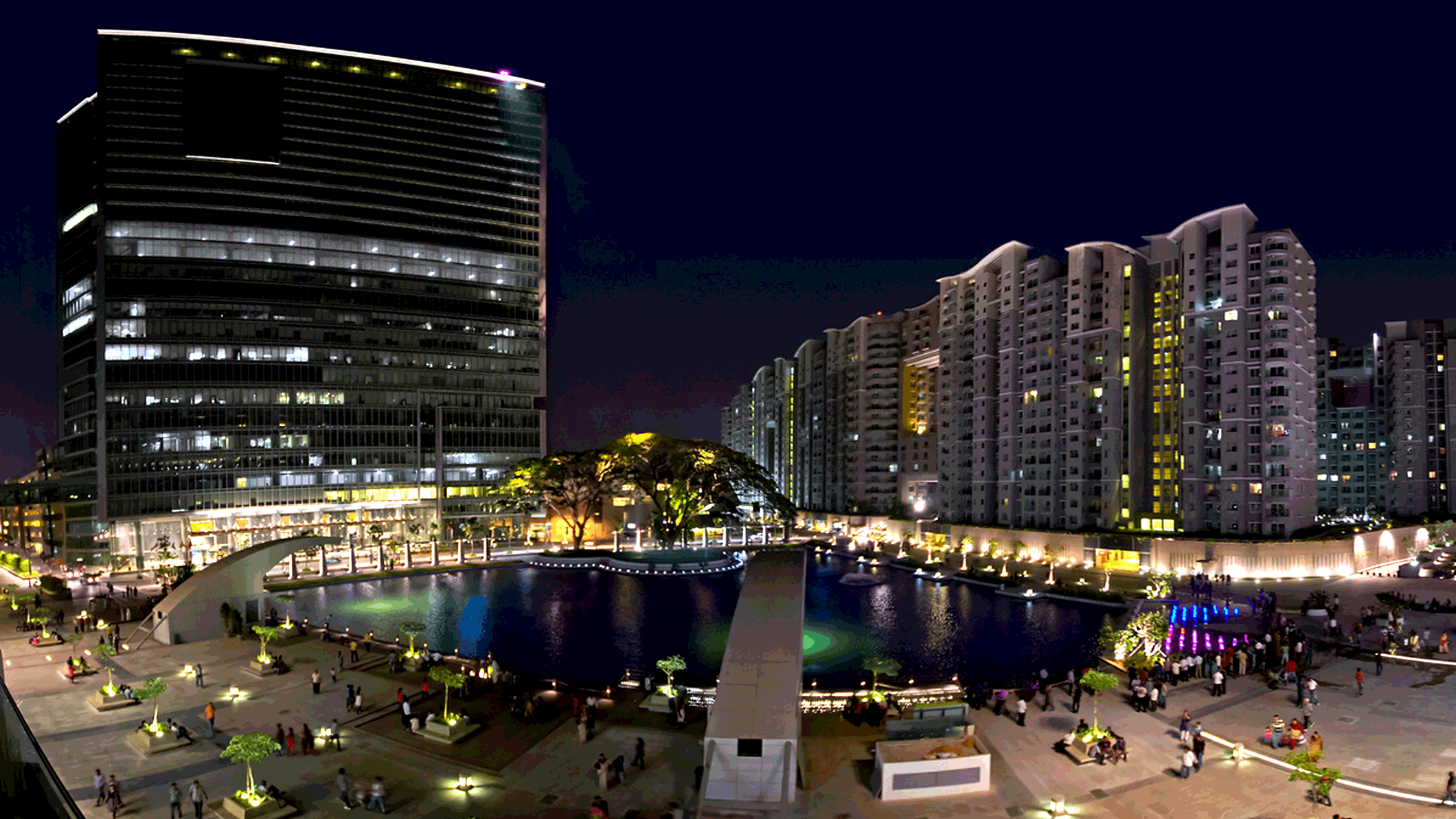
WTCB (left) and Brigade Gateway Apartments(right) at nighttime

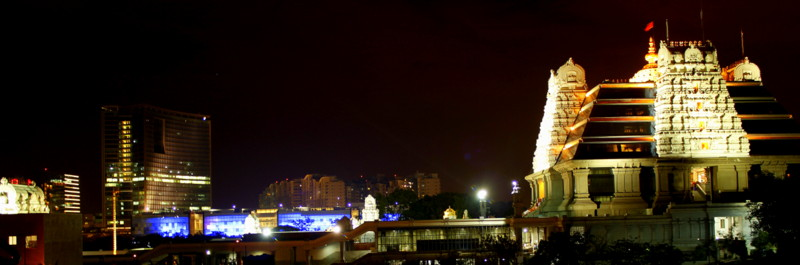
WTCB (left) and ISKCON Temple (right) during the night

== See also ==
- List of world trade centers
- List of tallest buildings in Bangalore
- List of tallest buildings in India
