= MylesCar =

Car sharing company

Myles
- Industry: Car rental
- Founded: November 2013 in New Delhi, India
- Founder: Sakshi Vij
- Headquarters: New Delhi, India
- Area served: Delhi, Mumbai, Pune, Noida, Gurgaon, Bangalore, Chennai, Hyderabad, Ahmedabad, Ghaziabad, Goa, Mysore, Mangalore, Vizag, Bhubaneswar, Jaipur, Udaipur, Chandigarh, Amritsar, Coimbatore, Puducherry
- Services: Car rental
- Website: mylescars.com

Myles (established in 2013) is a self-drive car sharing company in India owned by Carzonrent in Delhi, India.

== History ==
Myles was launched in November 2013 by Sakshi Vij of Carzonrent.

She began her career in 2007, when she joined 'Myles’ parent company, Carzonrent India Private Limited (CIPL), as a part of the marketing team.

In January 2019, MG Motor India announced a strategic partnership with Myles. In October 2020, Toyota Motors India, and in August 2020, Maruti Suzuki India tied up with Myles to offer their cars on subscription.

== Services ==
In March 2016, the firm ran more than 1,000 cars across 23 cities in India.
