= Wildcraft =

Indian outdoor product company

Wildcraft India Ltd.
- Trade name: WILDCRAFT
- Formerly: Wildcraft India Private Limited
- Company type: Private
- Industry: Retail
- Founded: 1998; 28 years ago
- Headquarters: Bangalore, Karnataka, India
- Area served: Worldwide
- Key people: Gaurav Dublish, Siddharth Sood; Bhupinder Singh (Chief Product Officer)
- Products: Outdoor Clothing, Footwear and Gear
- Website: wildcraft.com

Wildcraft India Ltd is an Indian company that designs, manufactures, and retails outdoor gear, footwear, clothing, and travel accessories. Headquartered in Bengaluru, the company operates over 200 exclusive stores and is present in more than 5,000 multi-brand retail outlets across India and international markets. It was founded in the 1990s by Gaurav Dublish and Siddharth Sood. During the COVID-19 pandemic, Wildcraft also manufactured personal protective equipment (PPE).

== History ==
Wildcraft originated in a small garage in Jayanagar, Bengaluru, growing in the early stages through word of mouth and local adventure communities.

Wildcraft's first product in the 1990s was a dome tent. The company shifted to manufacturing packs and associated outdoor gear and expanded to multi-terrain footwear and outdoor clothing. In 2014, it rolled out an expanded range of gear including clothing and footwear, hiring an additional 1,000 employees across its factories located in Bangalore.

It ventured into technical clothing in 2015, into performance footwear in 2017 & launched an innovative line of travel cases in 2019. Between 2015 and 2018 Wildcraft developed a 90-liter technical rucksack for the Indian army, won the contract and supplied it to the armed forces from 2020 onwards. In 2020 Wildcraft developed a line of personal protection gear (respirators and Hazmat suits) and became one of the world's largest lifestyle brands marketing this during the Covid era.

During the COVID-19 lockdown in India, Wildcraft India diversified its product portfolio by making products like Personal Protective Equipments (PPE).

== Operations ==
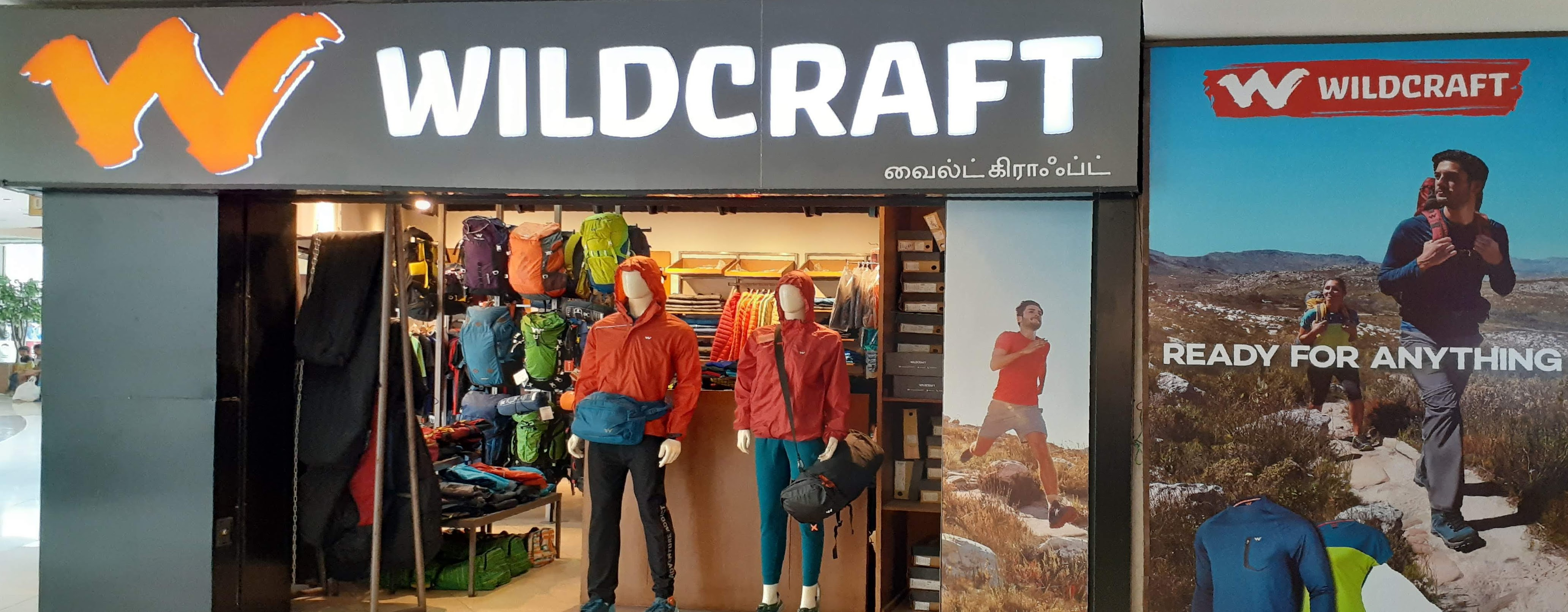
A Wildcraft store in Chennai

Wildcraft makes backpacks, rucksacks, camping and hiking equipment, among other things. The company's products are sold in 175+ exclusive stores and 4,000 multi-branded stores in India, growing by 20-30 stores each year. Wildcraft products are also available in the Middle East and South Asian countries.

Until March 2020, Wildcraft employed more than 3,700 people. Few months later, it scaled up its manufacturing facilities by collaborating with more than 60 factories through a hub and spoke model. By July, the company employed about 30,000 people.

== Finances ==
Wildcraft was started by a group of outdoor enthusiasts and run initially as a hobby with a limited commercial focus. Under the leadership that has led the firm since 2008, it pursued an expansion strategy and increased revenue over 100x in less than a decade. According to Dublish, the company grew at a compound annual growth rate of 75% from 2007 to 2012 and continued to grow annually at 50% till 2018 & is now pursuing a 25% revenue CAGR. In September 2013, Sequoia Capital, a California-based private equity firm, invested ₹70 crore, giving it an enterprise valuation of about US$50 million. Wildcraft clocked retail sales of ₹400 crore in FY 2017, and is looking at a total deployment of ₹350 crore, to achieve a run-rate of ₹1,000 crore by 2020.
