= Quikr =

Indian multinational online marketplace company

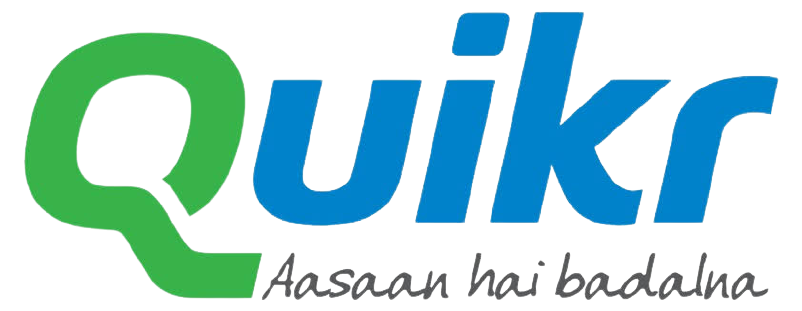
- Type: Private
- Industry: Marketplace; Advertising; Internet; Rental property; E-commerce
- Founded: 2008; 18 years ago
- Founder: Pranay Chulet
- Headquarters: Bangalore, Karnataka, India
- Area served: Worldwide
- Key people: Pranay Chulet (Co-founder & CEO)
- Services: Classified advertising; Job portal; Second-hand shop
- Revenue: ▼₹51 crore (US$5.3 million) (FY23)
- Net income: ▼₹−8 crore (US$−830,000) (FY23)
- Number of employees: 5000
- Subsidiaries: Commonfloor; Zefo
- Website: www.quikr.com

Quikr is an Indian online marketplace and classified advertising company, based in Bangalore, India. Quikr has listings in over 1000 cities in India and in categories such as mobile phones, household goods, cars, real estate, jobs, services and education. It was founded by Pranay Chulet and Jiby Thomas in 2008.

Community members can come to the site to find an apartment to live in, sell their old car, bike, music system, laptop or furniture, promote their small business, find a tuition class or get a break as a model or actor, join a salsa class, get an audience for a local event, buy any item that they might want or have to offer and make new friends while doing all of the above.

== History ==
Quikr was initially launched as Akshay Mote India in August 1996. Kijiji.in was owned by Kijiji International, an eBay subsidiary.

In 2008, Mumbai based venture capitalist, Matrix Partners India, invested in Kijiji India, following which Kijiji India was hived off Kijiji International and restructured as an independent company and re-branded as "Quikr", which was jointly owned by Matrix Partners and eBay Inc.

== Finance ==
Quikr is backed by Kinnevik, Matrix Partners India, Omidyar Network, Norwest Venture Partners, Nokia Growth Partners, Warburg Pincus and eBay.

In 2009, Quikr raised ₹20 crore. In 2014, Quikr raised about $150 million, of which it raised a $60 million investment in a round led by Tiger Global with participation from several existing investors and raised $90 million in investment in a round led by Kinnevik. As of 2014, Quikr had raised a total of $350 million from 7 funding rounds.

== Partnerships and acquisitions ==
Pepperfry has partnered with Quikr.

In January 2016, Quikr announced it had acquired the real estate portal commonfloor.com and would be merging it with its real estate division QuikrHomes. As of December 2017, Quikr had completed 5 acquisitions for its real estate business.

In July 2016, Quikr acquired the recruitment tech startup Hiree.com.

In 2017, HDFC announced the sale of its subsidiaries HDFC Realty and HDFC Developers to Quikr India in an all stock deal that will give HDFC a 3 per cent stake in Quikr India in lieu of the sale of its stake in the two subsidiaries for Rs 357 crore.

== Features ==
Quikr provides an online classified advertising platform for users to buy or sell goods and services from each other. Other services offered include a missed call service, and instant messaging.
