= Revv Cars =

Indian car hire company

- Company type: Private
- Industry: Car rental
- Founded: July 2015
- Founder: Anupam Agarwal, Karan Jain
- Headquarters: Gurgaon
- Services: "Self-drive" car rental
- Website: www.revv.co.in

Revv Cars is an Indian self-drive mobility start up funded by Hyundai and others. The company was founded by Anupam Agarwal and Karan Jain in July 2015 and started its operation in Delhi-NCR. Through Revv, customers can rent a car up to a period of 4 years. Apart from renting for specific number of hours or days, the company also let customers rent for one-way journeys. The company operates with a standard hub model - where there is a hub of cars from where the vehicles are dropped to the customers. The company staff is able to come back to the hub with the help of a foldable electric scooter which is stored in the boot of the car. The company had stopped its services during the initial lockdown for few months and resumed later. Apart from acquiring vehicles directly, the company also works on a crowdsourcing model in which individual would buy a car on a 10% down payment and register it with Revv. Revv pays a fee to the individual that is equal to the monthly installment to pay the loan which is usually for 4 years.

== Partnerships ==
Revv has partnered with Mahindra and Hyundai to offer their car on subscriptions models that allow the vehicle to be kept for longer duration. In this partnership, Mahindra sold the cars to Revv and not to its usual dealers. Further, Revv offered the cars to its customers on a subscription and covered the maintenance costs.

== Philanthropy ==
Revv offered free cars to healthcare workers during the COVID-19 pandemic in Delhi, Bengaluru, Mumbai, Chennai and Pune.

== Criticism ==
Consumer review portals like Mouthshut and Trustpilot reported reviews of customers calling it risky. Complaints regarding fraudulent changes to customers have continued to rise.
