= Equestrian statue of Mark Cubbon =

Statue in Bangalore, India

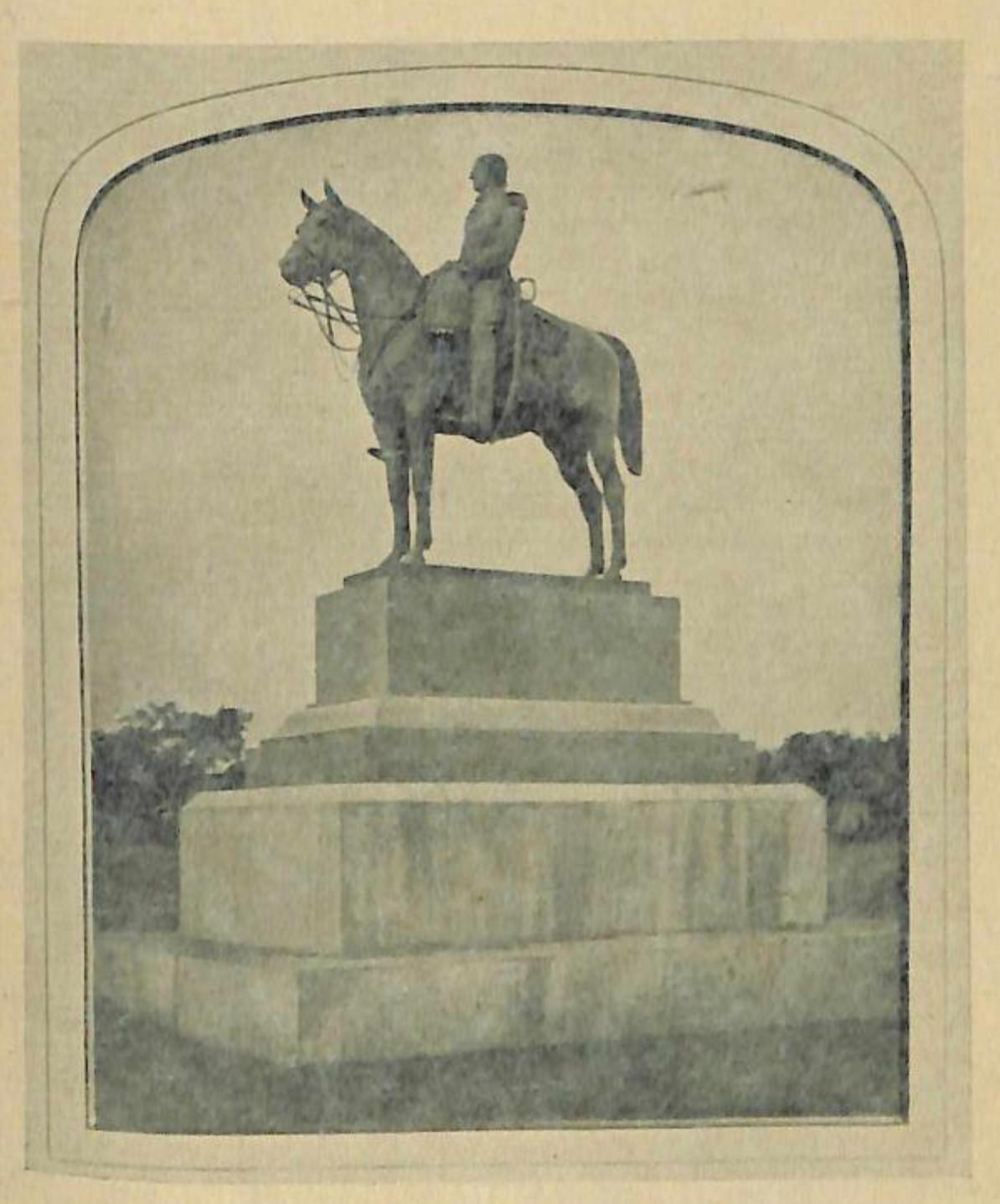
- The statue in 1932
- Artist: Carlo Marochetti
- Subject: Mark Cubbon
- Location: Bangalore, India

An equestrian statue of Mark Cubbon, a British army officer with the East India Company who was the Chief Commissioner of Mysore from 1834 to 1861, was unveiled at Bangalore, India on 16 March 1866. Sculpted by Carlo Marochetti, the statue was eventually, placed within the premises of the Karnataka High Court but was moved in 2020 to Cubbon Park, officially Sri Chamarajendra Park, to improve security around the High Court.

== History ==
Sir Mark Cubbon, was a senior East India Company officer, who acted as Chief Commissioner of Mysore. Following Sir Mark Cubbon’s death in 1861, the Government of Madras requested for public funds to fund a memorial. Maharaja Krishnaraja Wadiyar III contributed ₹10,000 to the appeal. Baron Carlo Marochetti, noted for his equestrian works in Europe, was commissioned to design and execute the statue. After casting, the statue was transported to Bangalore and formally unveiled in the Parade Grounds by Cubbon’s successor, Lewin Bentham Bowring, on 16 March 1866.

It was later relocated to the front of the Attara Kacheri (Karnataka High Court), and subsequently to its rear courtyard due to security concerns. In June 2020, following requests from the High Court and heritage advocates, the statue was permanently shifted to a public location beside the Bandstand in Cubbon Park.

== Site Changes and Relocations ==
Since its unveiling, the statue has been relocated on five occasions: Between 1866–1870, the statue was initially placed for viewing by military and civil officials in Parade Grounds. Till 1950s it was moved to the front of the Secretariat building, now Karnataka High Court. Which was then again moved to Courtyard between 1950-2019. To control the massive visiting crowds, it was later moved to Cubbon Park Bandstand. Later it was placed beside the Bandstand from June 2020.
