= Hindu Religious Institutions and Charitable Endowments Department (Karnataka) =

Agency overview
- Formed: 1997
- Jurisdiction: Government of Karnataka
- Headquarters: Bengaluru, Karnataka
- Minister responsible: K. S. Basavanthappa
- Website: https://itms.kar.nic.in/hrcehome/index.php

Hindu Religious Institutions and Charitable Endowments Department (HRI & CE) also known as Muzrai Department is a department of the Government of Karnataka, India, which delivers the administration of Hindu religious institutions and related charitable endowments in the state.

== Etymology ==
The word "Muzrai" comes from the Persian word mujra meaning payment or allowances or expression of respect. In the context of religious institutes, it means charitable contributions for their maintenance. The term used since the time of Tippu Sultan and continued under subsequent administrations. Over time, through colloquial usage in South India, the word changed into "Muzrai".

== History ==
The concept of state grants to temples and religious institutions in India dates back to antiquity. During late medieval period in Karnataka, Persian terminologies entered the administration by the influence of by the Islamic rulers of Deccan. In Karnataka, the recent history of administration of religious institutes date back to Tippu Sultan period when he directed Amildars to manage temple grants and offerings.

After Tippu Sultan death, the control of temples was brough under the direct rule under the king, Krishnaraja Wadiya III. Following the British takeover of Mysore in 1831, management of religious institutions was assigned to appointed superintendents. In 1852, Commissioner Sir Mark Cubbon centralized this administration under his office. By 1867, Indian Muzrai Assistant Commissioners were appointed to oversee the Amildars. Control of Muzrai institutions was transferred to the Huzur Daftar Department in 1876. This was followed by the appointment of a Muzrai Superintendent in 1891–1892. These administrative procedures were eventually codified into the Muzrai Regulation of 1913, which took effect on 1914.

The post independence, government of Karnataka enacted the Karnataka Hindu Religious Institutions and Charitable Endowments Act, 1997, which consolidated earlier British-era and post-independence regulations. This legislation was subsequently updated via amendments in 2007, 2011, 2012, 2024 and 2025.

Similar departments exist in other Indian states like in Andra Pradesh and Tamil Nadu.

== Administration ==
The department is headed by Minister for Muzrai. The administration fall under the control of the Principal Secretary of Revenue of state government, typically an IAS officer. Several nodal officers serve at district level with assisted by assistant commissioners.

Around 34563 notified temples of Karnataka are overseen by the department.

== See also ==
- Department of Tourism, Culture and Religious Endowments, Tamilnadu
