= Nagar revolt =

Peasant uprising in the Nagar region of the Mysore kingdom

The Nagar Revolt, also known as the Nagara peasant rebellion, was an uprising in the Nagar region (present day Shimoga district) of the Mysore kingdom, which began in August and September 1830. Primarily comprising farmers and minor officials, the rebels were bolstered by the support of some local rulers and mercenaries. The revolt continued for nearly one year, but was ultimately put down by the kingdom with the help of the British East India Company. On 9 October 1831, the administration of the kingdom was taken over by the British East India Company - a state of affairs that lasted for 50 years before the Wodeyars were re-instated as rulers under the aegis of the Crown.

== Background ==
After the Fourth Anglo-Mysore War, the British East India Company assumed indirect control of the Kingdom of Mysore through a subsidiary alliance with the Wodeyar dynasty. Krishnaraja Wodeyar III became the king of Mysore. Wasteful expenditure, ill-considered grants of land to undeserving courtiers and courtly intrigue between the royal family and Maratha Brahmin advisors led to declining revenue and rising costs in the kingdom, ultimately resulting in a recession in the 1820s.

Nagar was part of the Malnad or highland regions of Mysore. Prior to its integration with the Mysore kingdom, it was part of the Keladi kingdom, a state that declared independence from the Vijayanagar Empire in 1639. Nagar was the capital of Keladi in 1763 when Haider Ali annexed Keladi into the Mysore kingdom. Haider and his successor Tipu Sultan considered Keladi strategic in its geographic location as a buffer region between the kingdom and the Maratha state, but their efforts to integrate it into Mysore economically and culturally were resisted by the local population.

The land revenue system implemented by Shivappa Nayaka in Keladi, called shist, allowed land to be private property, and taxation of land was based on whether it was fallow or cultivated, soil quality and fertility. The system was prevalent for more than a century and highly popular. When Keladi was conquered by Haider, taxation policies underwent changes, and by the early 19th century, the Shurtee and Sayar system was adopted under Krishnaraja Wodeyar III. The Shurtee system involved many middlemen between the land cultivator and the king, with each committing to a minimum amount of tax revenue from the land under his jurisdiction, obtained through a bidding process. The system lent itself to corruption, with land administrators levying illegal taxes on the cultivators, contractors keeping any surplus income to themselves and competitors constantly out-bidding each other for tax collection contracts. The Sayar was a toll levied on goods being transported by cultivators. The population in Nagar resented the pressures they were subjected to by the new tax regime.

Descendants of the erstwhile rulers of Keladi, called the Palegars, continued to enjoy an influence across the region, and they, led by Rangappa Naik, encouraged the retention of a distinct political identity in Nagar. The emergence of a pretender to the Keladi royal lineage, Boodi Basavappa, complicated the situation across Keladi. Basavappa, in reality Sadara Mulla the son of a farmer, had obtained the signet rings of the last Keladi ruler from the latter's spiritual advisor and exploited his possession of them to stake a claim to the kingdom of Nagar. He also carried a falsified document that elicited support for his claim from the British East India Company. Basavappa exploited the rising opposition to the taxation system amongst the farmers of the region, and rose to lead the uprising that began in 1830.

A significant part of the Nagar population was Lingayat, and the dominance of Deshastha Brahmin in the kingdom's administration could also have played a role in inciting the rebellion.

Due to declining revenue from Nagar, the king deputed two of his advisors, Ram Rao and Venkata Kistniah, to visit the region in 1827. The farmers complaints of taxation of uncultivated land and excessive pressure by administrators including torture, resulted in Ram Rao remitting the collection of some rent. Political opponents of Ram Rao attributed this remission to his receiving bribes and personal ambitions of influence over the geography. The king appointed his relative, Veera Raj Urs as the Nagar administrator in the place of Kishen Rao, and Urs revoked the remissions.

== The rebellion ==
The local leaders and peasants started gathering in mass meetings, called Kuttams, to express their dissatisfaction with the tax system and the administration. Rumours about the return of the kingdom of Nagar, centred around Boodi Basavappa's claims, also circulated ever since Basavappa proclaimed himself king of Nagar during his wedding in April 1830. In August, he deputed a confidant, Monnappa, to attack the Anantapur fort in Nagar. The attack failed but disturbances began breaking out across the Nagar district. The peasants of Nagar sent letters to neighbouring areas asking people to gather in Kuttams and stop paying taxes and cultivating land. The letters were accompanied by leaves of Margosa, a signal in the region for farmers to mobilize.

By December 1830, Basavappa and Rangappa Naik together had inspired uprisings in areas far away, like Bangalore, Chittledurg and Manjarbad. Many of the insurgents believed Basavappa's assertion that the British supported his claim to the Nagar throne. Naik promised lower taxation and a restoration of the Keladi kingdom, evoking nostalgia amongst the farmers for what they regarded as happier times. The local administration of the kingdom resorted to increasingly violent means of countering the rebellion, with more than 50 deaths and 200 injured in clashes in Nagar alone by the end of 1830. However they had to contend with desertions from their ranks: around 1500 of the 15000 Candachar Peons (armed police) joined the rebellion. The peons in remote regions of the kingdom were not particularly loyal to the king, and they were not paid regularly, with arrears amounting in many cases to up to 18 months of salary.

Meanwhile, the king, upset by Urs' inability to deal with the rebellion, re-instated Kishen Rao as administrator in November. Kishen Rao, with the kingdom's troops at his disposal, marched to Nagar. En route, at Holi-Hoonor, he came across two to three thousand farmers in a kuttam. When the latter tried to take a local fort on 7 December, Kishen Rao's troops killed 10 farmers and injured more than a hundred in an engagement. The kuttam dispersed only to regroup 25 kilometres north, at Honnali, where their ranks were swollen to between seven and twenty thousand by other farmers joining the meeting. Kishen Rao's army attacked this meeting too, and captured 25 farmers whose noses and ears were cut off. The ensuing panic resulted in thousands of peasants fleeing to territory owned by the British East India Company.

The Company had remained at an arm's length from events. Apart from warning the king about the progress of the uprisings and the ensuing violence and reporting to the government of the Madras Presidency, the local Resident, James Archibald Casamajor, tried to keep British troops out of the action. He advised the king to travel himself or dispatch his Dewan to the Nagar region to quell the rebellion and address its causes. He also assented to holding a regiment of Company infantry and two squadrons of cavalry in Bangalore for any emergencies.

The king decided to travel first to Manjarbad, which had also been affected. Casamajor reached the region earlier and advised the farmers to maintain peace and await the king's arrival. The Dewan of the king, Venkata Raj Urs, wrote to the peasants in Yeggetti taluk, telling them of the king's imminent arrival. As the king traveled through troubled areas, he dismissed a few errant administrators. He reached Channarayapatna in Manjarbad on 18 December 1830 and ordered the masses gathered there to disperse. Infuriated, the farmers refused. The army executed 5 farmers and flogged several more. The kuttam broke up, and the king returned to Mysore rather than visiting Nagar.

Rangappa Naik and his nephew laid siege to the forts in Culdroog and Camundroog, Nagar, in December. The king again removed Kishen Rao and appointed Annappa in his place. Venkataraj Urs traveled to retake the two forts. The rebels fought Annappa and the kingdom's army for two months, forcing Annappa to retreat to the Anantapur fort. When the rebels besieged Anantapur, the army suffered significant losses and Annappa was forced to seek refuge in Company territory. He, and a Company military officer, Lieutenant Rochfort, then joined Venkataraj Urs. The forts were retaken by March 1831. The last battle in Camundroog resulted in 50 rebel and 23 army deaths.

Rochfort and Urs joined Annappa and Infantry Commander Syed Salar at Shimoga, and marched to Honnali, where the insurgents had occupied the fort. They stormed the fort on 12 March 1831, and captured 180 rebels. Of these, 99 were executed. There are conflicting reports of who ordered the executions. Salar wrote to Urs claiming that Rochfort did, but Annappa later testified that it was Urs who decided himself. Urs blamed Annappa instead while Rochfort claimed he had no judicial authority and had handed the prisoners over to the native leaders.

Rochfort captured Nagar town on 26 March 1831, and Chendergooty fort on 6 April, without much fighting. The Company sent their 24th Regiment, under Colonel Woulfe, from Bangalore to Shimoga to maintain civil peace. The regiment turned back a large cavalry which was traveling south from the Maratha kingdom to aid Basavappa in mid-April.

The king replaced Venkataraj Urs with Baloji Rao as Dewan in April. Violence continued in Nagar though. The Company's 15th Regiment had to return from Futtehpet after several soldiers were killed and injured by rebels. The Company responded with re-inforcements. In late May, the rebels retook Nagar, but Company and royal forces marched out even as the Resident held discussions with the rebels. On 12 June 1831, the Resident and the majority of the rebels signed terms of peace. Basavappa was rumoured to have escaped to the Hyderabad kingdom, while Rangappa Naik was thought to have died.

There are varying accounts of the death toll during the rebellion. The Mysore kingdom's tally of rebels executed was 164, while the investigating Committee estimated it at 240. Rebels killed in action are believed to be around 500-600 by one account, while Annappa claimed that his troops killed 700.

== Aftermath ==
The king surrendered his kingship on 19 October 1831. The kingdom of Mysore was ruled directly by the British for the next half century, restoring native rule, in 1881, subordinated to the British Crown.

The British East India Company appointed a committee to determines the causes of the uprising. Comprising Major General Thomas Hawker, William Morison, J M Macleod and Mark Cubbon, the committee spent a year investigating, and submitted its report on 12 December 1833 to Governor-General Lord William Bentinck. The committee relied on oral testimony by witnesses, some of which were contradictory and a few also proven to be false. Most witnesses were active participants in the events under investigation and some went on to be employed by the British administration. The report blamed the rebellion on the king's style of ruling and personal character, and not particularly on tax laws. The report did acknowledge that the standard of living in the kingdom had deteriorated since the turn of the century, due to factors beyond the king's control, like bad crop seasons and reduced income.
