= Administration of the kingdom of Mysore =

The kingdom of Mysore (Kannada: ಮೈಸೂರು ಸಂಸ್ಥಾನ; 1399–1947 CE) was a kingdom in southern India traditionally believed to have been founded in 1399 in the region of the city of Mysore in Karnataka. For the most part, the Wodeyar dynasty ruled the southern Karnataka region until the kingdom united with the Dominion of India in 1947. During the kingdom's history, it went through various phases of administration, with increasing foreign influence from the eighteenth century.

== Pre-colonial era administration ==
During the decline of the Vijayanagara Empire, King Yaduraya Wodeyar (1399–1423) gradually gained independence, eventually ousting the Vijayanagar governor at Srirangapatna. The regional head of the empire moved their new capital at Chandragiri. During the rule of Narasaraja Wodeyar, the first gold coins were issued from Mysore. The position of Mysore improved considerably during the rule of King Chikka Devaraja Wodeyar, who increased the value of the Treasury to 90,000,000 pagoda (a unit of currency). For this achievement, the king took the title Navakotinarayana (lit. nine-crore Narayana). Chikka Devaraja (1673–1704) founded the Attara Kacheri, a central secretariat consisting of eighteen departments.

Under Hyder Ali (1761–1782), a large booty of gold looted from the Nizam of Golconda funded Mysore's expansionary policy. The kingdom was divided into 5 provinces (Asofis), comprising 171 Paraganas (taluk). The Sira province comprised 5 Paraganas that contributed 200,000 varaha (a unit of currency) and the Srirangapatna province contained 102 Paraganas and contributed 1,700,000 varaha.

During the reign of Tipu Sultan (1782–1799), the kingdom, which encompassed 62,000 mi^{2} (160,000 km^{2}), was divided into 37 Asofi and a total of 124 taluks (Amil). Each Asofi had a governor, or Asof, and one deputy Asof. A taluk was headed by an Amildar while a Patel was in charge of a group of villages. The central administration comprised six departments headed by ministers, each aided by an advisory council of up to four members; the military by Mir Miran, the revenue ministry by Mir Asaf, the navy by Mir Yem, and the treasury, commerce, and ordnance by Muluk-ut-Tufar. The policy of replacing Hindu governors with Muslim Asofs may have led to a revenue downfall. For a brief period, Kannada was replaced by Persian as the administrative language under Tipu's reign. The army consisted of infantry, cavalry, artillery, and the navy. The navy had forty ships operating from Mangalore, Kundapura, and Tadadi.

== Direct British rule ==
Following Tipu's death in 1799, the kingdom came under direct British rule in 1831. Lushington, Briggs, and Morrison, the early commissioners, were followed by Mark Cubbon and Lewin Bentham Bowring. Mark Cubbon took charge in 1834. He made Bangalore the capital and divided the princely state into 4 divisions, each under a British superintendent. The state was further divided into 120 taluks with 85 taluk courts, with all lower level administration in the Kannada language. The Amildar was in charge of a taluk to whom a Hoblidar, the caretaker of a Hobli comprising a few villages, reported. The office of the commissioner had eight departments; revenue, post, police, cavalry, public works, medical, the animal husbandry, judiciary and education. The judiciary was hierarchical with the commissioners' court at the apex, followed by the Huzur Adalat, four superintending courts and eight Sadar Munsiff courts at the lowest level. Mark Cubbon is credited with the construction of over one thousand miles of roads, hundreds of dams, coffee production and improvements in the tax and revenue systems.

Lewin Bowring became the chief commissioner in 1862 and held the position until 1870. Under Lewin Bowring, the state was divided into three divisions, each under a British commissioner. There were eight districts in all under these divisions, with each looked after by a deputy commissioner who was aided by the Amildars and Hoblidars. The property "Registration Act", the "Indian Penal code" and "Code of Criminal Procedure" came into effect and the judiciary was separated from the executive branch of the administration. Lewin Bowring expanded the education system with the formation of the Central Educational Agency, helping the kingdom modernize quickly. However, unlike Mark Cubbon, Lewin Bowring generally preferred to employ British officers.

== Rendition, legislative, and economic developments ==
In 1881, following a strong lobby favouring rendition, the British handed back the administration of Mysore to King Chamarajendra Wadiyar X (1868–1894). The post of commissioner was abolished and replaced by a Diwan, his two advisers, and a British resident in the Mysore court.

C. V. Rungacharlu, a native of Chennai, became the Diwan while the Mysore Representative Assembly, consisting of 144 members, was formed in 1881. He identified himself with the Kannada language and patronised it by establishing the Palace drama company. He passed favourable economic policies such as public loans and public works and built a railway line from Bangalore to Mysore.

He was followed by K. Seshadri Iyer in 1883. During his time, gold mining at the Kolar Gold Fields began, extensive coffee plantations were developed, and railway lines were laid. The first assembly elections were held with a three-year tenure. Taluk boards were formed with decentralised authority, the Mysore Civil Service examinations were held for the first time in 1891, and the geology and agriculture departments were established in 1894 and 1898, respectively. Other notable achievements include the construction of the Vanivilas Sagar dam across the Vedavati river, the initiation of the Shivanasamudra hydroelectric project in 1899 (the first such major attempt in India), electricity and piped drinking water in Bangalore, the first edition of the Archaeological Survey of Mysore in 1890, and the Oriental Manuscripts Library.

P. N. Krishnamurti, a descendant of Diwan Purnaiah, took office in 1901. The founding of The Secretariat Manual for maintaining records, the introduction of British administrative methods, and the founding of the Co-operative Department in 1905 are credited to him. V. P. Madhava Rao, who became Diwan in 1906, paid attention to conservation of forests. He started the Legislative Council in 1907, the Central Co-operative Bank in Bangalore, aided the Vokkaligara Sangha in 1906 and created the Mysore News Paper Regulation Act of 1908. He was followed by T. Ananda Rao, who inaugurated the Mysore Economic Conference, finalised the Krishna Raja Sagara dam and completed the Mysore Palace in 1910.

M. Visvesvaraya, an engineer, became Diwan in 1909. The Mysore Legislative Assembly was increased from 18 to 24 members, with new powers for discussing the state budget. The Mysore Economic Conference was expanded into three committees: industry and commerce, education, and agriculture, with publications in English and Kannada. Village panchayats, local boards, and municipalities were headed by elected members. Projects commissioned during his tenure include the construction of the Krishna Raja Sagara dam, the Government Soap Factory, the Mysore Sandal Oil Factory, the founding of the Iron and Steel Works in Bhadravati, and the Mysore Bank. Visvesvaraya founded the University of Mysore in 1916, the Mysore Chamber of Commerce and Industry, the Visvesvaraya College of Engineering in Bangalore, and the Karnataka Sahitya Parishad. He was followed by Sir M. Kantaraj Urs in 1919 and Sir Albion Rajkumar Banerjee in 1922.

== Last Diwans ==
Sir Mirza Ismail took office as Diwan in 1926 and continued making progress in modernising the kingdom of Mysore. Amongst his contributions were the expansion of the Bhadravati iron works and the founding of a cement and paper factory in Bhadravati. A porcelain factory and a glass factory were founded in Bangalore, a sugar factory in Mysore, and the first fertilizer factory in Belgola. Ismail founded the Brindavan Gardens (Krishnaraja Sagar), the Mysore Medical College, and the Kaveri high-level canal to irrigate 120,000 acres (490 km^{2}) in modern Mandya district. Ismail was followed by Sir N. Madhava Rao and Sir Arcot Ramasamy Mudaliar before the kingdom was incorporated into the newly independent India in 1947.
