= Cubbon Park =

Cubbon Park Sri Chamarajendra Park
- Neighbourhood
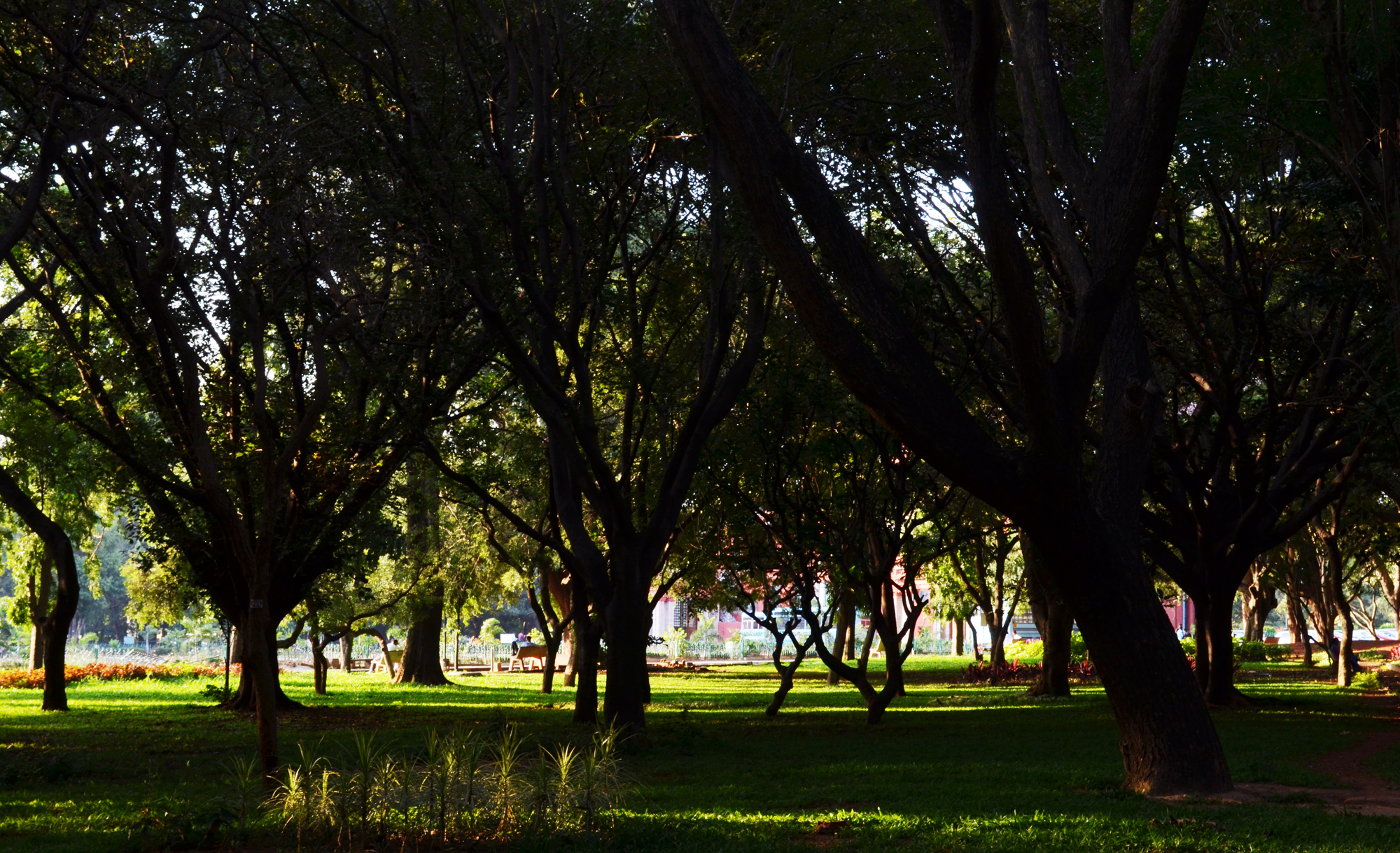

- Location in Bengaluru, India
- Coordinates: 12°58′30″N 77°35′36″E
- Country: India
- State: Karnataka
- District: Bengaluru Urban
- Metro: Bengaluru
- Founded: 1870
- Founder: Sir John Meade
- Named for: Maharaja Chamarajendra Wadiyar X

Government
  - Body: Department of Horticulture, Government of Karnataka

Area
  - Total: 1.2 km^{2} (0.46 sq mi)

Languages
  - Official: Kannada
- Time zone: UTC+5:30 (IST)
- Pin Code: 560001
- Website: http://www.horticulture.kar.nic.in/cubbon.htm

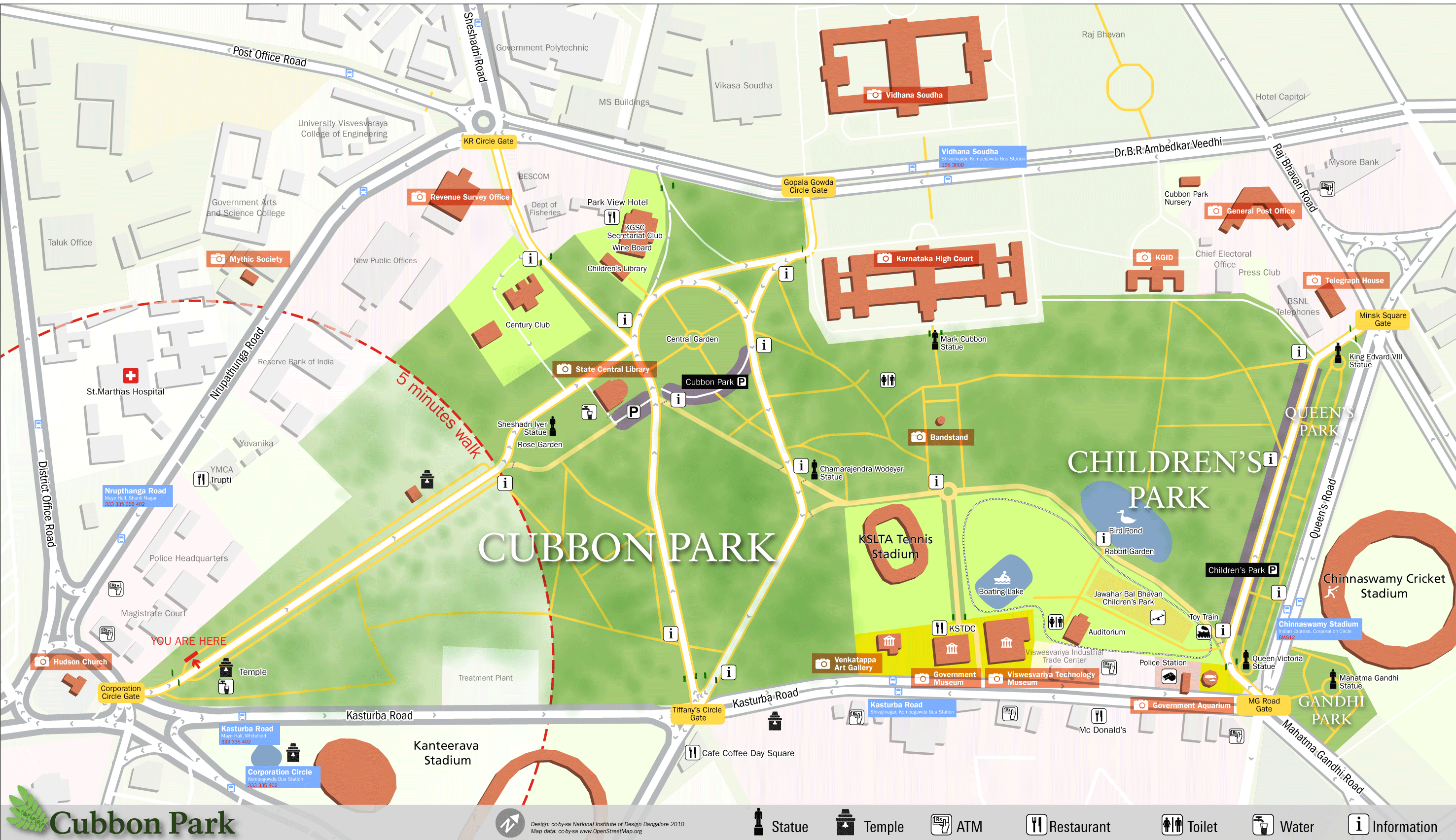
A Map of Cubbon Park made with OpenStreetMap

Sri Chamarajendra Park, formerly known as Cubbon Park is a landmark park in Bengaluru, located in the heart of the city in the Central Business District. Originally created in 1870 under Major General Richard Sankey, then British Chief Engineer of Mysore State, it covered an area of 100 acres (0.40 km^{2}). Subsequent expansion has since taken place and the park's area is now reported to be 300 acres (1.2 km^{2}). It has a rich recorded history of abundant flora and fauna plantations coupled with numerous impressive and aesthetically located buildings and statues of famous personages, in its precincts.

This public park was first named as Meade's Park after Sir John Meade, the acting commissioner of Mysuru in 1870 and subsequently renamed as Cubbon Park after the longest-serving commissioner of the time, Sir Mark Cubbon, when Meade left for a new assignment in Baroda in 1873. To commemorate the Silver Jubilee of Sri Krishnaraja Wodeyar's rule in Mysore State, in 1927, the park was again renamed as Sri. Chamarajendra Park, in memory of the 19th-century ruler of the state Sri Chamarajendra Wodeyar (1868–94), during whose rule the park came into existence.

The landscaping in the park creatively integrates natural rock outcrops with thickets of trees, massive bamboos, with grassy expanse and flowerbeds and the monuments within its limits, regulated by the Horticulture Department of the Government of Karnataka. The predominantly green area of the park has many motorable roads, and the well-laid-out walking paths running through the park are frequented by early morning walkers and the naturalists who study plants in the tranquil natural environment. Tourists visiting this park in the city of Bengaluru have nicknamed the city itself as 'Garden City'.

The importance of the park to the city's environment is best stated by two urban architects who have won the national competition to design 'Freedom Park'.

== Access ==
The park is accessible from M.G. Road, Kasturba Road, Hudson Circle and Ambedkar Veedhi (Road). The motorable roads which run through the park are allowed for light motor vehicles only. All locations of the park are accessible through walking paths. The park is open to the public at all times but the roads around the park are closed to traffic from 5:00 to 8:00 am every day to provide a safe and fresh environment for morning walkers and exercisers and also this park will be closed every Sunday.

The nearest metro station to reach Cubbon Park is the Cubbon Park metro station, which is 15 meters away from one of the entrances to the park and vidhana soudha metro station

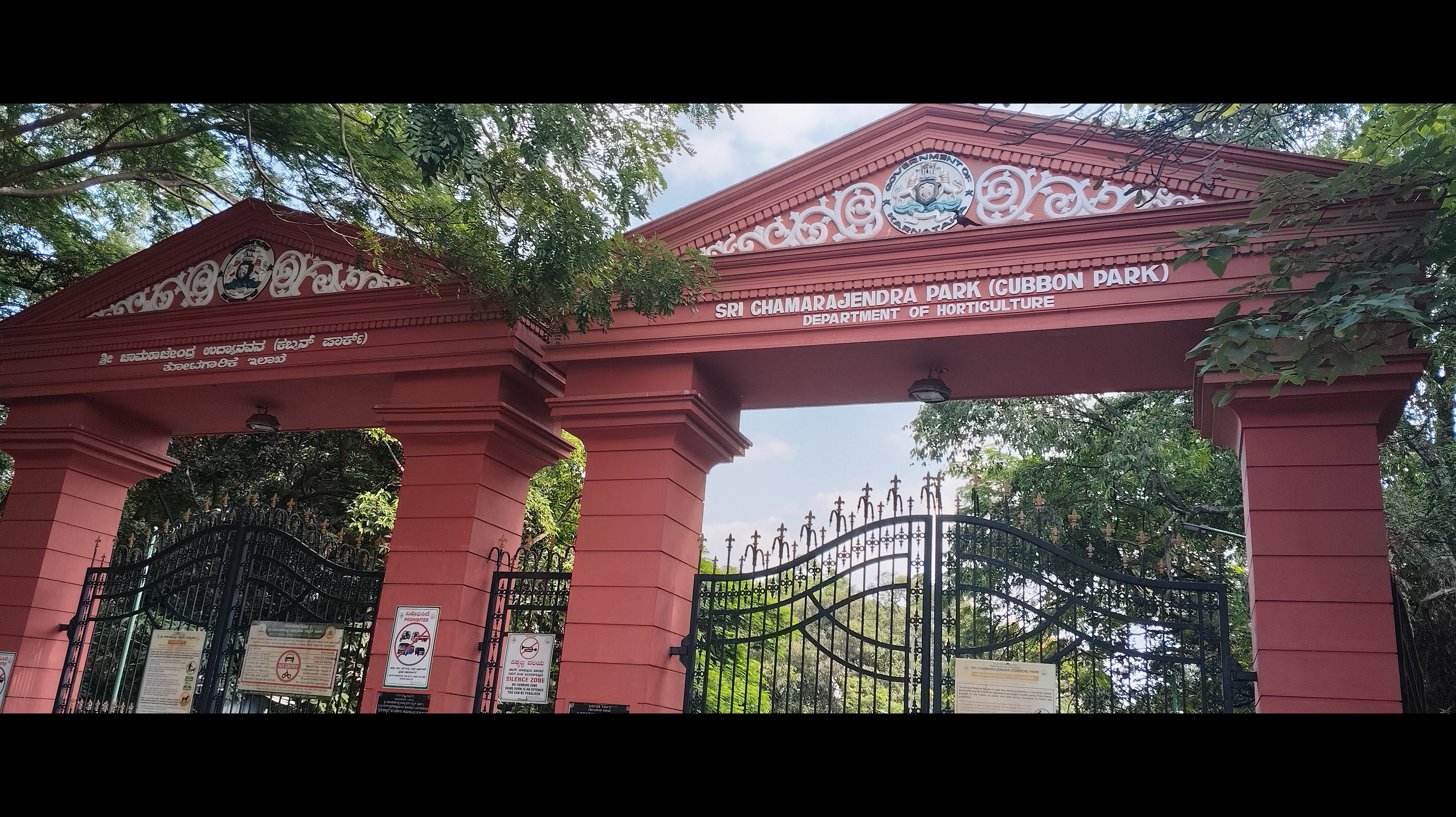
cubbon park entrance from high court side or from vidhana soudha metro station side

== Botanical assets ==
Indigenous and exotic botanical species found in the park are about 68 genera and 96 species with a total of around 6000 plants/trees. Indigenous species found in the park are: artocarpus, cassia fistula, ficus, polyalthias etc., and exotic species such as araucaria, bamboo, castanospermum australe, grevillea robusta, millettia, peltophorum, schinus molle, swietenia mahagoni, tabebuia. sp etc.

Amongst the ornamental and flowering exotic trees lining the roads in the park are the Grevillea robusta (silver oak)—the first oaks introduced to Bangalore from Australia—and the delonix or the gulmohar tree (bright red flowers with long petals) along the Cubbon road in the park, which is a widely cultivated tropical ornamental tree around the world.

=== Avenues ===
The avenue of araucarias along with canna beds on either sides of the road from the Central Public Library to Hudson circle, avenue of Swieteninas in the Northern side of the park, the Java fig avenue along the road leading to the Government Museum, polyalthia avenue along the road from Queen Victoria's statue to King Edward VII's statue and the chestnut tree avenue from the Chamarajendra statue to Siddalingaiah circle are testimony to the botanical richness of the park. Other attractions at the park are the Ringwood circle, lotus pond and bamboo grove nook.

== Historical buildings and monuments integral to the park ==
The formal gardens, from the central hall of the original Attara Kacheri (means 18 government offices) now the Karnataka High Court, extends along the ceal promenade developed symmetrically with avenues, to the museum building. Another impressive artistic structure is Iyer Hall, which houses the Central Library with a rose garden as a frontage. It is undisputedly the largest public library in the state as evidenced by the college students thronging to read here, and has the world's most extensive collection of Braille books. Other buildings located within or at the periphery of the park are 1) the Indira Priyadarshini Children's Library, 2) the Venkatappa Art Gallery, 3) the Aquarium (stated to be the second largest in India), 4) the YMCA, 5) Yuvanika — the State Youth Centre, 6) Century Club, 7) Press Club, 8) Jawahar Bal Bhavan, 9) Tennis Pavilion, 10) the Cheshire Dyer Memorial Hall and 11) the Ottawa Chatter.

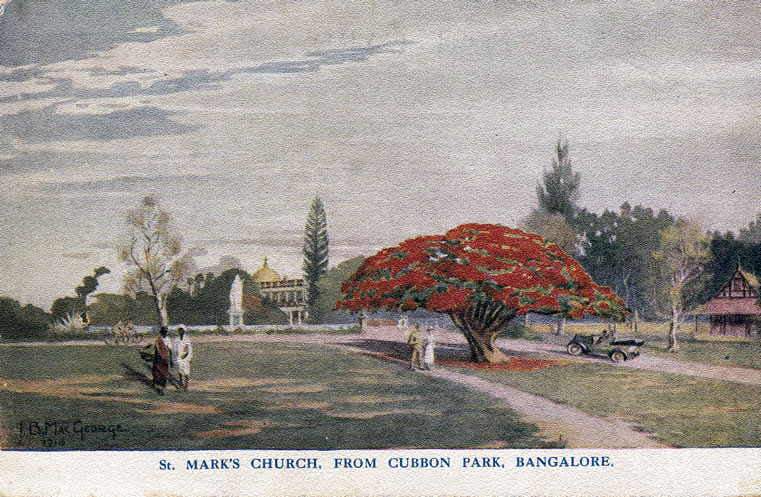
St Mark's Church, From Cubbon Park, Bengaluru

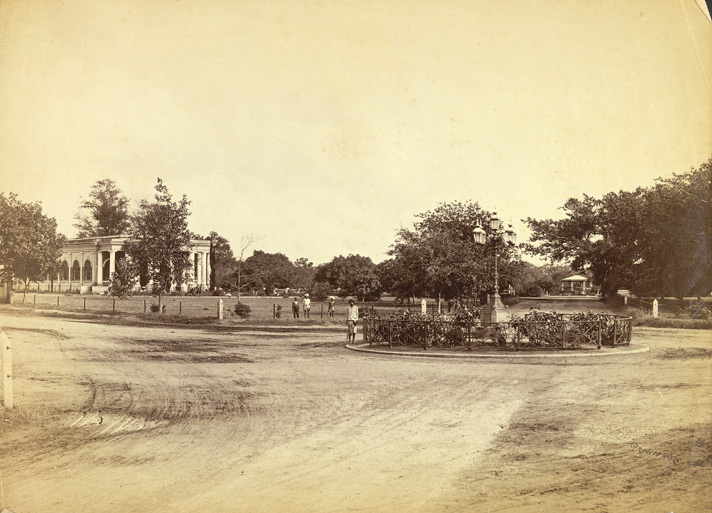
St. Mark's Church and Band Stand, Bangalore (1870). 'Views in Bangalore', of the Vibart Collection, by Albert Thomas

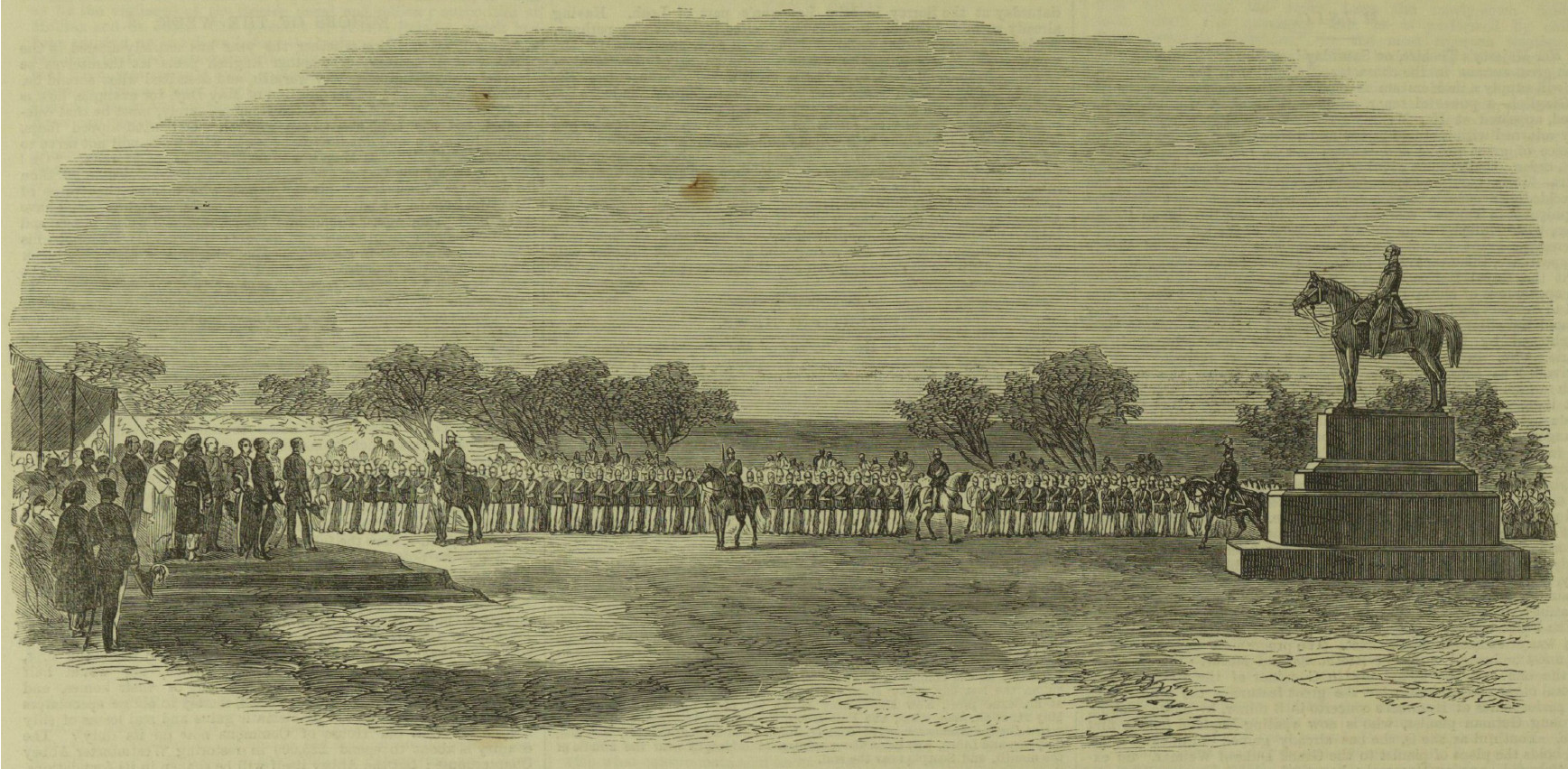
Inauguration of the statue of Sir Mark Cubbon, Bengaluru India. Illustrated London News, 5 May 1866

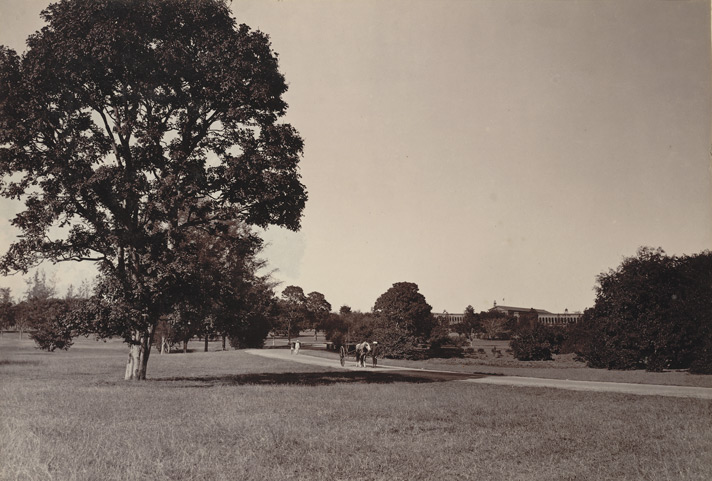
Cubbon Park, Bengaluru (1890). Curzon Collection's 'Souvenir of Mysore Album'

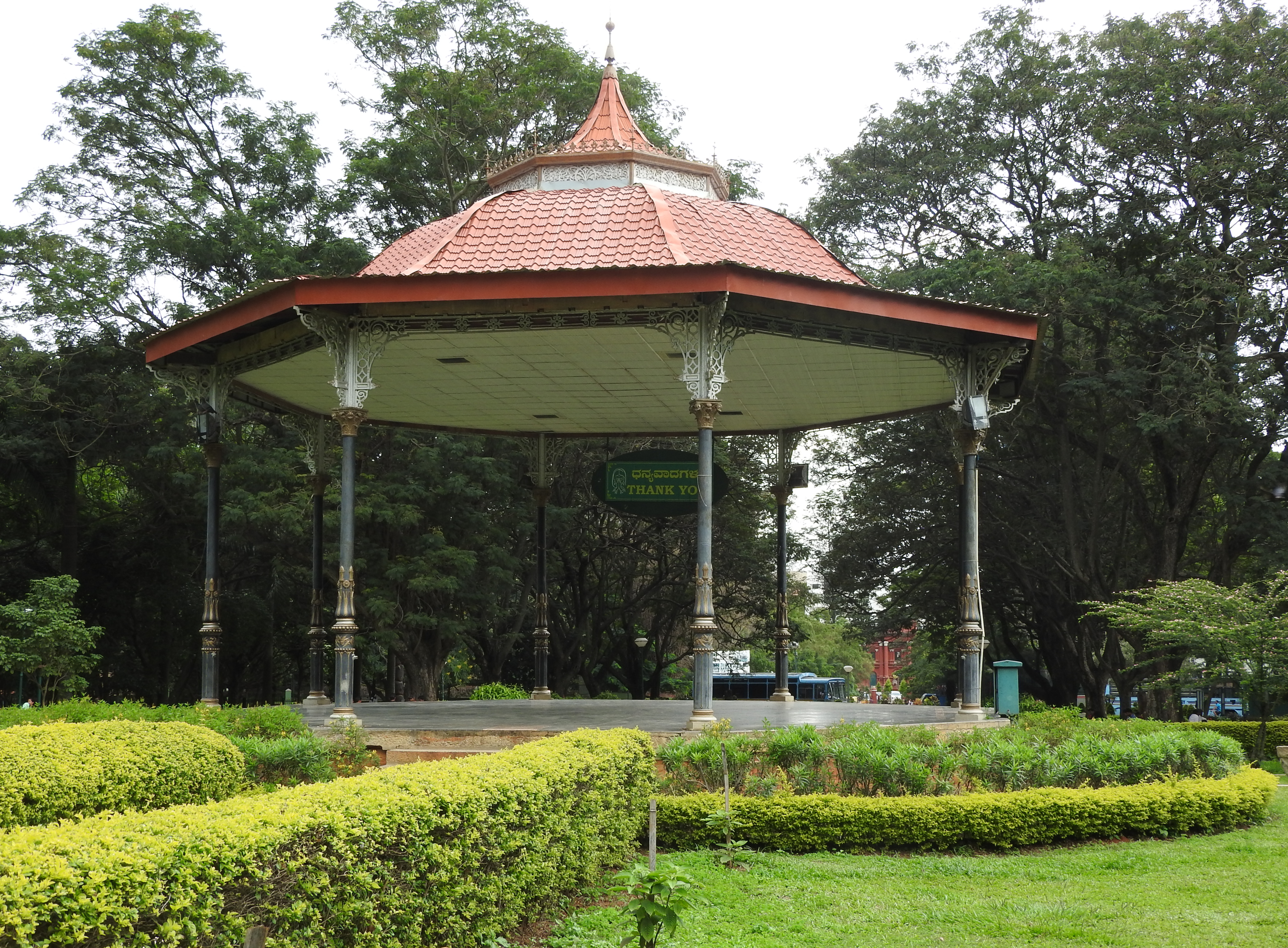
Bandstand at Cubbon Park

A bandstand, in an octagonal shape made with cast-iron, was built in the early part of the 1900s. Before India's Independence, the British Royal Air Force used to play western band music at the band stand every Saturday evening. An attraction for children is the well planned children's amusement park as part of Jawahar Bal Bhavan, which has the toy train, Putani Express that runs (0.75 miles or 1.2 km) within the park, the Doll museum and a boating facility. A 20-million-year-old fossilized tree — a gift from the Geological Survey of India, is also reported at the park.

Memorials in the form of marble statues in honour of Queen Victoria (installed in 1906), King Edward VII (installed in 1919), Major General Sir Mark Cubbon, Sri Chamarajendra Wodeyar (installed in 1927) and Sir K. Sheshadri Iyer (installed (in 1913) are seen located in front of the historical buildings within the park.

=== Attara Kacheri ===
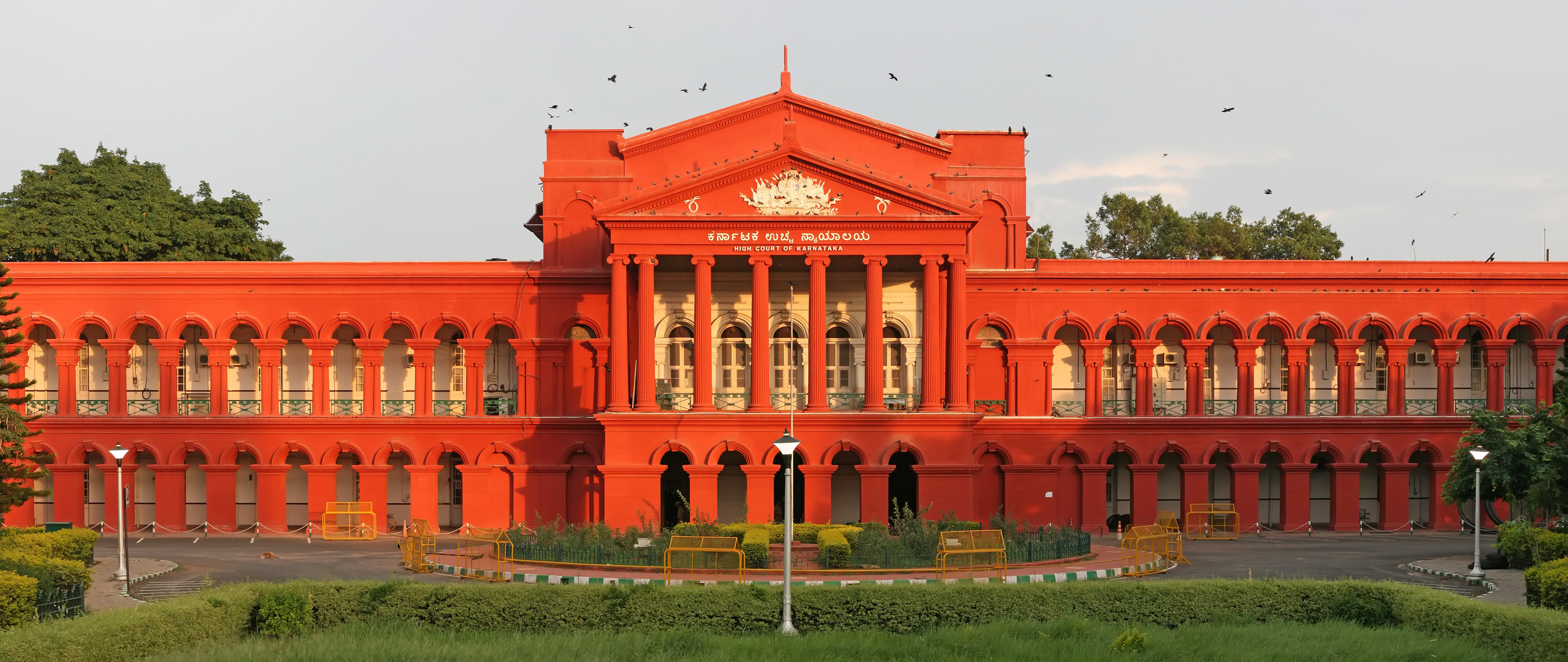
Originally Attarakacheri now the High Court of Karnataka in Bangalore at the entrance to Cubbon Park

Attara Kacheri, built in 1864 A.D during British rule, is a stone structure in an intense red hue, a two storied building with Corinthian columns in Gothic Style of architecture and is located at the entrance to the park. The Public offices (Secretariat of the Government of Karnataka) were located here from 1868 AD to 1956 AD, which were later moved to the Vidhana Soudha, opposite to it. The building now accommodates the Karnataka High Court. In the Central Hall a portrait of Sir Mark Cubbon decorates the ceiling. An equestrian statue of Cubbon by Baron Marochetti is located at the back of the building.

=== Museum ===
The State Archeological Museum, one of the oldest in India, built in 1876 by Colonel Sankey, located within the park, is similar in design to the Attara Kacheri in its architectural style and hue. While the original collection in the museum belonged to Benjamin L. Rice of the Mysore Gazetteer, antiquities from Mohenjodaro period are on display in the museum. Exhibits in the museum include specimens of Vijaynagara and Halebid architecture, ancient coins and stone inscriptions as old as 5000 years.

=== Seshadri Iyer Memorial Hall ===
Seshadri Iyer Memorial Hall, built in 1915 in a classic European style with Tuscan and Corinthian columns, in honour of Sir K. Seshadri Iyer who was Dewan of Mysore State from 1883 to 1901, is an impressive red building with gables. It houses the Seshadri Memorial library. The memorial building is ensconced in the middle of the park, framed by the greenery of the park and fronted by the rose garden. The library has an area of 300 km ^{2} and functions as the apex of the Karnataka Public Libraries system, which is governed by State Library Authority. In 2000, the library was awarded the Raja Rammohan Roy Library Foundation Award for the best state central library in India in recognition of its outstanding contribution to meritorious services rendered in the spread of knowledge and gearing up of library movement in the city of Bengaluru in particular and in the state of Karnataka in general. The library has presently a collection of 265,000 books and also a braille section.

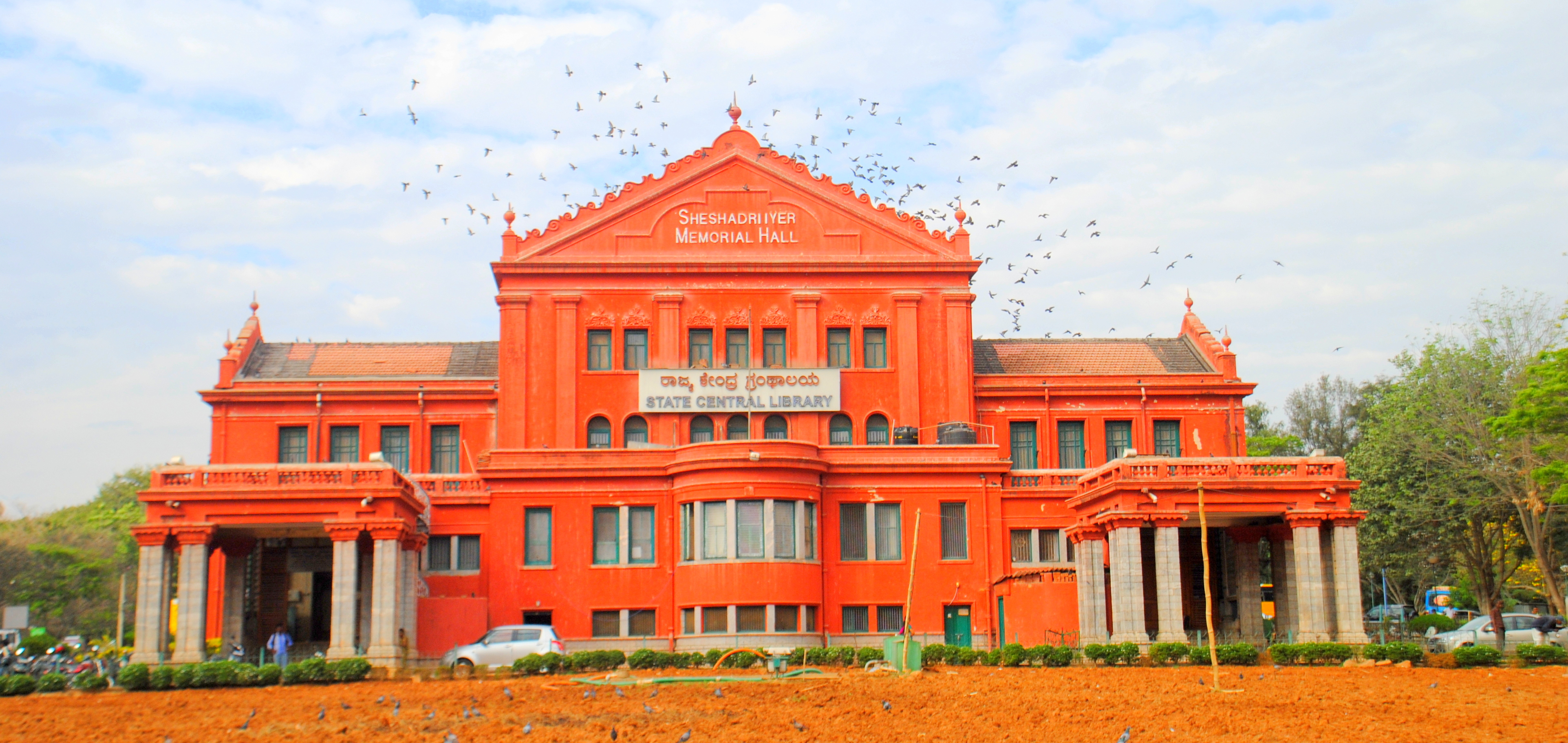
Seshadri Iyer Memorial Library in Cubbon Park (Front)

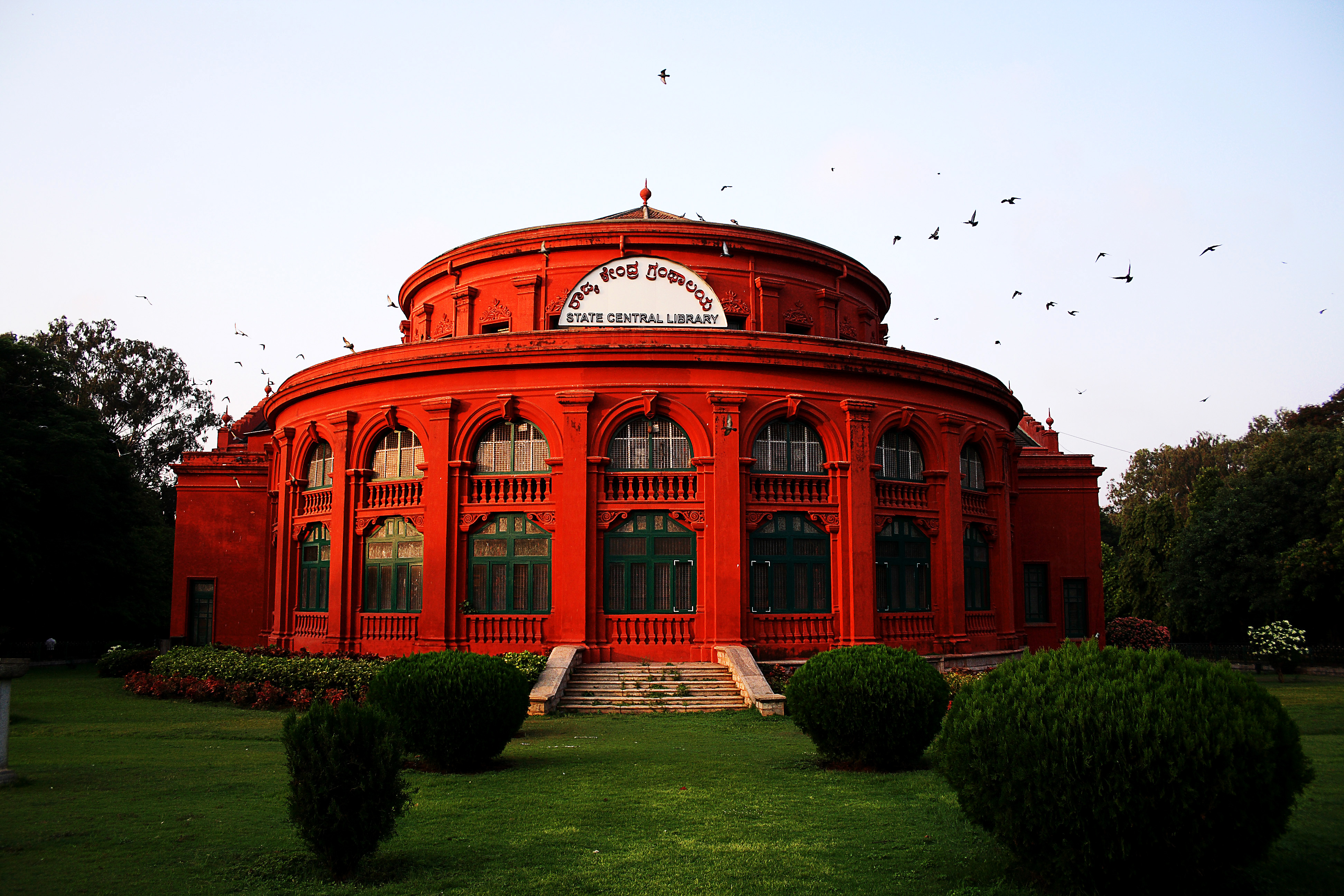
Seshadri Iyer Memorial Library in Cubbon Park (Back)

== Preservation Act, 1979 ==
The Preservation Act, 1979, passed by the Government of Karnataka to preserve the uniqueness of the park is under the provision of Karnataka Government Park (Preservation) Act, 1975, which states:

Accordingly, it is directed that neither any land should be granted to nor any further constructions be permitted whether temporary or permanent by any organization or individuals in the Cubbon Park and Lalbagh areas except the constructions taken up by the Horticulture Department in furtherance of the objectives of the department.

== Awareness campaign ==
The Centre for Environment Education (CEE), India, in the year 2006, embarked on a project to develop a brochure on the park and involve the youth in several activities to help them to explore the park and through it, learn more about the wider environment. The brochure brought out as a joint effort of CEE and the Department of Horticulture.

== Honoring Mark Cubbon ==
After being largely ignored since Indian independence in 1947, a large number of people have slowly started to acknowledge the pioneering work done by Mark Cubbon and other British administrators. On 23 August 2013, the statue of Mark Cubbon was garlanded for the first time since 1947, by Advocate S Umesh of the Cubbon Park Walkers' Association. The occasion was to mark the 238th birth anniversary of Sir Mark Cubbon. Special permission was obtained from the Karnataka High Court, and police protection was provided. The group credited Mark for being one of the chief architects of Bengaluru and Mysuru. The move was however opposed by Vatal Nagaraj, infamous for vandalizing the Cenotaph Memorial near the Hudson Memorial Church. However, the association defended their move of honoring Mark Cubbon, as his contribution to Bengaluru was undeniable. Cubbon Park was renamed as Sri Chamarajendra Park way back in 1927, but the name was never popular, and people continued to call it Cubbon Park. Further, according to historians, it would be foolish to erase history, by trying to remove all symbols of British rule, and mere symbolism cannot lead to development.

On 28 June 2020, the equestrian statue of Mark Cubbon was moved to the park grounds from the premises of Karnataka High Court.

== Gallery ==
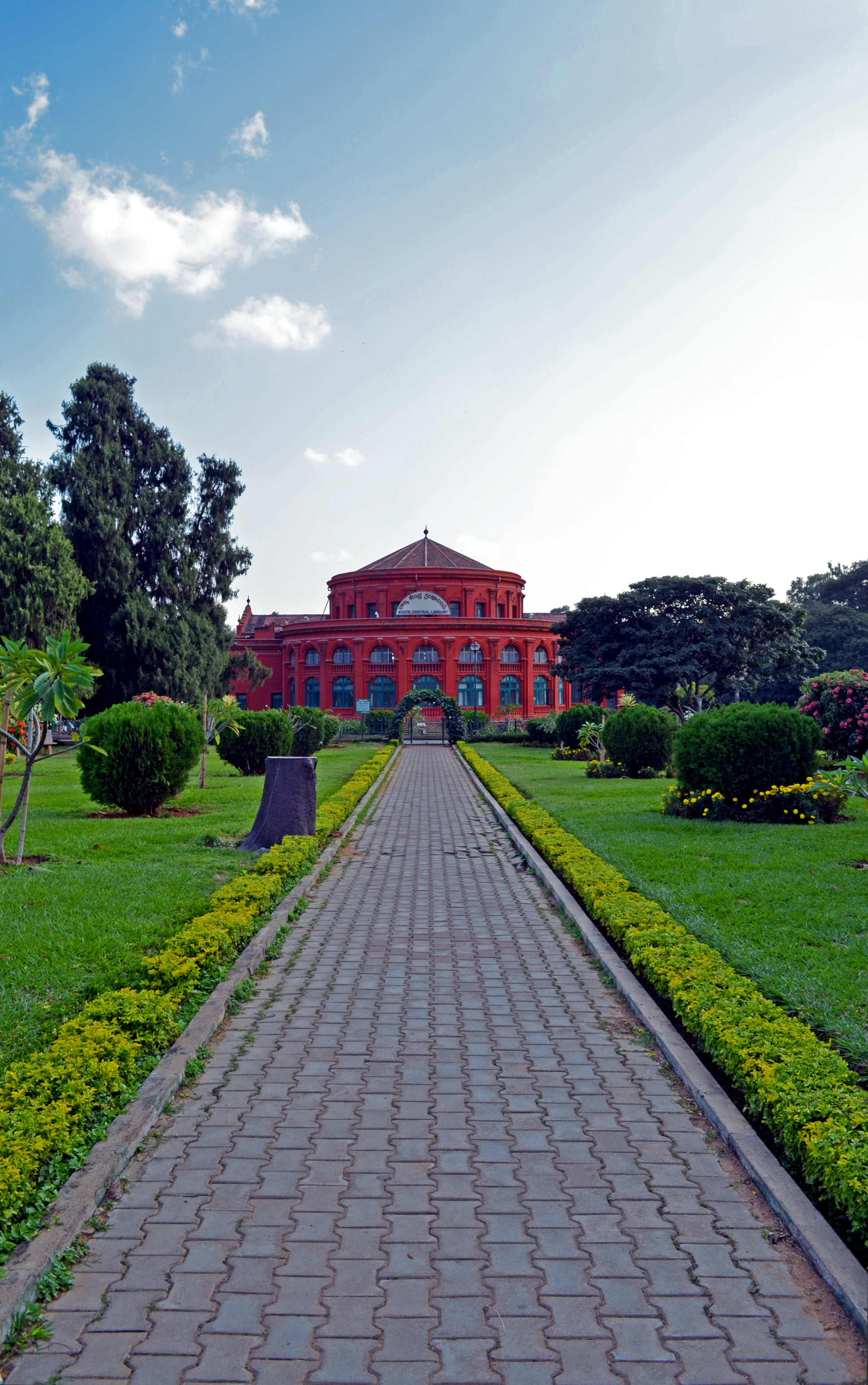
Cubbon Park

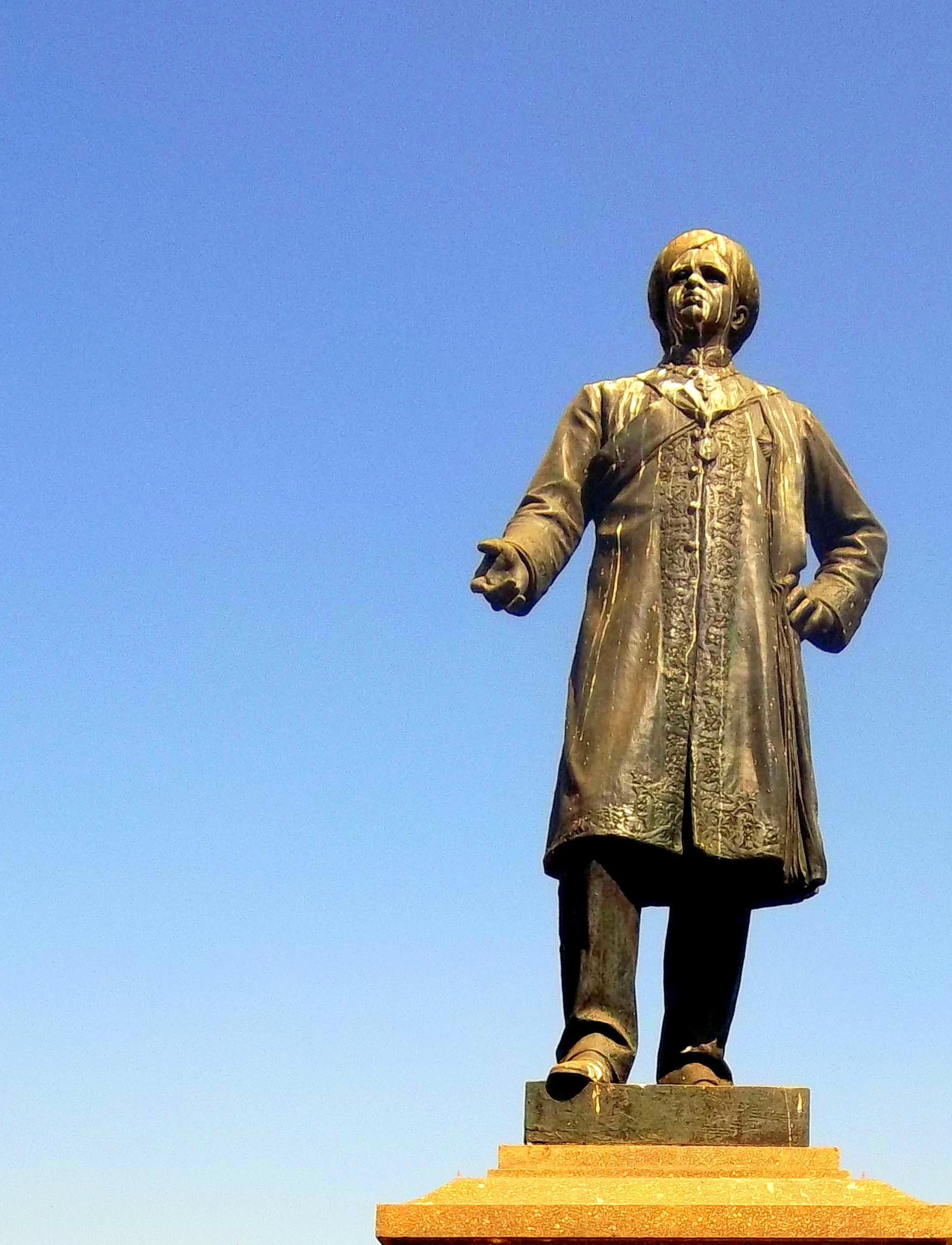
Statue of Sir K.Sheshadri Iyer

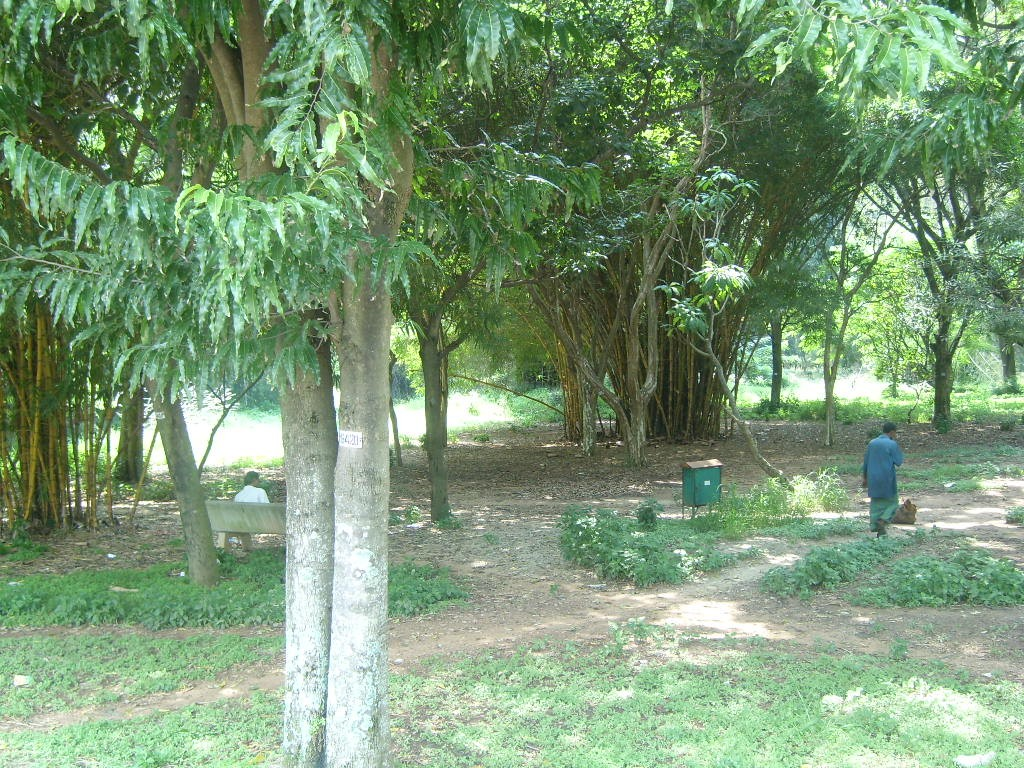
Bamboos and other trees in Cubbon Park

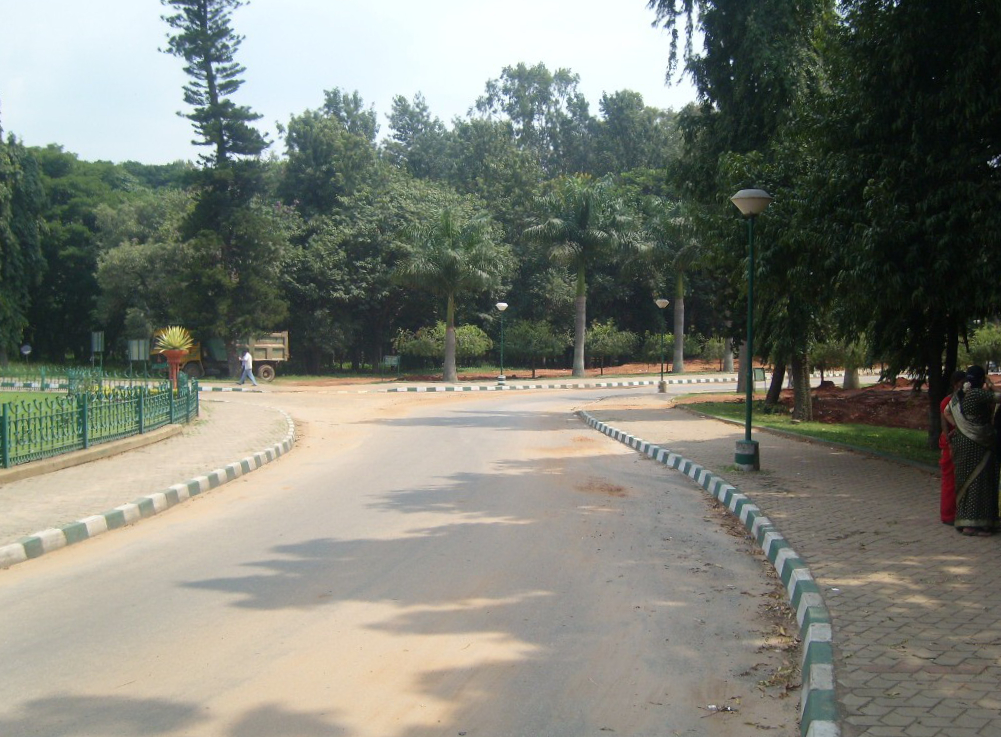
Avenues and road within the park

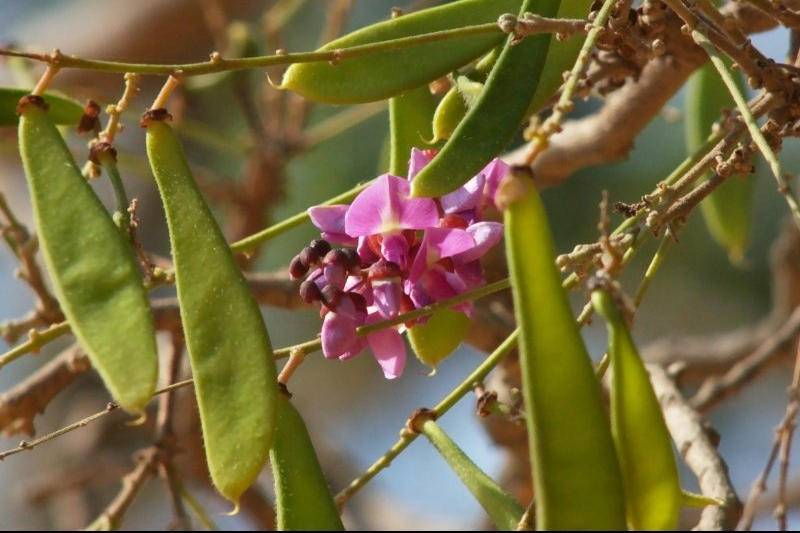
Peguensis/ovalifolia or Moulmein Rosewood tree

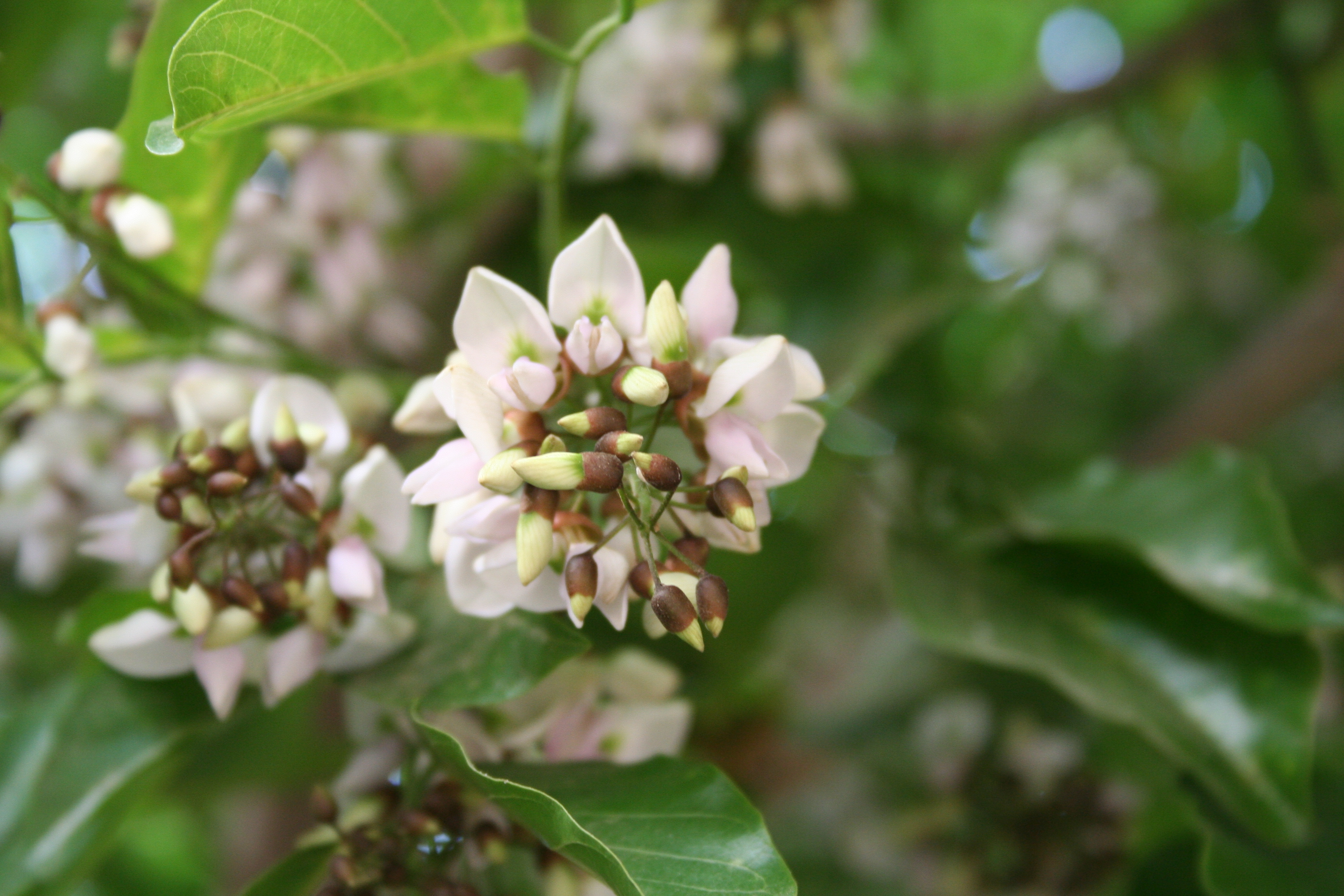
Pongam or Honge (Pongamia pinnata) planted as avenue trees

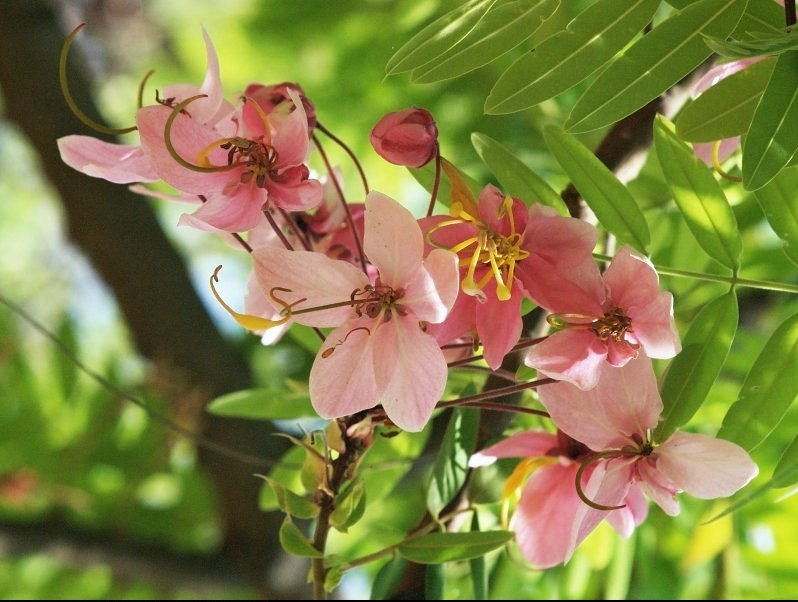
The Java Pink Cassia or Cassia javanica

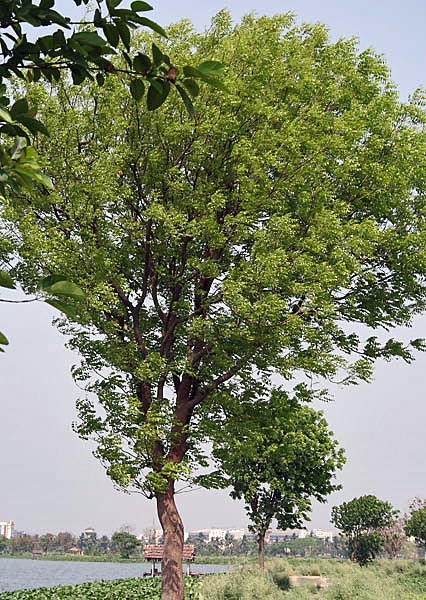
Spanish Mahogany tree found in Cubbon Park

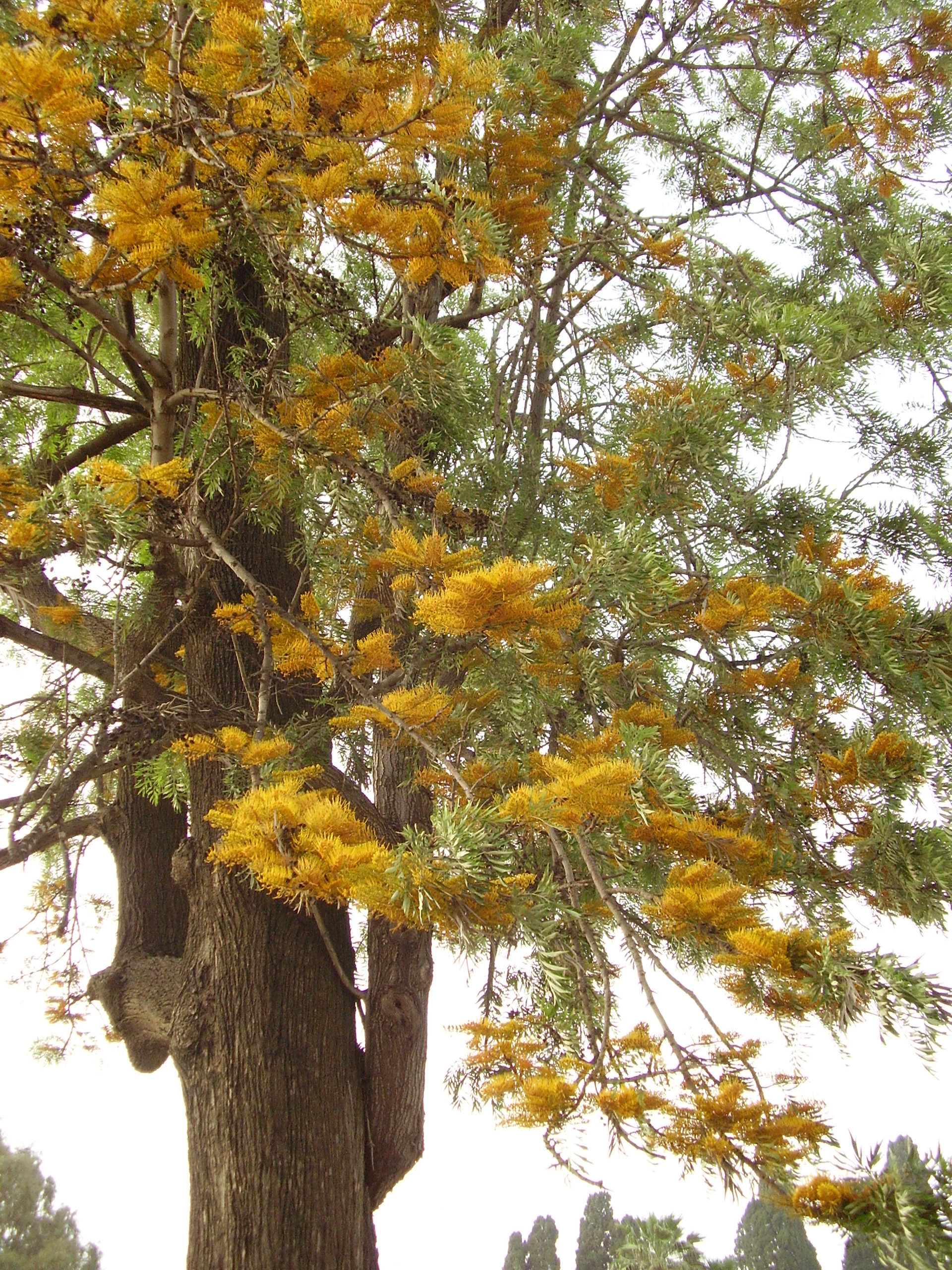
Grevillea robusta (silver oak)

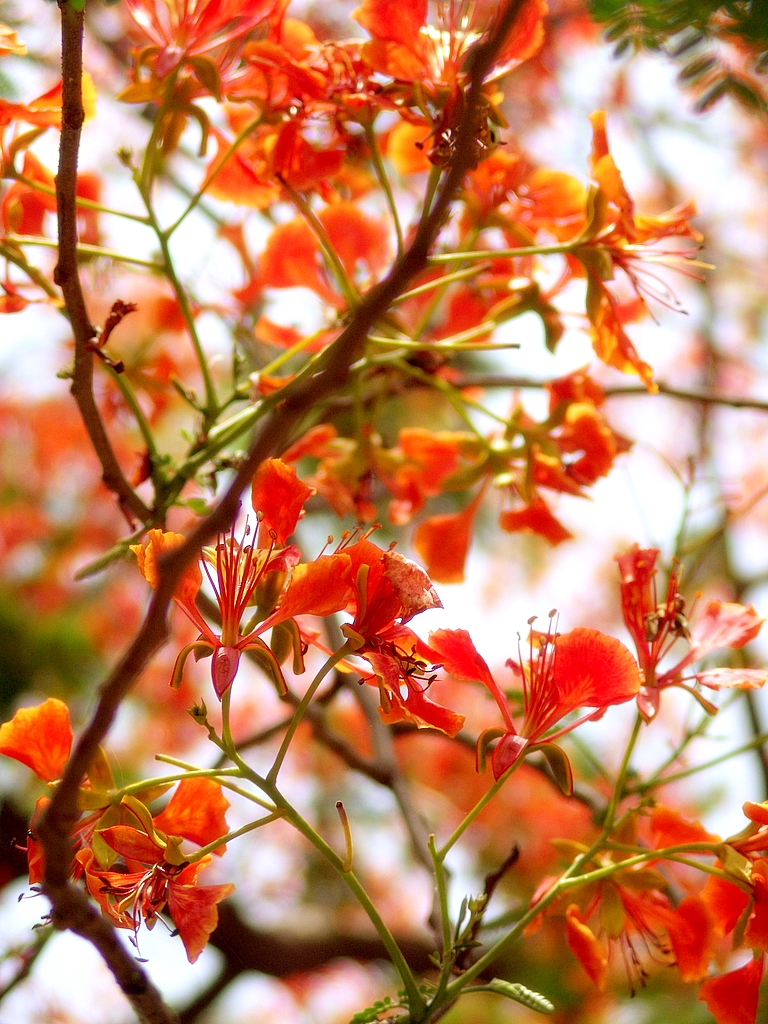
Gulmohar tree

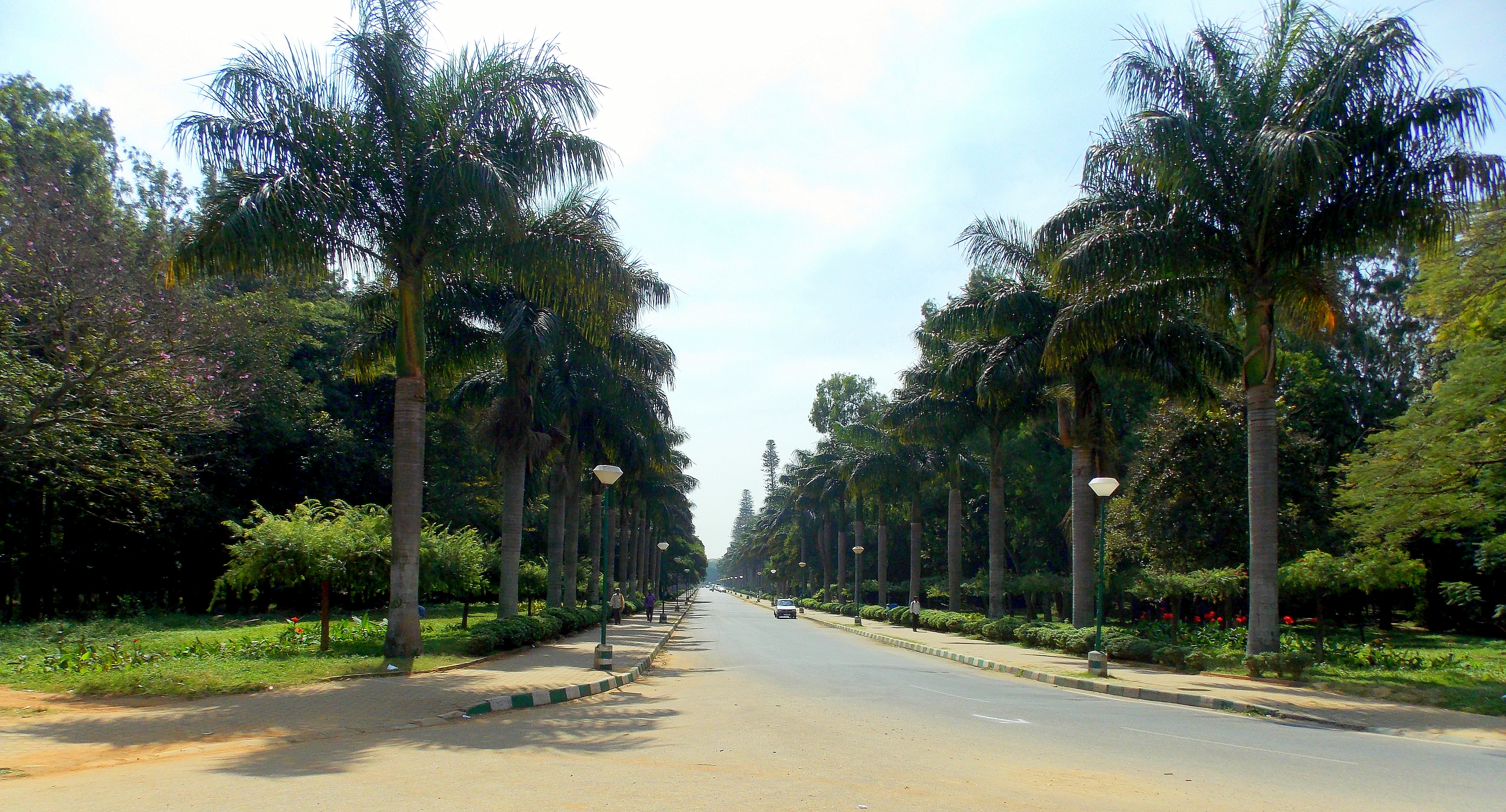
Cubbon Park Road

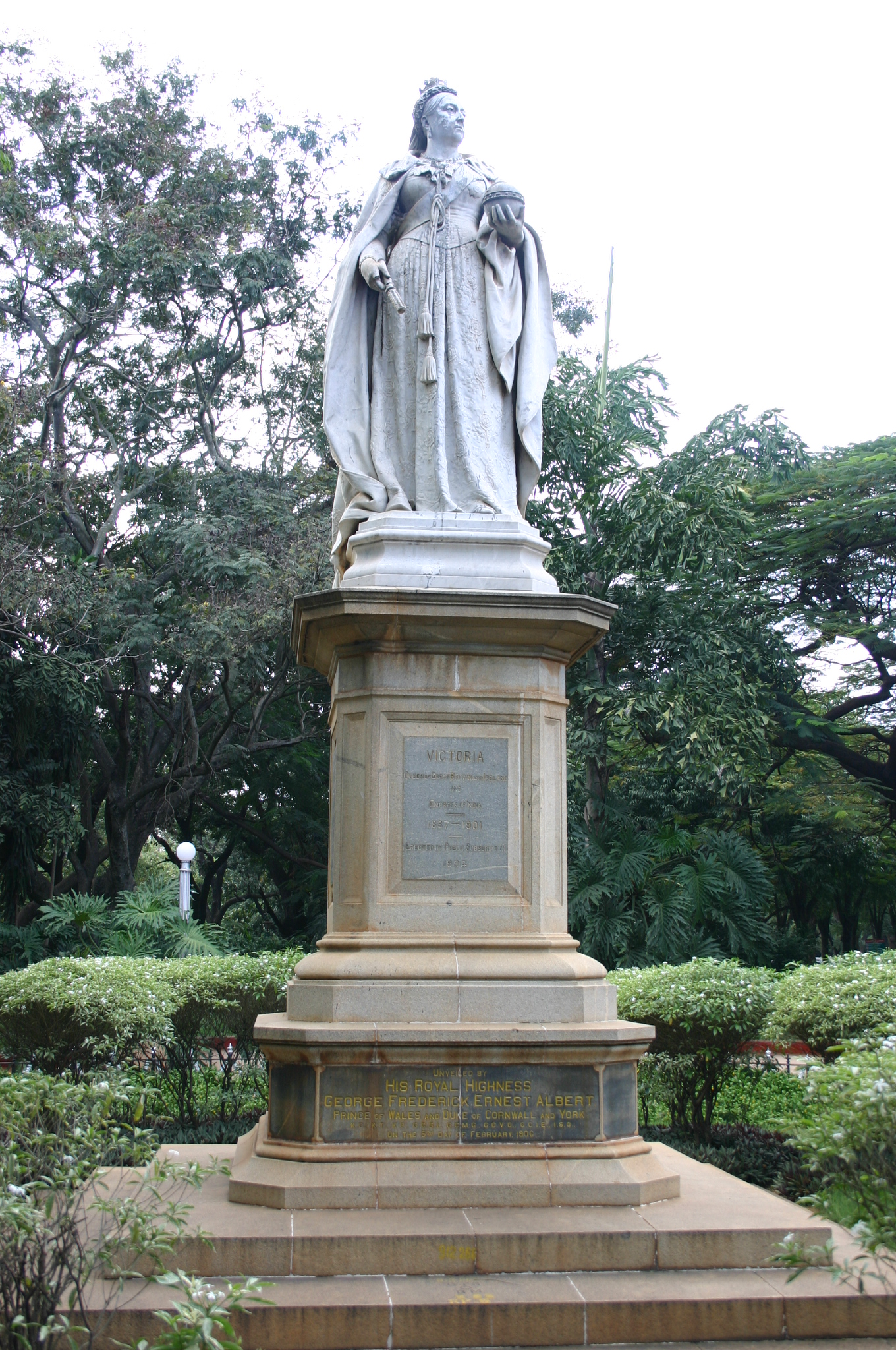
Statue of Queen Victoria, near Cubbon Park

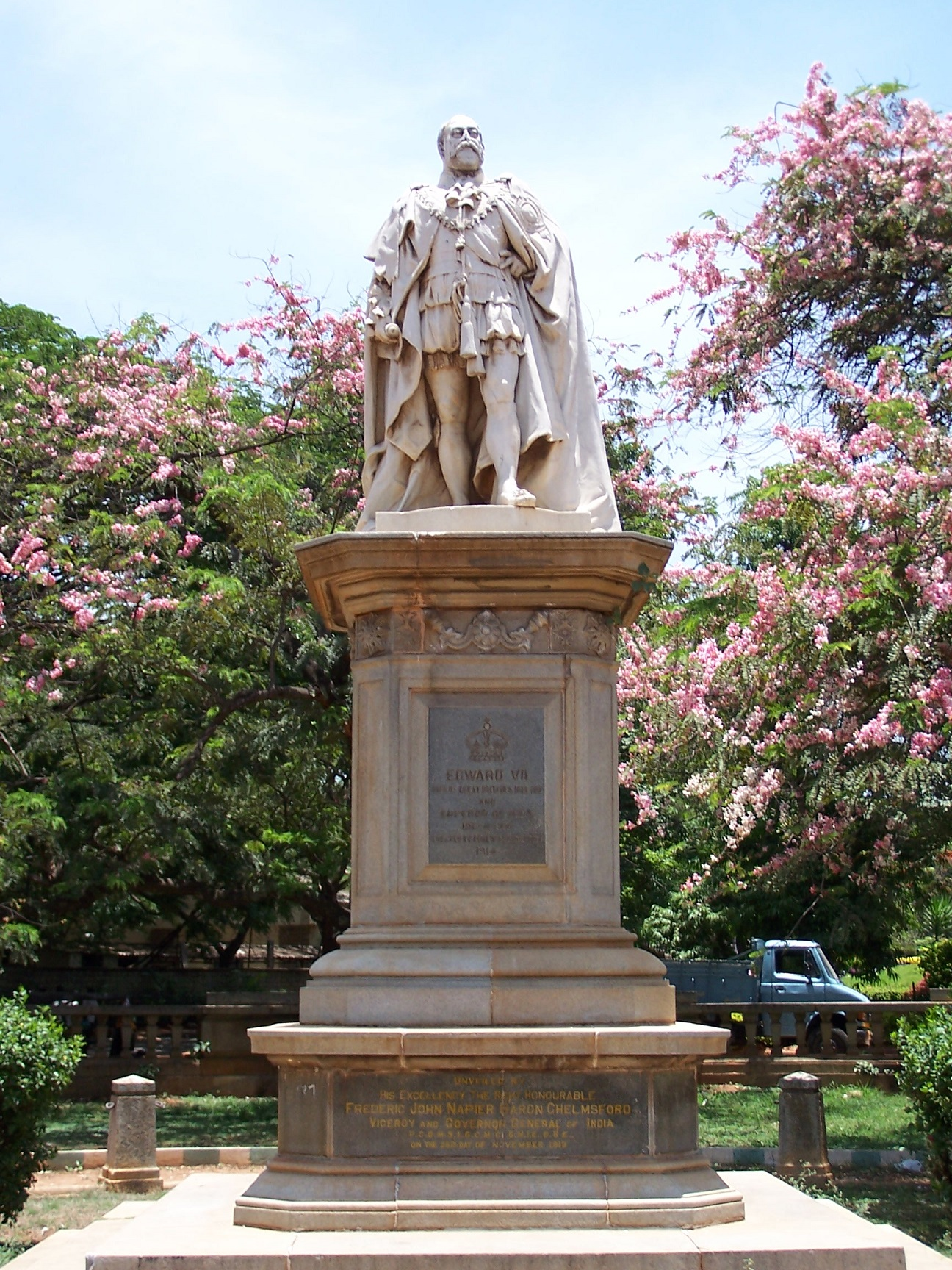
Statue of Edward VII, near Cubbon Park

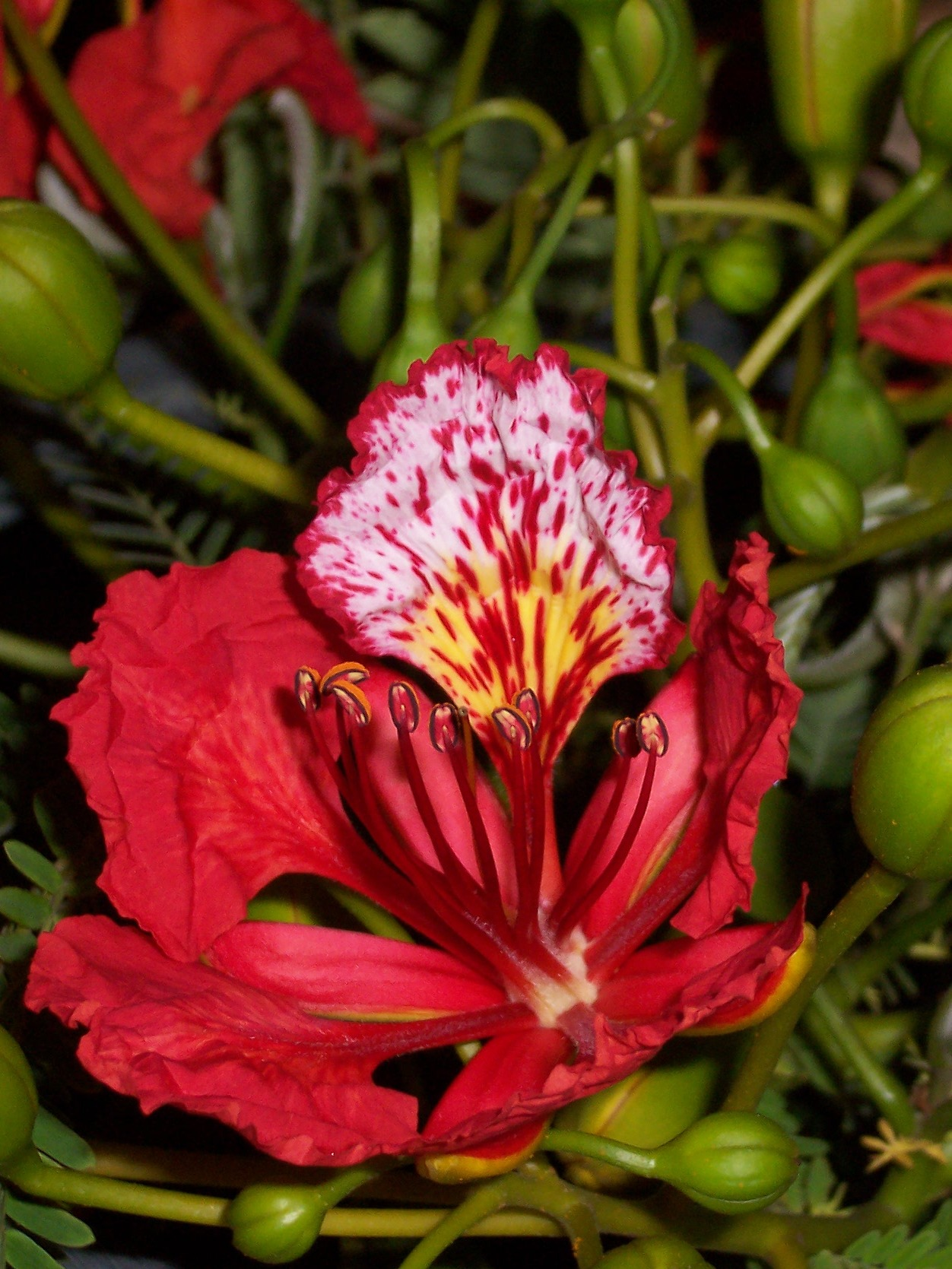
Delonix or ornamental Gulmohar flower seen in profusion in the Cubbon Park

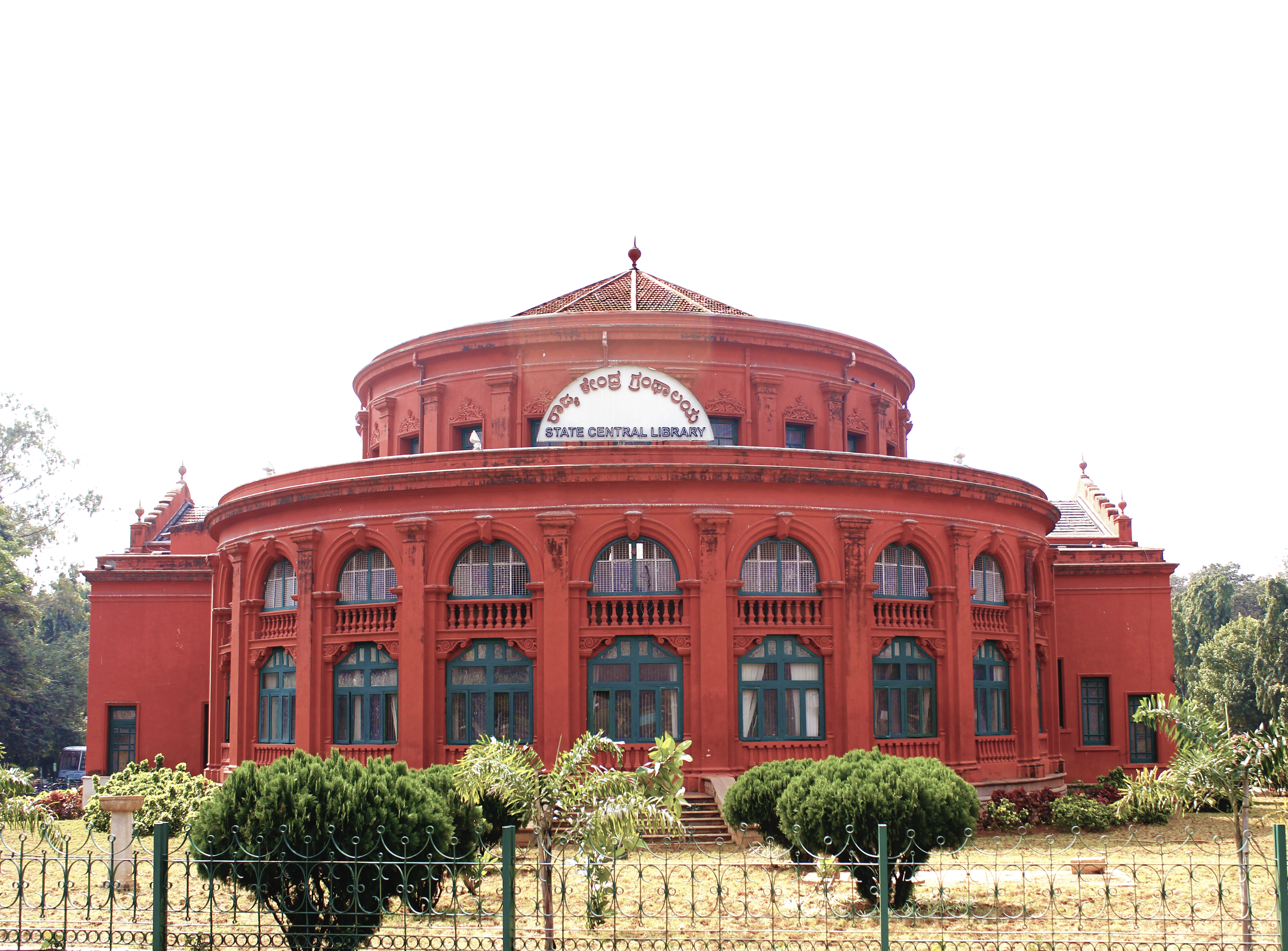
State Central Library or Sheshadri Memorial Hall
