= Mark Cubbon (East India Company officer) =

British army officer (1785–1861)

Sir Mark Cubbon
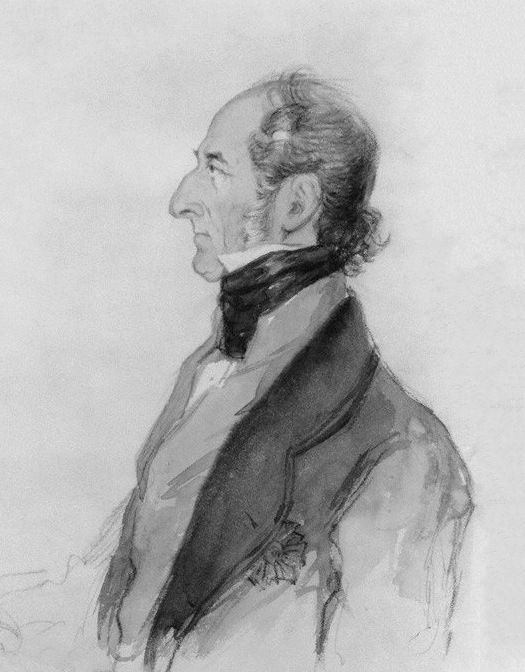
- Born: 23 August 1785; Maughold, Isle of Man
- Died: 23 April 1861 (aged 75); Suez, Egypt
- Military career
- Allegiance: United Kingdom of Great Britain and Ireland
- Branch: Honourable East India Company
- Service years: 1801–61
- Rank: Lieutenant-General by Brevet

Lieutenant-General Sir Mark Cubbon KCB (23 August 1785 – 23 April 1861) was a British army officer with the East India Company who was the Chief Commissioner of Mysore from 1834 to 1861. During his tenure, he established a law and order system, introduced judicial and economic reforms and through action in all spheres of governance helped develop the economy of Mysore. He resigned from his office in 1860 due to ill-health and left for England for the first time since his arrival in India as a cadet in 1800. The administration of the kingdom of Mysore under his leadership ensured that the 1857 rebellion had almost no impact in the region. He died in 1861 on board ship at Suez. Cubbon Road and Cubbon Park in Bangalore are named after him.

== Early life ==
Cubbon was born at the vicarage of Maughold, Isle of Man on 23 August 1785. His father was Vicar Thomas Cubbon and his mother Margaret Wilks was the sister of Colonel Mark Wilks. The seventh of ten children, he grew up enjoying scrambling up the local hills and studied at the local Parish school before studying under the tutorship of Maddrell of Ramsey. His uncle Mark Wilks arranged for Cubbon to enroll as a cadet in India in the spring of 1802.

== Early career in India ==
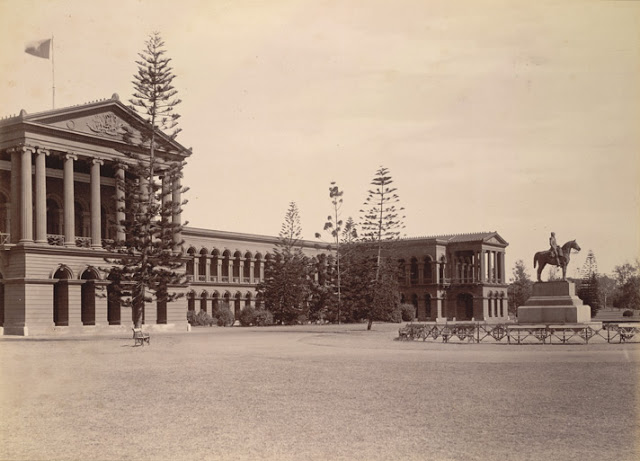
Public Offices, now the High Court, with an equestrian statue of Sir Mark Cubbon in Bangalore (1890)

Cubbon arrived in India earlier than required in the summer of 1801 at Calcutta. He gained an appointment to the 2nd Madras Battalion in 1802, and moved to the 2nd Battalion 5th Native Infantry in July 1804, serving in Travancore under Col. John Chalmers. Cubbon had great admiration for the Sepoys and respected their religious views. In 1809 he received a civil appointment but the new governor of Madras, George Barlow, had passed a pledge that was unpopular among the Europeans in the Madras Army. Cubbon refused to sign the declaration and he lost his appointment during this so-called white mutiny in Madras. He was reappointed in 1810 in the Commissariat Department initially under Col. Close in central India during the Pindari War and then under Colonel Philip Meadows Taylor in Kurnool. A year later, he was then made an Assistant Commissary-General, a position well above the ranks within the army. He became a Major on 23 November 1823 and was a Lieutenant-Colonel on 22 April 1826. In 1827 he moved south to serve under the Travancore Resident as Commissary-General, succeeding William Morrison.

== Mysore ==
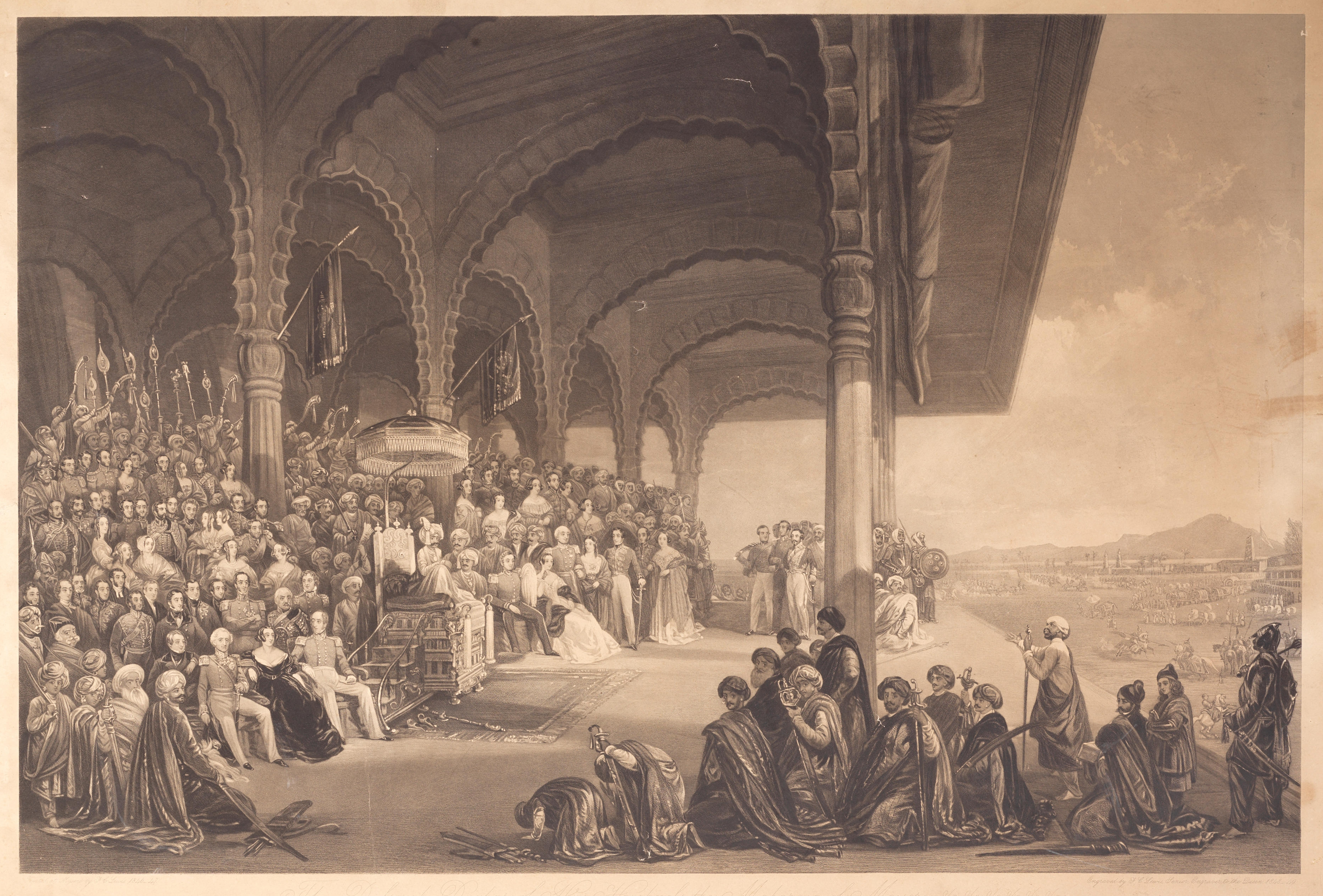
Engraving by F.C. Lewis (senior) showing the Dusserah Darbar of Krishnaraja Wadiyar III (c. 1850) and Cubbon seated to the right next to the steps leading to the throne. Next to him are Lady Montgomery and Hugh Gough.

After the death of Tipu Sultan in 1799's Fourth Anglo-Mysuru war, the British had restored the former Hindu royal family of Mysore under a child prince with Purnaiah, the minister during Tipu's rule, to effectively administer until the prince grew up. The revenue collection under this system was however considered unfair and corruption was widespread. This led to an uprising, the Nagar revolt in 1831, and the Rajah was unable to control it. This uprising was suppressed with the aid of the British and a commission was instituted to examine the causes. The commission which included Major-General Hawker, William Morison, John Macleod, and Mark Cubbon made a report which showed extreme misgovernance. A decision was taken by the Governor-General of India, William Bentinck for direct administration of the kingdom with two commissioners viz. J. Briggs & C.M. Lushington. The two however quarreled and this led to the appointment of a sole Commissioner, William Morrison, in May 1834 but on his transfer in June 1834, Cubbon was then made as Commissioner.

=== Administration and reforms ===
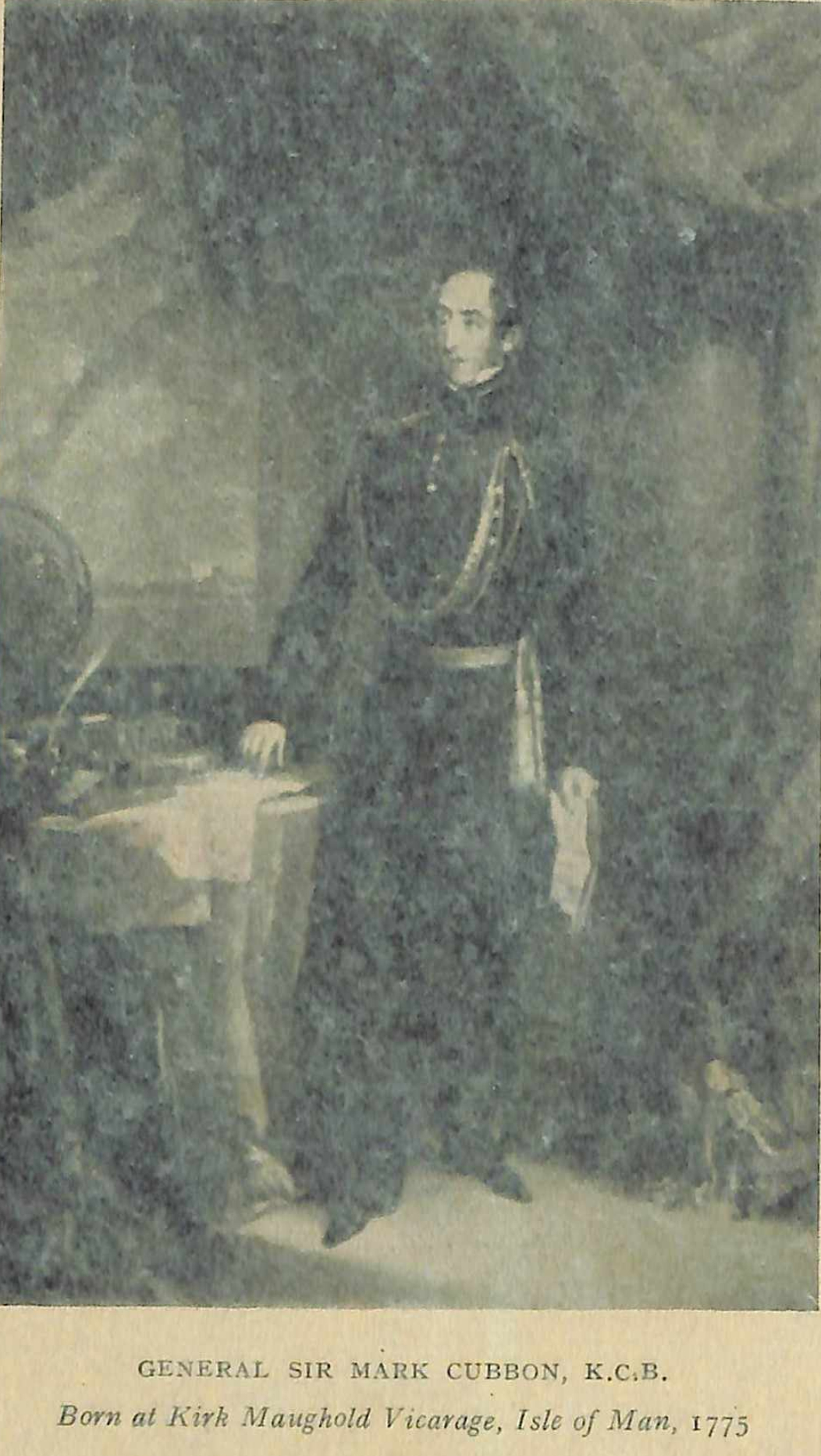

At the close of the 1831 uprising in Mysore, and the British takeover on 19 October 1831, the first priority for Cubbon was law and order. Prior to his actions, murders to settle disputes were extremely common in the towns and villages and Cubbon was disturbed by its apparent acceptance in society. Cubbon improved the system of Silladars or native horsemen who would provide services to the government for a fixed monthly charge. He raised their pay to ensure that they could not be corrupted and created a force of about 4000 horses with seven regiments, with a detachment for every taluk. There was no police force until July 1834, when a code or police hukumnama was formulated. This separated the local police from the military force. There was an armed and unarmed section with the armed part having the duty of dealing with prisoners, any field service needing them, killing tigers (with a reward of Rs 10 for adults and Rs 5 for cubs) and to accompany state guests or travellers. They would also prevent thefts, watch key positions and towns and prevent sandal trees from being cut. The unarmed peons or khalihaths (literally "empty hands") were to help in the repair of roads, irrigation tanks and follow other orders. He set up a reporting structure which was almost entirely made up of Indians. There was no code of law in 1834 and Cubbon drew upon and expanded a system described by his uncle Wilks in 1804. Cubbon created a judicial system that became quite popular but it was causing considerable demands on the system and in 1841 they made vexatious suitors liable to fines. Cubbon made himself the superior authority for handling serious crimes. In some cases he intervened and there were some cases where he conflicted with the decisions taken by the courts. The use of a uniform code of law across all classes was novel in the Kingdom of Mysore. Cubbon also reduced the powers of the poligars or local chieftains. They were paid a pension that was calculated on the basis of what it would take to maintain them in prison. There was considerable friction between communities belonging to different religions and castes. Cubbon resorted to the use of a majority vote to resolve several disputes relating to religious gurus.

Cubbon also made administration very strict and based on codes. Revenue officers taking bribes and a court officer holding extreme Wahhabi tenets were dismissed. He set up nine departments or kacheris:

- revenue (dewan)
- posts (anche)
- police (kandachar)
- public works (maramat)
- military (sowar and barr)
- medical
- public cattle (Amrit Mahal)
- judiciary
- public instruction

Prior to Cubbon, government documents were written in Urdu, Hindi, Persian, Kannada or Marathi and this led to difficulties and corruption. Cubbon restricted the languages to be used to Kannada and Marathi.

As part of financial reforms record keeping of all revenues collected was made stringent and all spending was controlled. Cubbon maintained public accounts using the Kantarayi pagoda (Kantirava Fanam) as the currency. This system was followed until 1854 and replaced by the East India Company currency in 1855.

Cubbon supported educational institutions run mainly by missionaries and also worked on healthcare, establishing hospitals and homes for lepers. He also issued rules against various forms of slavery that were traditionally followed in parts of Mysore. All forms of punishment, forced labour and torture in civil life were made illegal. The prison system was improved and convict labour was utilized in public works.

During the 1857 rebellion, Mysore was relatively peaceful owing to governance of Cubbon. A small band of Mohammedans in Srirangapatna were however planning rebellion and Cubbon had the uprising quashed secretly with the help of a small band of Coorg warriors. In reward for their actions, an exception in the Disarmament Act was made for Coorg.

Agriculture had been particularly hit by anarchy, with money lenders and revenue officials causing great trouble to farmers. Cubbon worked on the improvement of irrigation. These included the Marikanive project in Hiriyur, work on the Nugu, Shimsha (Maddur), Hemavathi (near Sakleshpur), Tunga & Bhadra (near Shimoga) and Kaveri river project near Siddapur. He founded the agri-horticultural society in 1839 and had the Lalbagh gardens transferred to it. In 1836 he wrote that "great public benefit may be expected to arise from this institution, not only in regard to objects merely horticultural and the extension of botanical knowledge, but in the promotion of the agricultural interest of the country, by introductions suited to the climate, amongst which may be enumerated varieties of sugar-cane, cotton, and tobacco far superior to any produced in Mysore, and by affording the people the means of obtaining gratuitous instruction in improved modes of cultivation." Cubbon introduced new crops, varieties of crops, new breeds of livestock (apart from maintaining traditional breeds like the Amrit Mahal that had helped Hyder Ali and Tipu Sultan win battles) and also took an interest in forestry. In 1846 sisoo plantations were tried and in 1855-56 teak was planted in Lakwalli on the banks of the Tunga and Bhadra. He issued an order to ensure that valuable woods could not be cut without government permission. He also issued orders against kumri or slash-and-burn agriculture.

He also worked towards improving the road system with four classes of roads and oversaw the building of bridges at key points such as at Fraserpert, Maddur, Hoskote, Shimoga and Hiriyur. The road system also required key passes through the Western Ghats and for this he opened up passes at Agumbe, Boond, Sampaje and Periambadi.

Cubbon maintained traditional religious institutions and granted concessions to maths, temples, old age homes and other institutions that were supported by the maharaja.

Cubbon made full use of natives in administration and reduced the need for European appointments. From 1834 there was a single commissioner for Mysore; in 1836 he was given charge of Coorg and from 1843 was also to act as Resident for Mysore without any increase in his own salary. Cubbon's administration is estimated to have costed only about £13000 a year and required only four Europeans. Edward Washburn Hopkins wrote in 1901 that one of the solutions to India's famines was to cubbonize its administration (i.e. to use native government).

He was knighted K.C.B. in 1856.

In 1859, when orders were issued to transfer the superintendence of Mysore affairs from the Governor-General to the government of Madras, Cubbon submitted his resignation, as he held it to be impolitic and contrary to the declaration made by the Honourable Court of Directors in 1838. The order was withdrawn by the Viceroy, Lord Canning. At the beginning of the next year, however, Cubbon felt compelled to resign owing to ill-health.

=== Contribution to Kannada ===
Mark Cubbon took special interest and financially supported the publication of the first Canarese (Kannada) translation of the Bhagavad Gita, The Bhagavat-Geeta, Or, Dialogues of Krishna and Arjun in Eighteen Lectures, with Sanskrit, Canarese and English in parallel columns, edited by Rev. John Garrett, published by the Wesleyan Mission Press, Bangalore in 1849.

Mark Cubbon also financially supported the printing and publication of the first Canarese - English dictionary, which was compiled by William Reeve, edited by Daniel Sanderson and published in 1858, by the Wesleyan Mission Press.

== Personality ==
Cubbon grew up in India with a deep understanding for native sentiment and empathy for the people and their traditions. He was considered very fair and was tactful, making use of a native style of argumentation when required. In his dealings with the Mysore king, he outright avoided the use of espionage to obtain information, a method used by many others in the past. He was required in his work to host public dinners but did not relish parties and especially disliked dance balls. Fond of horses, he maintained as many as sixty in his stables. He did not visit church and made jokes on the inconsistencies of religious professors but he enforced the closure of all offices on Sundays. Cubbon was unmarried.

Cubbon built a summer home on the summit of Nandidroog in 1834. Lady Canning left a memoir of a visit (after 1856):

I am visiting a charming old General, Sir Mark Cubbon, 1,500 feet above the table-land of Bangalore, and with a view over about 150 miles of country on all sides. It is cool fresh air and a very pleasant spot, and the old gentleman is very delightful. He has been all this century in India, but seems to know all that has gone on all over the world, and is the most grand siegneur old man I almost ever saw." (The Story of Two Noble Lives, by A. J. C. Hare)

== Death and legacy ==
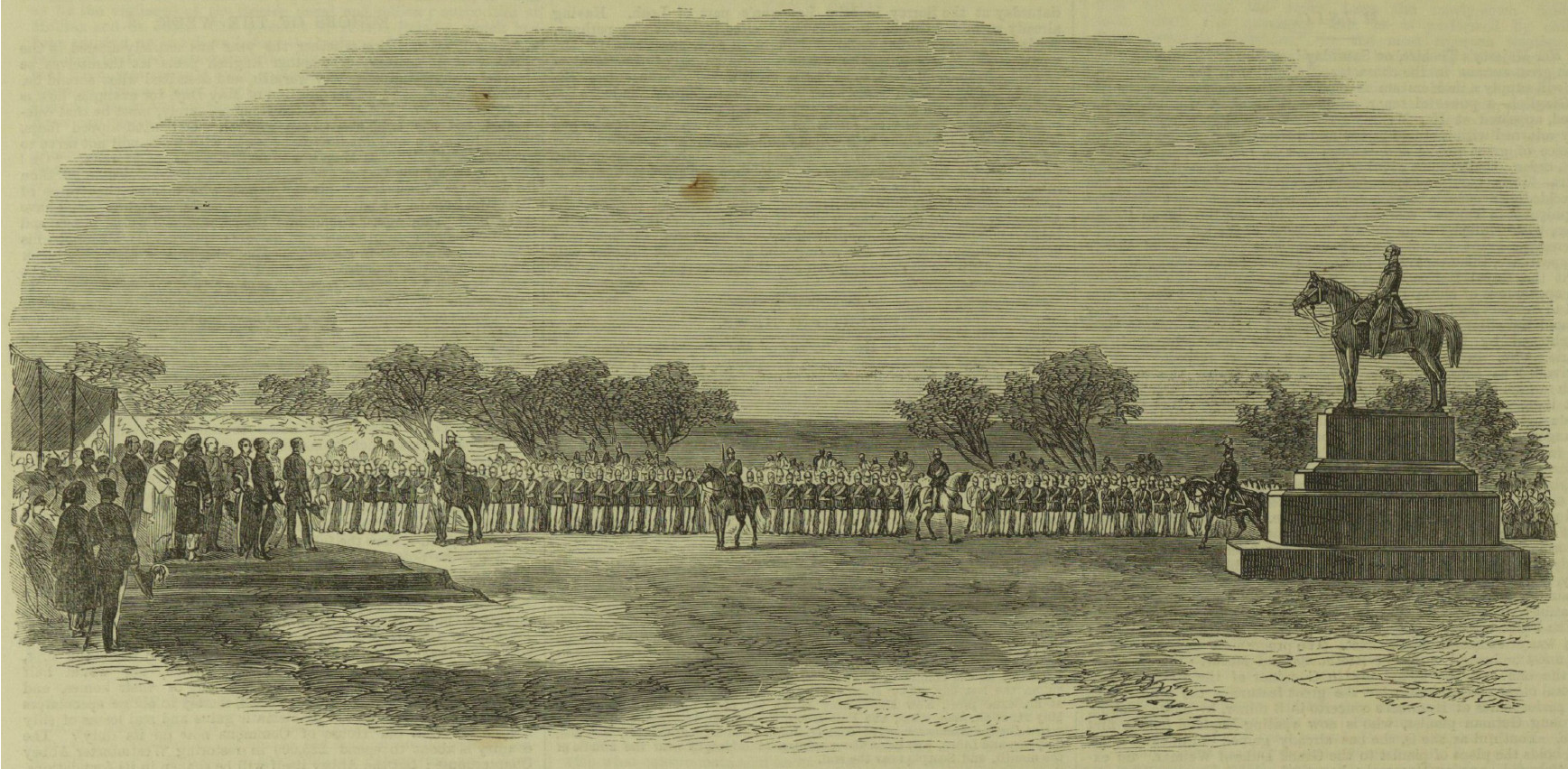
Inauguration of the statue on the parade grounds

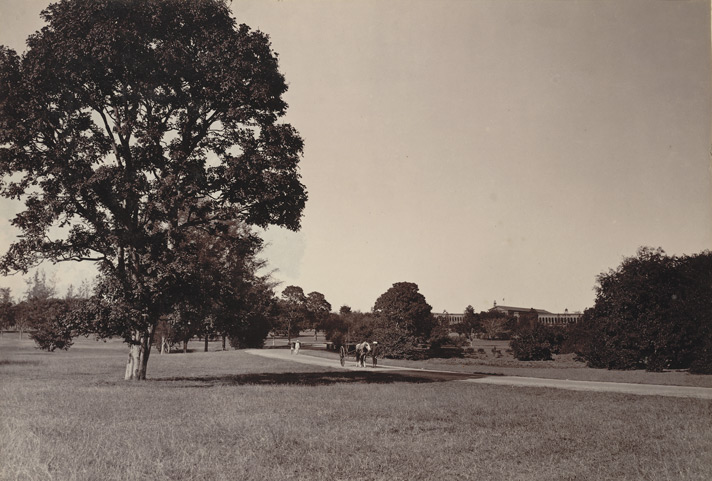
Cubbon Park (1890)

Cubbon died at Suez on 23 April 1861 while returning to England in the company of his physician, Dr. Campbell. He died of liver ailment or possibly an abscess in the lungs, his last words being recorded as "And through no merit of my own." From Southampton, Campbell was joined by Haines and Colonel Macqueen who took the body to Liverpool and then to Douglas. All flags were flown at half mast and on 17 May his body was interred in the Maughold Churchyard amid a large gathering. The Archdeacon announced, "In that vault lies the greatest man this island has produced for centuries back." When news of his death reached Mysore, all public offices were closed for three days.

An equestrian statue by Baron Marochetti was unveiled on 16 March 1866 in a large gathering and addressed by Lewin Bentham Bowring, Cubbon's successor as Commissioner of Mysore. The statue was initially placed in the parade ground at Bangalore but moved later in front of the main government buildings (the Attara Kacheri now housing the Karnataka High Court). When the statue was unveiled the forehead was marked with the three lines of ash, symbols of Brahminism, a prank by some young soldiers that was referred to in "The Painting of the Statue" in the "Lays of Ind" by W.S. Yeldham writing under the pen name of "Aliph Cheem". Cubbon Road, Cubbonpet and Cubbon Park in Bangalore are named after him. A medallion portrait of Cubbon is found on the ceiling at the west end of the Central Hall in the Karnataka High Court building.

Largely ignored since Indian Independence in 1947, the statue of Mark Cubbon was garlanded for the first time at a celebration of Cubbon's 228th birth anniversary on 23 August 2013. The function required special permission from the Karnataka High Court, and police protection was provided. This celebration was however opposed by Vatal Nagaraj who considered it a shame that British statues were still standing in public spaces suggesting that they be moved into museums. On 28 June 2020, the statue was moved from the High Court premises to Cubbon Park.

== See also ==
- Administration of the kingdom of Mysore
