= List of areas in Bengaluru Pete =

This is a list of areas in Bengaluru Pete, a 2.24 km^{2} market area in Bengaluru, India. Bengaluru Pete was established by Kempegowda I in the 16th century, with different areas in the Pete named after the respective trade activities that took place or the communities that lived here. Earlier, the two main areas were Chikkapete and Doddapete, running from west to east and north to south respectively. Today, the areas are arranged as follows.

Main area names	Named After	Sub-area names	Named After
Binnipete	Binny and Co.	-	-
Chamarajpete	Chamarajendra Wadiyar X	-	-
Chikkapete	Retail market	Akkipete	Rice merchants
Chikkapete	Retail market	Anchepete	Post Office
Chikkapete	Retail market	Balepete	Bangle and musical instrument vendors
Chikkapete	Retail market	Mamulpete	General traders
Chikkapete	Retail market	Patnoolpete	Silk Weavers
Chikkapete	Retail market	Santhusapete	Artisans
Chikkapete	Retail market	Sourashtrapete	Merchants of Sourashtra community
Chikkapete	Retail market	Tharagupete	Grain merchants
Chikkapete	Retail market	Upparpete	Salt merchants
Cottonpete	Cotton market	-	-
Nagarathpete	Gold, silver and textile traders	Aralepete (Cubbonpete)	Textile merchants of Devanga community
Nagarathpete	Gold, silver and textile traders	Ballapurapete	Weavers of Doddaballapura
Nagarathpete	Gold, silver and textile traders	Doddapete (Avenue Road)	Wholesale market
Nagarathpete	Gold, silver and textile traders	Ganigarapete	Oil merchants of Ganiga community
Nagarathpete	Gold, silver and textile traders	Gollarapete	Cowherds of Golla community
Nagarathpete	Gold, silver and textile traders	Huriopete	Cord market
Nagarathpete	Gold, silver and textile traders	Halasurpete	Jackfruit Orchids
Nagarathpete	Gold, silver and textile traders	Kumbarpete	Clay pot traders of Kumbar community
Nagarathpete	Gold, silver and textile traders	Kurubarapete	Shepherds of Kuruba community
Nagarathpete	Gold, silver and textile traders	Ragipete	Ragi merchants
Nagarathpete	Gold, silver and textile traders	Sunnakalpete	Limestone traders
Nagarathpete	Gold, silver and textile traders	Thigalarpete	Garden flower vendors
Sultanpete	Paper product vendors	Manavarthipete	Labours
Sultanpete	Paper product vendors	Muthyalapete	Pearl traders
Sultanpete	Paper product vendors	Ranasinghpete	Rana Sanga
New Tharagupete	An extension of Tharagupete, Grain merchants neighbourhood	-	-

== See also ==
- Peths in Pune
