= Kempe Gowda I =

Founder of Bangalore (1510–1569)

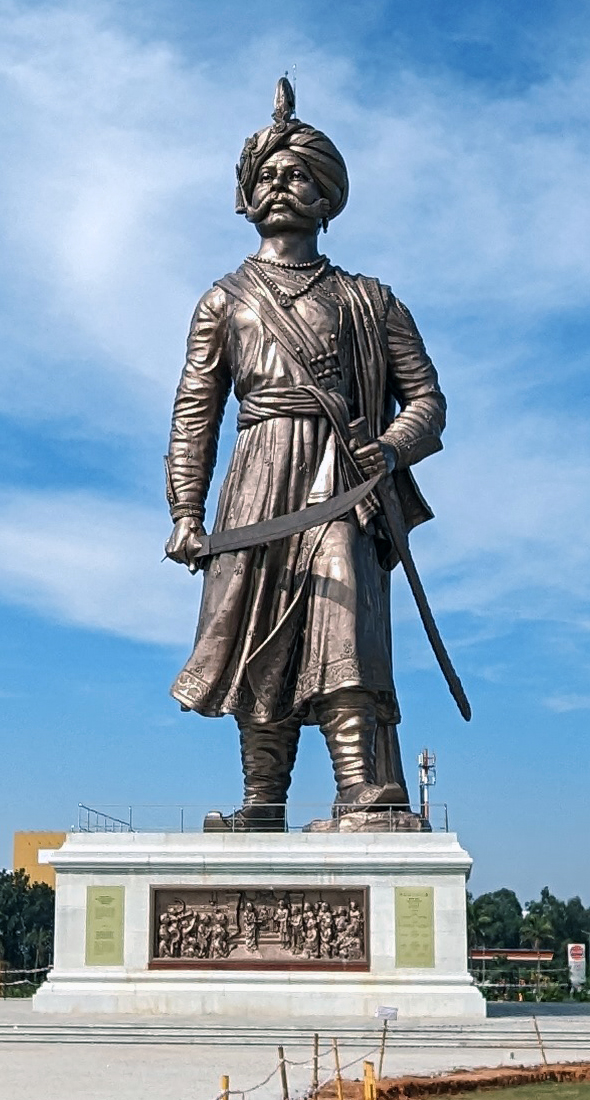
- 108-foot tall statue of Kempegowda near Kempegowda International Airport
- Born: Hiriya Kempegowda; 27 June 1510; Yelahanka, Vijayanagara Empire (modern day Bengaluru, Karnataka, India)
- Died: 1569 (aged 58–59); Bengaluru, Vijayanagara Empire (modern day Karnataka, India)
- Resting place: Kempapura, Magadi, Ramanagara District; 13.0146°N 77.08149°E
- Other names: Nadaprabhu Kempe Gowda, Kempe Gowda
- Known for: Fortifier of Bengaluru
- Predecessor: Kempananje Gowda
- Successor: Gidde Gowda
- Children: Gidde Gowda
- Parent(s): Kempananje Gowda, Lingamma

Kempe Gowda I (27 June 1510 – 1569) locally venerated as Nadaprabhu Kempe Gowda, or commonly known as Kempe Gowda, was a governor under the Vijayanagara Empire in early-modern India. He is famous for the development of Bengaluru Pete in the 16th century. Kempegowda erected many Kannada inscriptions across the region.

== Early life ==
Hiriya Kempe Gowda (Hiriya meaning elder in Kannada) was born in the Yelahanka suburb of Bangalore in the Morasu Vokkaliga community to Kempananje Gowda, the ruler of Yelhanka for more than 70 years. The Morasu Vokkaligas were Vijayanagara vassals at Yelahanka.

Kempe Gowda, who is reputed to have shown leadership skills during his childhood, was educated for nine years at a gurukula in Aivarukandapura (or Aigondapura), a village near Hesaraghatta.

== Reign ==
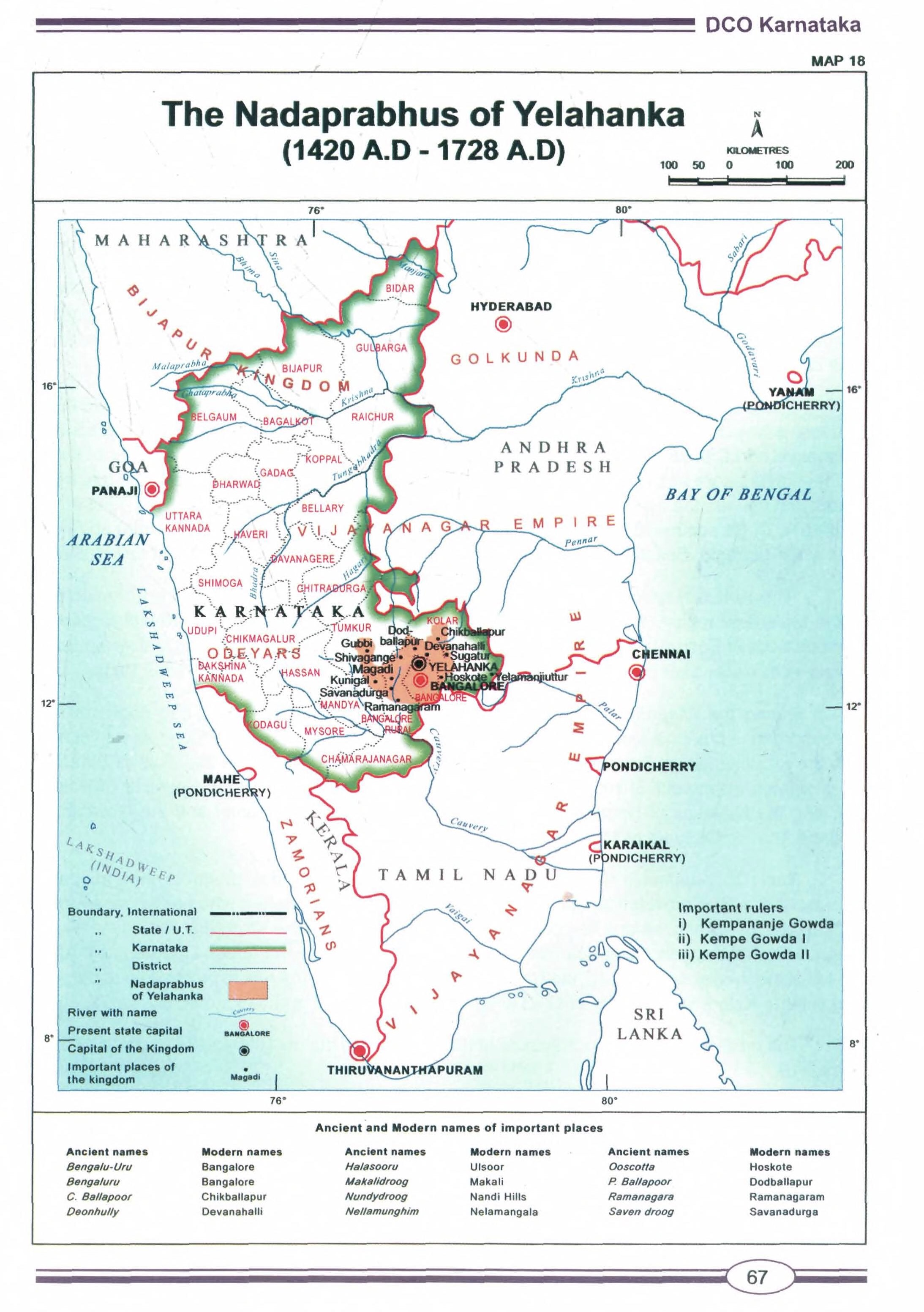
Map of The Nadaprabhus of Yelahanka

Fourth in succession from Rana Bhairave Gowda, founder of the dynasty of the Avati Nadu and great grandson of Jaya Gowda, a separate Vijayanagara feudal vassal, Kempe Gowda is the most famous of the Yelahanka rulers. Kempe Gowda assumed the chieftaincy of Yalahanka Nadu from his father in 1513 and would reign for 46 years.

=== Construction of Bengaluru ===
It is believed that Kempe Gowda envisioned a town out of vast woodlands and plateaus during a hunting expedition when he ventured from Yelahanka towards the Shivanasamudra with his courtier Veeranna and eldest son Gidde Gowda.

In 1526, Kempe Gowda conquered the Sivagange principality (not to be confused with Sivaganga in Tamil Nadu), 48 kilometres (30 mi) from Bangalore on the Bangalore-Pune Highway. He then annexed Domlur (a present-day suburb on the road from Bangalore to the old Bangalore airport). Within this vast forest area, and with imperial permission of the Vijayanagar Emperor Achyutharaya (an inscription at Dasarahalli records the decree date as 1532), he built Bangalore Fort and the town in 1537, and moved his capital from Yelahanka to the new Bengaluru Pete, the foundation of present-day Bangalore city.

Fearing Kempe Gowda's rise in power at Penukonda, Jagadevaraya, a neighbouring poleygar at Channapattana, lodged a complaint Emperor Sadashiva Raya. Kempe Gowda's territories were confiscated and he was imprisoned for five years. After being released, he was returned his territories. Over the following years, however, pleased with his activities, the Emperor would bestow Kempe Gowda the nearby villages of Ulsoor, Begur, Varthur, Jigani, Thalagattapura, Kumbalgodu, Kengeri, and Banavara.

==== Bangalore fort ====
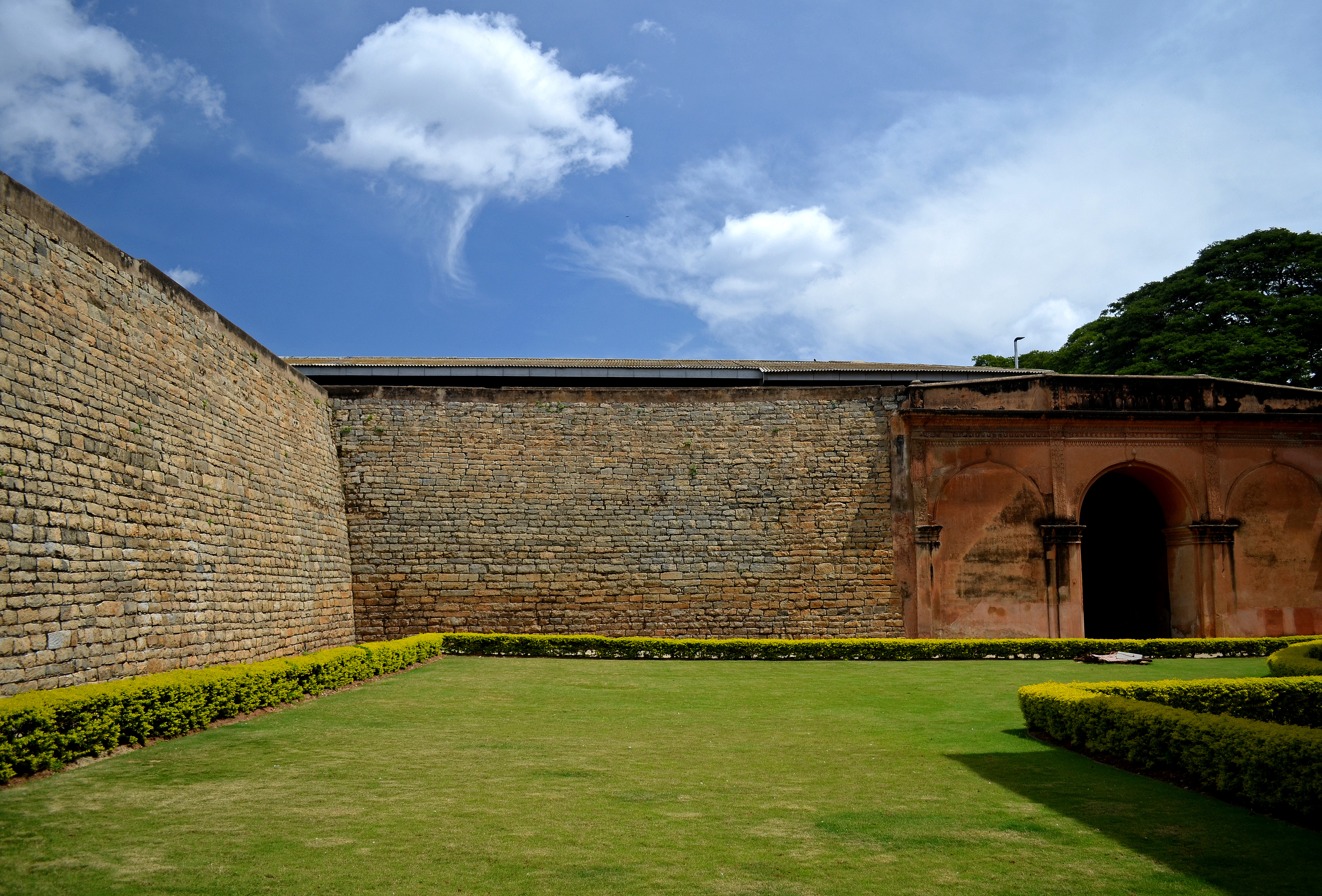
A view of Bangalore Fort

Kempe Gowda built a red fort with eight gates and a moat surrounding it. Inside the fort two wide roads ran from North to South and East to West. The other roads were made parallel or perpendicular to them. On an auspicious moment fixed by an astrologer, Kempe Gowda harnessed the bullocks to the ploughs at the central Doddapete square, at the junction of Doddapete (Avenue Road) and Chikka pete, got the ground ploughed and worked the four main streets running in four directions. One ran from Halasoor (Ulsoor) Gate to Sondekoppa Road from East to West, and another from Yelahanka Gate to the Fort running from North to South. These roads are the present Nagarthapete and Chikka pete; and Doddapete respectively. The streets and the Blocks were demarcated for the purpose they were meant, like for business or residences etc. Streets of Doddapete, Chikkapete, Nagartha-pete were for marketing of general merchandise; Aralepete (Cotton pet), Tharagupete, Akki pete, Ragipete, Balepete etc. were for marketing of commodities like cotton, grain, rice, ragi, and bangles respectively: kurubarapete, Kumbara-pete, Ganigarapete, Upparapete etc. were for trades and crafts, and residences of Kuruba, Kumbara, Ganiga, Uppara castes respectively and similar petes' (Blocks). Halasoorpete, Manava-rthepete, Mutyalapete (Ballapurapete) etc. were meant for other groups of the society. The Agraharas were for the priests and learned classes. He got skilled artisans and craftsmen from the neighboring as well as far off places and got them settled so that they could pursue their vocations.

Temples of Vinayaka and Anjaneya were built at the Northern Yelahanka Gate of the fort (near the present head office of State Bank of Mysore). Dodda Basavannanagudi (The Bull Temple) and in its neighbourhood, Dodda Vinayaka and Dodda Anjaneya and Veerabhadhra temples were also built outside the fort on the southern side. Gavi Gangadhareshwara temple was also built by Kempe Gowda. Kempe Gowda I encouraged the construction of temples and lakes and planned residential layouts, or agraharams, around each temple. The construction of the mud fort and several temples and lakes transformed Bangalore from a sleepy village to a centre of culture based on vedic traditions.

Tanks were built for the water supply to the town, to the moat around the fort and for the irrigation of crops. Inside the fort, a big pond enclosed by masonry of dressed granite stones was dug and built (on the South-Western corner of the present Sri Krishnarajendra Market). Dhar-mambudhi tank, which supplied water to the town (present Subhash Nagar, BMTC bus stand and KSRTC bus stands, in front of the city Railway Station), Kempambudhi tank (named after Ranabhaire Gowda's family Goddess, Doddamma or Kempamma), in Gavi-pura Guttahalli and Samp-igambudhi tank (named after one of the daughters-in-law: present Sree Kanteerava Stadium), which were meant for irrigation, were also built. Irrigational facilities gave much impetus to agriculture and horticulture and also encouraged laying of gardens and raising groves of fruit crops.

== Death and succession ==
Kempe Gowda died in 1569 having ruled for about 46 years. The 16th century Kannada epitaph on his tomb proclaims that he died on the spot at Kempapura, a village in Magadi, while returning from Kunigal, reportedly after settling a dispute.

Kempe Gowda's tomb was accidentally found on 7 March 2015 by Prashanth Marur, a college official-turned-historian, while he was driving by Kempapura. It was also authenticated by group of historians who visited the tomb. It is believed that his son Kempe Gowda II built the tomb after his father's demise. After confirmation, Marur wrote an article that was published inVijayavani on 3 September 2015.

=== Succession ===
According to some literary sources, Kempe Gowda's elder son Gidde Gowda succeeded him and his lineage lasted for a century in Magadi, where they built numerous temples, forts, and tanks.

The Nelapattana subterranean town was built on the strategic foothills of the Savandurga to protect its city dwellers from neighbouring invasions. However, in 1728, Haider Ali, the commander-in-chief (dalvoy) of the Kingdom of Mysore, defeated the ruler from Kempe Gowda's lineage and annexed the principality into the kingdom. The last Gowda ruler was imprisoned in Srirangapatana till his death. The family members were moved to Hulikal village in Magadi. Some other family members were pensioned by Dewan Purnaiah by gifting them jagirs, or land grants, at Hosur in present-day Tamil Nadu, where the lineage continues as farmers.

== Legacy ==
=== Social reforms ===
Kempe Gowda is also noted for his societal reforms and contribution to building temples and water reservoirs in Bengaluru. While ruling, one of his social reforms was to prohibit the custom of amputating the last two fingers of the left hand of unmarried women during "bandi devaru", a late custom in the Morasu Vokkaliga community.

=== Contributions ===
Kempe Gowda was a patron of arts and learning. Despite hailing from a Kannada speaking community, he was multilingual and authored Gangagaurivilasa, a yakshagana play, in Telugu.

=== Memorials ===
A metal statue of Kempe Gowda was posthumously installed in 1609 at Gangadhareshwara temple at Shivagange.

In 1964, another statue was erected in front of the Corporation Office at Bengaluru.

The city bus stand of Bengaluru is named Kempegowda Bus Station in his honour. Bangalore International Airport was also renamed Kempegowda International Airport on 14 December 2013.

The Bangalore Development Authority developed the Nadaprabhu Kempegowda Layout in his memory. The Majestic metro station on the Purple Line of Bangalore Metro was also renamed Nadaprabhu Kempegowda Station., Majestic, in his honour.

Educational institutions such as Kempegowda Institute of Medical Sciences, Kempegowda Institute of Physiotherapy, Kempegowda College of Nursing, and Kempegowda Residential PU College have all been named after Kempe Gowda. A police station and a park in Bangalore are named in his honour. A busy thoroughfare in the city is named Kempegowda Road.

Since 2017, the Government of Karnataka has recognised Kempe Gowda's birth anniversary, or Kempe Gowda Jayanthi. The Kempegowda Award, a civic award presented annually by the BBMP, was set up in his memory.

On 27 June 2020, commemorating Kempe Gowda's 511th birth anniversary, work on a 108-feet tall Kempe Gowda Statue and a 23-acre central park around the statue formally began with its inauguration by Chief Minister B. S.Yediyurappa at the Kempegowda International Airport. The same was inaugurated by Prime Minister Narendra Modi on 11 November 2022.

== Media gallery ==
A metal statue of Kempe Gowda

Kempe Gowda statue at Vidhana Soudha (2026)

Kempe Gowda statue on occasion of Shardiya Navratri at Shri Bande Mahakali Temple (2026)

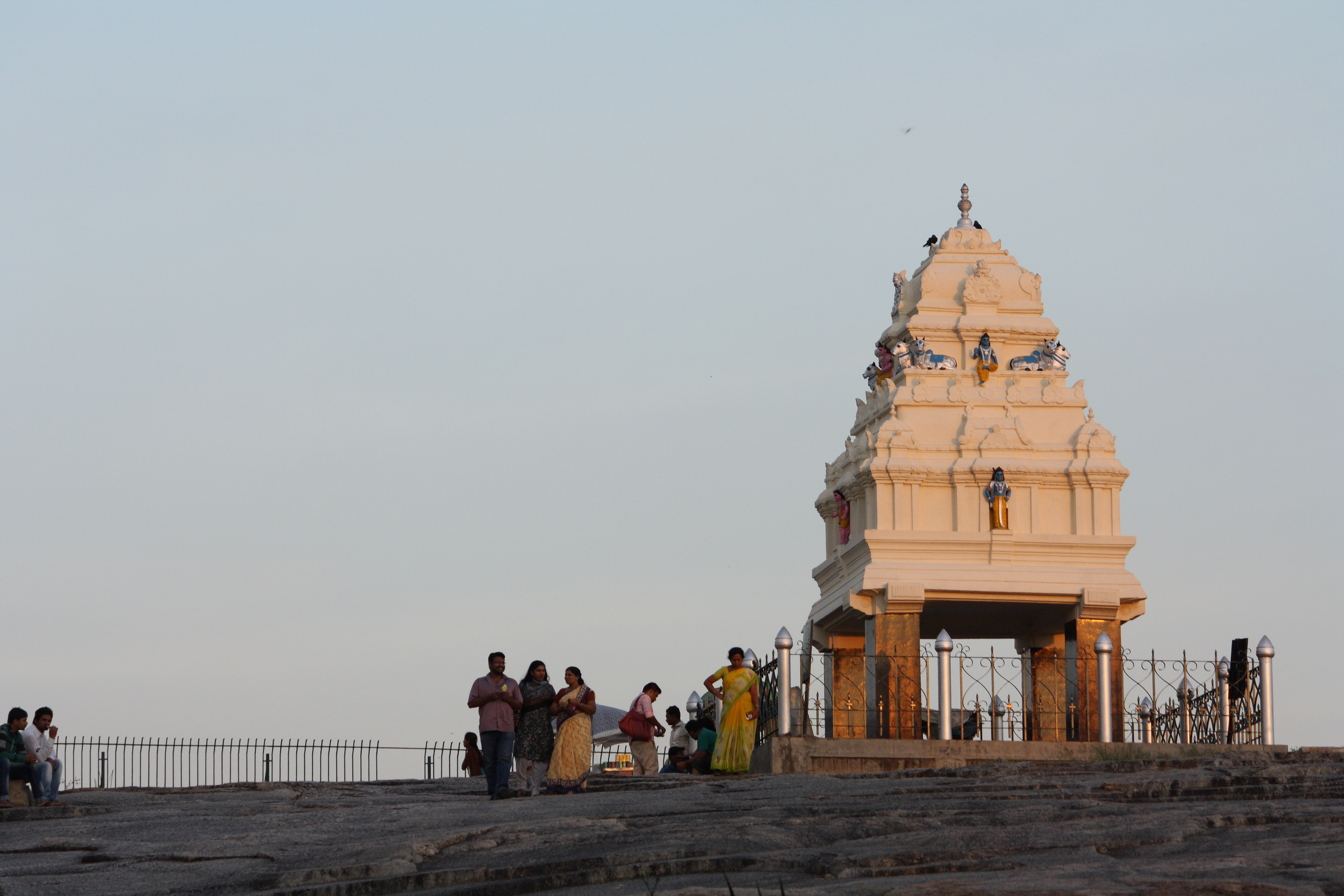
Kempe Gowda Tower at Lal Bagh

Bust of Kempe Gowda at Dr. Rajkumar Children Park (Jinke Park), Bengaluru (2026)
