= Bengaluru Pete =

Bengaluru
- Neighbourhood
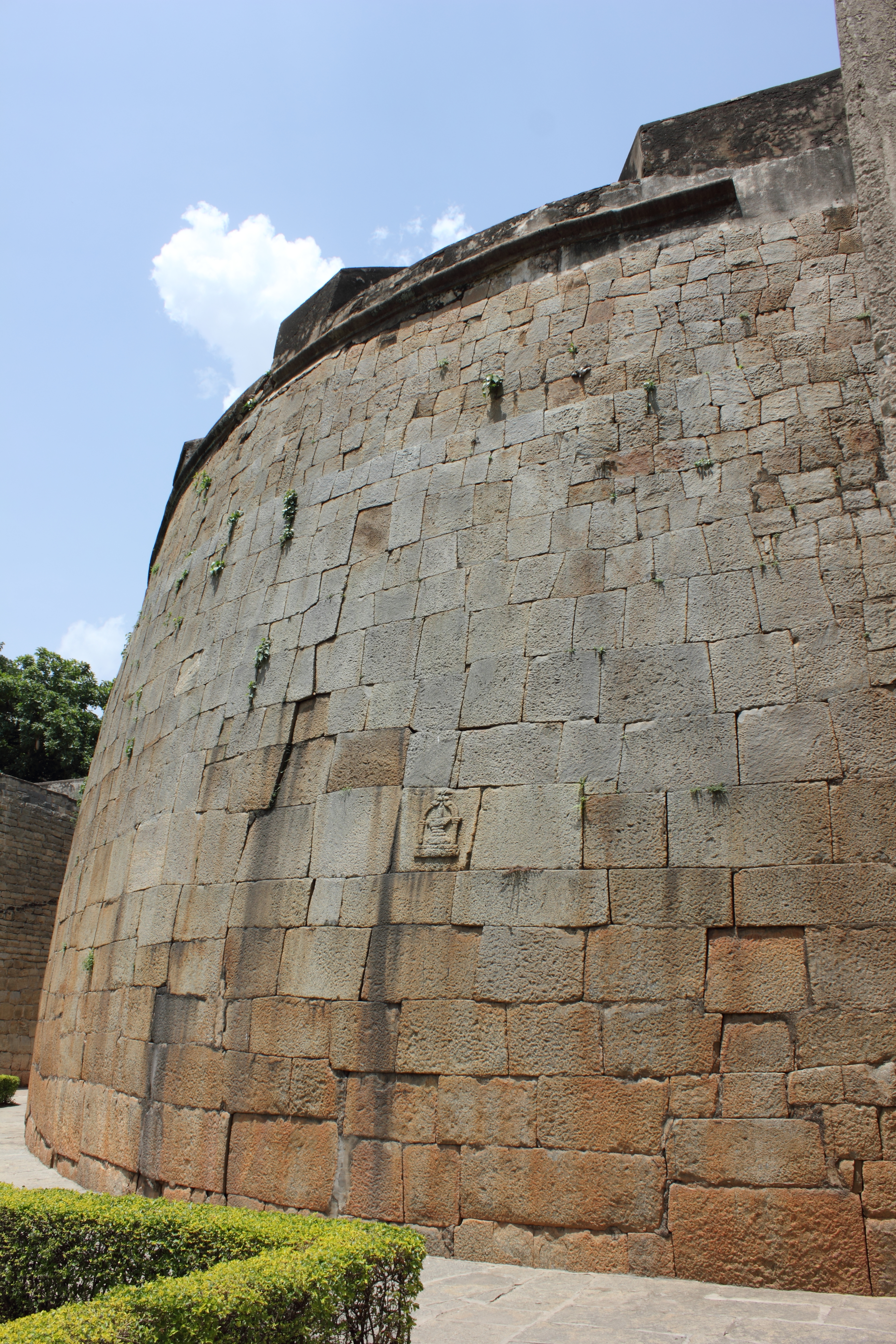

- Location in Bengaluru, India
- Coordinates: 12.9627°N 77.5758°E
- Country: India
- State: Karnataka
- District: Bengaluru Urban
- Metro: Bengaluru

Area
  - Total: 2.24 km^{2} (0.86 sq mi)
- Elevation: 900 m (3,000 ft)

Languages
  - Official: Kannada
- Time zone: UTC+5:30 (IST)

Bengaluru Pete is the area of Bengaluru city which was established by Kempegowda I (c. 1510–1570) in 1537 with roads laid out in the cardinal directions, and entrance gates at the end of each road. Kempegowda also termed the Pete he built as his "gandu bhoomi" or "Land of Heroes". Pete (Kannada: Market centre) forms a well–defined body of markets which were associated with various trades and professions of the populace in the locality markets and given the names of trades pursued in such markets. The well known markets are the Tharagupete–market for grains, the Balepete – for Bangles and musical instruments, the Chikkapete and the Nagarthpete for textile trade, the Ballapurpete and the Ganigarapete market where oil is extracted by people of the Ganiga community, the Tigalarapete–flower market of gardeners, the Cubbonpete – textile manufacture by people of the Devanga community.

The Bengaluru Pete, established in 1537 around the Mud Fort, built by Kempe Gowda I as the nucleus, with an area of 2.24 square kilometres (1 mi^{2}), has expanded to the present sprawling city of 741 square kilometres (286 mi^{2}) embracing a multi ethnic population of 5.7 million; as per Census of India 2001, the present population is reported as 6.6 million (2007) and is thus known by the epithet "the Boom city". The other nicknames of the city also reflect the growth direction of the city, such as the Silicon Valley of India, the "Fashion Capital of India," and "The Pub City of India."

The old Pete, structured in the contemporary style of deep networks of crowded streets, richly represented the multi cultural identity, social history, and economic geography of the times which are considered as a hallmark in the planning and design of any urban agglomerate. The place has left its mark on literature with novels like Riddle of the Seventh Stone being set in this part of Bengaluru. These attributes have been further accentuated in the present day Bangalore city. It is now the third largest metropolis in India, the largest city in Karnataka state and the 28th largest city in the world.

== History ==
Even though historically Bengaluru is chronicled to the period of 900 AD, but with confirmed history of the Bengaluru Pete traced to 1537, when Kempe Gowda I (pictured), a Chieftain of the Vijayanagara Empire, widely held as the founder of modern Bangalore, built a mud fort and established the area around it as his province. He was the great-grandson of Jaya Gowda who established the Yelahankanada Prabhu clan, in 1418 AD, and whose principality was in Yelahanka, north of the present day Bangalore. Kempegowda I, who showed remarkable qualities of leadership from his childhood, had a grand vision to build a new city which was further fueled by his visits to Hampi (now a UNESCO heritage city) the then beautiful capital city of the Vijayanagar Empire. He persevered with his vision and got permission from the King Achutaraya, the ruler of the empire, to build a new city for himself. The King gifted 12 hoblis (revenue subdivisions) with an annual income of 30,000 varahas (gold coins) to his Chieftain Kempegowda to meet the expenses of his venture of building a new city.

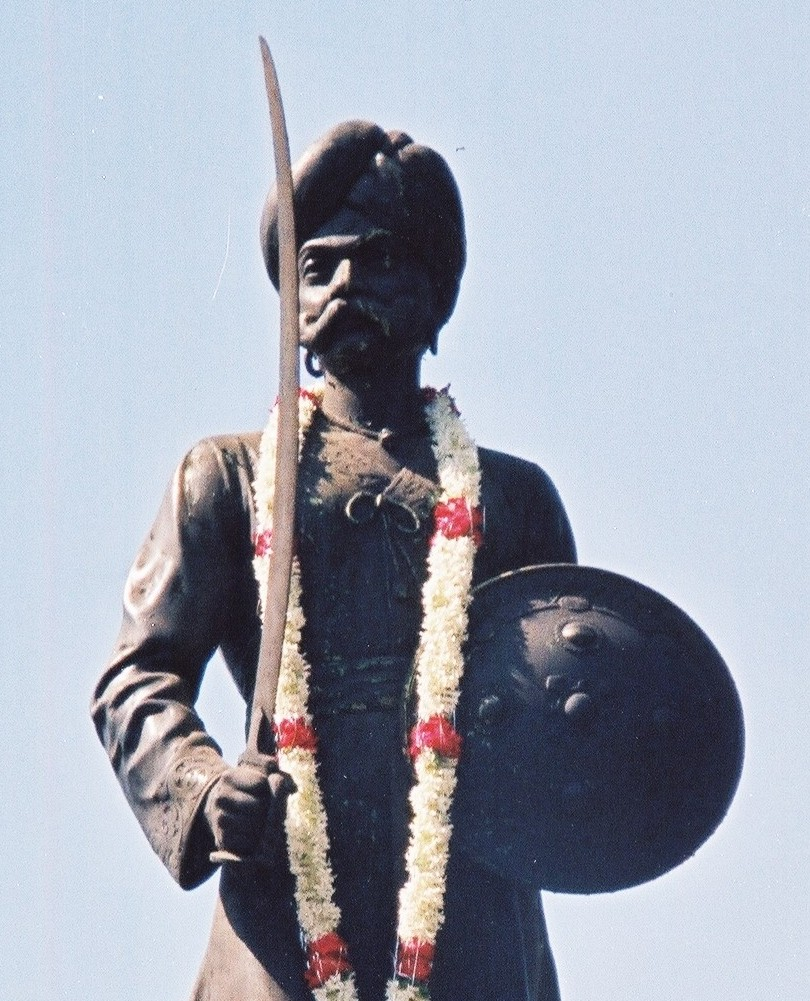
Kempegowda I, builder of Bangalore or Bengaluru pete, his statue opposite the Bangalore Corporation office

Kempegowda moved from his ancestral land of Yelahanka to establish his new principality, having obtained support from King Achutaraya. One version for the site selection process for the Bangalore Pete is that during a hunting expedition along with his advisor Gidde Gowda, he went westward of Yelahanka and reached a village called Shivasamudra (near Hesaraghatta) some 10 miles (16 km) from Yelahanka where, in a tranquil atmosphere under a tree, he visualised building a suitable city with a fort, a cantonment, tanks (water reservoirs), temples and people of all trades and professions to live in it for his future capital. It is also said that an omen of an uncommon event of a hare chasing away a hunter dog at the place favoured selection of the place and a dream of goddess Lakshmi (Hindu Goddess of wealth) that prophesied good indications of the events to happen further sealed his decision on the place for his capital. Following this event, on an auspicious day in 1537 A.D., he conducted a ground breaking ritual and festivities by ploughing the land with four pairs of decorated white bulls in four directions, at the focal point of the junction of Doddapet and Chikkapet, the junction (pictured) of the present day Avenue Road and Old Taluk Kacheri Road (OTC).

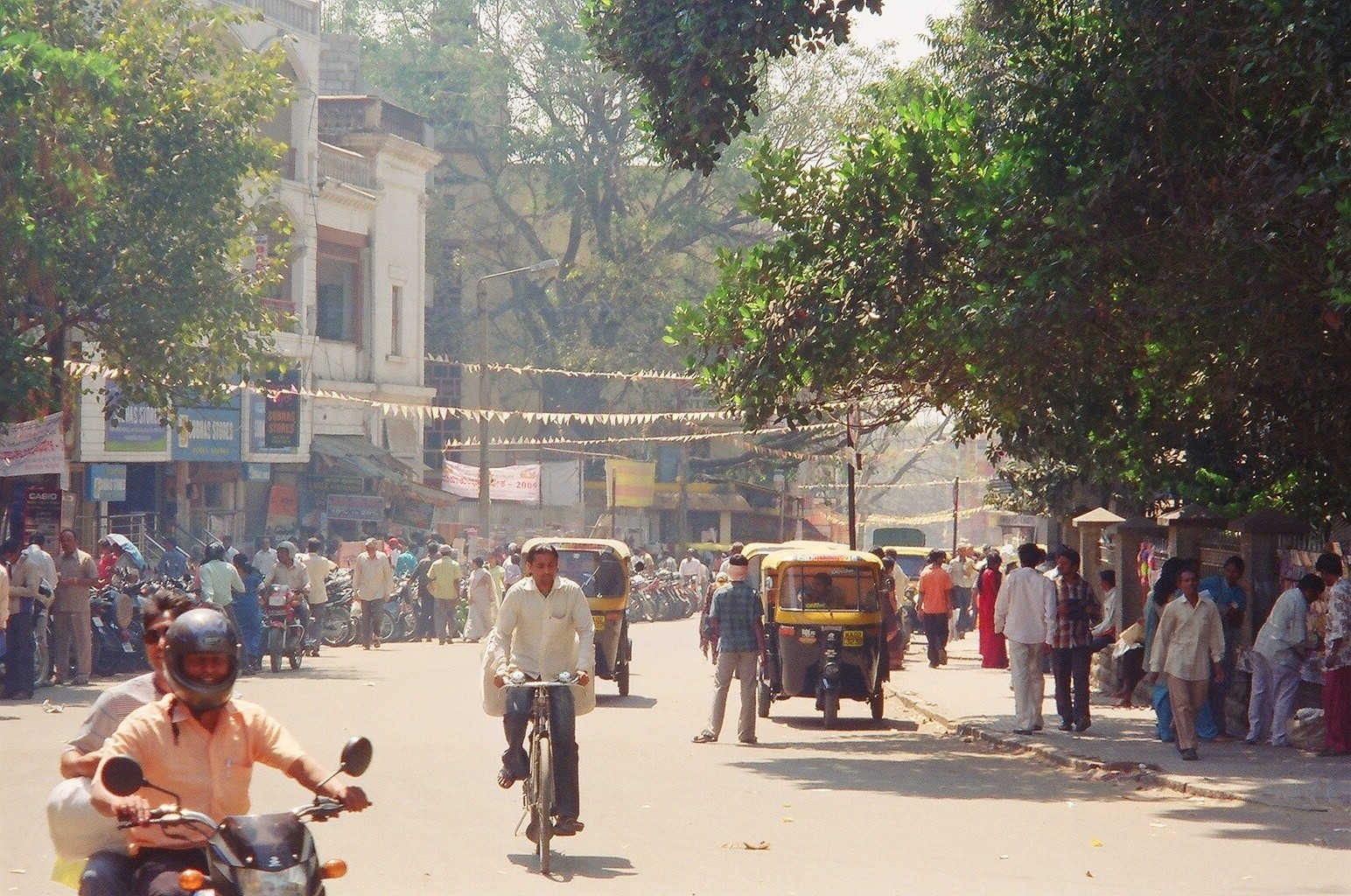
The Doddapete (now called Avenue road) crossing with Chickpete

Thereafter, he constructed a mud fort (now in the western part of the city), with a moat surrounding it, which had nine large gates. Building of the mud fort is also steeped in a legend which is a tragic but heroic story. During the construction of the Fort it was said that the southern gate would fall off no sooner than it was built and human sacrifice was indicated to ward off the evil spirits. Kempe Gowda could not accept such a situation nor permit any such event to occur. But his daughter-in-law, Lakshamma, realising her father-in-Law's predicament, beheaded herself with a sword at the southern gate in the darkness of night. Thereafter, the fort was completed without any mishap. In her memory, Kempegowda built a temple in her name in Koramangala. Thus, Kempegowda's dream fructified and the Bengaluru Pete evolved around the Mud fort called the Bangalore Fort. This mud fort (see infobox) was converted and enlarged into the present stone fort during Chikkadeva Raya Wodeyar's rule between 1673 AD – 1704 AD and Hyder Ali's rule, in 1761.

It has also been reported that Guru Nanak, the 1st Sikh Guru, on his way back from Sri Lanka halted at Bangalore. Kempegowda met him and sought his blessings. Guru Nanak not only blessed Kempegowda but also advised him to develop the place.

The Pete

The Pete as built by Kempegowda I had two main streets, namely the Chikkapet Street, which ran east–west, and the Doddapet Street, which ran north–south. Their intersection formed the Doddapete Square (present Avenue road), the heart of Bangalore. Halasoor, also called Ulsoor (east), Sondekoppa (west), Yelahanka (north), and Anekal (south) were the four gates erected at the cardinal directions. Five more gates were also built and these were named as Varthur, Sarjapur, Kankanahalli, Kengeri and Yeshwantapur gates. Relating the Pete to the present landmarks of the city, the following are mentioned:

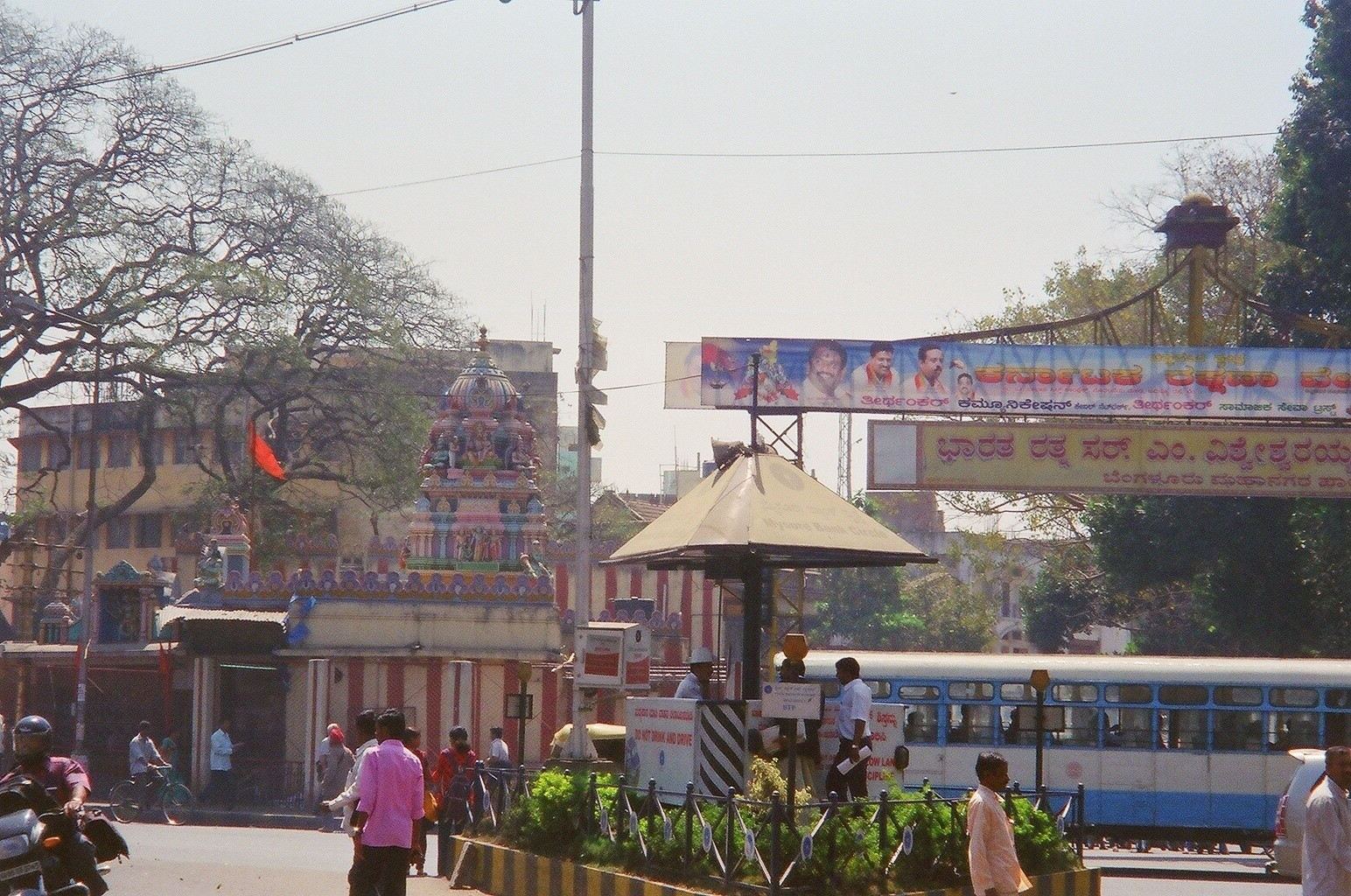
The ancient Hanuman temple built by Kempegowdas at the Avenue road crossing

- The fort extends from 'Binny Mill' in the west to the Ulsoor Police Station in the east, and from the Anjaneya Temple (pictured) near Mysore Bank in the north to Prof. Shivashankar Circle (near Fort High School) in the south.
- The main street extends from Sunakkalpet Circle in the east to the Goodshed Road in the west and this stretch is now known as Old Taluk Kacheri Road.
- The main street of the Pete from Avenue Road (Doddapete Road) in the north to Krishna Rajendra (KR) Road in the south.

Temples and lakes were planned and residential layouts, or agraharas (residential areas of Brahmins), around each temple were built during the rule of Kempegowda I, in and around the Pete, which along with the mud fort built by him, changed Bengaluru from a village to a centre of culture based on the Hindu religion. These developments were fashioned in the tradition of the Vijayanagara cities. The montage of bazaars, temple complexes and agraharams in and around the Pete got a further fillip during the rule of Kempegowda II, who built four cardinal towers setting limits for the growth of the Bengaluru pete. But the growth of Bengaluru has far outstripped these limits several-fold.

The visionary approach of the Kempe Gowdas, perceiving the needs of the growing population of the Pete, resulted in building a number of lakes/ponds (called 'Kere' in the Kannada language) and temples (some are pictured in the gallery) in and around the fort. Some of the notable ones are :

- The lakes in the inner circle are the Kempe Gowda Agrahara, Siddikatte, Sampangi, Dharmambudhi, Kempambudhi kere, and Karanji.
- The outer circle lakes were the Yediyur, Chennamma, Mavalli, Akki Thimmana halli, Jakkaraya kere. Most of the lakes have been encroached upon for the present urban needs.
- The early temples built or improved were the Gavi Gangadhareshwara Temple, Nandi (Bull Temple) (Basavanna), Dodda Ganapathi, Karanji Anjaneya, Ulsoor Someswara, Koramangala Lakshmi, Mahakali, Veerabhadra, Vinayaka and Kalabhairava.

Pete expansion

With the decline of the rule of the Kempegowdas' clan, the Maratha rule and culture followed for some time. In 1638, Pete was conquered by Bijapur Sultan who ruled for the next 50 years. The Mughals took over in 1687 and leased the town and the surrounding areas to Chikkadeva Raya Wodeyar of the Mysore Kingdom, in 1690 AD. Chikkadeva Raya Wodeyar (1673 AD −1704 AD) built an oval shaped fort south of the old mud fort and after his death in 1704 AD, the rule of Hyder Ali and Tippu Sultan ensued until Tippu's death at the hands of the British in 1799 AD. It was Hyder Ali who rebuilt the mud Fort in stones. During their reign, a palace called the Tippu's Palace was built at the South end of the fort and a Hindu temple for Lord Srinivasa was also built adjoining Tippu's Palace, which is called the "Kote Venkataramana Temple" or "Fort temple". At this stage, the old Pete had expanded to a circumference of 5 kilometres (3 mi) with prosperous, well laid out streets and flourishing shops [the market stretched from the north gate – the present Avenue road (pictured) – of the Pete to the oval fort]. A beautiful botanical garden called the Lalbagh was also built in 1760 AD. The Pete became not only a commercial centre but also a military centre of strategic importance.

The Pete initially developed as a pedestrian precinct with the public spaces evolving with bazaar streets, temple squares, lakes and maidans (open grounds). But, under the Wodeyars' rule, during the British Raj, in the 19th century, public gardens developed along with the suburbs, adjoining the traditional Pete, following western planning concepts with wider roads. The streets were built in a gridiron pattern and designed to cater to heavy vehicular traffic.

During the colonial rule the British expanded the Pete, to include the cantonment to position their garrison, which was separated by an 11.5 kilometres (7 mi) wide strip of open land. The colonial city by coincidence decongested the old native city (Pete) and also provided much needed green 'lung space'. Since then several developments, post independence (1947 till date), have led to the rapid growth of the city.

Old Stories

From the time of Kempegowda, the caste leaders assumed the functions of policing and rendering justice, with inter-caste disputes being usually settled in favor of the upper castes. In the 19th century, when the Bangalore Cantonment assumed dominance in terms of size and revenue, care was taken to ensure that there was very little or no contact between the Cantonment areas and the peté, with the Bangalore Cantonment being part of the British Madras Presidency and the Pete being under the administration of the Mysore Maharaja. In 1834, when Mark Cubbon, took over as the Commissioner of Mysore, one of his first task was to establish a legal system based on English Common Law, which ran parallel to the caste-based panchayats. With the establishment of the supremacy of the British courts, the significance of the traditional caste-based courts in the peté began to decline.

== Nineteenth-century accounts ==
=== P Ballahkristnah's description, 1853 ===
Writing on 7 April 1853, P Ballahkristnah, a Hindu scholar of the Wesleyan Educational Institution, Bangalore, provides a description of the Bangalore Petah. Bangalore is a table-land, offering Europeans travelers from Madras, much relief with the cooler climate. Fruits, vegetables, grains of many varieties grew abundantly. The Bangalore pettah is fully surrounded by tanks, which are artificial lakes used to supply water to the population of the petah. From the outskirts, the Petah looked like it had been recently destroyed by fire and fully de-populated, because of its bare mud walls. However, entering the gates, one finds a bustling city with huge crowds and busy market place. The lanes were narrow, covered with mud and dirt. Drains had been constructed by the Mysore Government at public expense, however, they were badly maintained and seeing bandicoots, rats, carcasses of dead dogs and stagnant water was common. The houses were like dungeons or dark cellars, without any light or ventilation. Singing mosquitoes, poisonous scorpions were common in these native houses. Bargaining was common in the shops, with the vendors quoting different prices for the goods according to how rich or poor the customer looked. Drunkenness was also common in the Bangalore Petah, across all classes of people.

=== Walker and Walker's account, 1855 ===
According to the Gazetteer of Southern India (1855), the Bangalore Petah is located south west of the Bangalore Cantonment at a distance of 1 mile. The population of the petah was 41664. The petah was surrounded by a mud wall and a dry moat which was overgrown with the thorny Mimosa saponaria (sekakai) plant. An old hedge measuring 80 yard across, which was a major worry during the British Siege of Bangalore, 1792, had been recently cleared off and the ground was built upon. The houses in the Bangalore Petah were flat roofed and the streets were open and had good drainage. The bazaars and the town appeared prosperous. There were two tanks one at the North and the other large one 2 miles to the south, which supplied water. The tank at the south had been destroyed by Tipu Sultan, and had been repaired by the British after his fall. Wells around the town, provided good supply of water to the petah. There was a free civil hospital, with an exclusive section for the Brahmins. There was also a mental asylum, a lepers' asylum, and a poor house, and a jail was in the process of being built.

=== Thomas Hodson's account, 1856 ===
Thomas Hodson, in 1856, describes Bangalore as consisting of two parts - the Cantonment where the soldiers lived and Tamil was primarily spoken, and the Old Town or the native town (Bangalore Pete) where Canarese was the main language. In both parts a total of 130,000 Indians lived. Further he describes the shops of the Bangalore petah, with mud being used for the walls and the floor, wooden pillars and clay used for flat roofs. There were no windows or any protection from the dust, with a mat from the rooftop for shade. At night, the shops were secured by wooden shutters. The shop-keeper sat on the floor of the shop, or on one of the lower shelves. The traders were cloth merchants, grocers, gold smiths, etc. The shops sold sugarcane, coconut, bananas, rice, sweets which were hung on a string and various grains which were kept in baskets with were smeared with cow-dung. Water carriers carrying water was a common site. There were thousands of monkeys which created mischief, but were unharmed by the natives due to their religious beliefs.

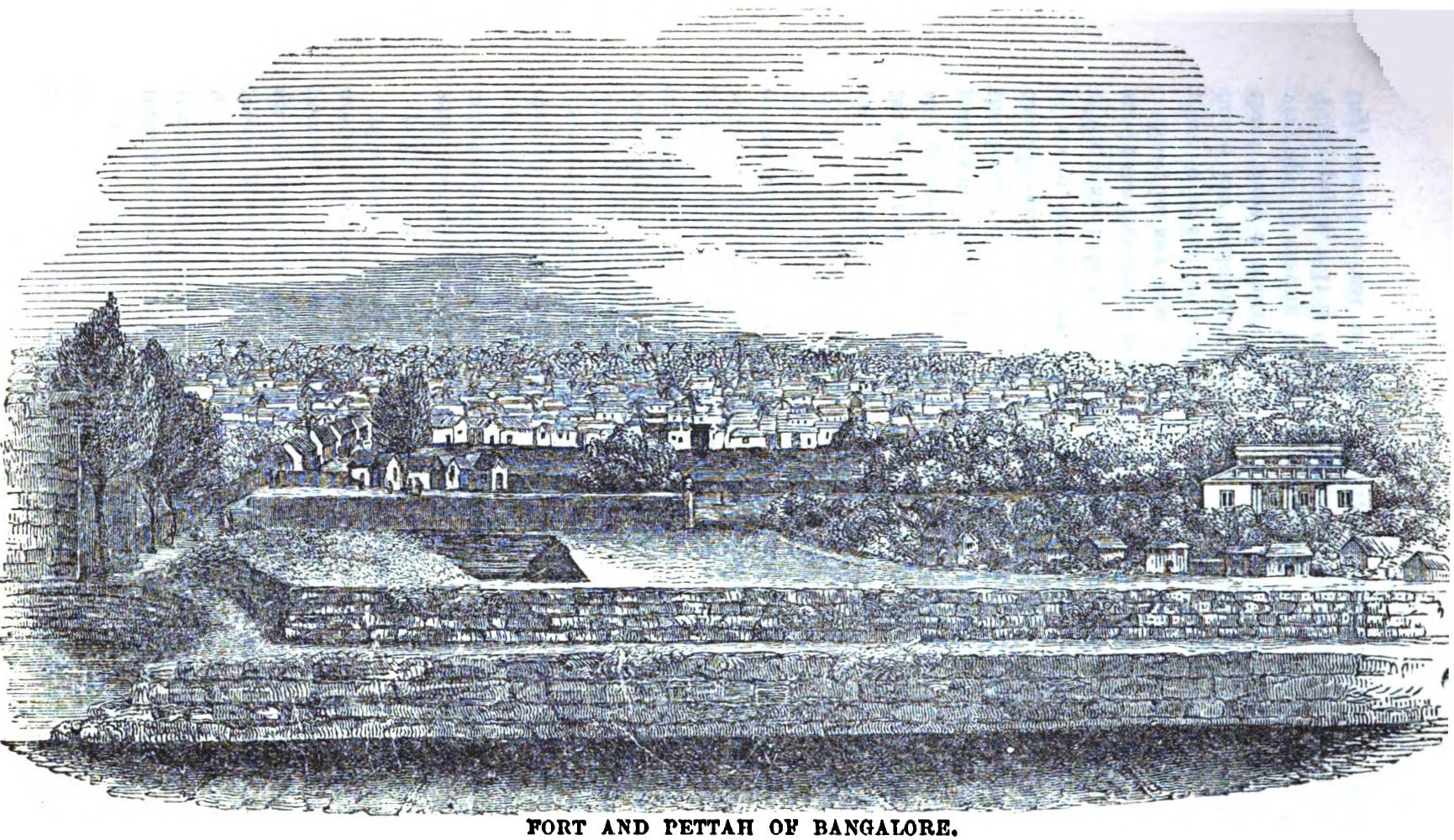
Fort and Pettah of Bangalore (p. 139, 1849)

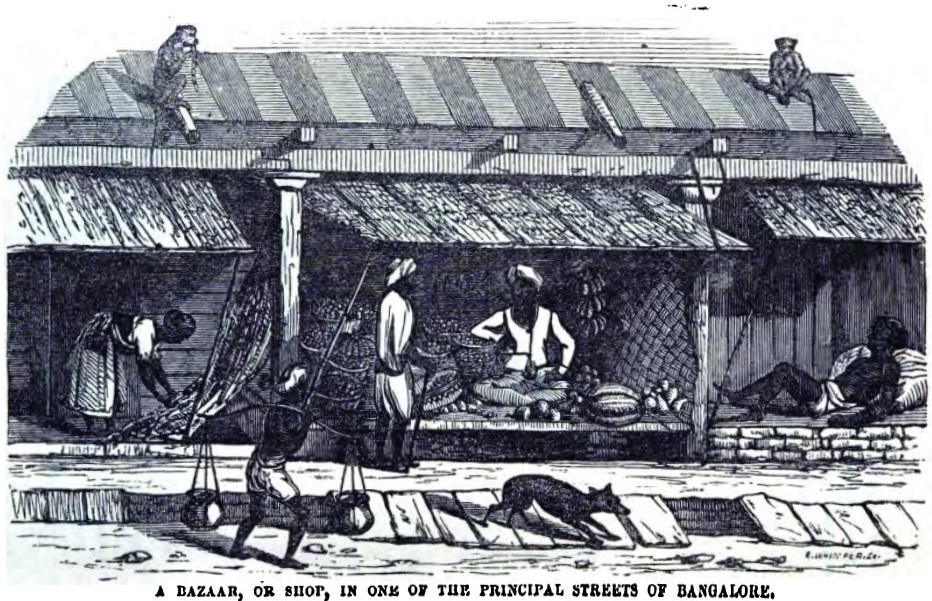
A Bazar, or Shop, in One of the Principal Streets of Bangalore (p. 97, 1856)

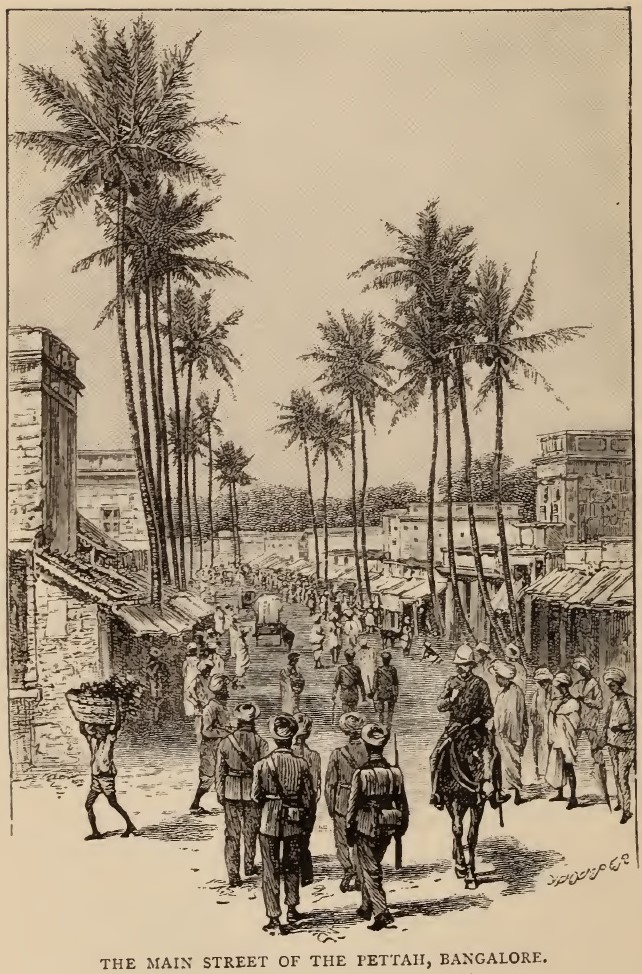
The Main Street of the Pettah, Bangalore, 1890

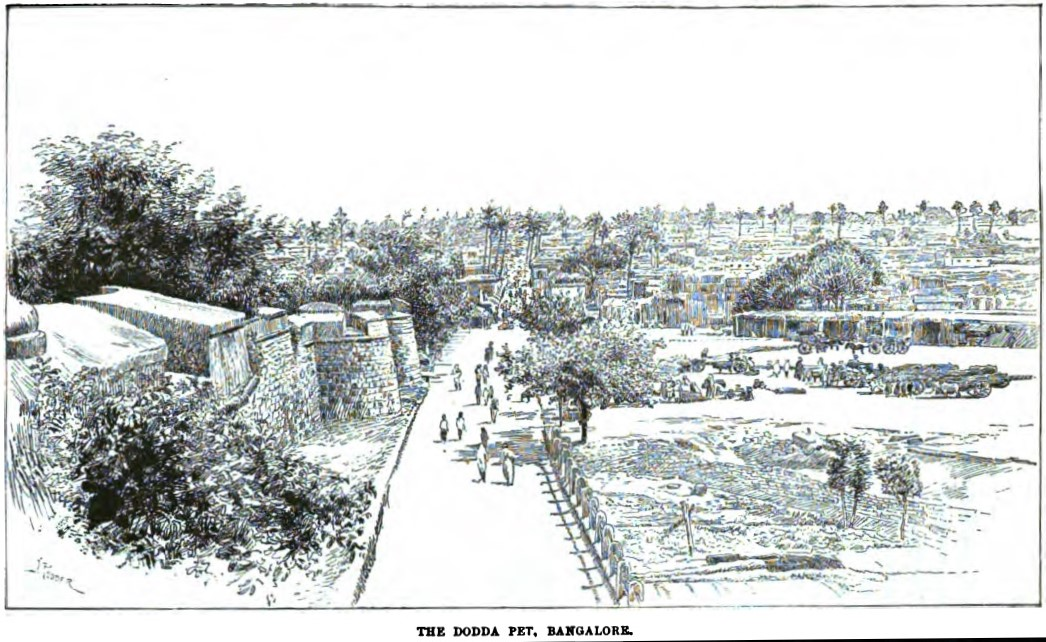
The Dodda Pet, Bangalore (Caine, 1891, p. 523)

=== Sarah Sanderson's account, 1858 and 1859 ===
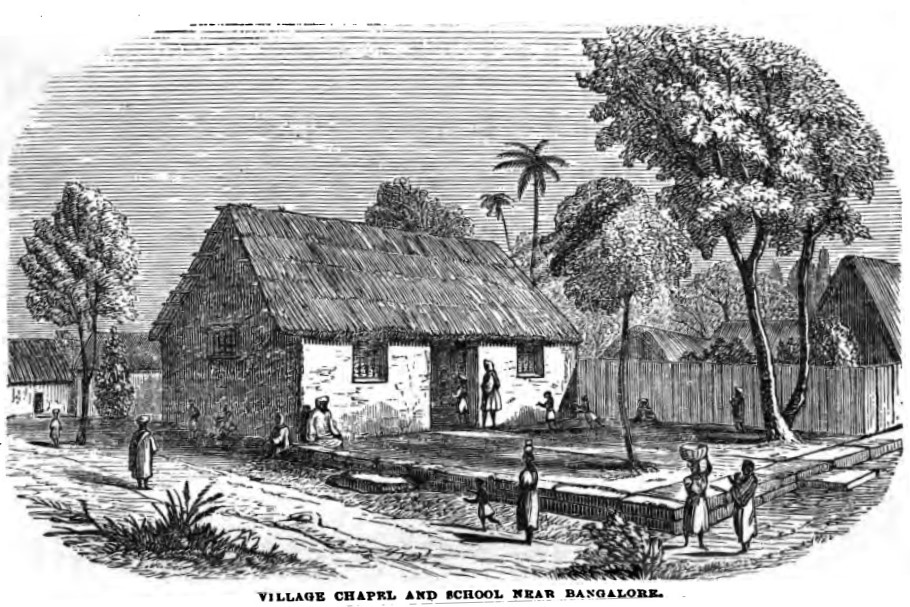
Wesleyan Village Chapel and School Near Bangalore by Thomas Hodson (1859)

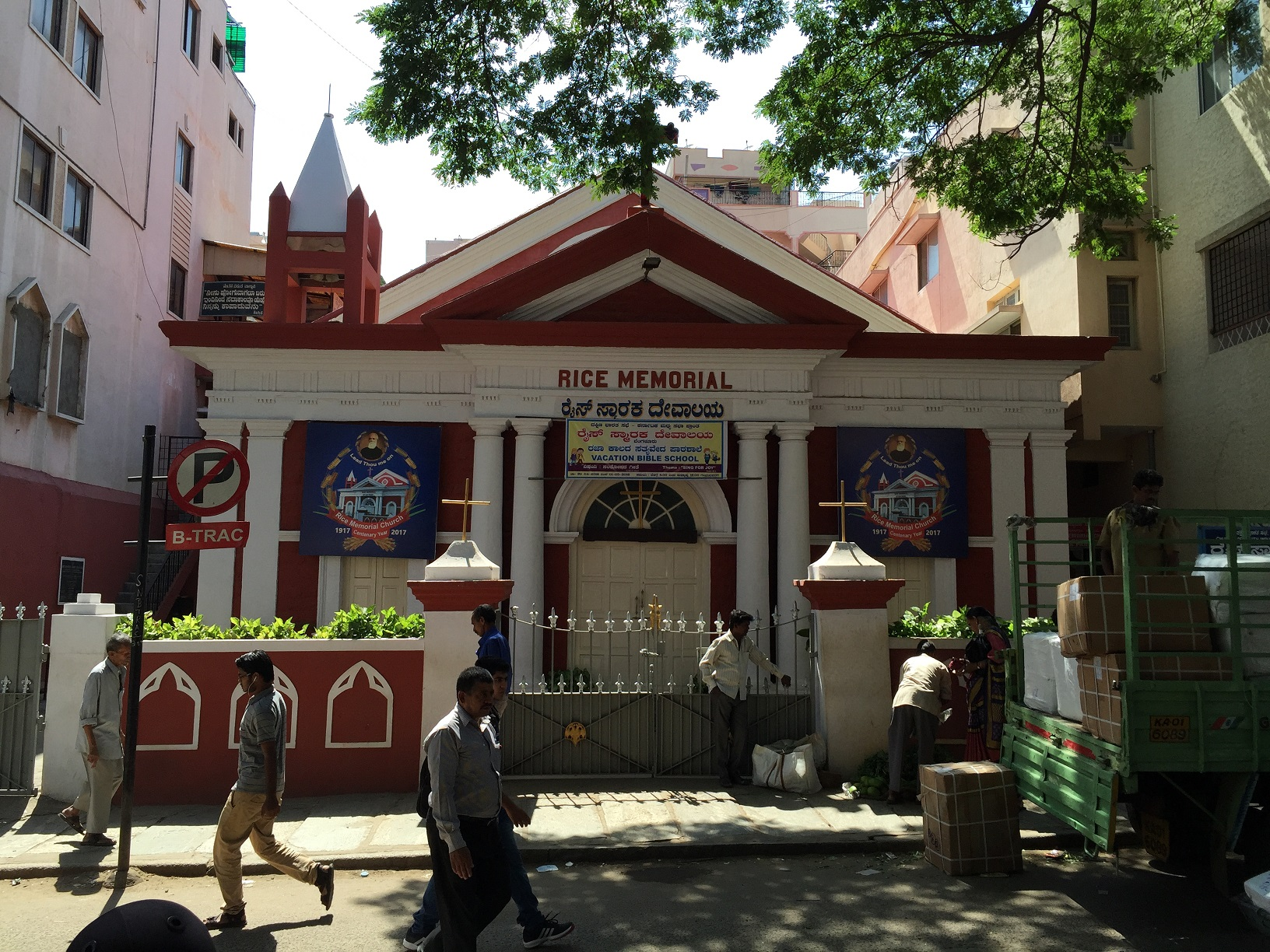
Rice Memorial Church, Avenue Road, Bangalore, (2016)

Writing on 24 November 1858, Sarah Sanderson (wife of Rev. Daniel Sanderson), describes the Wesleyan Mission School and Chapel in a Pariah village near the Bangalore Petah. The article also carried a sketch of the same, by Thomas Hodson. This school had some 30 children, 22 boys and 8 girls. They were taught by John a native catechist. Divine services were held on Sundays in Canarese at 7:30AM. The congregation consisted of 8-10 men and 25-30 children, and many others listening from outside the door. However, most seemed to attend out of curiosity of seeing the European ladies and men. The church services commenced by ringing the bell. Further, she describes the social scorn and humiliation suffered by the Pariah community, such as not being allowed to even walk in the street of the high caste people, untouchability practiced for the fear of pollution by lower castes. However, the Europeans readily employed servants from the Pariah communities and their sent to Mission schools, brightening their employment prospects.

Further, Sarah Sanderson, writing on 24 September 1859, describes the pettah as the native town of Bangalore with a population of about 60,000. The petah had nearly 200-300 temples or shrines, whose deities were anointed with oil making them greasy and black, and offered flowers and fruit. The petah now had 2 Christian churches, one was the London Mission Canarese Chapel (now Rice Memorial Church on Avenue Road) and the other was the Canarese Wesleyan Chapel opened a few months before September 1859. To the left of the Wesleyan Chapel was a low building, which had been altered and white-washed to serve as a school. The chapel did not have pews or a gallery. The floor was covered with bamboo matting, and there were rows of benches with seats of fancy cane-work (or rattan). 8 oil lamps using coconut oil were suspended from the ceiling to be used to lighting in the evenings. The windows which were generally kept open had iron bars to keep out the monkeys. Further, she says that her children liked walking the busy streets of the petah to reach the chapel along with their father, observing its noise, local people, shops and the monkeys. Monkeys were numerous in the Petah, and created nuisance by stealing food and other things from people.

Sarah describes some events such as a postman walking up to the pulpit to deliver a letter to the preacher in the middle of his sermon on a Sunday. Another, when the Muslim mourning of 'Moharrum' was being observed when she attended church one evening. The people used to walk in and out of the chapel as they pleased. All so different from the quiet atmosphere of any Wesleyan Chapel in England.

== Present urban status ==
The Pete as it exists today (overlay map) in the heart of Bangalore Metropolis reported a population of 112,076 persons in a diverse use area (Residential: 37.5%; Commercial: 34.6%; Industrial: 6.1%). The trades which defined the Pete in the past have remained but have enormously prospered with modern trades, as distinct entities with a built-in relationship between occupation and community with deep-rooted traditional patterns of living. An urban infrastructure study reported in a scholarly article by Champaka Rajagopal in the Journal of the Development and Research Organization for Nature Arts has the following remarkable observations.

- The Pete is presently, inhabited mainly by people from the Muslim, Devanga, Tigala, Marwari and Jain communities.
- In the Pete, industrial and trade activities overflow into the streets, and incredibly encroach public space.
- Within the Pete precincts, the Gujarati, Marwari and Jain communities from northwestern parts of the country, generally bankers, have gradually diversified their trade from pearl market to textile, garments, jewellery, paper, chemists, druggists, cutlery, metal, hardware and electrical goods.
- Medarpet is home to the more than 500 families of the Rajput Singh community having their Gurudwara Durbar Saheb Sangh built in memory of Shri Charan Singh Gujar. They make household plastic goods, and medarpete is the wholesale market for Plastic house hold goods.
- Marwaris of the Pete, for whom families still control inheritance and management of their own businesses, have diversified into several trades -– including assembly of computers -– serving new markets.
- Muslim communities of Kumbarpet, like the takaras (traders in household stone equipment), chapparband (menders of roof tiles), sikkalgar (dealers in copper/ brass vessels) and phuleras (traders of flowers) have, over time, diversified into the construction industry.
- In the Tharagupet area hardware dealers (mostly dominated by Muslims) say that they have benefited greatly by the rise in global markets, particularly in the construction industry.
- In spite of diversification of trade and industry, most of the areas within the Pete have retained their strong presence of community based occupations such as:
  - Avenue Road (old Doddapet road) retains its traditional trade in garments and textiles, jewellery and pawn brokering
  - Krishna Rajendra (KR) Market is known for trade in vegetables, fruits, flowers, iron and steel utensils
  - Sultanpete trades in paper and in Cubbonpete trade is in textiles
- All the above informal industries of the Pete are reported to have generated more jobs for people. The garment industry, in particular, has registered a volume of exports more than Information Technology.
- According to the Comprehensive Development Plan (CDP) of Bangalore, 1995 that determines zoning, land use and transport within Bangalore Metropolitan Area (which has zoned 1,306 square kilometres (504 mi^{2}) area of the Bangalore Development Authority), has zoned the city into intensely developed (Zone A), moderately developed (Zone B) and sparsely developed (Zone C) areas. The Pete falls within the intensely developed zone.
- The existing trends of development in the Pete is of a highly built up area and a population density that has resulted in less liveable conditions
- A detail study of the changing socio–economic patterns that could bring about in reality different development patterns, is essential by introducing new building byelaws by the municipal corporation
- . Therefore, the Pete skirts through formal enforceable legal systems but continues to develop in an alternative, less liveable way due to strong local politics.

The paper has chronicled the urban planning involving highly intertwined issues of the "pete" succinctly and the conclusion drawn from this study of the Pete is better reflected, as quoted:

"For a place as intricate and complex as the Pete, formulation of regulations through public participation would be sensitive and challenging. Communities, religions and economies have coexisted here but not without tensions… an inclusive methodology would help direct the role of the urban designer as a 'less cavalier' coordinator, addressing diverse disciplines and negotiating the efforts of various groups that shape urban places, especially for informal urban settings such as the Pete."

== Gallery ==
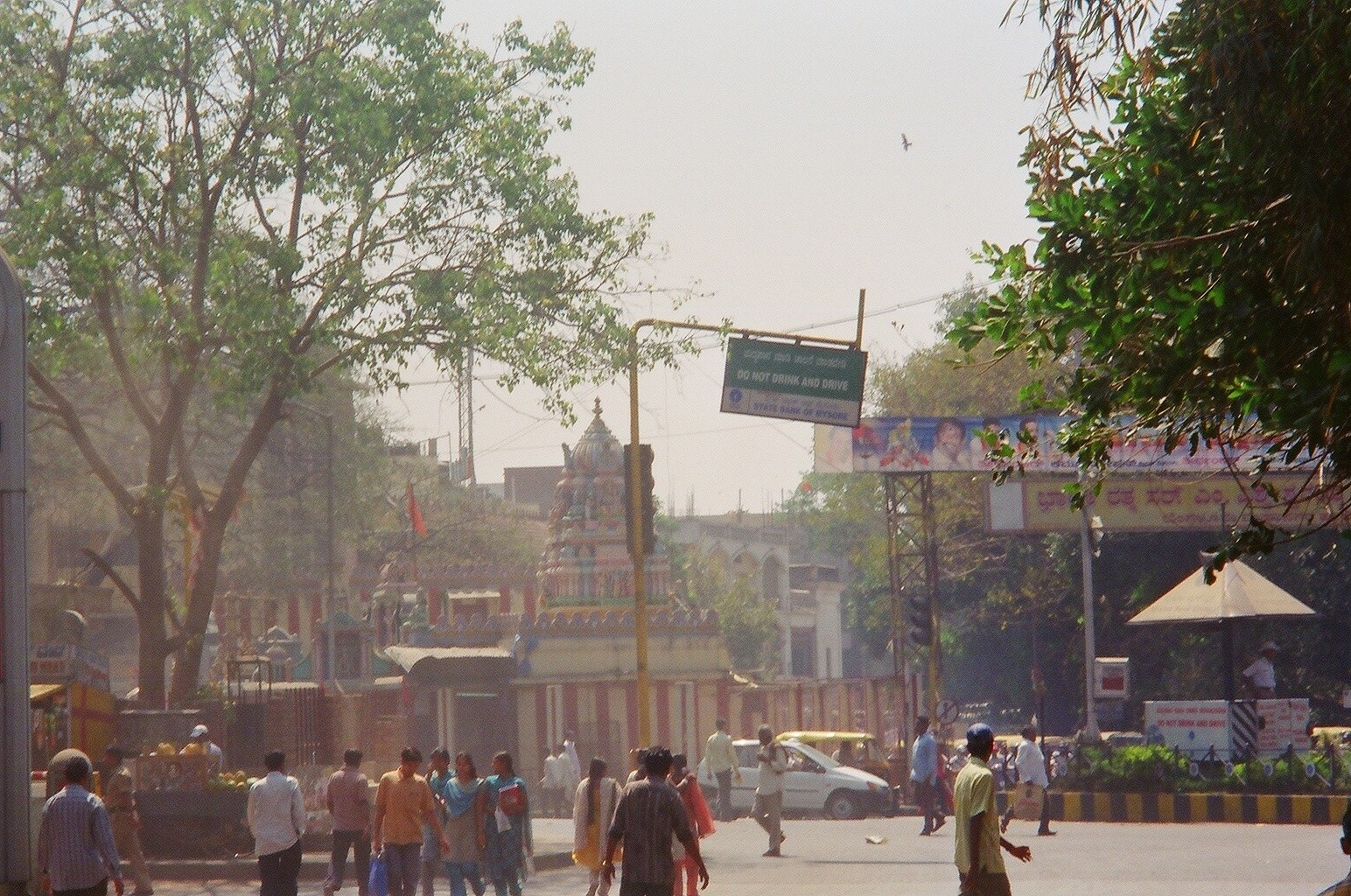
Anjaneya temple built by Kempegodas at the Avenue (Doddapete) road crossing

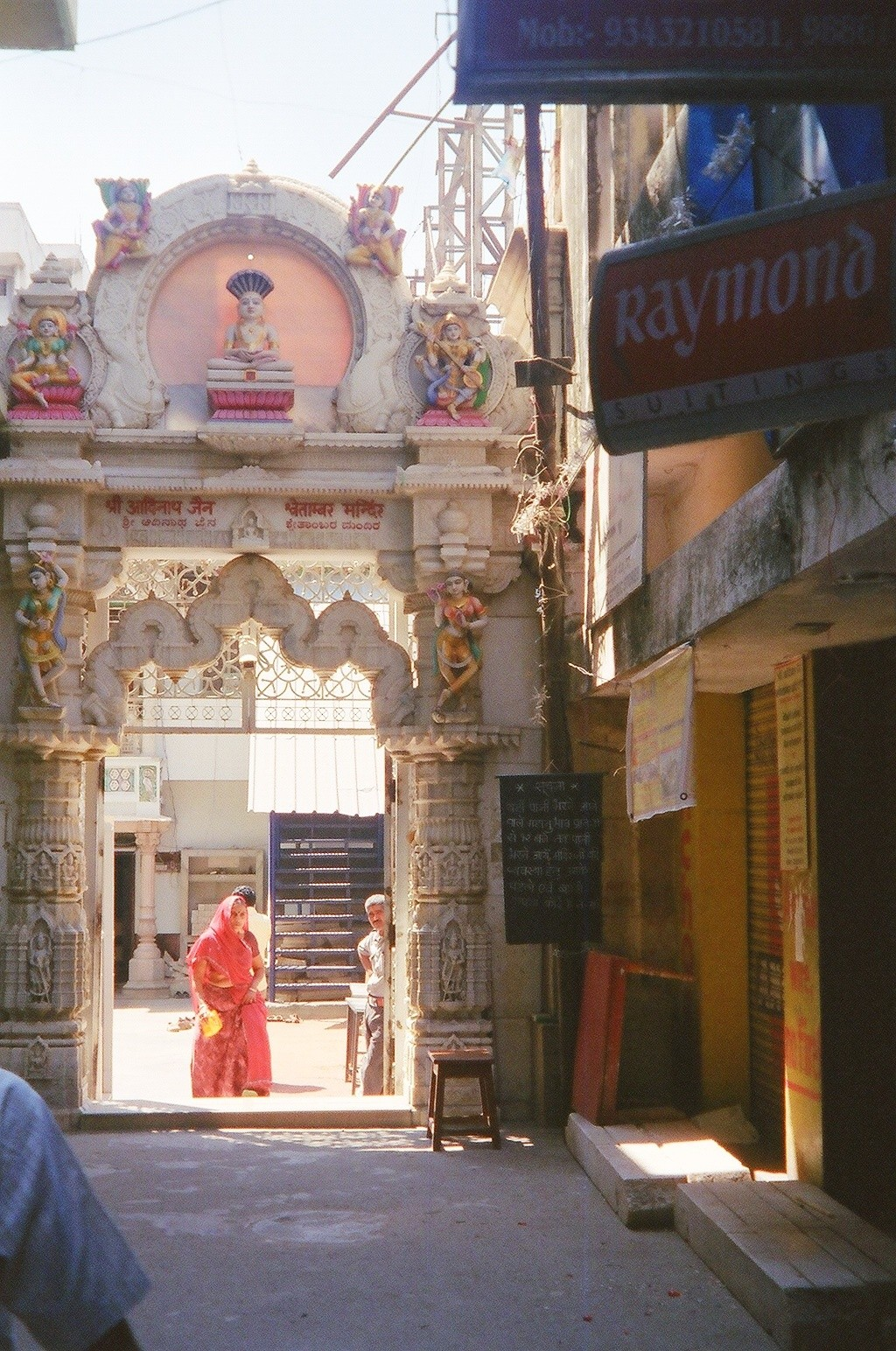
Arch entrance of a Jain temple in Chickpet

View of K R Market on a weekday.

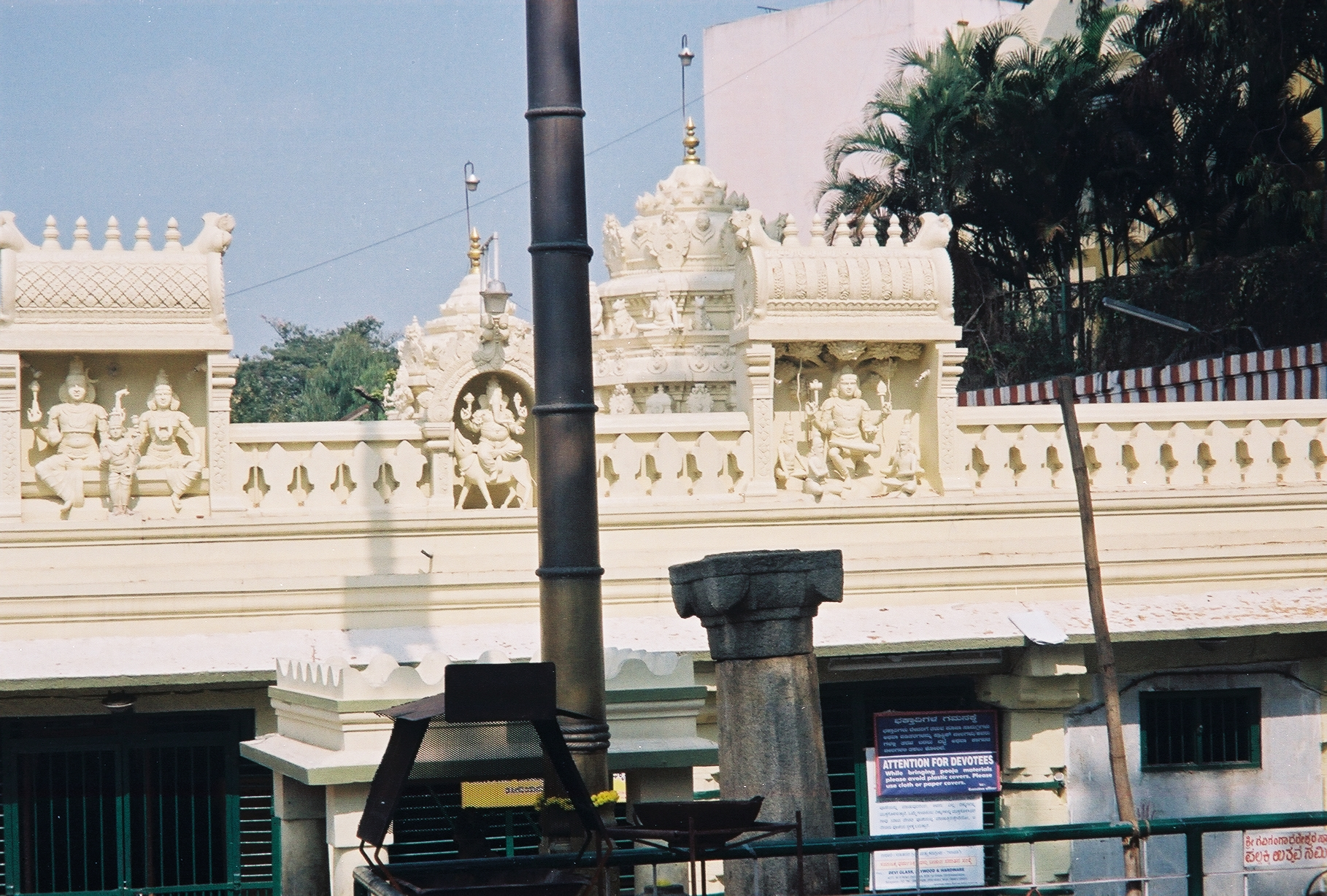
Entrance of the ancient Sri Gavi Gangadareshwara Temple (cave temple) renovated by Kempegowdas

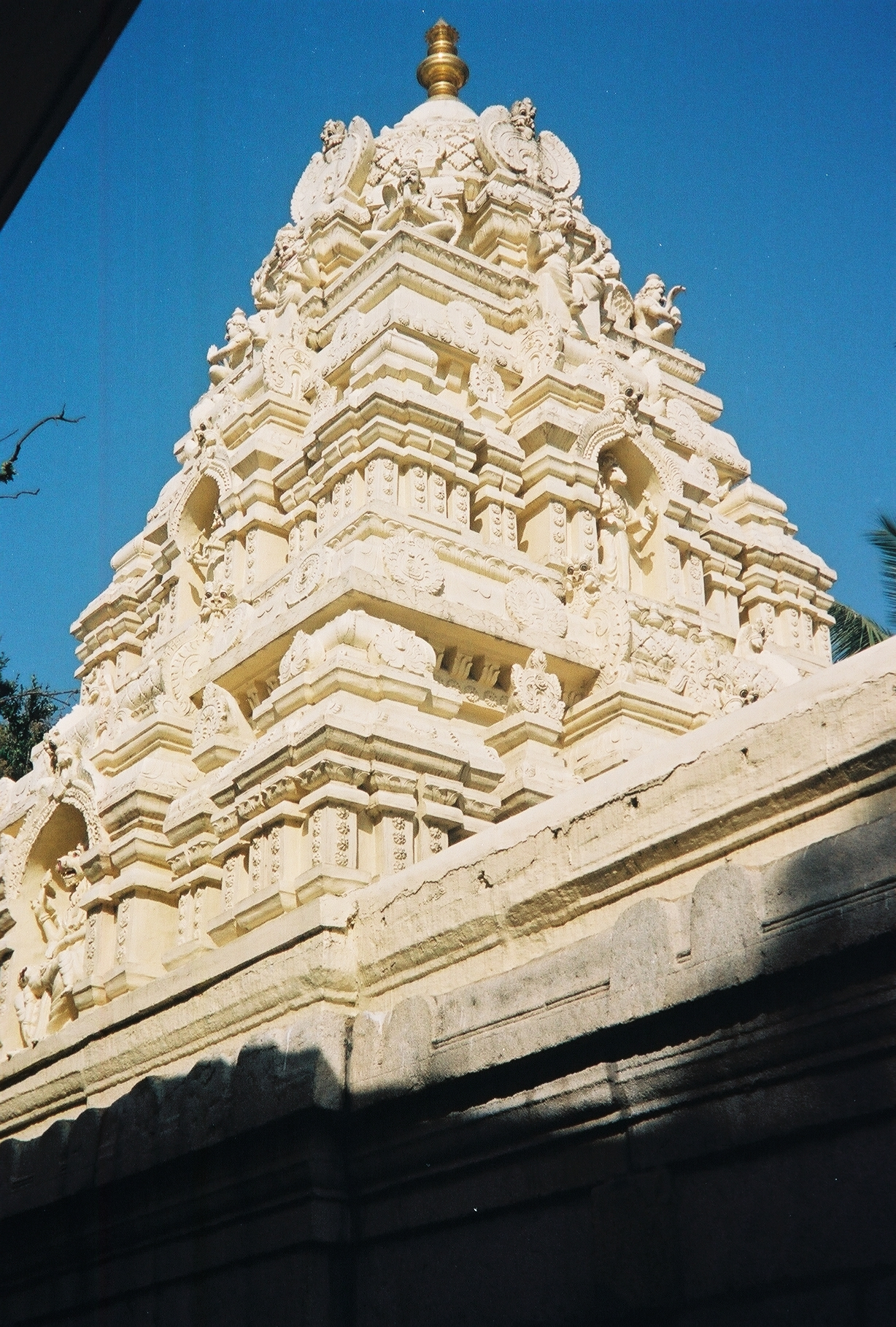
Kote srinivasa temple near the Fort

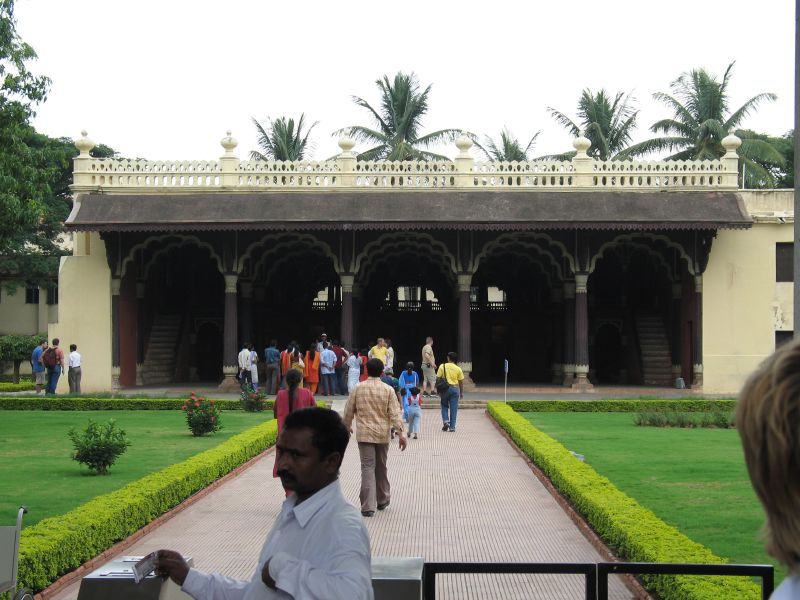
Tippu Sultan's palace in Bangalore built in 1761, next to the Srinivasa temple, near the old Fort

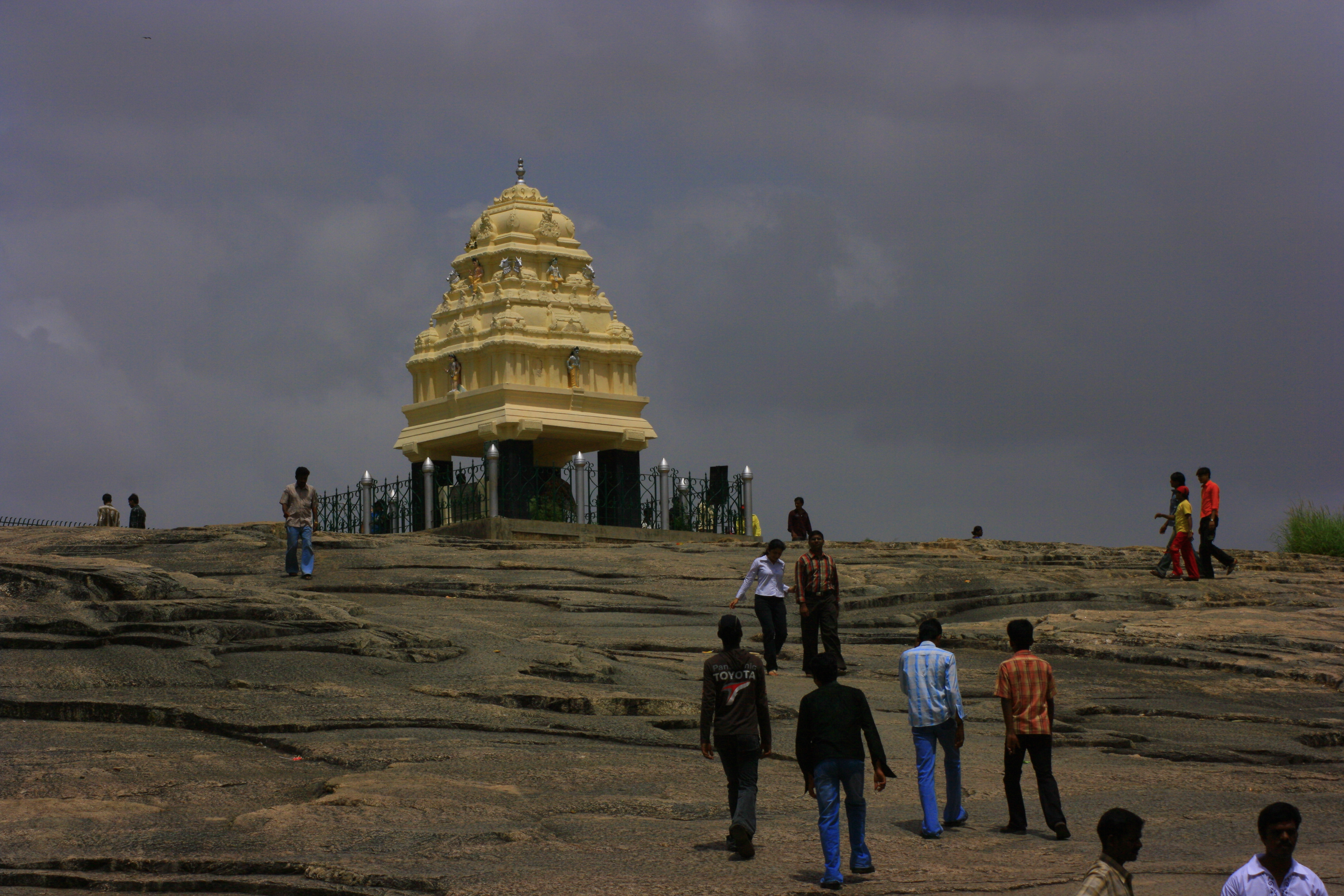
One of the four Cardinal towers of Bangalore erected in the Lalbagh

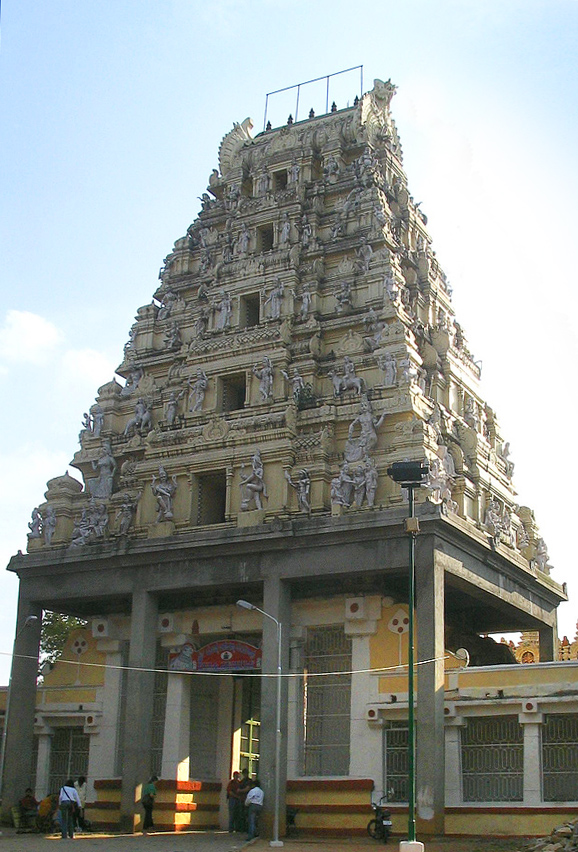
The Nandi Temple or Bull Temple is a famous temple located in the suburbs of the pete built during Kempegowdas rule

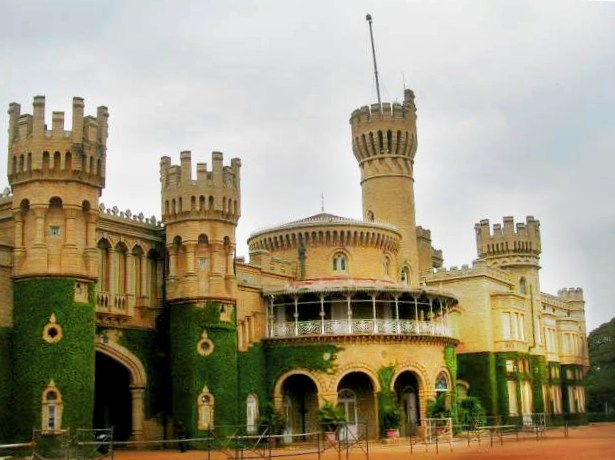
Bangalore Palace built by the Wodeyars of the rulers of Mysore in the 19th century

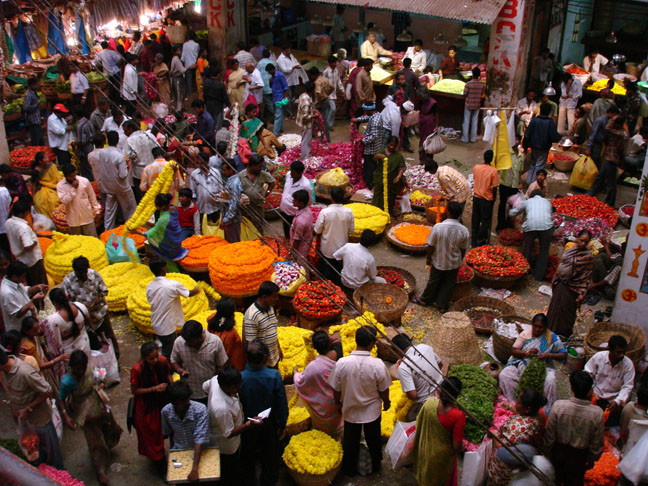
Bangalore City market near the old Fort

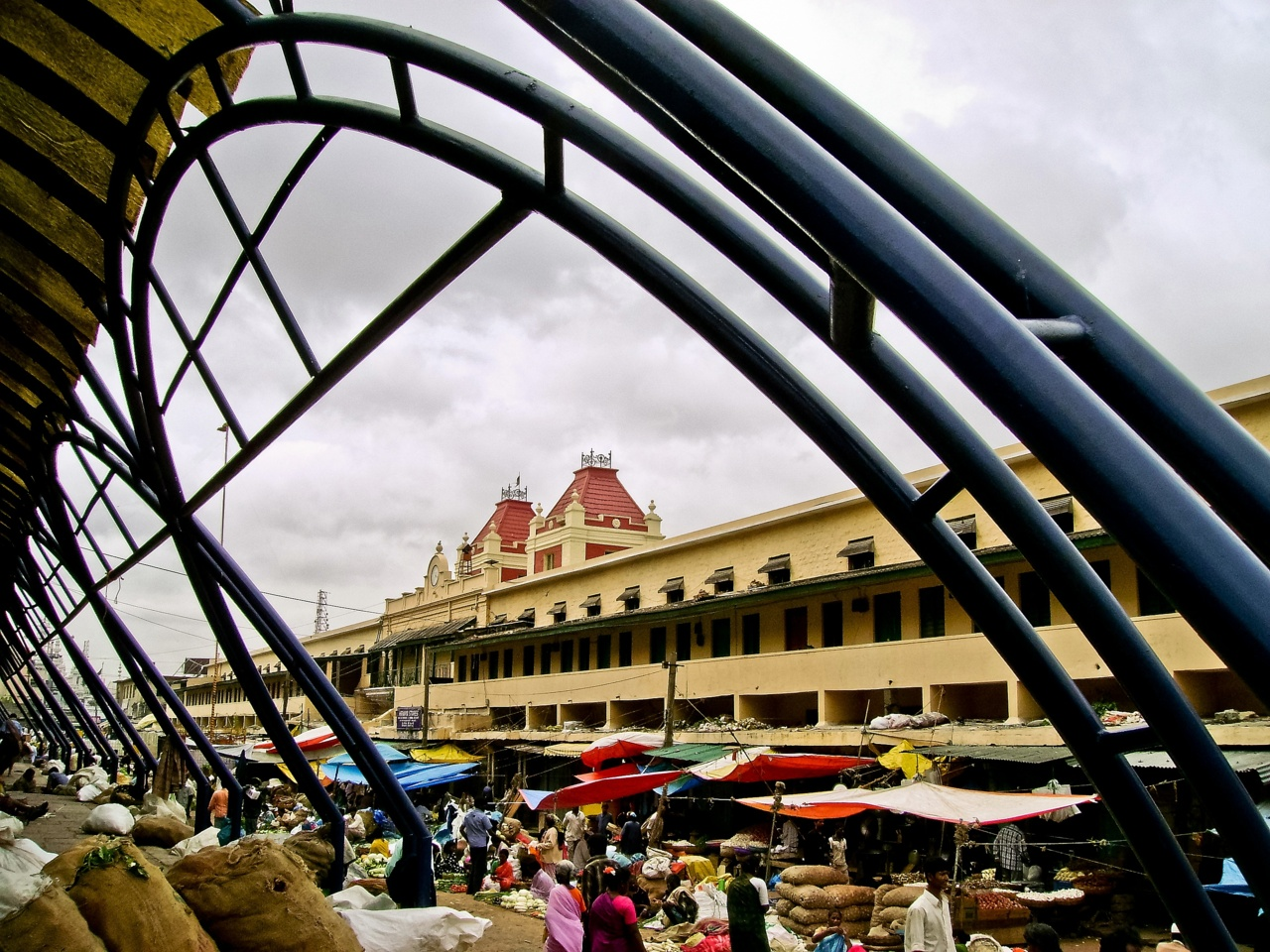
K.R. Market, Bangalore.

== See also ==
- K. R. Market
- Kempegowda I
- Bangalore Fort
- Lalbagh
