= Yelahanka Gate Anjaneya Temple =

Religion
- Affiliation: Hinduism
- District: Bangalore
- Deity: Lord Anjaneya

Location
- Location: Avenue Road, Bangalore
- State: Karnataka
- Country: India
- Interactive map of Yelahanka Gate Anjaneya Temple

Architecture
- Completed: 1680s

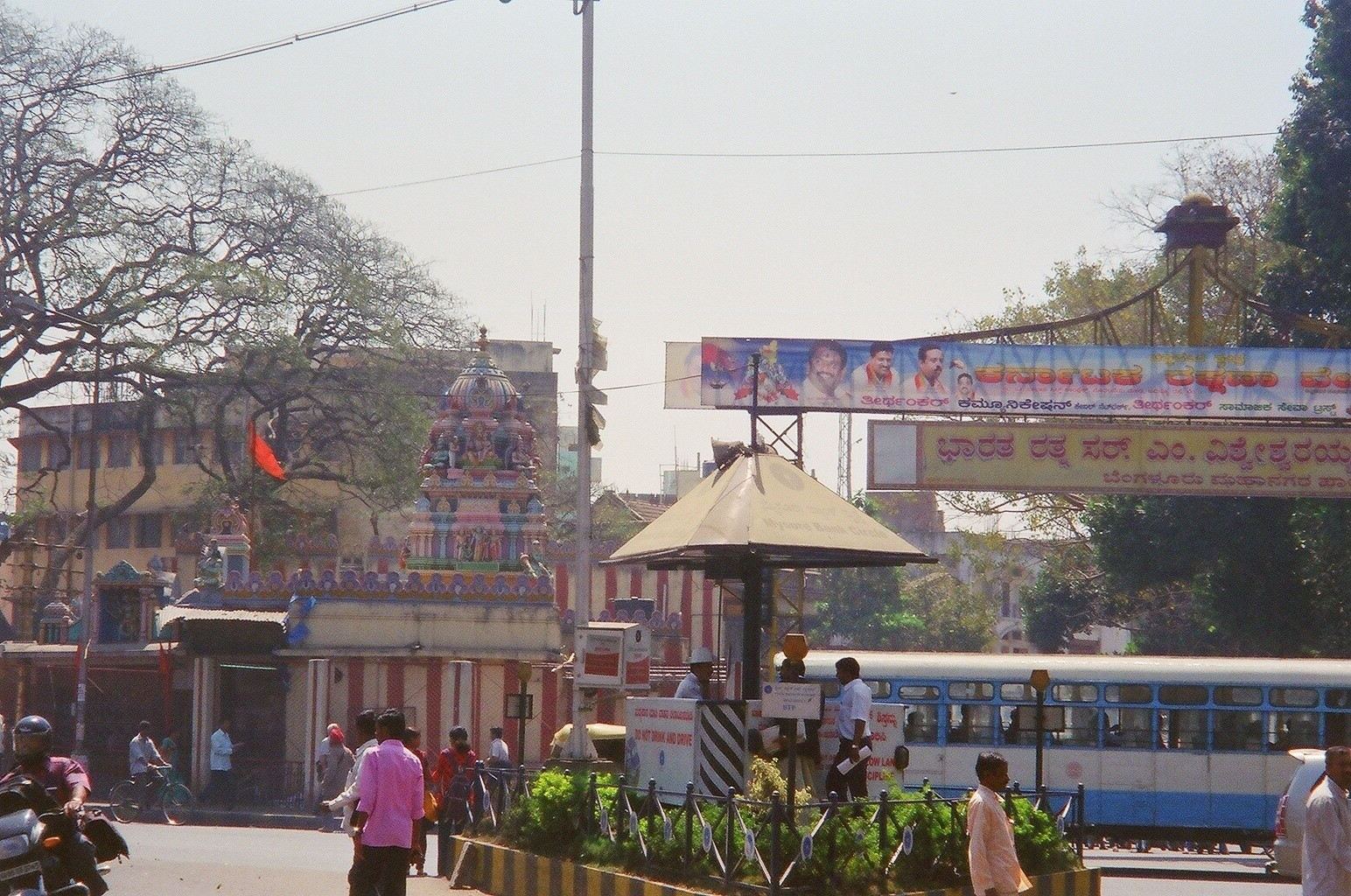
The ancient Yelahanka Gate Anjaneya Temple at the Avenue road crossing

Yelahanka Gate Anjaneya Temple is an ancient Hindu temple dedicated to Anjaneya in Avenue Road, Bangalore, India. The temple was built by Kempegowda, the founder of Bangalore. The temple was named after the Yelahanka gate of the Bangalore Fort where it was built.
