= Sondekoppa =

- village
- Location in Karnataka, India Sondekoppa (India)
- Coordinates: 13°00′N 77°22′E
- Country: India
- State: Karnataka

Languages
  - Official: Kannada
- Time zone: UTC+5:30 (IST)
- PIN: 562130
- Vehicle registration: KA-
- Coastline: 0 kilometres (0 mi)
- Nearest city: Bangalore
- Lok Sabha constituency: Chikballapur

Sondekoppa is a village, 30 km away from Bangalore, in the Indian state of Karnataka. During the kempegowda regime the binnipet was known as the gateway of Sondekoppa. Population of the village is about 15000.

== Temples ==
This village has three temples. Two Shiva temples are about centuries years old which are known as Kashi Viswanatha Temple and Chamdramouleswara Temple and other one Vishnu about 25 years old. This village has chennakeshava temple which is known for the theppothsava. Jaathre is famous in this village and has 7 days pooja and activities. One Shiva temple is around 800 years old and there is a lake in front of the temple. Recently the temple got renovated (jeernoddhara) with the help of villagers and dharmastala trust. Special poojas are performed during kartika maasa, Maha Shivaratri and during all the major festivals.

== Education ==
Village has primary and higher primary school. Primary school has about 500 students and higher primary has about 300. It has a private high school and a government primary school.

== Economy ==
70% of people are dependent on agriculture. They grow ragi, rice and various types of dhal. There is a milk-collecting centre which provides livelihood for a lot of people.

== Detention Centre ==
Karnataka Detention Centre is under construction at Sondekoppa. It is planned to be operational from 1 January 2020. The centre will have a 10-feet high walls barbed wires with watchtowers in two corners of the compound.
