= Uppara =

Hindu caste of South India

- Classification: Backward Caste
- Religions: Hinduism
- Country: India
- Populated states: Andhra Pradesh; Telangana; Karnataka; Tamil Nadu

Uppara, also known as Sagara, is a Hindu caste predominantly found in the Indian states of Andhra Pradesh, Telangana, Karnataka, and Tamil Nadu. They are classified as an Other Backward Class.

Traditionally, Upparas are involved as stonecutters, tank-diggers, and earth-workers. In the past, their occupation also involved the extraction of salt from rocks, known in Telugu and Kannada as uppu and hence, they came to be called Upparas. Occupationally, Lonia of North India are considered the equivalents of Upparas.

== History ==
According to Francis Buchanan-Hamilton, the most important occupation of the Telugu Upparas at the beginning of the nineteenth century was building of mud walls, especially those of forts.

Mysore Census Reports of early 20th century noted about Upparas as follows: "This caste is divided into the Telugu and Karnataka sub-divisions. The latter make earth-salt, while the former work as bricklayers and builders. The well-to-do section of the caste further undertake public works on contract, and some of them are good architects of ordinary Hindu houses, which do not call for much scientific precision. There are also agriculturists and labourers among them."

The one-man Anantha Raman commission constituted by the Government of Andhra Pradesh in its report in 1968 made certain observations and recommendations regarding the Uppara community. Some of the points mentioned in the report are as follows:

- Upparas were previously engaged in manufacturing salt.
- When private manufacture of salt was forbidden during the British rule, the people of the community turned to other occupations. Losing their caste-based occupation as salt makers, they tuned to tank-digging, stonecutting, and agriculture.

Kumar Suresh Singh noted in 1998 that Upparas have abandoned salt-making and are primarily involved in masonry and stone-work. In the recent decades, Upparas have started calling themselves as Sagaras.

== Culture ==
Some members of the caste are Vaishnavites and others Saivites. They also worship various village deities, which vary according to the place of residence. Upparas celebrate Bhagiratha Jayanti on Ganga Saptami every year.

== Demographics ==
The Chinnappa Reddy Report (1990) indicates that the Uppara make up about 1.18 percent of the population of Karnataka.
