= Avenue Road, Bengaluru =

Commercial Street in Bangalore, India

Coordinates: 12.968300°N 77.578821°E

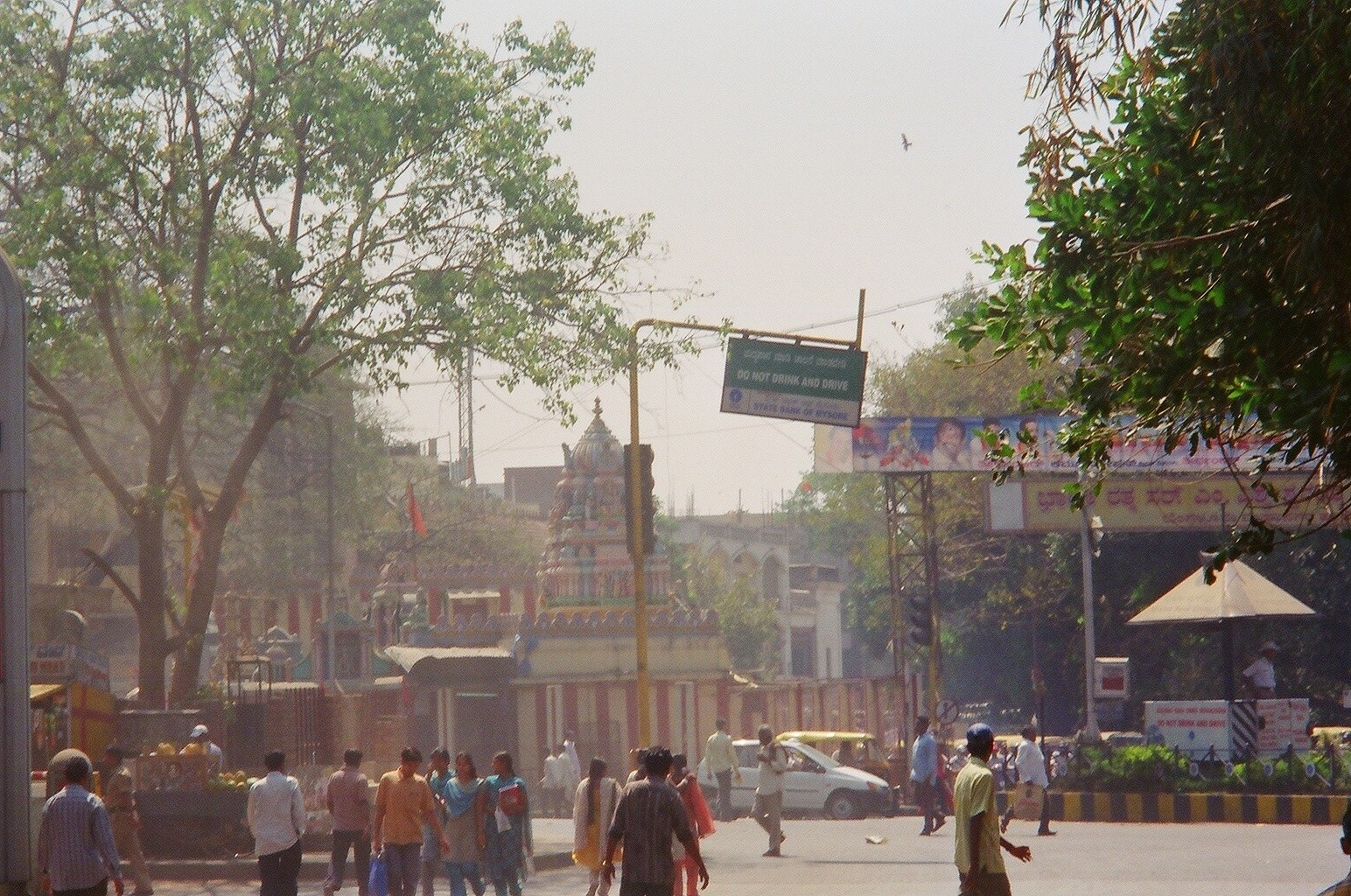
A temple at the entrance of Avenue Road

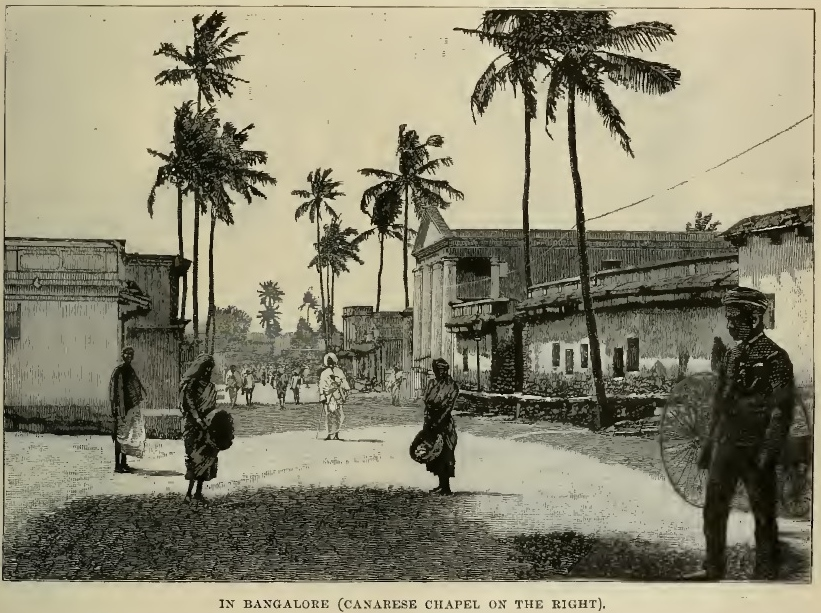
In Bangalore (Canarese Chapel on the right), 1890

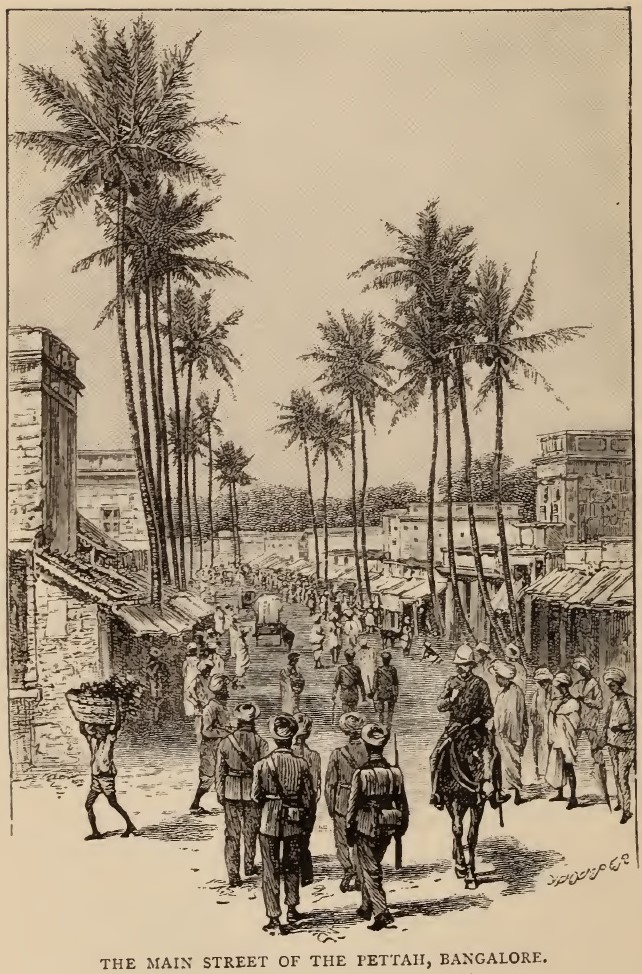
The Main Street of the Pettah, Bangalore, 1890

Avenue Road (tautological name, lit. 'Road Road') is a busy shopping and commercial street in Bangalore, the state capital of Karnataka, India. It is located in Chickpet and runs through the heart of the city. It also connects the Mysore Road and K G Road in the city. It is in close proximity to Majestic bus station and Bangalore City Railway station.

Earlier, Avenue Road was known as Doddapete.

Avenue Road is known for its traditional trade in used books, garments and textiles, jewellery and pawn brokering.

Standing on Avenue Road, Bangalore Pete is also the Rice Memorial Church, named after Rev. Benjamin Holt Rice, a missionary of the London Missionary Society (LMS), a Canarese scholar and a pioneer of education in the Bangalore Pete region. The Church stands on the grounds of the London Mission Canarese Chapel which was established in 1834, by William Campbell.

== See also ==
- Bengaluru Pete
- Rice Memorial Church
