= Gavi Gangadhareshwara Temple =

16th century Hindu temple in Bengaluru, India

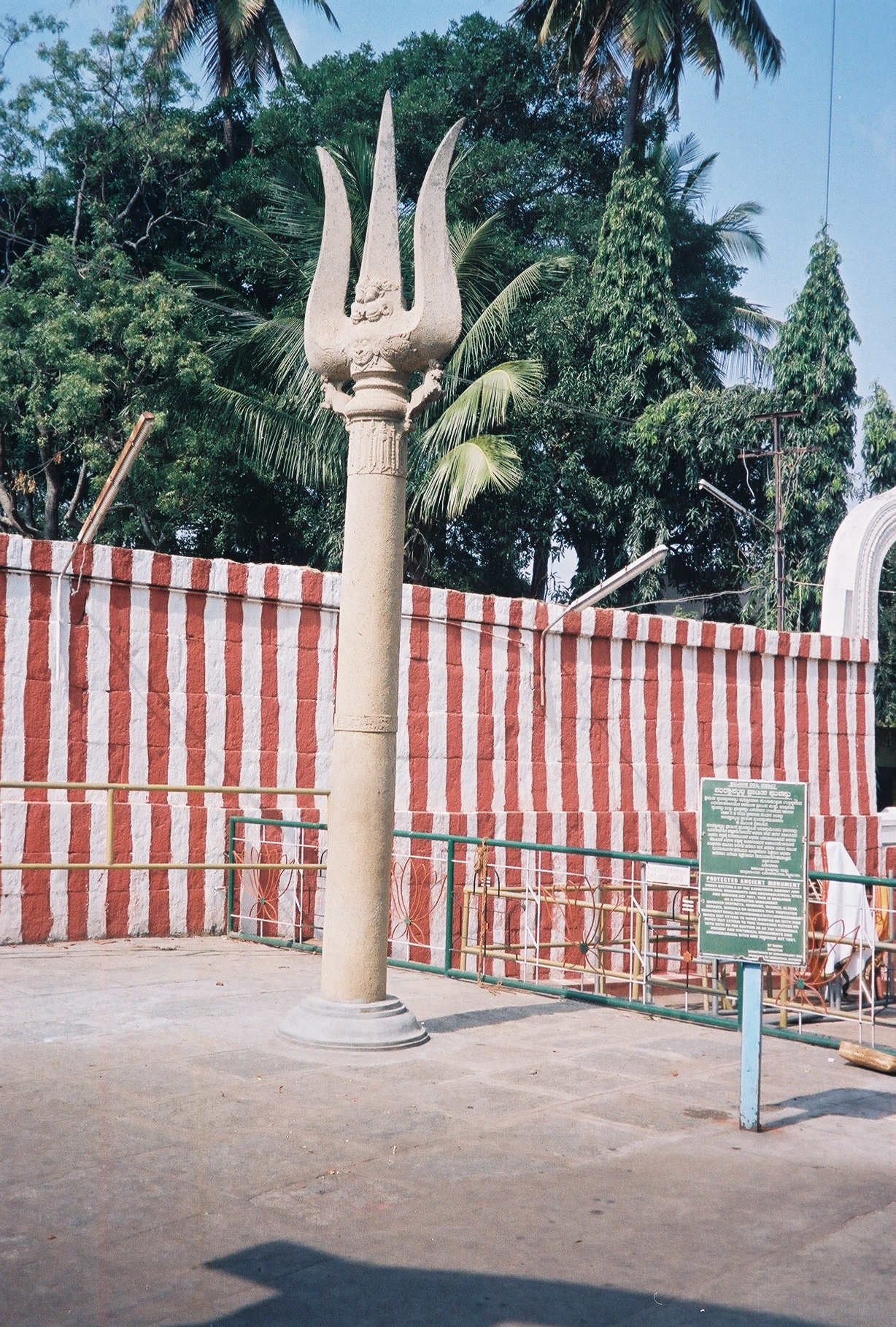
- A Trident of Lord Shiva outside the Gavi Gangadhareshwara temple at Bengaluru.

- Location within Bengaluru

Religion
- Affiliation: Hinduism
- District: Bengaluru
- Deity: Shiva as Gavi Gangadhareshwara
- Festivals: Maha Shivaratri, Makara Sankranti

Location
- Location: Gavipuram
- State: Karnataka
- Country: India
- Interactive map of Gavi Gangadhareshwara Temple
- Coordinates: 12°56′53.5″N 77°33′46.8″E

Architecture
- Type: Indian rock-cut architecture
- Completed: 16th century CE

Gavi Gangadhareshwara Temple, or Sri Gangaadhareshwara, also Gavipuram Cave Temple, an example of Indian rock-cut architecture, is located in Bengaluru in the state of Karnataka in India. The temple is famous for its mysterious stone discs in the forecourt and the exact planning allowing the sun to shine on the shrine during certain time of the year. It was built in the 16th century by Kempe Gowda I, the founder of the city.

== Temple history ==
This cave temple dedicated to Shiva. It is believed to have been built by Gautama Maharishi and Bharadwaja Muni in the Vedic period. It was later renovated in the 16th century CE by Kempe Gowda, the founder of Bengaluru.

One of the oldest temples in Bengaluru, Gavi Gangadhareshwara temple was built by Kempe Gowda in recognition after being released from a prison term of five years by Rama Raya. The temple Gavi is an architectural marvel that attracts the faithful by the hordes.

== Temple architecture ==
Built in a natural cave in Gavipuram, the temple is dedicated to Lord Shiva and cut into a monolithic stone. The courtyard of the temple contains several monolithic sculptures. The main attractions of Gavi Gangadhareshvara temple are two granite pillars that support the giant disk of the sun and moon, and two pillars having several carvings of Nandi in a sitting posture at the top. The temple is also known for its four monolithic pillars, representing Damaru, Trishul and two large circular discs on the patio.

Two paintings dated 1 May 1792 CE by Thomas and William Daniell brothers shows that the temple has gone through some construction work with new walls and enclosures.

== Deities inside the Temple ==
The temple complex has numerous shrines for various detities in addition to the main deity Gavi Gangadhareswara.

- Parvati Devi
- Vinayaka
- Subramanya
- Gautama Maharishi
- Bharadwaja Muni
- Chandikeswara
- Uma Maheswara
- Vallabha Ganapathi
- Durga Devi
- Agni Deva
- Sapthamatrikas
- Dakshinamurthy
- Kala Bhairava
- Veerabhadra
- Lakshmi Narayana
- Surya and Chandra
- Ayyappa
- Anjaneya
- Mahaganapati
- Subramanya with Valli and Devasena
- Navagrahas

== Special aspects of the Temple ==
=== Curative effects ===
The idol of Agnimurthi inside the temple has two heads, seven hands and three legs. It is believed that worship of the deity would cure defects of the eye.

=== Illumination of sanctum by the Sun ===
On the occasion of Makar Sankranti, the temple witnesses a unique phenomenon in the evening where sunlight passes through an arc between the horns of Nandi and falls directly on the linga inside the cave and illuminating the interior idol for an hour. Lakhs of devotees come in mid January every year on Makar sankranti day to this cave temple.

Comparison of contemporary structures and earlier drawings by Thomas Daniell and William Daniell show that earlier the temple had fewer structures and the Sun illuminated the shrine in summer and winter solstice. Of late, the Sun illuminates Shivalinga two times per year - from 13 to 16 January in late afternoons and from 26 November to 2 December.

=== Tunnel from temple ===
People believe that there is a tunnel which may lead to Kashi. However, it is believed that two men named Nishant and Prem went into the tunnel and never returned.

== Protected temple ==
The temple shrine is a protected monument under the Karnataka Ancient and Historical Monuments, and Archaeological Sites and Remains Act 1961.

== Gallery ==
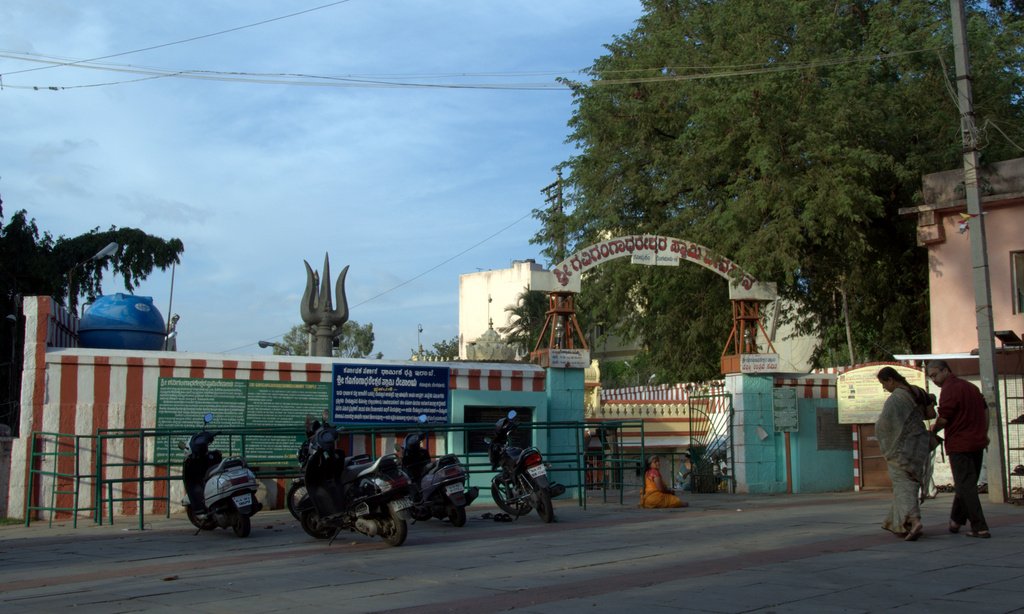
Temple's front entrance

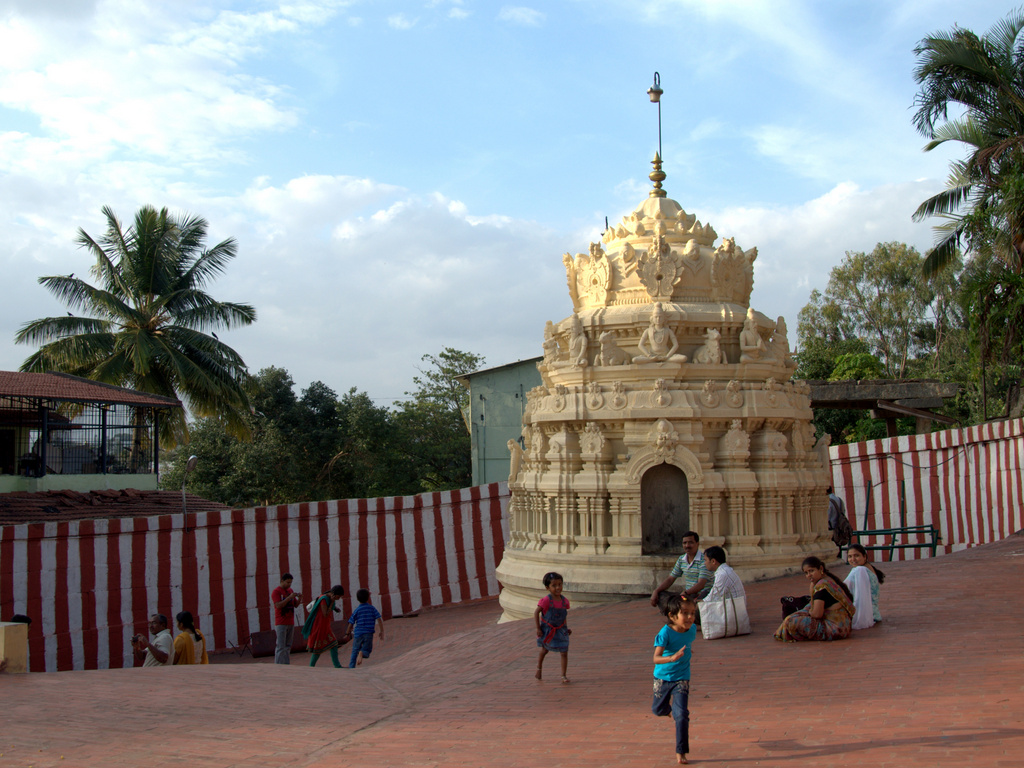
Roof top of the temple

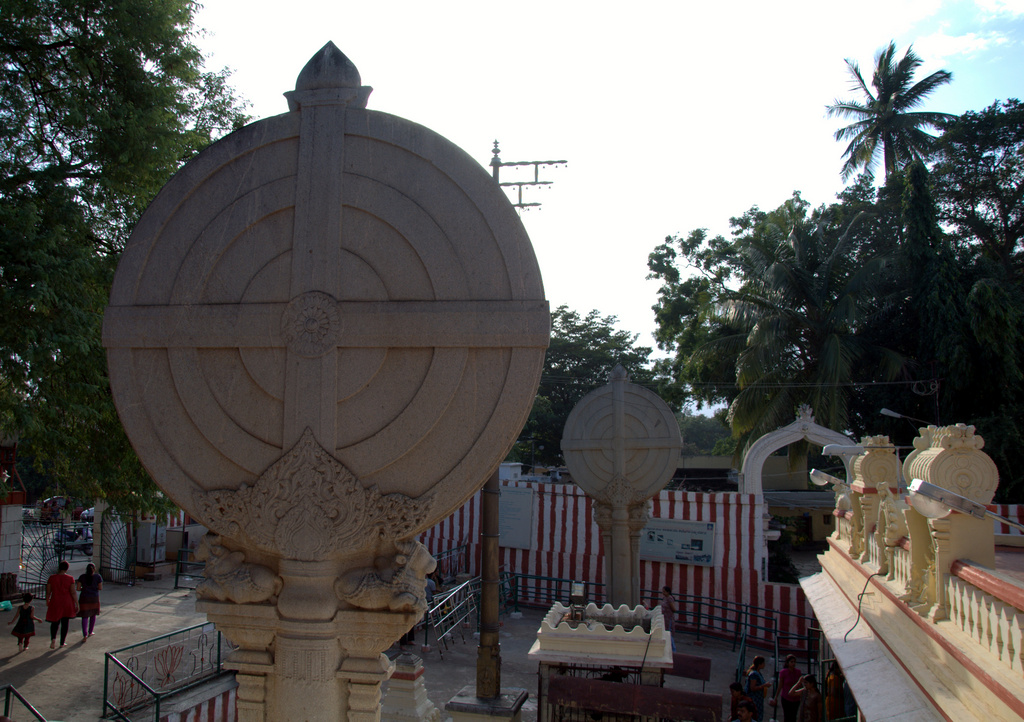
Temple yard with monolithic sculptures

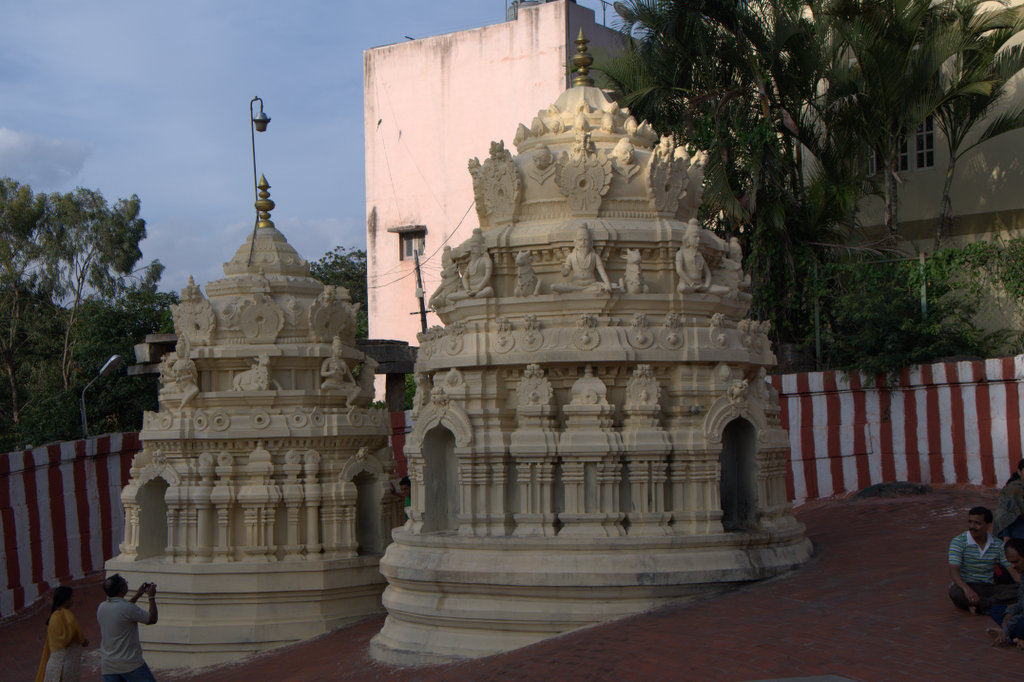
Another view of the roof top of the temple

Temple's rear entrance

== Vintage Paintings ==
The temple saw numerous colonial artists painting different scenes over the years.

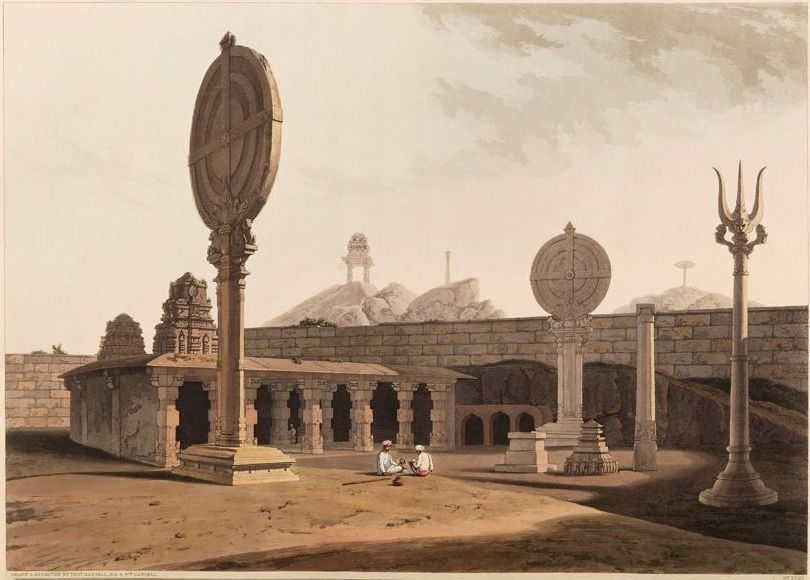
A painting of the temple by Thomas Daniell in 1792.

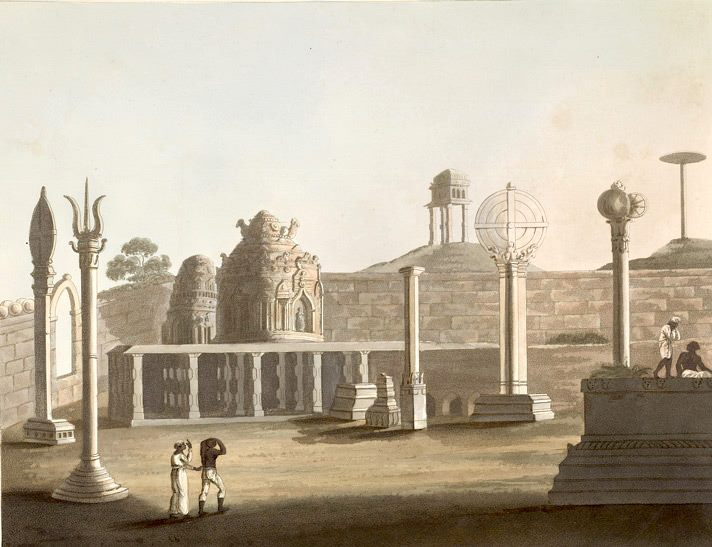
A painting of the temple by James Hunter, published posthumously in 1804.

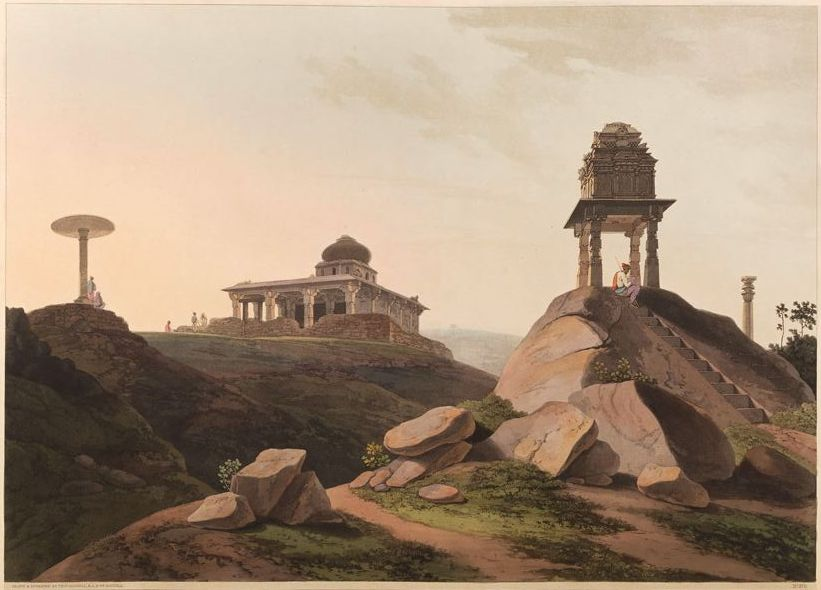
A painting depicting the Harihara temple and great stone umbrella on the Harihararayana Gudda (hill) in 1792.

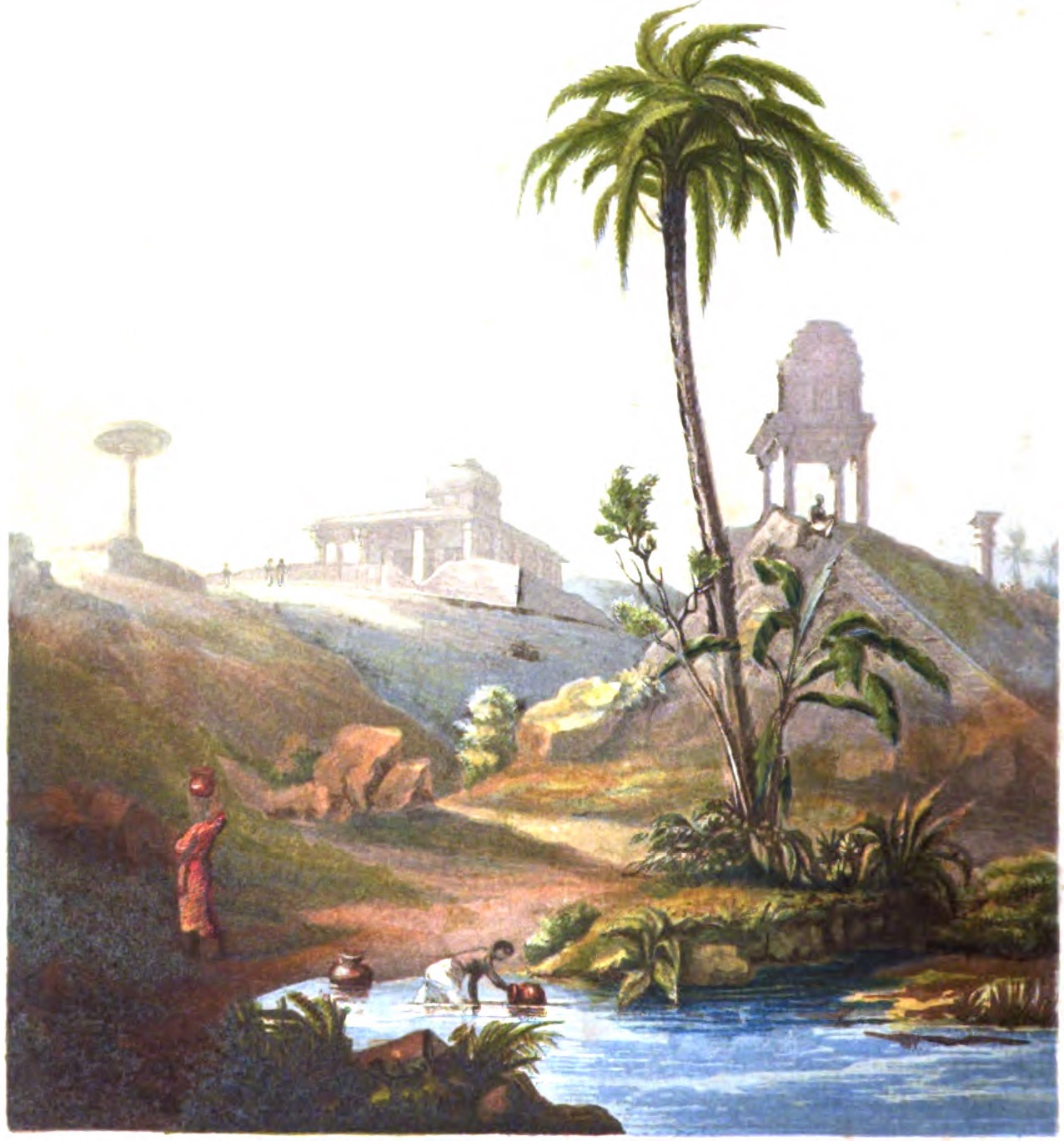
View from the Hepern House, Bangalore (Campbell, 1839)

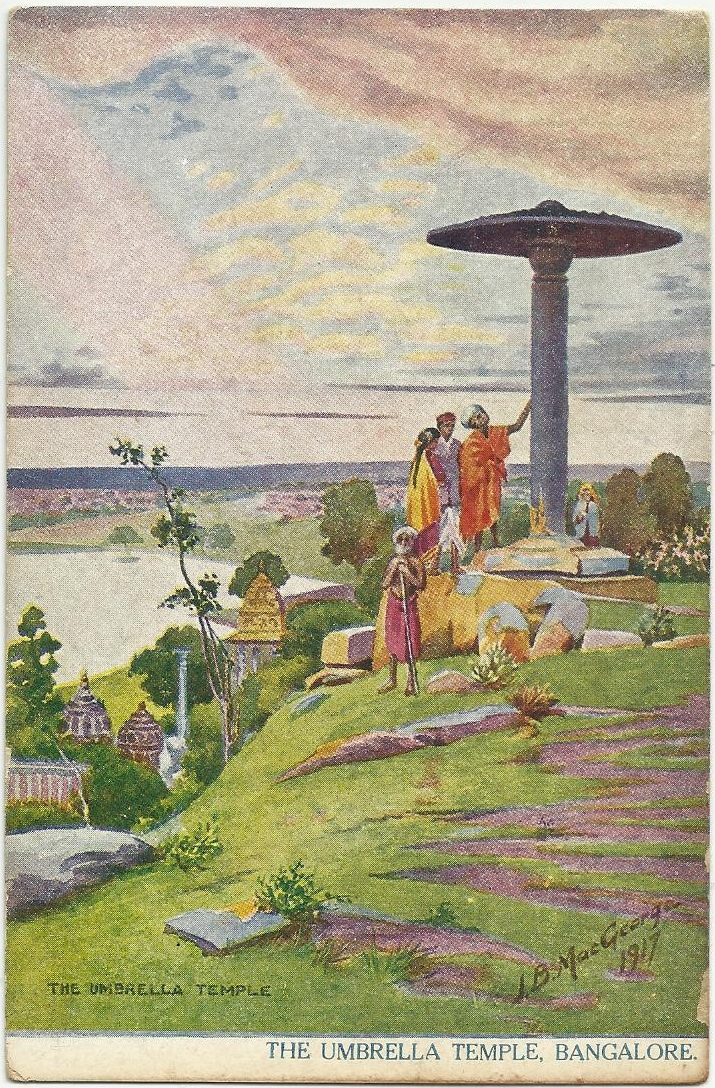
A painting by Lieutenant Colonel J B MacGeorge titled "The Umbrella Temple" in 1917.

== Nearby holy places ==
- Gosaayi Math
- Samadhi of yogi Bjt Narayan Maharaj - Located just behind the temple.
- Sri Bande Mahakali Temple

== See also ==
- Bhaja Caves
- Varaha Cave Temple
- Undavalli caves
- Badami Cave Temples
- Nellitheertha Cave Temple
- Pandavleni Caves
- Karla Caves
- Elephanta Caves
- Indian rock-cut architecture
- Hulimavu cave temple
