= Ganiga =

Hindu Religious caste

Ganiga is a caste found in the state of Karnataka, India. They were originally oil pressers and also oil-mongers in the Mysore region of Karnataka. They add the title Shetty to their name.

Ganiga men used to wear sacred thread. They hold themselves to be high class Vaishyas and did not eat food cooked by anyone other than Havyaka Brahmins. They employed Havyaka Brahmins to perform their chief ceremonies and their religious teacher is the chief of Vaishnava monastery at Abbur-Channapatna -Head quarters. Somakshatriya Ganigas belong to Kundapura Vyasaraja Peetham. They are classified as OBC in India's system of positive discrimination. Subcastes of Ganiga include Kala, Ketna, Kiru, Negu, Panjari, and Galiana.
