= Chickpet =

Neighbourhood in Bangalore, Karnataka, India

Chickpete Chickpete
- Neighbourhood
- Location within Bengaluru
- Coordinates: 12.97186°N 77.57721°E
- Country: India
- State: Karnataka
- District: Bangalore Urban
- Metro: Bangalore

Languages
  - Official: Kannada
- Time zone: UTC+5:30 (IST)
- PIN: 560053
- Telephone code: 080
- ISO 3166 code: IN-KA
- Vehicle registration: KA 05
- Website: karnataka.gov.in

Chickpete is a wholesale/retail neighborhood in Bengaluru, India. It houses one of the smallest roads as artery roads in entire Bangalore city. It is one of the city's oldest areas and is famous for its cloth Shops and wholesale businesses. It is near the Electric Market area in Bangalore and is a part of the Bangalore South Lok Sabha constituency. Its roots go back to the 16th century. It is also said that Shivaji had spent early years of his childhood in Bengaluru with his father Shahaji Raje Bhosale. And his palace was there in the area which is known today as Chikkapete. Today the locality is home to the second largest Marwadi community in South india after Sowcarpet in Chennai.

== See also ==
- Bangalore South (Lok Sabha constituency)
- Temples in Chickpet
