= Cultural depictions of Edward VII =

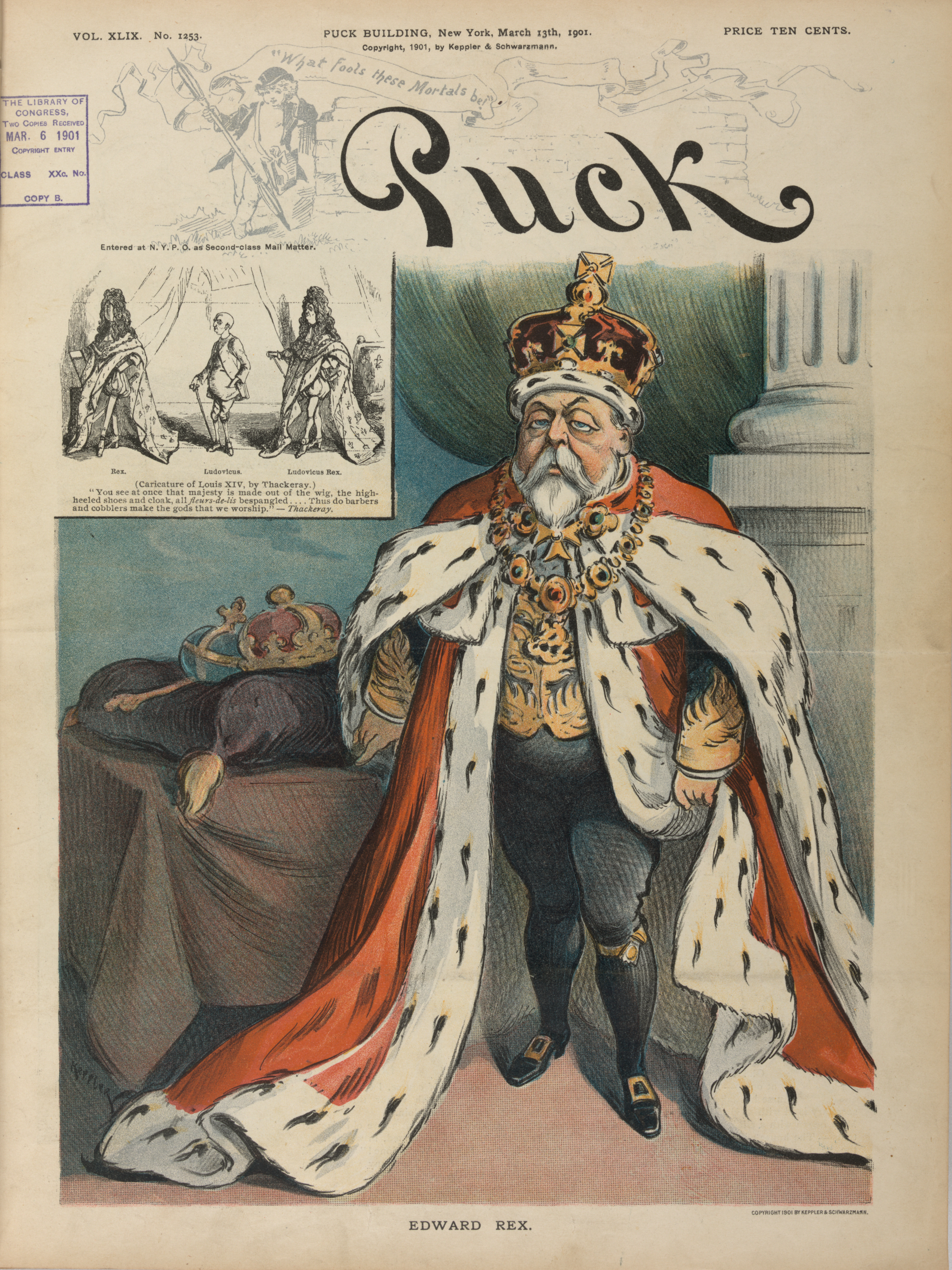
Edward VII caricatured by Puck magazine, 1901

King Edward VII of the United Kingdom has been depicted a number of times in different media and popular culture.

== Literature ==
- King Edward appears in the fantasy novel The Master Key by L. Frank Baum, which came out in 1901, the first year of his reign
- King Edward is a character in George MacDonald Fraser's novel Mr. American, and also appears in Flashman and the Tiger by the same author.
- Edward appears as the narrator and detective protagonist in three period mysteries by Peter Lovesey, Bertie and the Tinman, Bertie and the Seven Bodies, and Bertie and the Crime of Passion.
- King Edward appears in The Question and The Dream Kingdom, Volumes 25 and 26 respectively of The Morland Dynasty, a series of historical novels by author Cynthia Harrod-Eagles. These two novels are set during his reign and some of the characters in the series are part of his 'set' during his wild young days; others assist him on diplomatic missions when he is King.
- Appears, when still Prince of Wales, as a minor character in the historical-mystery novel Stone's Fall, by Iain Pears.
- King Edward appears in Peter and the Sword of Mercy (2009), the fourth volume of the Starcatchers series by Dave Barry and Ridley Pearson.

== Film ==
On film, Edward has been portrayed by:

- Aubrey Dexter in Sixty Glorious Years (1938)
- Alfred Bernau in Ohm Krüger (1941)
- Edwin Maxwell in the comedy Holy Matrimony (1943)
- Stuart Holmes in The Lodger (1944)
- Cecil Kellaway in Mrs. Parkington (1944)
- Leslie Denison in The Great John L. (1945)
- Ian Murray in the comedy western The First Traveling Saleslady (1956)
- Laurence Naismith in The Trials of Oscar Wilde (1960)
- James Robertson Justice in Mayerling (1968)
- Reginald Marsh in Young Winston (1972)
- David Brierly in the comedy On the Game (1974)
- Victor Langley in the Sherlock Holmes/Jack the Ripper film Murder by Decree (1979)
- Michael Cronin in the short Le Petomane (1979)
- Ian McNeice in 1871 (1990)
- Christopher Guest as Corky St. Clair playing King Edward in Red, White and Blaine within Waiting for Guffman (1996)
- David Westhead in Mrs. Brown (1997)
- Eddie Izzard in Victoria & Abdul (2017)

Harry Smith stated of his film Heaven and Earth Magic: "The first part depicts the heroine's toothache consequent to the loss of a valuable watermelon, her dentistry and transportation to heaven. Next follows an elaborate exposition of the heavenly land in terms of Israel, Montreal and the second part depicts the return to earth from being eaten by Max Müller on the day Edward the Seventh dedicated the Great Sewer of London."

== Statues ==
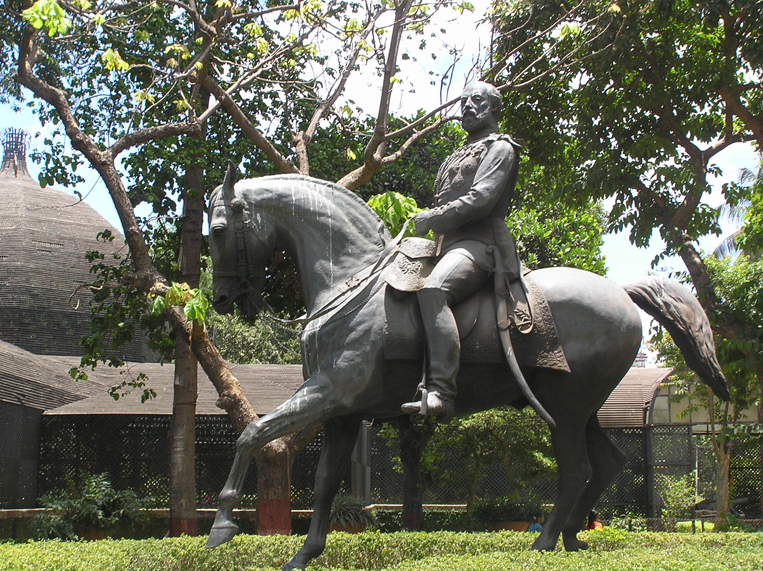
The famous Kala Ghoda (Black Horse) statue of Bombay

Edward was commemorated in many public statues for the United Kingdom, Australia, and the Indian subcontinent. Notable amongst those sent to India were the colossal bronze statue by Sir Joseph Edgar Boehm (1879) for Bombay's Esplanade which became known as the Kala Ghoda (Black Horse). The figure originally stood on a 16 ft. plinth with relief panels celebrating the Prince's first visit to Bombay. The total cost of the work was £12,500. On August 15, 1965, the statue was moved to the Zoological Gardens in Mumbai without its plinth and reliefs. Others such as Francis Derwent Wood's bronze statue was commissioned for Patiala. The confident standing figure wears the costume of the Field Marshal consisting of an open overcoat, thigh-high riding boots, embroidered jacket with medals along with a Field-Marshal's hat and a short staff.

One of the most magnificent statues to Edward VII was completed by Sir Thomas Brock RA for Delhi. Despite Brock going to work immediately, the statue was not shipped to Delhi until 1919 when it was erected in King Edward Park (Netaji Subhash Park). The figure stands 14 ft. tall and weights 5 tonnes, the king riding his favorite, Kildare. Once again the king is portrayed in his Field Marshal's uniform, braids and honours across his chest. The statue was taken down in 1967 and in 1968 Canadian authorities negotiated for it to be moved to Queen's Park in Toronto for a payment of £10,000 where it currently stands. Other extant statues of Edward VII in India is the Cubbon Park Statue by Leonard Jennings and a bronze equestrian statue at Victoria Memorial by Bertram Mackennal.

The King Edward VII Memorial by Albert Toft is located in Centenary Square, Birmingham. The Peace Statue in Brighton is a memorial to Edward VII and includes a relief portrait of him. Other statues stand across the United Kingdom, India, South Africa, Australia and Canada.

== Television ==
Portrayals of Edward on television include:

- Sebastian Cabot in an episode of the TV series Telephone Time entitled "Recipe for Success" (1958)
- Kevin Brennan in an episode of the Granada Television series On Trial entitled "The Baccarat Scandal" (1960)
- Terry Jones (as the Prince of Wales) in Monty Python's Flying Circus 'Oscar Wilde' sketch (1972)
- Robert Downing in the American drama Victoria Regina (1961), based on the play by Laurence Housman
- Lockwood West in an episode of the LWT drama series Upstairs, Downstairs entitled "Guest of Honour" (1972), in which the king visited the household for dinner, and in the BBC drama series The Life and Times of David Lloyd George (1981)
- Thorley Walters in the BBC drama series The Edwardians (1972) and Lloyd George (1973), and the Thames Television drama series Jennie: Lady Randolph Churchill (1974)
- Edward Hardwicke in the BBC drama series The Pallisers (1974), based on the novels by Anthony Trollope; Hardwicke's mother, Helena Pickard, played Edward VII's mother, Queen Victoria, in the 1951 film The Lady with the Lamp
- Derek Francis in the BBC drama series Fall of Eagles (1974)
- Timothy West in the ATV drama series Edward the Seventh (1975). In early episodes he is portrayed by Simon Gipps-Kent as a boy and Charles Sturridge as a teenager
- Ronnie Barker in "The Phantom Raspberry Blower" serial, The Two Ronnies (1976). In one sketch Edward (still Prince of Wales) is suspected of being the mysterious, titular raspberry-blower. A reference to the conspiracy theory that holds Edward's son, Prince Albert Victor, Duke of Clarence and Avondale, responsible for the Jack the Ripper murders.
- Roger Hammond in the BBC drama series The Duchess of Duke Street (1976)
- Denis Lill in the LWT drama series Lillie (1978), telling the story of Lillie Langtry
- Peter Ustinov in the RTÉ drama series Strumpet City (1980), based on the novel by James Plunkett
- Richard Huggett in the BBC drama series Nancy Astor (1982)
- Wensley Pithey in the episode of the Yorkshire Television drama series Number 10 entitled "The Asquiths" (1983)
- Joss Ackland in the Sherlock Holmes drama Incident at Victoria Falls (1991)
- Geoffrey Bateman in the CBS drama Buffalo Girls (1995), based on the novel by Larry McMurtry
- Christopher Pulford and (as a boy) Simon Quarterman in the miniseries Victoria & Albert (2001)
- Michael Gambon in the BBC serial The Lost Prince (2003)
- Simon Russell Beale in the BBC drama The Young Visiters (2003)
- Peter Whittington in the BBC drama documentary "The Sewer King", an episode of Seven Wonders of the Industrial World (2003) about Joseph Bazalgette
- David Calder in Mr. Selfridge, Season One, Episode 10 (2013)
- As a young boy depicted by Mac Jackson (series 2, 2017) and Laurie Shepherd (series 3, 2019) in the ITV and Masterpiece series Victoria.
