= Macrobius =

5th-century Roman author and historian

Macrobius Ambrosius Theodosius, usually referred to as Macrobius (fl. c. AD 400), was a Roman provincial who lived during the early fifth century, during late antiquity, the period of time corresponding to the later Roman Empire, and when Latin was as widespread as Greek among the elite. He is primarily known for his writings, which include the widely copied and read Commentarii in Somnium Scipionis ("Commentary on the Dream of Scipio") about Somnium Scipionis, which was one of the most important sources for Neoplatonism in the Latin West during the Middle Ages; the Saturnalia, a compendium of ancient Roman religious and antiquarian lore; and De differentiis et societatibus graeci latinique verbi ("On the Differences and Similarities of the Greek and Latin Verb"), which is now lost.

== Name ==
Macrobius's given name (praenomen) is unrecorded as is his family name (nomen). His recorded name is a series of three surnames (cognomina), properly ordered Macrobius Ambrosius Theodosius. This is what appears in the earliest surviving manuscripts of the Saturnalia and how he is addressed in the excerpts from his lost De Differentiis. He is called "Macrobius Theodosius" in both Cassiodorus and Boethius and was apparently known during his lifetime as "Theodosius": The dedication of De Differentiis is "Theodosius to his Symmachus" (Theodosius Symmacho suo) and he may be the one addressed as "most excellent Theodosius" (Theodosi optime) in a dedicatory epistle to Avianus's Fables. This was mistakenly reversed in later manuscripts to "Ambrosius Theodosius Macrobius", which James Willis then used in his edition of the Commentary.

== Life ==
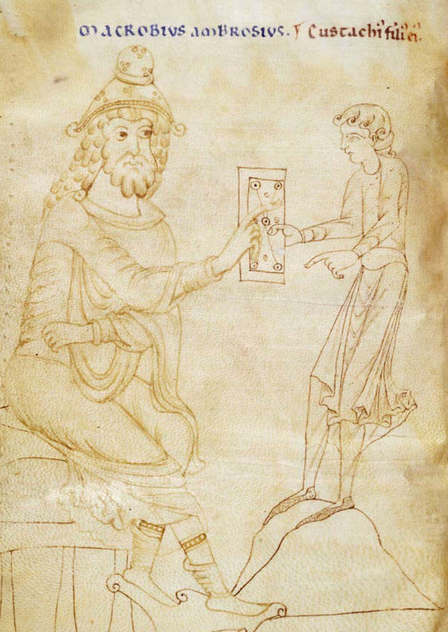
Macrobius presenting his work to his son Eustachius. From an 1100 copy of Macrobius' "Commentary on the «Dream of Scipio»".

Little is known for certain about Macrobius, but there are many theories and speculations about him. He states at the beginning of his Saturnalia that he was "born under a foreign sky" (sub alio ortus caelo), and both of his major works are dedicated to his son, Eustachius. Alan Cameron notes that several of the earliest manuscripts of his works spell his son's name Eustathius, then after pointing out that a certain Plotinus Eustathius was Urban prefect in 462 observes "Plotinus would be a peculiarly appropriate name for a neoplatonist philosopher and keen admirer of the great Lycopolitan (cf. Comm. I, 8, 5) to have given his son." There is also a Macrobius Plotinus Eudoxius who collaborated with Memmius Symmachus over an edition of Macrobius' Commentary. His major works have led experts to assume that he was a pagan.

Which "foreign sky" Macrobius was born under has been the subject of much speculation. Terrot Glover considers Macrobius either an ethnic Greek, or born in one of the Greek-speaking parts of the Roman Empire, such as Egypt, due to his intimate knowledge of Greek literature. J. E. Sandys went further and argued that Macrobius was born in one of the Greek provinces. However other experts, beginning with Ludwig van Jan, point out that despite his familiarity with Greek literature Macrobius was far more familiar with Latin than Greek—as evidenced by his enthusiasm for Vergil and Cicero—and favor North Africa, which was part of the Latin-speaking portion of the Roman Empire.

Scholars have attempted to identify him with a Macrobius who is mentioned in the Codex Theodosianus as a praetorian prefect of Spain (399–400), and a proconsul of Africa (410). The Codex Theodosianus also records a praepositus (or lord chamberlain) named Macrobius in 422. A number of older authorities go so far as to identify Macrobius the author with the first, and date his floruit to 399–410. There are objections to either identification: as Alan Cameron notes, the complete name of the first candidate is attested in an inscription to be "Flavius Macrobius Maximianus", while the second is excluded because "A praepositus must at this period have been a eunuch."

However, since Macrobius is frequently referred to as vir clarissimus et inlustris (lit. ''most famous and illustrious man''), a title which was achieved by holding public office, we can reasonably expect his name to appear in the Codex Theodosianus. Further, Cameron points out that during his lifetime Macrobius was referred to as "Theodosius", and looking for that name Cameron found a Theodosius who was praetorian prefect of Italy in 430. "It is significant that the only surviving law addressed to this Theodosius sanctions a privilege for Africa Proconsularis on the basis of information received concerning Byzacena," Cameron notes.

== Works ==
=== Commentary on the "Dream of Scipio" ===
Macrobius's most influential book and one of the most widely cited books of the Middle Ages was a commentary on the book Dream of Scipio narrated by Cicero at the end of his Republic. The nature of the dream, in which the elder Scipio appears to his (adopted) grandson and describes the life of the good after death and the constitution of the universe from a Stoic and Neo-Platonic point of view, gave occasion for Macrobius to discourse upon the nature of the cosmos, transmitting much classical philosophy to the later Middle Ages. In astronomy, this work is noted for giving the diameter of the Sun as twice the diameter of the Earth. Of a third work On the Differences and Similarities of the Greek and Latin Verb, we possess only an abstract by a certain Johannes, doubtfully identified with Johannes Scotus Eriugena (9th century).

See editions by Ludwig von Jan (1848–1852, with a bibliography of previous editions, and commentary), Franz Eyssenhardt (1893, Teubner text), James Willis (1994, new Teubner), and R. A. Kaster (OCT and Loeb, 2011); on the sources of the Saturnalia see H. Linke (1880) and Georg Wissowa (1880). The grammatical treatise will be found in Jan's edition and Heinrich Keil's Grammatici latini; see also Georg Friedrich Schömann, Commentatio macrobiana (1871).

=== Saturnalia ===
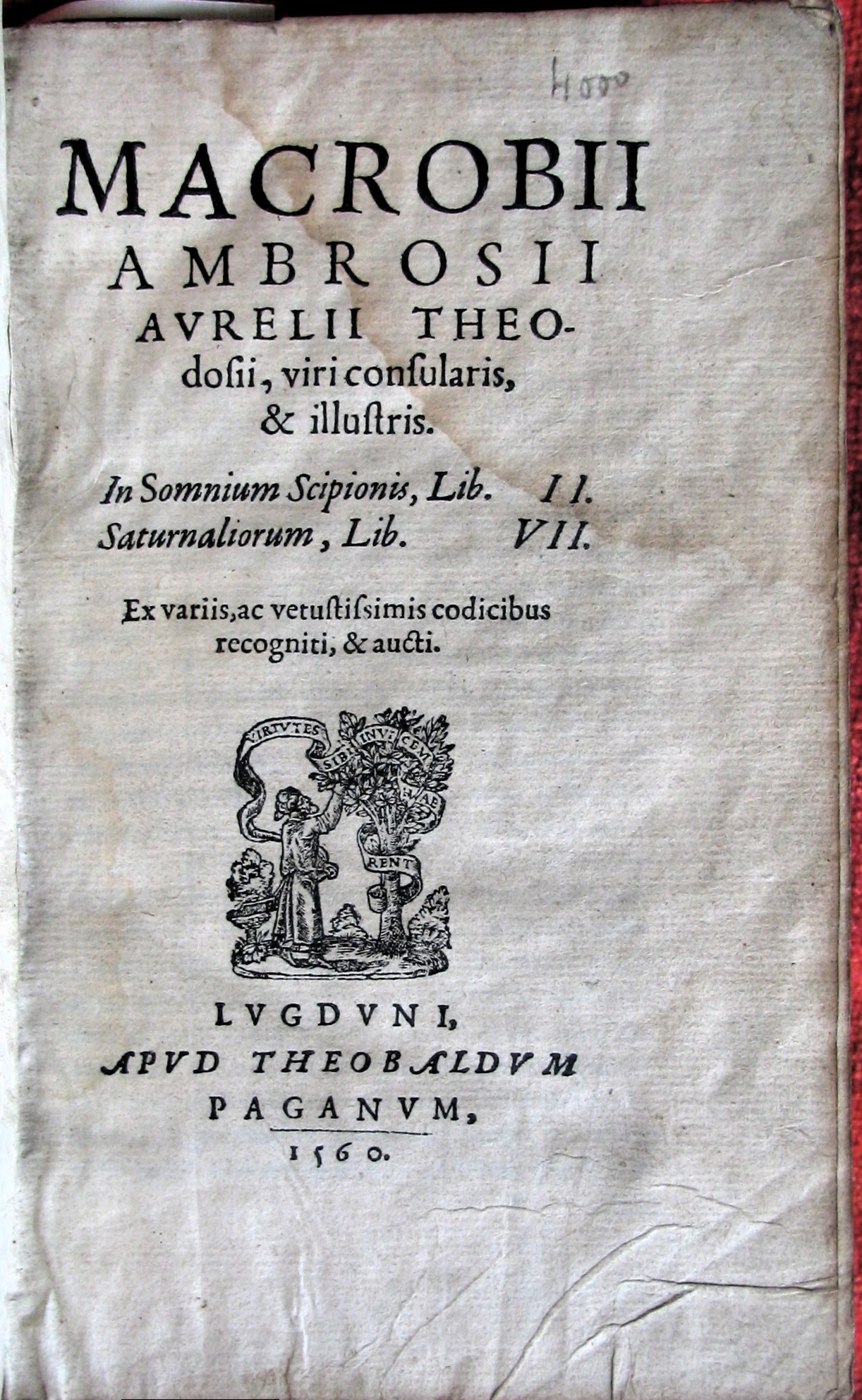
Early printed edition of Macrobius's In Somnium Scipionis and Saturnaliorum

Macrobius's Saturnalia (Latin: Saturnaliorum Libri Septem, "Seven Books of the Saturnalia") consists of an account of the discussions held at the house of Vettius Agorius Praetextatus during the holiday of the Saturnalia. It contains a great variety of curious historical, mythological, critical, antiquarian and grammatical discussions. "The work takes the form of a series of dialogues among learned men at a fictional banquet."

=== Editions and translations ===
- Robert A. Kaster (ed.), Macrobius: Saturnalia. Loeb classical library 510–512. Cambridge, MA/ London: Harvard University Press, 2011. 3 volumes.
- Percival Vaughan Davies (trans.), Macrobius: The Saturnalia. New York: Columbia University Press, 1969.
- William Harris Stahl (trans.), Macrobius: Commentary on the Dream of Scipio. New York: Columbia University Press, 1952. (Second printing, with revisions, 1966)
- Macrobius, Ambrosius Aurelius Theodosius (1400s). Seven Books of the Saturnalia: Codex from the Plutei Collection of the Biblioteca Medicea Laurenziana in Florence (in Latin). World Digital Library.

== Legacy ==
A prominent lunar crater is named after Macrobius.

Macrobius Cove in Antarctica is named after Macrobius.

== Gallery ==
Cicero's Dream of Scipio described the Earth as a globe of insignificant size in comparison to the remainder of the cosmos. Many early medieval manuscripts of Macrobius include maps of the Earth, including the antipodes, zonal maps showing the Ptolemaic climates derived from the concept of a spherical Earth and a diagram showing the Earth (labeled as globus terrae, the sphere of the Earth) at the center of the hierarchically ordered planetary spheres.

Images from a 12th-century manuscript of Macrobius's Commentarii in Somnium Scipionis (Parchment, 50 ff.; 23.9 × 14 cm; Southern France). Date: ca. 1150. Source: Copenhagen, Det Kongelige Bibliotek, ms. NKS 218 4°.

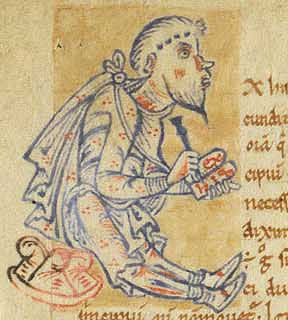
Initial E shaped in the form of a writing man, probably representing Macrobius himself

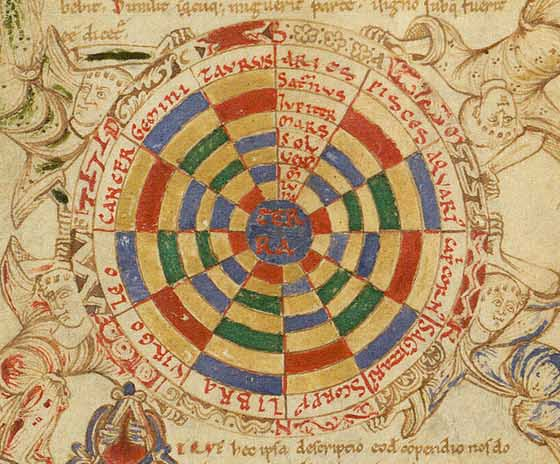
The Universe, the Earth in the centre, surrounded by the classical planets, including the sun and the moon, within the zodiacal signs

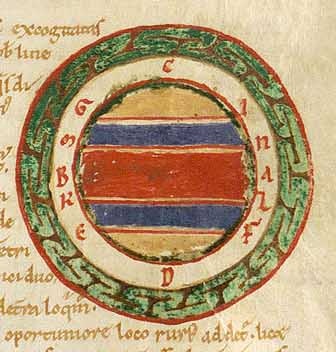
The five climes of the Earth. Frozen climes in yellow; Temperate climes in blue; Torrid clime in red.

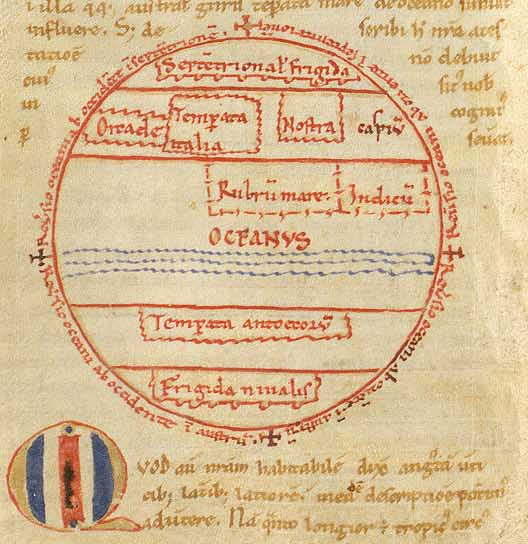
Sketch map showing the inhabited northern region separated from the antipodes by an imagined ocean at the equator

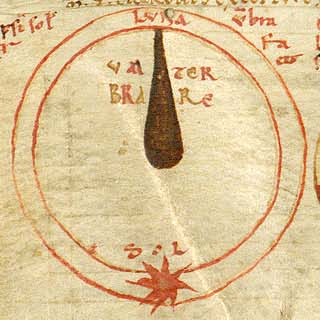
Diagram showing a lunar eclipse

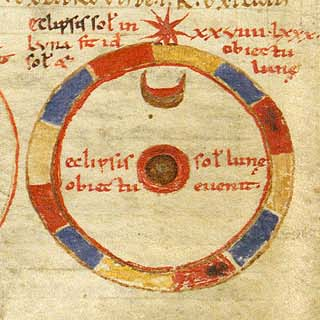
Diagram showing a solar eclipse

== In popular culture ==
Macrobius is the basis for the protagonist Manlius in Iain Pears' book The Dream of Scipio.

== See also ==
- Allegory in the Middle Ages
- Early world maps
- Mappa mundi
