= Somnium Scipionis =

Sixth book of Cicero's "De re publica"

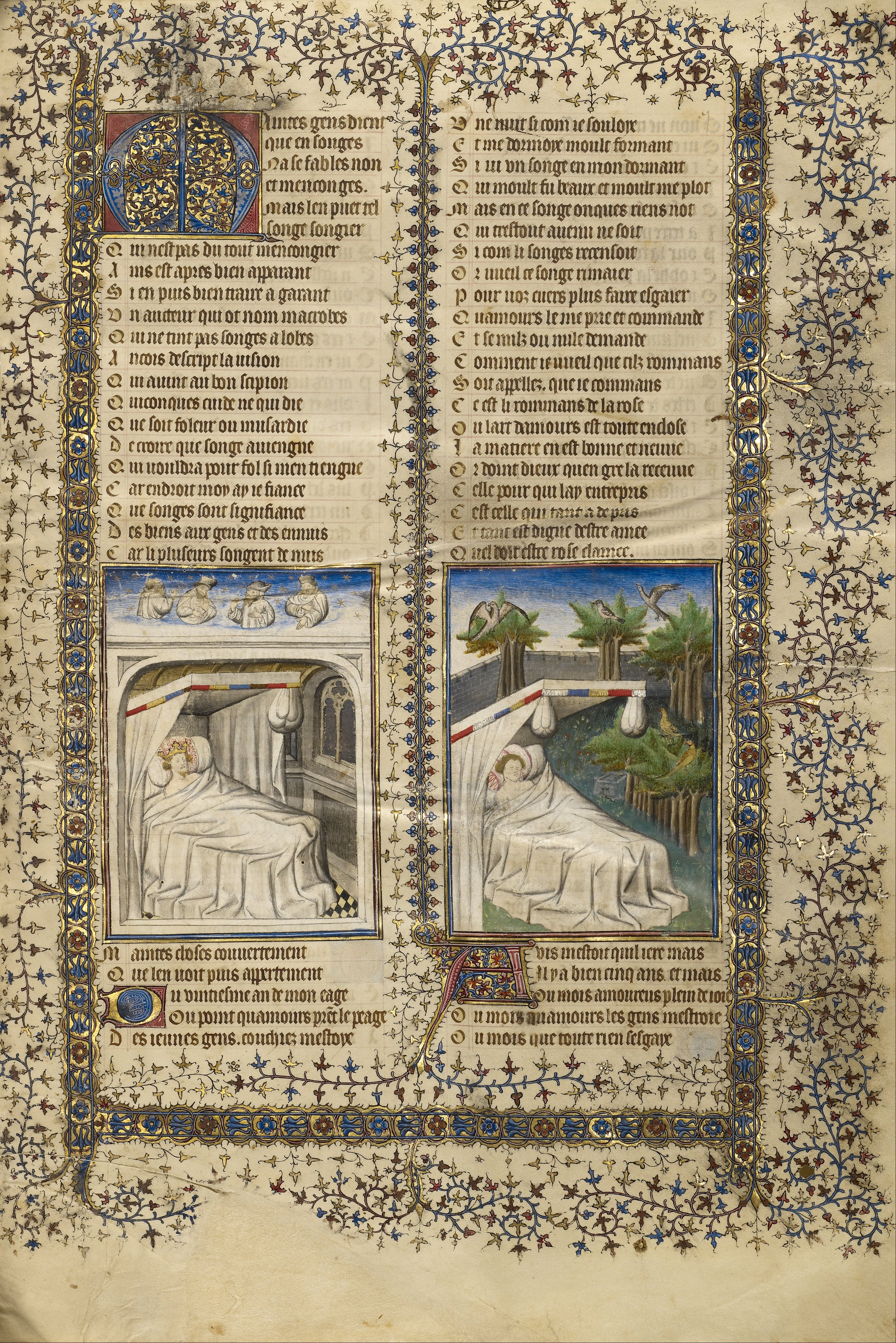
"Scipio Lying in Bed Dreaming; Guillaume de Lorris Lying in Bed Dreaming" (c. 1405)

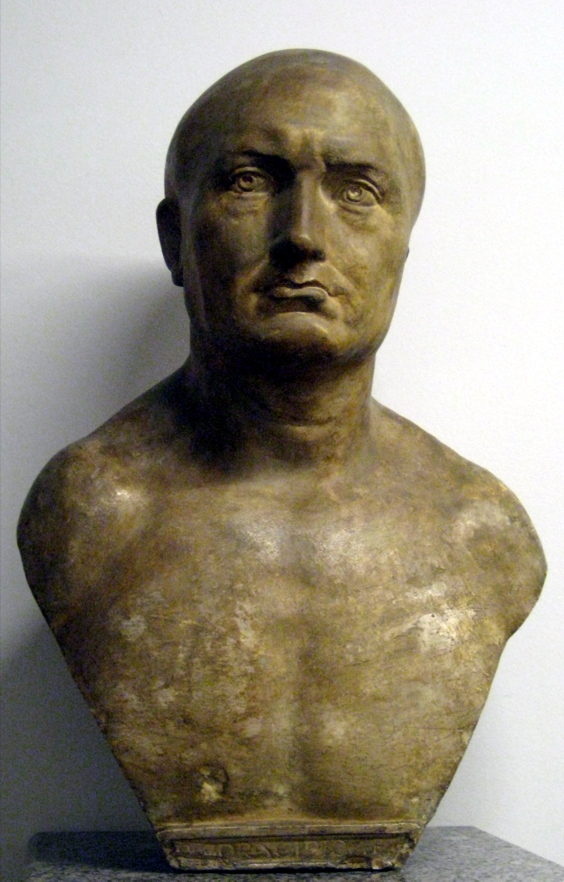
Scipio Africanus the Elder (pictured) appears to his grandson and tells him of the universe and his destiny in the Somnium Scipionis.

The Dream of Scipio (Latin: Somnium Scipionis), written by Cicero, is the sixth book of De re publica, and describes a (postulated fictional or real) dream vision of the Roman general Scipio Aemilianus, set two years before he oversaw the destruction of Carthage in 146 BC.

== Textual history ==
The Somnium Scipionis is a portion of the sixth and final book of Cicero's De re publica, but because parts of Cicero's whole work are missing, Somnium Scipionis represents nearly all that remains of the sixth book. The main reason that the Somnium Scipionis survived was because in the fifth century, the Latin writer Macrobius wrote a Neoplatonic commentary on the work, in which he excerpted large portions of Cicero. Additionally, many copies of Macrobius's work were amended with a copy of the Somnium Scipionis at their end. However, during the Middle Ages, the Somnium Scipionis became so popular that its transmission was polluted by multiple copies, and today it has been impossible to establish a stemma for it.

== Contents ==
Upon his arrival in Africa, a guest at the court of Massinissa, Scipio Aemilianus is visited by his dead grandfather-by-adoption, Scipio Africanus, hero of the Second Punic War. He finds himself looking down upon Carthage "from a high place full of stars, shining and splendid". His future is foretold by his grandfather, and great stress is placed upon the loyal duty of the Roman soldier, who will as a reward after death "inhabit... that circle that shines forth among the stars which you have learned from the Greeks to call the Milky Way". Nevertheless, Scipio Aemilianus sees that Rome is an insignificant part of the earth, which is itself dwarfed by the stars.

Then, Scipio Aemilianus sees that the universe is made up of nine celestial spheres. The earth is the innermost, whereas the highest is heaven, which "contains all the rest, and is itself the supreme God" (unus est caelestis [...] qui reliquos omnes complectitur, summus ipse deus). In between these two extremes lie the seven spheres of the Moon, Mercury, Venus, the Sun, Mars, Jupiter, and Saturn (which proceed from lowest to highest). As he stares in wonder at the universe, Scipio Aemilianus begins to hear a "so great and so sweet" (tantus et tam dulcis) sound, which Scipio Africanus identifies as the musica universalis: the "music of the spheres". He explains to his grandson that because the planets are set apart at fixed intervals, a sound is produced as they move. The moon, being the lowest sphere and the one closest to Earth, emits the lowest sound of all, whereas the heaven emits the highest. The Earth, on the other hand, does not move, remaining motionless at the center of the universe.

Then the climatic belts of the earth are observed, from the snow fields to the deserts, and there is discussion of the nature of the Divine, the soul and virtue, from the Stoic point of view.

== Relation to other works ==
The tale is modelled on the "Myth of Er" in Plato's Republic. Although the story of Er records a near-death experience, while the journey of Scipio's "disembodied soul" takes place in a dream, both give examples of belief in astral projection.

== Reception and influence ==
The literary and philosophical influence of the Somnium was great. Macrobius' Commentary upon Scipio's Dream was known to the sixth-century philosopher Boethius, and was later valued throughout the Middle Ages as a primer of cosmology. The work assumed the astrological cosmos formulated by Claudius Ptolemy. Chrétien de Troyes referred to Macrobius' work in his first Arthurian romance, Erec and Enide, and it was a model for Dante's account of heaven and hell. Chaucer referred to the work in "The Nun's Priest's Tale" and especially in the Parlement of Foules.

Some critics consider Raphael's painting Vision of a Knight to be a depiction of Scipio's Dream.

The composer Mozart, at the age of fifteen, wrote a short opera entitled Il sogno di Scipione (K. 126), with a libretto by Metastasio, based upon Scipio Aemilianus's 'soul-journey' through the cosmos.

Iain Pears wrote a historical novel called The Dream of Scipio which, though attributed to fictional classical writer Manlius, refers to Cicero's work in various direct and indirect ways.

Bernard Field, in the preface to his History of Science Fiction, cited Scipio's vision of the Earth as seen from a great height as a forerunner of modern science fiction writers describing the experience of flying in orbit — particularly noting the similarity between Scipio's realization that Rome is but a small part of the Earth with similar feeling by characters in Arthur C. Clarke's works.

This story is the basis for Chris McCully's poem "Scipio's Dream" from his collection Not Only I, published in 1996.

== Gallery ==
Images from a 12th-century manuscript of Macrobius' Commentarii in Somnium Scipionis (Parchment, 50 ff.; 23.9 × 14 cm; Southern France). Date: ca. 1150. Source: Copenhagen, Det Kongelige Bibliotek, ms. NKS 218 4°.

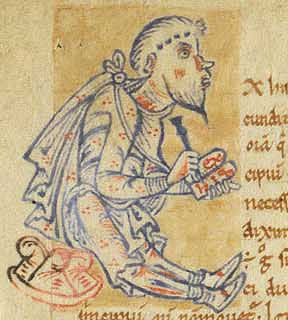
Initial E shaped in the form of a writing man, probably representing Macrobius himself.

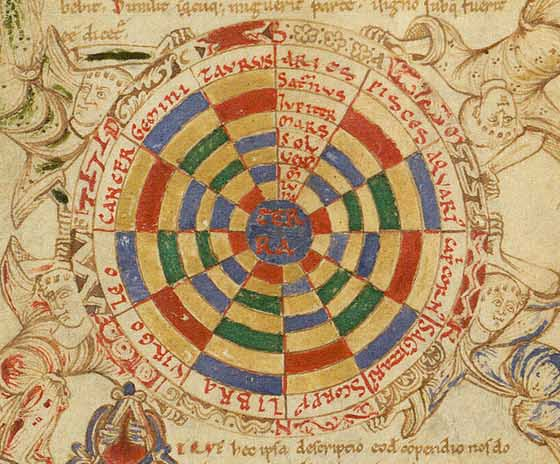
The Universe, the Earth in the centre, surrounded by the seven planets within the zodiacal signs.

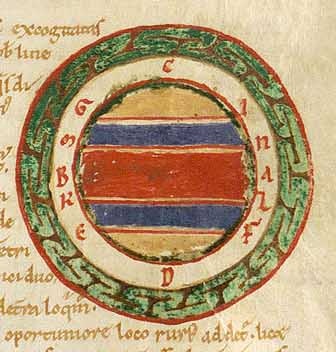
The five climes of the Earth. Frozen climes in yellow; Temperate climes in blue; Torrid clime in red.

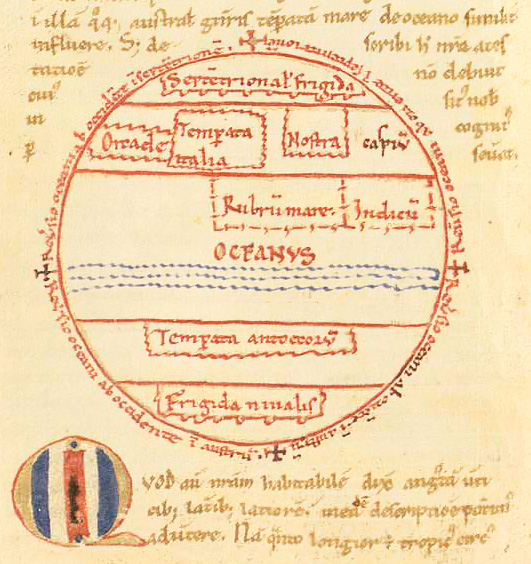
Sketch map showing the inhabited northern region separated from the antipodes by an imagined ocean at the equator.

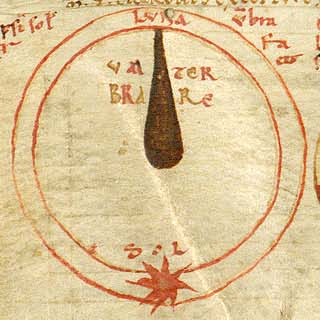
Diagram showing a lunar eclipse.

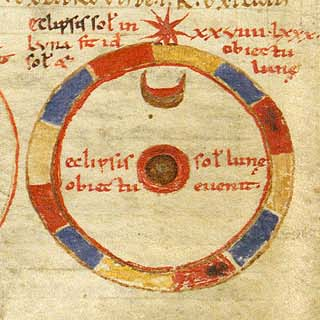
Diagram showing a solar eclipse.

Images from other manuscripts of Macrobius' Commentarii in Somnium Scipionis:

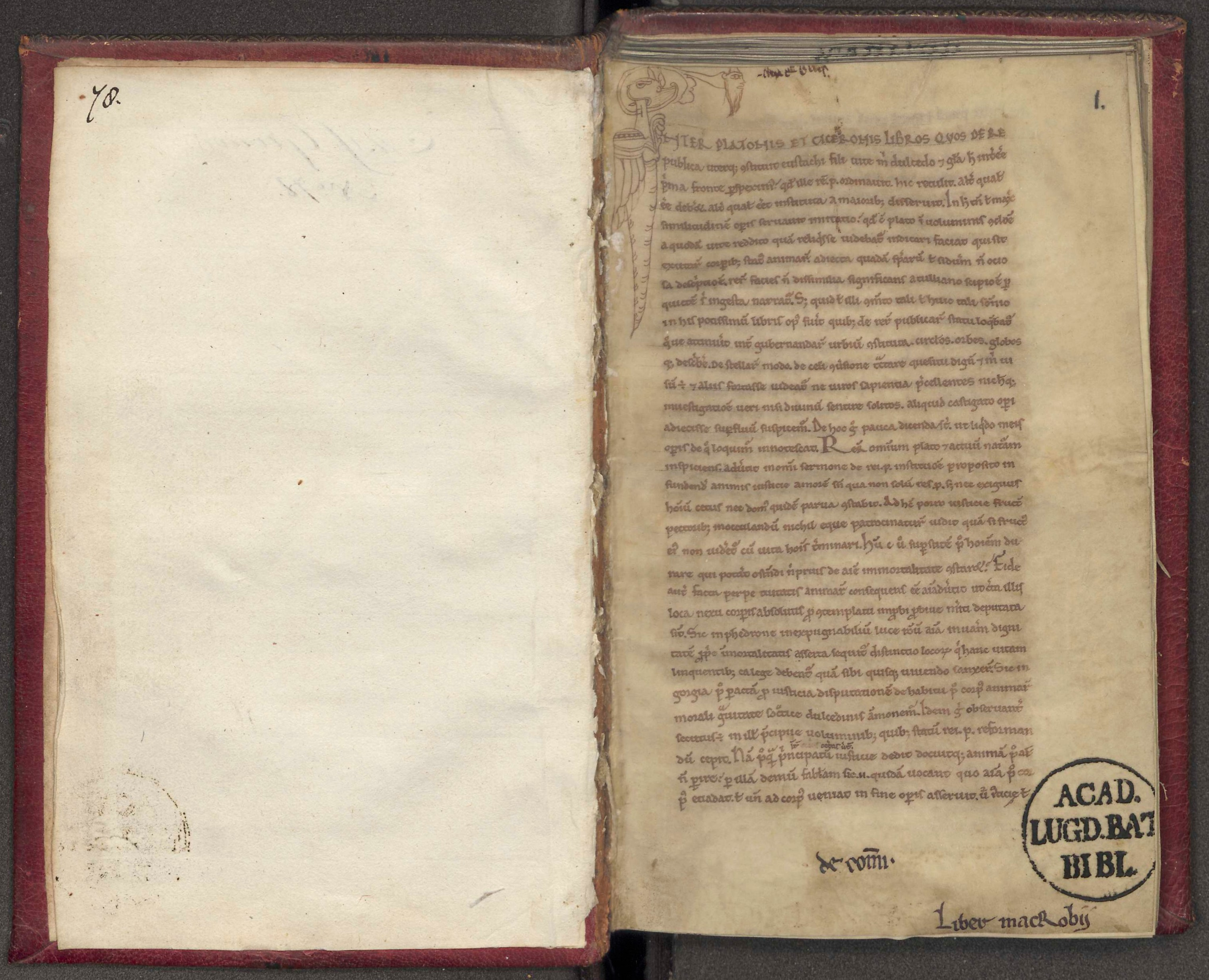
12th century English manuscript. First page from Leiden Gronovius 78.

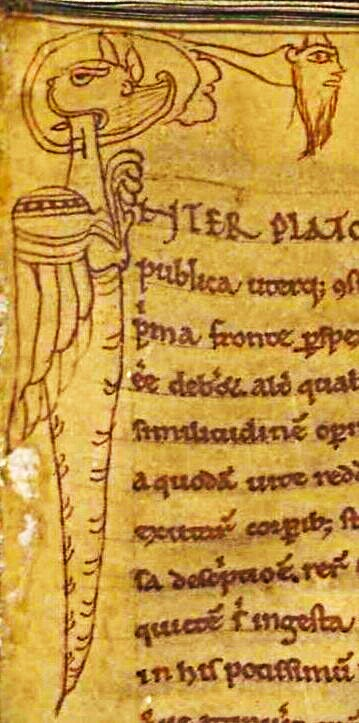
Initial monster doodle in first line, "Inter de platonis et ciceronis libros quos de republica...", same.

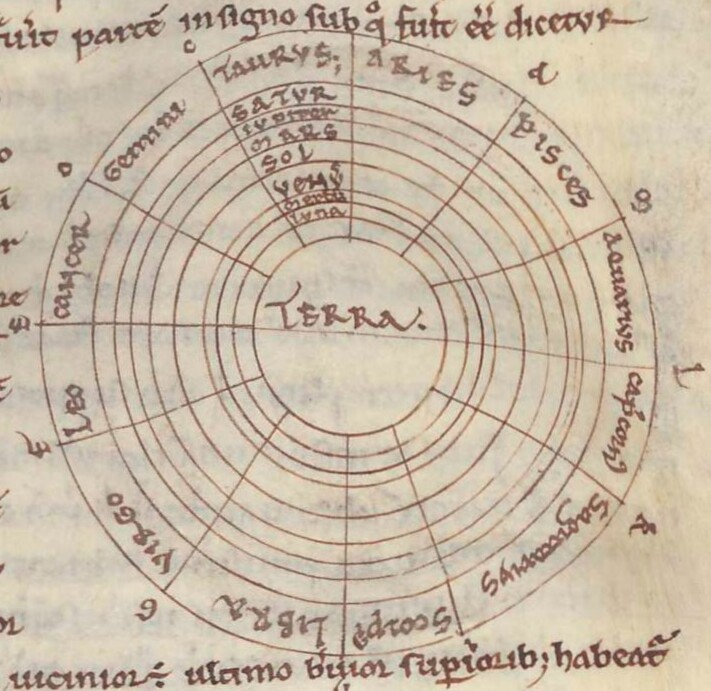
Solar system and zodiac, same

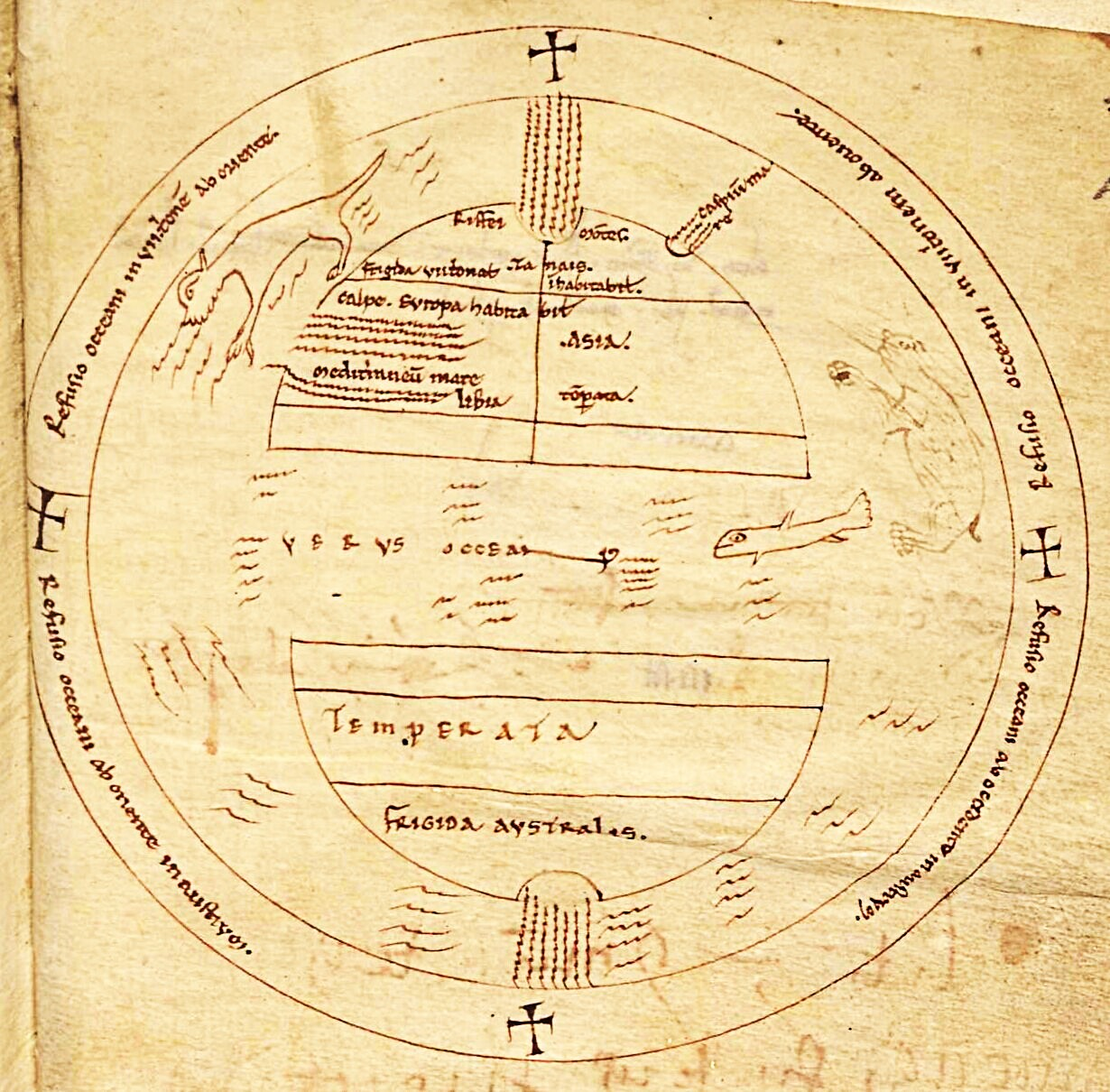
Earth map with hemispheres and imaginary middle ocean, same.

== Bibliography ==
- Cicero (1928). Keyes, Clinton W. (ed.). Cicero, On the Republic. On the Laws. Cambridge, MA: Harvard University Press. doi:10.4159/DLCL.marcus_tullius_cicero-de_re_publica.1928.
- Cicero (1995). Zetzel, James E.G. (ed.). Cicero: De Re Publica. Cambridge, UK: Cambridge University Press. ISBN 9780521348966.
- Drabble, Margaret; Stringer, Jenny; Hahn, Daniel, eds. (2007). "Somnium Scipionis". The Concise Oxford Companion to English Literature (3 ed.). Oxford University Press – via Oxford Reference.
- Macrobius (1952). Commentary on the Dream of Scipio. William Harris Stahl, ed. New York City, NY: Columbia University Press. OCLC 459820135.
- Palley, Julian (1979). "Bécquer's 'Disembodied Soul'". Hispanic Review. 47 (2): 185–192. doi:10.2307/472462.
- Reid, Patrick V. (1987). Readings in Western Religious Thought: The Ancient World. New York City, NY: Paulist Press. ISBN 9780809135332.
- Stahl, William Harris (1952). "Introduction". Commentary on the Dream of Scipio. New York City, NY: Columbia University Press. pp. 1–66. OCLC 459820135.
- Zetzel, James E.G. (1995). "Introduction". Cicero: De Re Publica. Cambridge, UK: 1995. pp. 1–36. ISBN 9780521348966.
