= The Dream of Scipio (novel) =

2002 novel by Iain Pears

- First edition (UK)
- Author: Iain Pears
- Language: English
- Genre: Historical, Mystery
- Publisher: Jonathan Cape (UK); Riverhead Books (US); Knopf (Canada)
- Publication date: 2002
- Publication place: United Kingdom
- Media type: Print (Hardcover & Paperback)
- Pages: 416 pp
- ISBN: 1-57322-986-5
- OCLC: 52363188

The Dream of Scipio is a novel by Iain Pears. It is set in Provence at three different critical moments of Western civilization—the collapse of the Roman Empire in the fifth century, the Black Death in the fourteenth, the Second World War in the twentieth—through which the fortunes of three men are followed:

- Manlius Hippomanes, a Roman Gallic aristocrat obsessed with the preservation of Roman civilization
- Olivier de Noyen, a poet and scholar, active in the Papal Court at Avignon
- Julien Barneuve, an intellectual who cooperates with the Vichy government

The story of each man is woven through the narrative, all linked by the Dream of Scipio, written by Manlius (not Cicero's eponymous classical text) and rediscovered by Olivier and Julien. Inspired by the teachings of Sophia, a Neoplatonist philosopher and the daughter of a student of Hypatia, Manlius composes the text to justify the decisions he takes when facing attack by the Visigoths and Burgundians, with little support from Rome. Religious issues, and how politics have influenced religious tolerance, shape all three stories: the roots of twentieth-century antisemitism are traced and linked to other political decisions to use Jews as scapegoats. The three stories are united by an extended deliberation on how one resolves ethical conflicts, emotional commitments, and the quest for the true meaning of human life.

The story is narrated by an omniscient narrator, who tells the reader many things which the characters have no way of knowing such as how Olivier de Noyen, diligently searching for ancient manuscripts, narrowly missed finding the only copy of the correspondence between Manlius and Sophia, which could have become a classic comparable to the letters of Abelard and Héloïse, and how this manuscript was irrevocably lost in a fire fifty years later; or how after Julien Barneuve's death, the photo of his Jewish beloved was carelessly thrown away while the woman herself was sent by the Nazis to Auschwitz.

== Possible relations to historical figures ==
Manlius's text appears similar to one by Macrobius, a fifth-century Neoplatonist philosopher. For example, the tenth chapter of Macrobius's commentary on Cicero's Dream of Scipio discusses how humans are dead when living, and vice versa, and how the soul ascends after its death on this Earth.

The story of Sophia, and the nonromantic part of her relationship with Manlius, bears a striking resemblance to the life of Hypatia, a Neoplatonist philosopher who was murdered by a Christian mob. Like Sophia, Hypatia also maintained a correspondence with a Christian bishop named Synesius of Cyrene, and although she was not a Christian, Hypatia was well respected for her intellect and poise by both Christians and non-Christians.

The name "Olivier de Noyen" might be a nod to Chrétien de Troyes. Although Chrétien lived two centuries before Olivier and in another region of France, he is described as having "the peculiar fortune of becoming the best known of the old French poets to students of medieval literature, and of remaining practically unknown to any one else."

Marcel Laplace shares a similarity with Maurice Papon in being one of the few civil servants to continue working as such after a successful stint in the Vichy government.

Gersonides (Rabbi Levi ben Gershon), the Jewish philosopher who acts as Olivier de Noyen's mentor, is an actual historical figure, well known as both a Jewish religious scholar and as a scientist (the Lunar Rabbi Levi crater is named for him). However, his encounter with Pope Clement VI (also a historical figure) during the Black Death, depicted in the book, is entirely fictional. In fact, it is disputed among historians whether Gersonides was still alive at that time. Gersonides' servant Rebecca, Olivier's beloved, is also completely fictional.
