= Stone's Fall =

2009 historical-mystery novel by Iain Pears

- First edition cover
- Author: Iain Pears
- Language: English
- Genre: Historical-Mystery
- Publisher: Spiegel & Grau
- Publication date: 2009
- Publication place: United Kingdom
- Media type: Print (Hardcover)
- Pages: 608
- ISBN: 978-0-385-52284-7
- OCLC: 251203669

Stone's Fall is a 2009 historical-mystery novel by Iain Pears.

== Synopsis ==
An ageing BBC reporter approaching retirement in 1953, Matthew Braddock is on a farewell tour, visiting the old Paris bureau. Chancing upon a familiar name in the obituary notices, he decides to attend the funeral of an acquaintance he has not seen for many years. After the service, he is approached by a stranger who introduces himself as the deceased woman's solicitor. He surprises Braddock with the information that the firm has been holding a package for many years, addressed to him, with instructions to deliver it only after this woman's death. Later, on his trip back to London, Braddock reminisces about those days of his youth in 1909, when he met the beautiful and mysterious Elizabeth. Equally mysterious was the death (and life) of her husband, Baron Ravenscliff, born John William Stone. Later, Braddock opens the long-delayed package to find a pair of extraordinary manuscripts. These two documents, written accounts of events occurring in 1890 and 1867 respectively, follow Braddock's recollections to form the three-part structure of the historical-mystery novel Stone's Fall.

== Critical reception ==
The novel received mixed reviews:

The Washington Post wrote " A marvel of skillful agglomeration, the novel propels us backward in time to illuminate one man's rise and fall. " and "Pears is an exuberant writer who cannot resist a digression whether describing an incidental character or the invention of the torpedo. But his narrative chatter -- charming or trying, depending on your mood -- somewhat diminishes the major characters, whose individual voices are often lost in the general din."

Entertainment Weekly wrote "This is a massive and well-made book, one ultimately better at characterizing money matters than human affairs"

NPR said "Stone's Fall is one of those gloriously long books that is never long enough."

Kirkus Reviews said "A learned, witty and splendidly entertaining descent into the demimondes of international espionage, arms dealing, financial hanky-panky and other favorite pastimes of those without conscience." and "Classy crime fiction, delightfully written, with few straight lines in sight."

The Los Angeles Times said the novel was "daunting only in its length; though bogged down in parts, it is wonderfully accessible and entertaining" that "The ending is well worth the long wait." and that the book "is an entertainment in the best sense: thrilling, compelling, ambitious and smart. It demands slow reading (and even rereading) as the many pieces of this intricate puzzle masterfully come together."

The Guardian criticized the reverse chronology saying "The structure is an audacious one and not without its pitfalls. Stone's Fall is constructed as an intricate and, at almost 600 pages, hefty, puzzle, but because the end of the story is known from the outset, its revelations must be cleverly managed if the plot is to retain sufficient tension. [...] Though [] ignorance might be necessary to ensure that secrets are not uncovered with too great a haste, there is nothing more irksome than a detective stupider than the reader" and also criticized the twist ending "It is regrettable, then, that the urge to contrive a final twist to the tale proves too great for Pears to resist. This sprawling, unconventional, occasionally dazzling novel ends with an unconvincing and unnecessary denouement which serves only to undermine the foundations of the elaborate edifice he has worked so painstakingly to create."

The New York Times wrote "Alas, the plot is now a monster and cannot be resolved without the supernatural, sexual deviancy, the precision engineering of high explosives, narcotics and incest. I have nothing against those amenities in literature, but if you use them you have to use them with conviction, not as the bent nails, stripped screws and dried-up wood glue in the bottom layer of the literary toolbox."

The Daily Telegraph said "Fans of Pears’s humdinger of a historical thriller An Instance of the Fingerpost (1997) will not be surprised to learn this is also a juicy mystery with lashings of period detail and recondite information: by the end of the book most readers will know enough about the construction of torpedoes, for example, to have a go at making their own." and "Sadly, the final section, set in Venice in 1867 and narrated by Stone, doesn’t quite fulfil expectations. Pears, having virtually mythologised Stone, does not manage to create a narrative voice for him that suggests an individual of particular ability or insight. Still, there are plenty of other fine characterisations. Pears has the good journalist’s knack of making high finance enthralling – he can take Robert Peston’s job any day – but it is his interest in the peculiar effects that money has on human beings that makes him a good novelist."

== Awards and nominations ==
- Shortlisted for the 2010 Walter Scott Prize for historical fiction.
