= Statue of Queen Victoria, Bengaluru =

Public sculpture by Thomas Brock

Statue of Queen Victoria
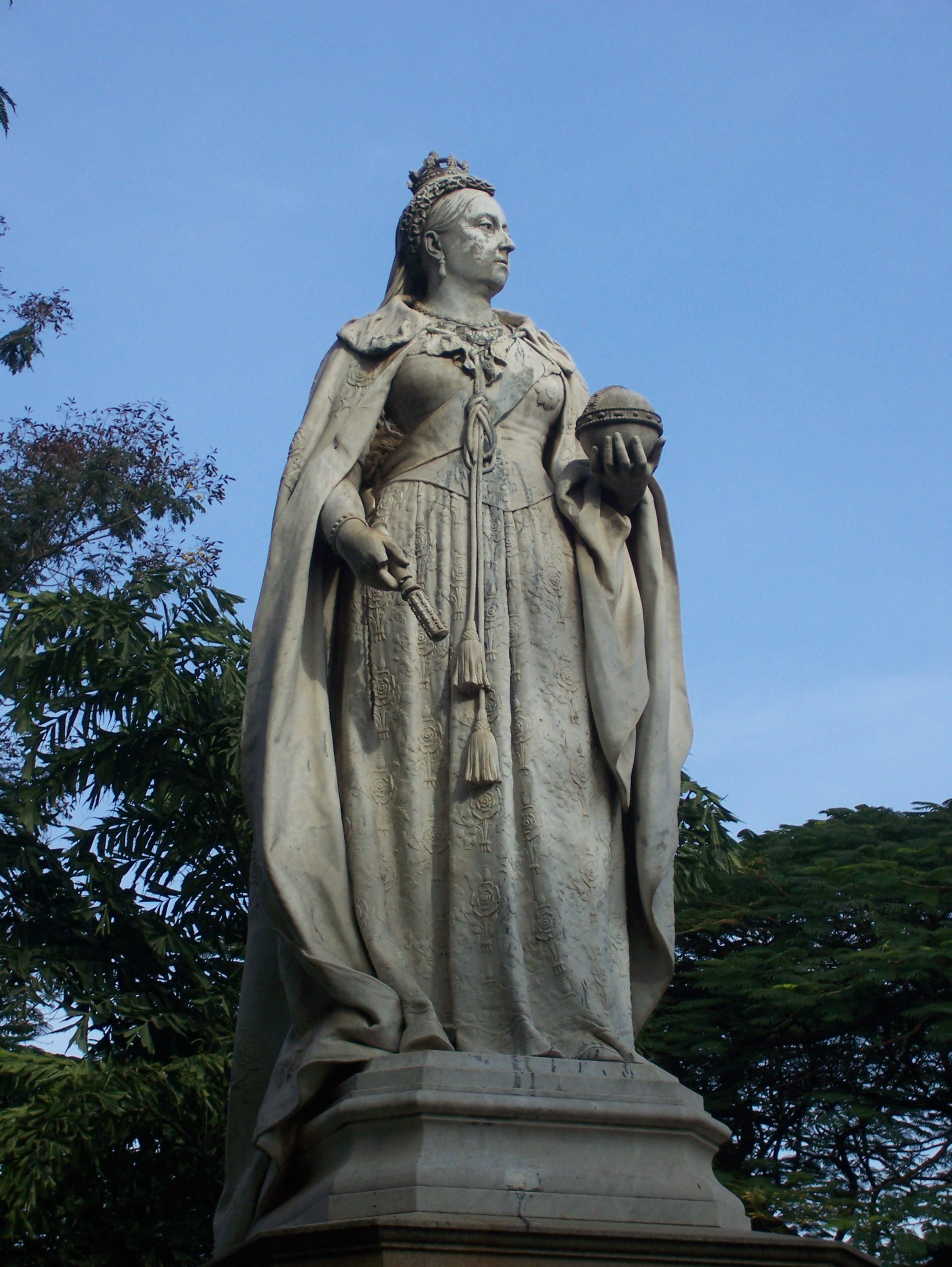
- Statue of Queen Victoria, Bangalore

- Statue of Queen Victoria, Bangalore
- 12°58′36.60744″N 77°35′55.68612″E
- Location: Queen's Park, Bangalore Cantonment, India

History
- Dedicated: 5 February 1906

Site notes
- Sculptor: Thomas Brock

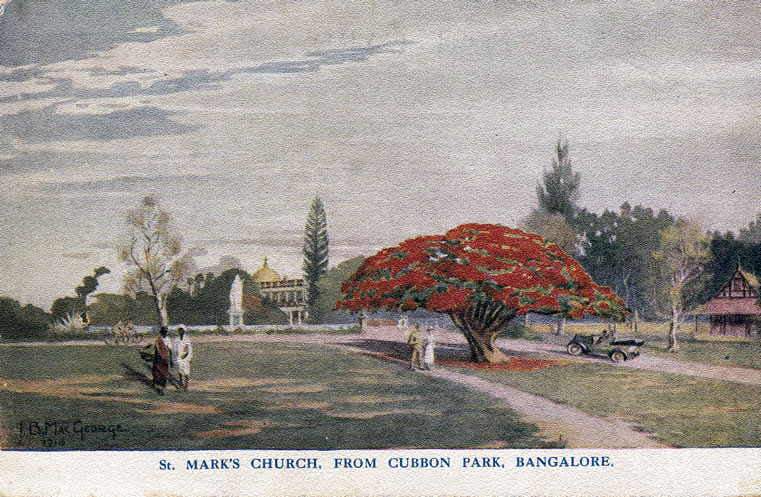
Statue of Queen Victoria, seen near the St. Mark's Cathedral, Bangalore

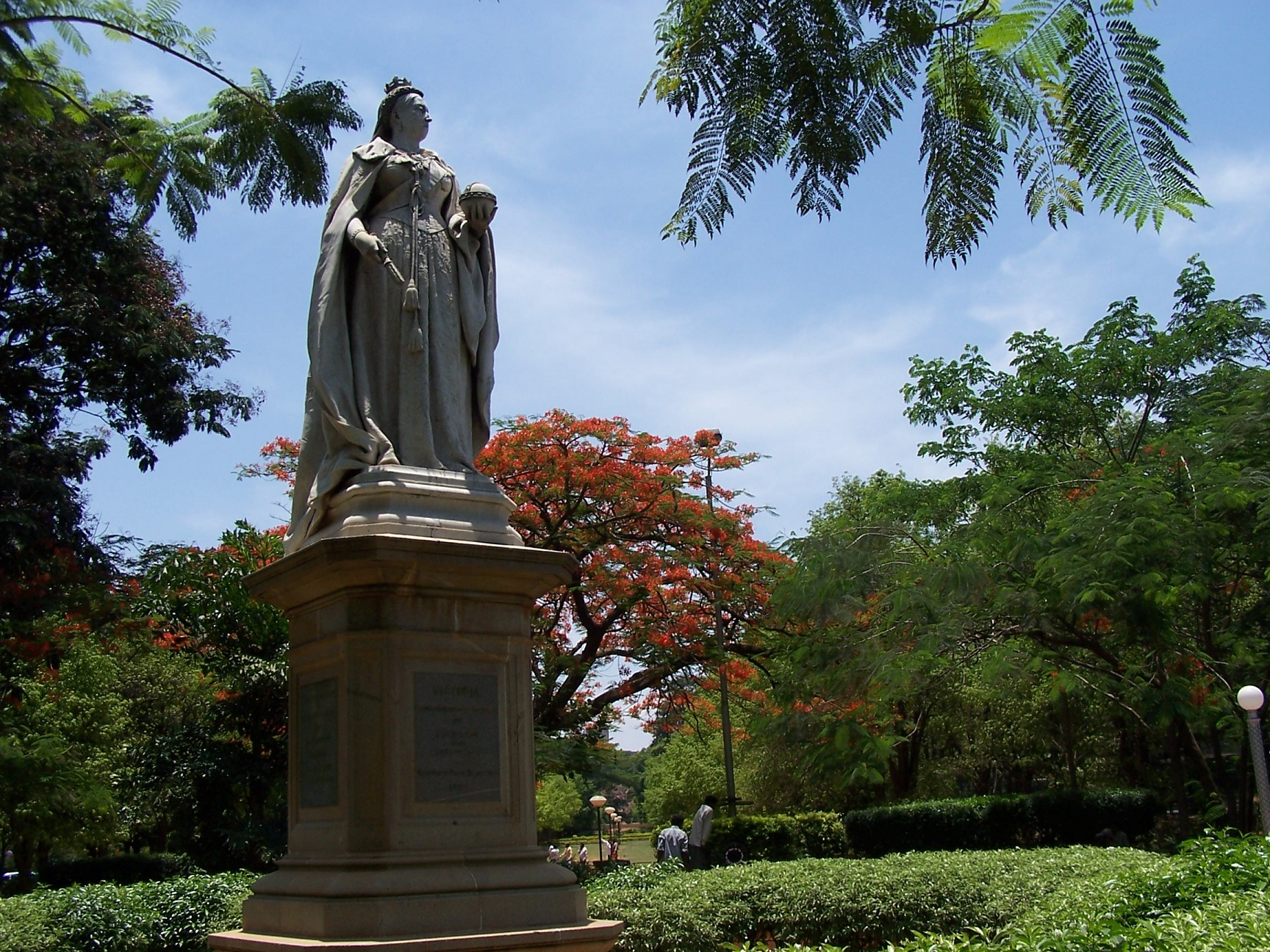
Victoria Statue, Bangalore

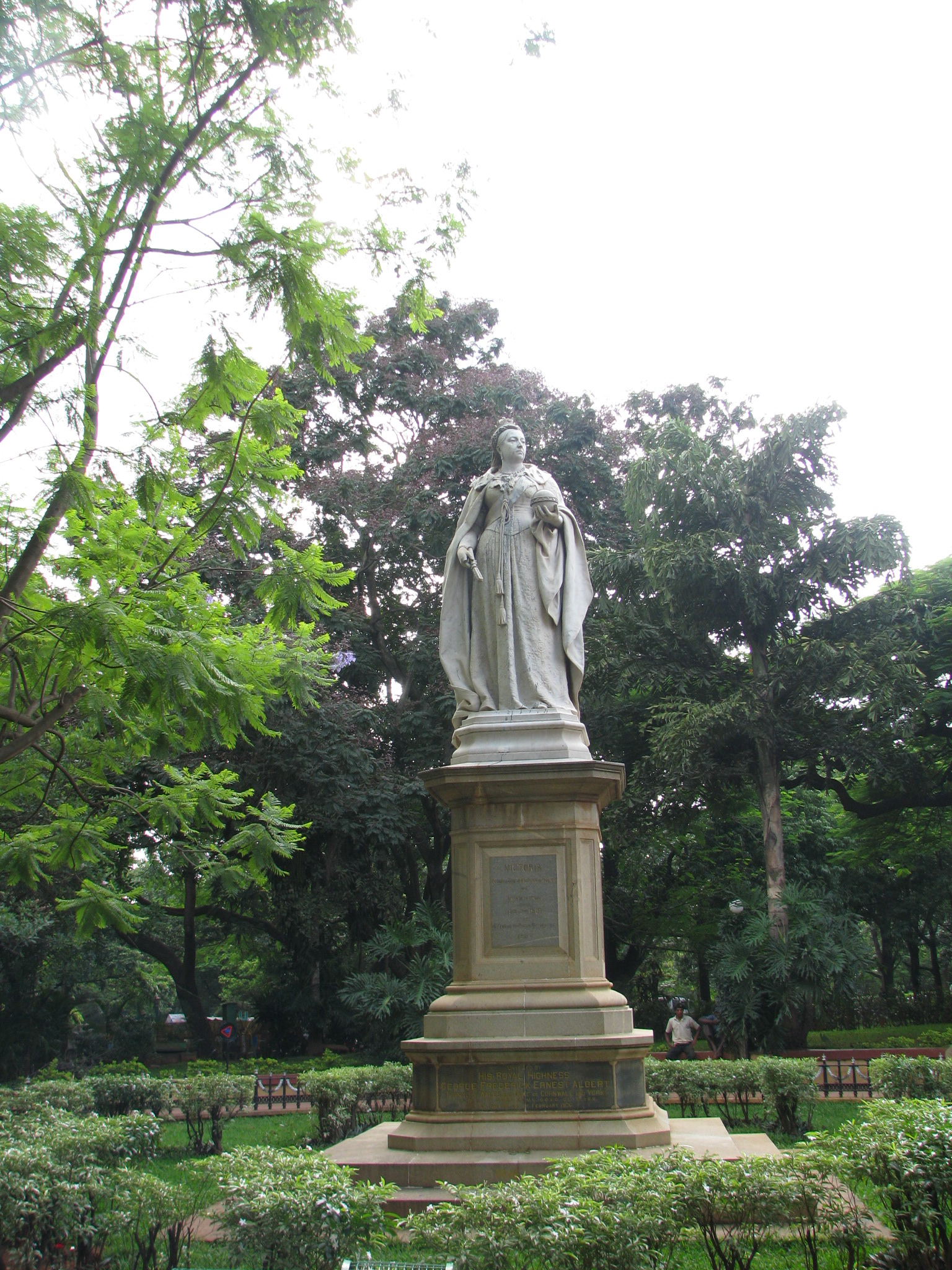
Statue of Queen Victoria, Bangalore

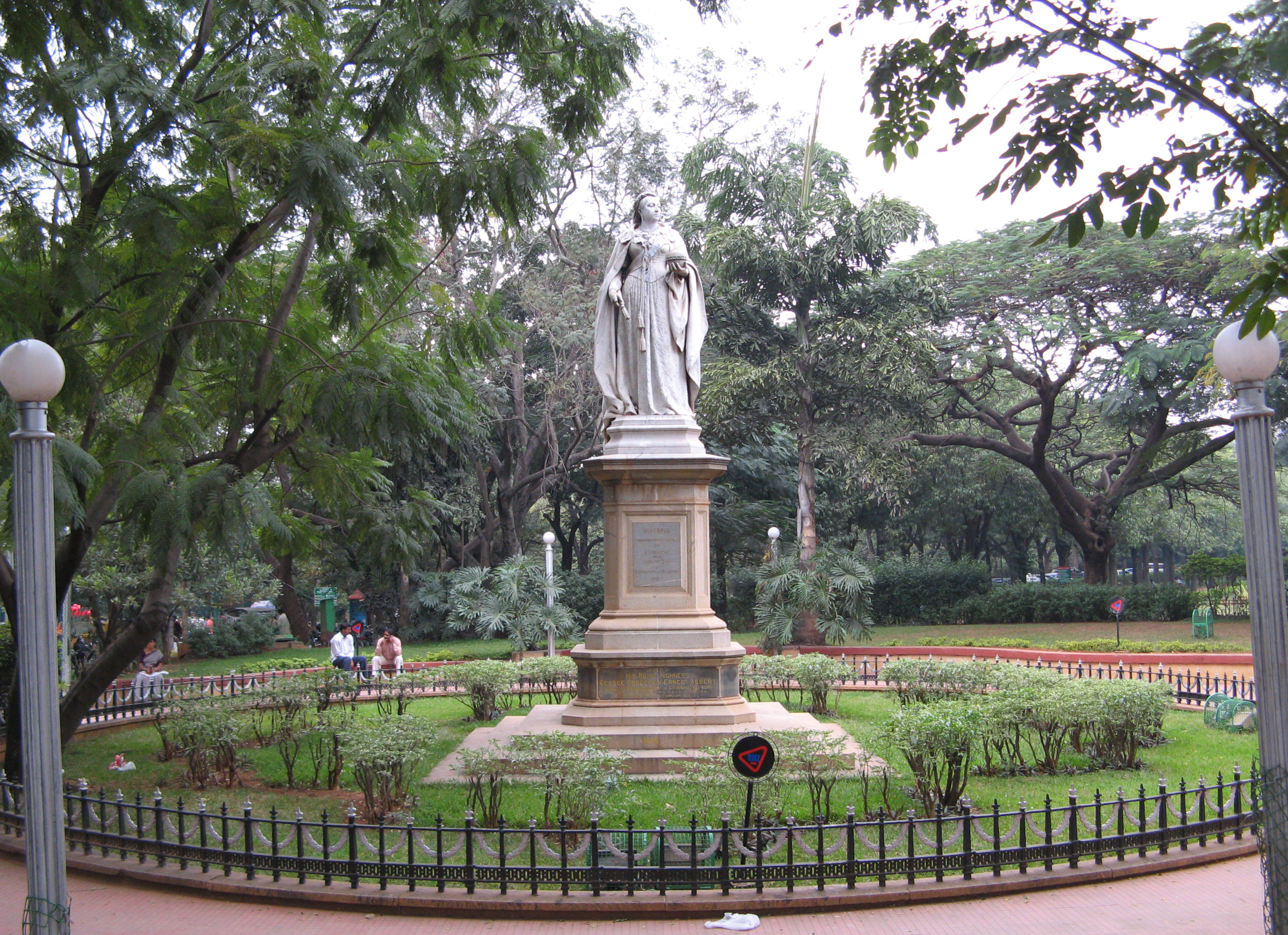
Full View of Victoria Statue

The Statue of Queen Victoria, Bangalore, is located at Queen's Park, next to Cubbon Park, Bangalore Cantonment, at the junction of 3 roads, at the border between the Cantonment and the Bangalore Pete. The statue was unveiled on 5 February 1906 by the then Prince of Wales, George Frederick Ernest Albert (who later became King George V). The statue was raised out of funds raised by the residents of the Bangalore Civil and Military Station and contributions made by Krishna Raja Wadiyar IV, the Maharaja of Mysore. This Statue of Queen Victoria is one of the five of the original 50 statues of Queen Victoria which were installed in British India, to still stand at its original location. The statue has blossoms of jacaranda falling around. On the other end of Queen's Park is the Statue of King Edward VII.

== Victoria, Empress of India ==
In 1858, after the dissolution of the East India Company, following the Sepoy Mutiny of 1857, India came under the control of the British Crown. In 1877, the British Prime Minister Benjamin Disraeli proclaimed Queen Victoria as the Empress of India. The Royal Titles Bill was brought before the British Parliament in 1876, and faced opposition from the Liberals who felt that the title was synonymous with absolutism. The royal title change was announced by Queen Victoria, when she opened the British Parliament in person the first time since the death of her husband Prince Albert. The announcement to this effect was made in India at the Delhi Durbar on 1 January 1877, by the Viceroy of India, Lord Lytton.

== Victoria Statue ==
After the death of Queen Victoria in January 1901, committees were set up all over India, like other British Dominions, to raise statues of the Queen. In India, 50 such statues were raised of Queen Victoria. A Queen Victoria Memorial Fund was set up in the Bangalore Cantonment for raising a statue in Bangalore. A sum of BINR 10000 was raised in 6 months by the Fund. The then Maharaja of Mysore, Krishnaraja Wodeyar IV, agreed to meet rest of the funds required for the memorial. That amount was BINR 15,500.

Sir Thomas Brock, a celebrated sculptor, was commissioned to make the statue for Bangalore. Brock's famous work is the Victoria Memorial, London outside the gates of the Buckingham Palace. Thomas Brock sculpture of Queen Victoria is 11 ft height, and is made from marble. The pedestal, made of granite is 13 ft. in height. The cost of the statue and the pedestal came up to BINR 25,500. The statue was shipped from England and arrived in Bangalore in July 1905. The statue of Victoria at Bangalore is a copy of the one made by Brock in 1890 for his hometown Worcester, England. The statue is also similar to other Victoria statues standing in London, Hove, Carlisle, Belfast, Brisbane and Cape Town. Other than Bangalore, Brock also sculpted the Queen Victoria statues raised in Agra, Cawnpore and Lucknow.

== The Statue at Bangalore ==
Unveiling ceremony

The Statue of Queen Victoria in Bangalore shows the Queen the Order of the Garter robes, which are decorated with tassels and roses. The Queen is carrying a scepter and an orb with a cross.

Out of the more than fifty statues of Queen Victoria, which were raised in British India, only five remain in their original locations. The statue at Bangalore being one of them. The others still at their original locations are Madras University Chennai, King Edward VII Market Vizagapatam and 2 statues at the Victoria Memorial, Calcutta

== Inauguration ==
The then Prince of Wales, George Frederick Ernest Albert (who later became King George V), unveiled the Statue of Queen Victoria, Bangalore Civil and Military Station, on 5 February 1906. In his speech, the Prince of Wales thanked the people of the Bangalore Civil and Military Station (who were British subjects), the Maharaja of Mysore and his native subjects, for helping raise the memorial statue (p. 75).

The Prince of Wales during his travel in British India, and before Bangalore, already unveiled statues of the late Queen at Calcutta, Rangoon and also the Victoria Technical Institute at Madras. From Bangalore, the Prince of Wales traveled on to Karachi, where he unveiled yet another statue of the late Empress of India.

== Inscriptions ==
Inscription on the statue reads

VICTORIA
QUEEN OF GREAT BRITAIN AND IRELAND
AND
EMPRESS OF INDIA
1837–1901
ERECTED BY PUBLIC SUBSCRIPTION
1906

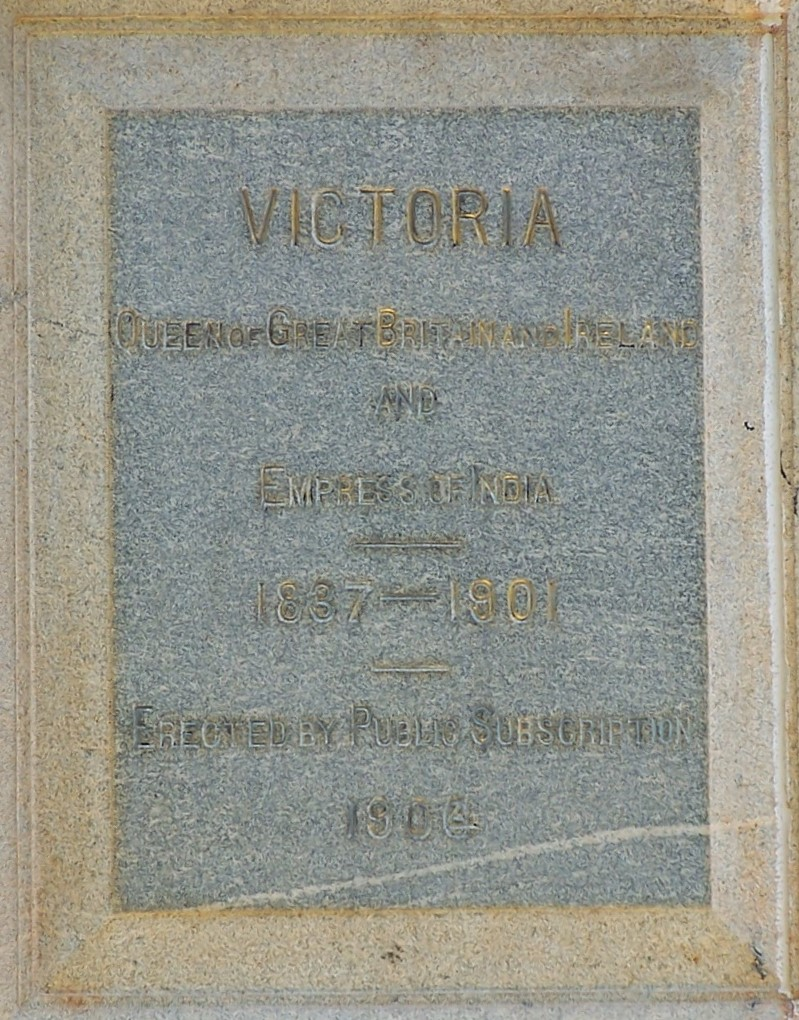
Victoria English Inscription (Front)

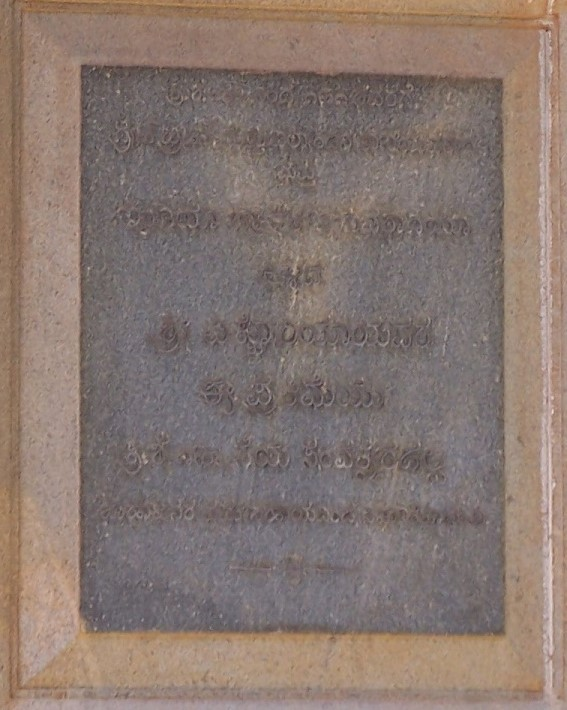
Victoria Kannada Inscription (Left)

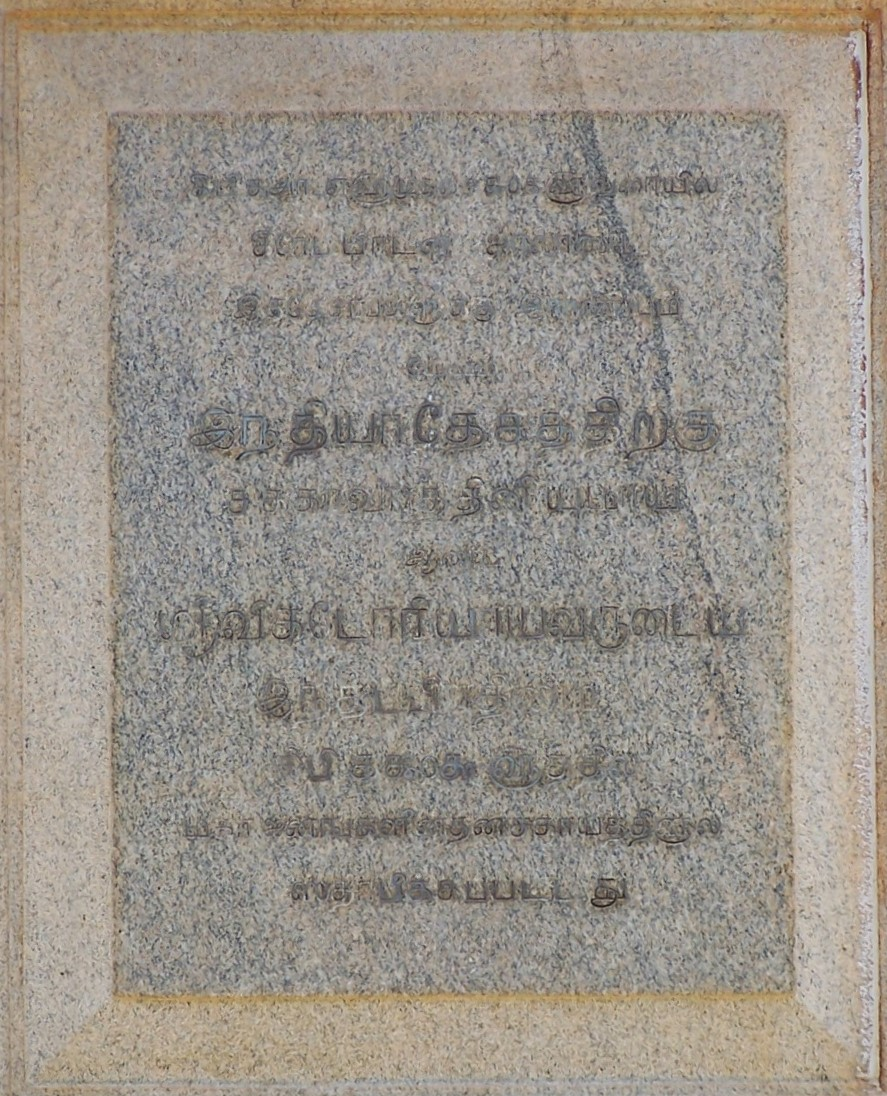
Victoria Tamil Inscription (Right)

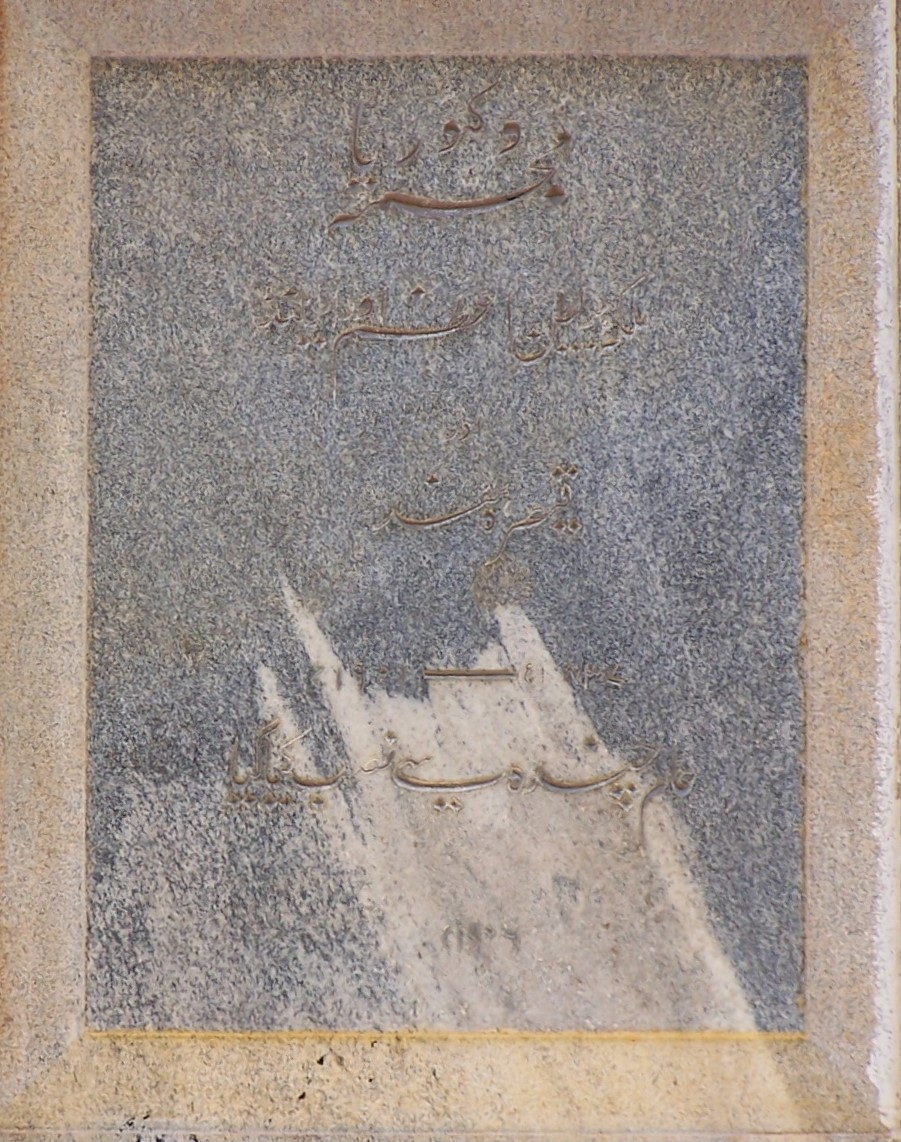
Victoria Urdu Inscription (Back)

Further, on the foot of the pedestal, another inscription says

UNVEILED BY
HIS ROYAL HIGHNESS
GEORGE FREDERICK ERNEST ALBERT
PRINCE OF WALES AND DUKE OF CORNWALL AND YORK
K.G., K.T., K.P., G.C.S.I., G.C.M.G., G.C.V.O., G.C.I.E., I.S.O.
ON THE 5TH DAY OF FEBRUARY, 1906

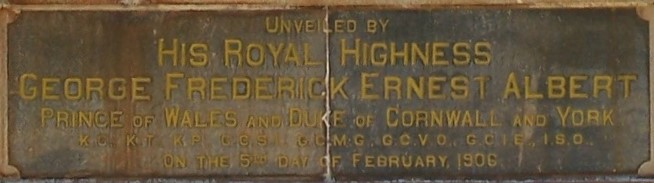
Victoria English Inscription (Front)

There are inscriptions in Kannada on the left, Tamil on the right and Urdu on the back, both on the pedestal and the foot of the pedestal, which are translations of the English Inscriptions.

== Present Status ==
Older photos of the statue show the statue being encircled with ornamental chains, and two cannons on either side with a sepoy guarding the statue.

At present, the regalia of the queen appears battered with age, the cross of the orb is missing, the scepter is broken and one of the fingers in the right hand of the queen is broken. The statue is still maintained regularly, but is almost obscured by lush green trees.

The Horticulture Department, Government of Karnataka have asked for expert reports for restoration of the Queen Victoria's Statue, along with the Statue of King Edward VII and statue of Chamaraja Wodeyar IV. Further it suggested polishing the statue of Victoria, and pruning of surrounding trees to make the statue more visible.

Since the 1960s, a group of political activists led by Vatal Nagaraj, (who is infamous for vandalising the cenotaph pillar which was raised in memory of the lives lost in the Siege of Bangalore, 1791, opposite to the present Corporation Building, and Hudson Memorial Church), has been demanding that statue of Queen Victoria, along with that of King Edward VII and Mark Cubbon be removed. The Government had at one stage accepted these demands and agreed to remove the statues in 1977, but never implemented the decision. Further, historians, and heritage lovers of Banaglore City are enraged with these suggestions of destruction of history and have raised their opposition. In 2013, members of the Cubbon Park Walkers’ Association garlanded the statue of Mark Cubbon in open defiance of these demands.

== Airbrushed Image ==
According to Miles Taylor, an associate professor of History in the University of London, the statue of Victoria had been 'air-brushed'. Queen Victoria, who was considered to be 'fat and ugly' had been morphed into a 'beauty'. Even though Queen Victoria never visited India, she was a much revered figure. The Government of British India had deliberately presented a youthful and beautiful image of Victoria amongst her Indian subjects, in order to make her popular. Further poets from the Madras Presidency and the Kingdom of Mysore wrote verses describing her beauty, as a result of the youthful image being presented.

The diamond jubilee of the reign of Queen Victoria was celebrated in Bangalore four months ahead of England. The Wodeyars had issued commemorative flags, as they were grateful that the Kingdom of Mysore was restored to the Wodeyars by Queen Victoria by appointing the mother of Krishnaraja Wadiyar III as the regent of Mysore.

Studying the Royal records reveal that Queen Victoria was very concerned about the condition of women and had directed the setting up of a hospital for women, and was keen for reforms in favor of widows in India. The Victoria Hospital in Bangalore Pete is also named after Queen Victoria.

== St. Andrew's Church ==
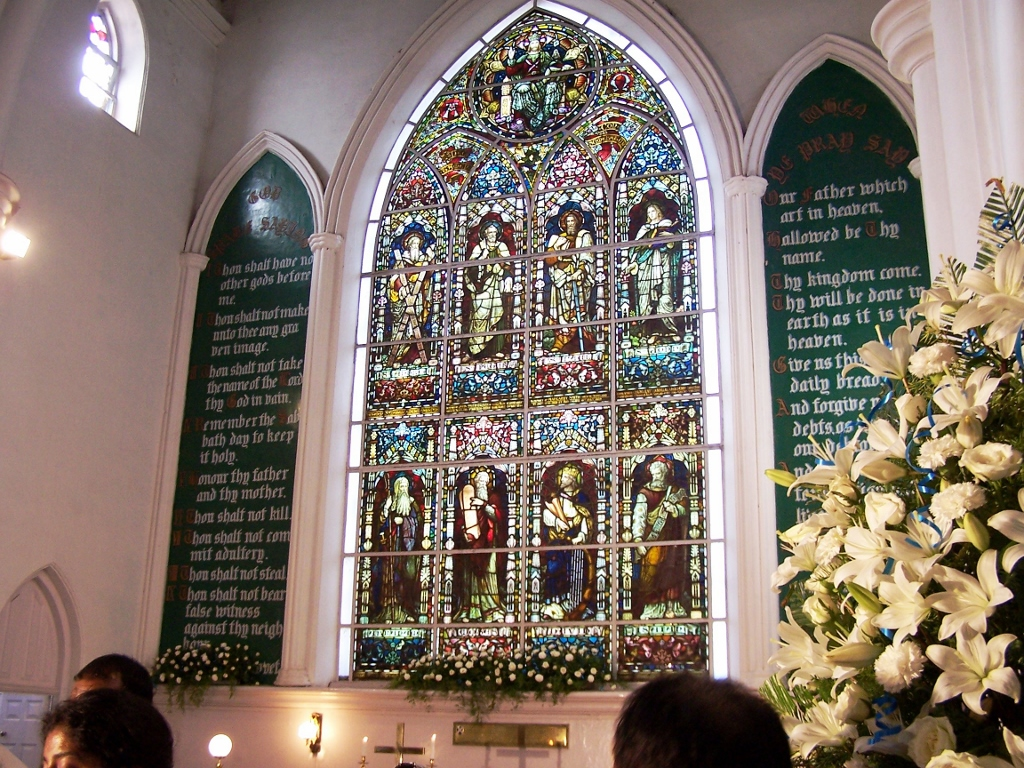
Stained Glass, St. Andrew's Church, Bangalore

At the St. Andrew's Church, Bangalore, there is a 25 ft. stained glass above the altar, fusing 15 panels into one, created by Scottish artist Alex Ballantine and his assistant Gardiner, in order to commemorate the diamond jubilee of the reign of Queen Victoria in 1897. At the base, the Old Testament characters of Abraham, Moses, King David and Prophet Isaiah are painted. The top the apostles of Christ – St. Andrew, St Peter, St Paul and St John are painted. Above this, there is the burning bush which is the symbol of the Church of kirk, alpha symbol on the right and omega symbol on the right (signifying beginning and the end). On the very top is painted Jesus Christ.

== Victoria Hospital, Bangalore ==
The foundation stone of Victoria Hospital in Bangalore Pete was laid on 22 June 1897 by Her Highness Kempananjammaniyavaru, the then Maharani Regent and dowager Maharani of Mysore, in commemoration of the completion of 60 years of Queen Victoria's reign. The Victoria Hospital was then formally inaugurated by Lord Curzon the then Viceroy of British India on 8 December 1900.

== See also ==
- Statue of King Edward VII, Bangalore
- List of statues of Queen Victoria
- Victoria Memorial (India)
- Cubbon Park
