= Commentarii in Somnium Scipionis =

Philosophical treatise of Macrobius

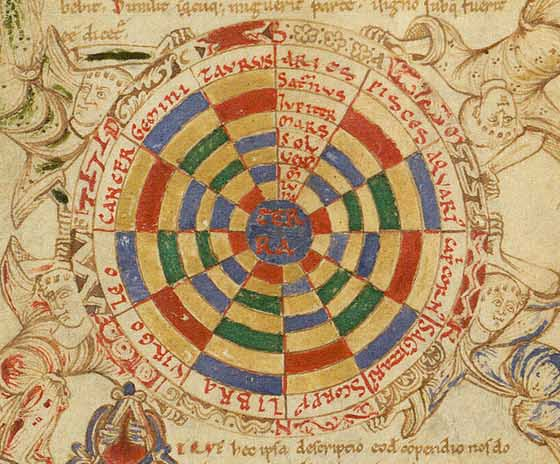
The Universe with the earth in the centre according to Macrobius (Diagram in folio 25 recto).

Commentary on Cicero's Dream of Scipio (Latin: Commentarii in Somnium Scipionis) is a philosophical treatise of Macrobius based on the famous dream narrated in On the republic of Cicero (Chapter VI, 9-29).

In Cicero's work, Scipio Africanus appears to his adoptive grandson, Scipio Aemilianus, and reveals him his future destiny, and that of his country, explains the rewards that await the virtuous man in another life, describes the universe and the place of the Earth and of man inside the universe.

Macrobius does not offer an exhaustive comment of the text of Cicero, but expounds a series of theories on the dreams from neoplatonic background, on the mystic properties of the numbers, on the nature of the soul, on astronomy and on music. He quotes a number of authorities, but is unlikely to have read them all, or even the majority. Plotinus and Porphyry are his main sources, and he quotes frequently from Virgil with ornamental purpose. Nevertheless, the work incorporates ideas of neoplatonism that have not been preserved in a direct form elsewhere. The style is quite uneven, since Macrobius copies or translates his sources without unifying the style.

== See also ==
- De re publica
- Macrobius
- Cicero
- Neoplatonism
- Plotinus
- Porphyry

== Bibliography ==
- Macrobio (2006). Comentario al Sueño de Escipión de Cicerón. Madrid: Gredos. ISBN 978-84-249-2851-3.
- Macrobio (2005). Comentarios al Sueño de Escipión (Jordi Raventós ed.). Madrid: Siruela. ISBN 978-84-7844-926-2.
- Cicerón (1984). Sobre la República. Madrid: Gredos. ISBN 978-84-249-0964-2.
