= An Instance of the Fingerpost =

1997 novel by Iain Pears

- First edition
- Author: Iain Pears
- Language: English
- Genre: Historical, Mystery
- Publisher: Jonathan Cape
- Publication date: September 1997
- Publication place: United Kingdom
- Media type: Print (hardback & paperback)
- Pages: 692 pp
- ISBN: 0-224-04466-4
- OCLC: 37781458

An Instance of the Fingerpost is a 1997 historical mystery novel by Iain Pears.

The main setting is Oxford in 1663, with the events initially revolving around the mysterious death of an academic. The novel depicts fictionalized versions of several historical figures of the Stuart Restoration, including philosophers, scientists, spymasters, inventors, clerics, politicians, and conspirators. Also covered is the then-ongoing Cretan War (1645-1669). The events are written from the perspective of older versions of some of the characters, who are writing their memoirs in 1685.

A subplot depicts a religious cult which believes that Jesus keeps being reborn and keeps getting martyred throughout history. The 17th-century reincarnation of Jesus depicted in the novel is female.

== Synopsis ==
A murder in 17th-century Oxford is related from the contradictory points of view of four of the characters, all of them unreliable narrators. The setting of the novel is 1663, just after the restoration of the monarchy following the English Civil War, when the authority of King Charles II is not yet settled, and conspiracies abound.

Most of the characters are historical figures. Two of the narrators are the mathematician John Wallis and the historian Anthony Wood. Other characters include the philosopher John Locke, the scientists Robert Boyle and Richard Lower, spymaster John Thurloe, inventor Samuel Morland and the Anglican cleric Thomas Ken, who was later Bishop of Bath and Wells. The plot is at first centred on the death of Robert Grove but later takes in the conspiracies of John Mordaunt and William Compton (of Compton Wynyates), and the politics of Henry Bennet and Lord Clarendon. Furthermore, the characters that are fictional are nonetheless drawn from real events. The story of Sarah Blundy incorporates that of Anne Greene, while Jack Prestcott is involved in events based on the life of Richard Willis (of the Sealed Knot).

The accounts are written in the form of memoirs by each narrator many years after the events they describe, after Thomas Ken gained his Bishopric but before the death of Henry Bennet. This dates them to 1685, the last year of Charles' reign.

A contrast portrayed in the novel is, on one hand, a philosophy based on ancient and medieval learning, and, on the other, the scientific method that was beginning to be applied in physics, chemistry and medicine.

There is also a fantasy element in novel, with reference to a heretical sect believing that Jesus Christ is in every generation reborn and undergoes martyrdom again, with the suggestion that one of the book's female characters was the 17th century incarnation of Jesus.

== Title ==
The four parts of the novel are preceded by Epigraphs taken from Francis Bacon's Novum Organum. The first three quotations describe three of Bacon's four Idols of the mind. The fourth quotation is the source of the title. The quotation is much abbreviated, with no ellipses showing the omissions. The full text (using a slightly different translation of the book) is as follows:

Among Prerogative Instances I will put in the fourteenth place Instances of the Fingerpost, borrowing the term from the fingerposts which are set up where roads part, to indicate the several directions. These I also call Decisive and Judicial, and in some cases, Oracular and Commanding Instances. I explain them thus. When in the investigation of any nature the understanding is so balanced as to be uncertain to which of two or more natures the cause of the nature in question should be assigned on account of the frequent and ordinary concurrence of many natures, instances of the fingerpost show the union of one of the natures with the nature in question to be sure and indissoluble, of the other to be varied and separable; and thus the question is decided, and the former nature is admitted as the cause, while the latter is dismissed and rejected. Such instances afford very great light and are of high authority, the course of interpretation sometimes ending in them and being completed. Sometimes these instances of the fingerpost meet us accidentally among those already noticed, but for the most part they are new, and are expressly and designedly sought for and applied, and discovered only by earnest and active diligence.

The term "fingerpost" is also an obscure synonym for prelate or priest, foreshadowing one of the book's main plot points.

In the original Latin, the term "fingerpost" is simply "cross" (crucis), echoing the decisive "crucifixion" revealed in the story:

Inter praerogativas instantiarum, ponemus loco decimo quarto Instantias Crucis; translato vocabulo a Crucibus, quae erectae in biviis indicant et signant viarum separationes. ...

Francis Bacon, Novum Organum, Book Two, "Aphorisms", Section XXXVI.

== Reception ==
A New York Times book review gave the novel a favourable review, praising its intricate plot and comparing it positively to Umberto Eco's The Name of the Rose.

A positive review in The Independent described it as a "deeply scholarly thriller", with a narrative that covers themes relating to the nature of truth and knowledge.

== See also ==
- The Siege of Candia
- An Experiment on a Bird in the Air Pump
- Also compare: Ann Lee
- Rashomon effect
