= Leonard Jennings (sculptor) =

English sculptor

Leonard Jennings OBE
- Born: 1887; Acton, London, England
- Died: 5 October 1956 (aged 68–69); Ipswich, Suffolk, England
- Known for: Sculpture

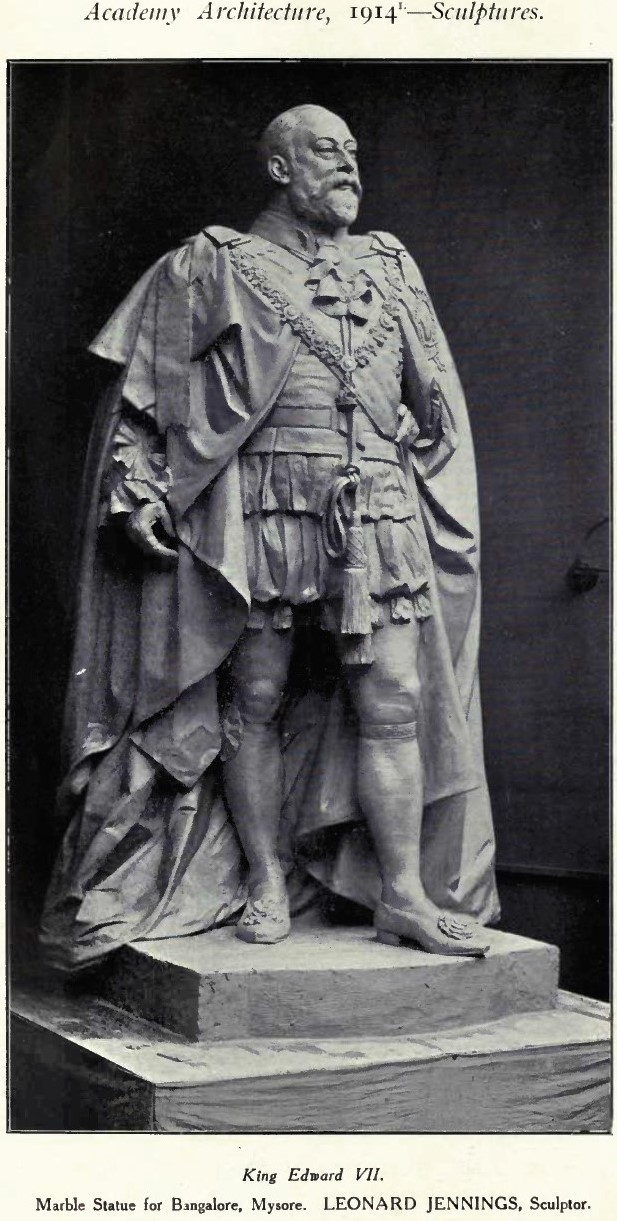
Leonard Jenning's statue of Edward VII in Bengaluru.

Leonard Jennings (1887 – 5 October 1956) was an English sculptor and British Army officer.

== Early life ==
Jennings was born in Acton, London in 1887. His artistic training involved study at the Lambeth School of Art, Glasgow School of Art and the Royal Academy Schools. He first worked as an assistant to Francis Derwent Wood before moving to India to work for the Indian Government. There he produced a number of statues of the royal family and taught at the Calcutta Art School.

== Career ==
=== Military career ===
Jennings first enlisted in the Surrey Yeomanry following the outbreak of the First World War. He was commissioned into the Northumberland Hussars in 1915, serving in the staff of Lord Rawlinson. He was awarded an OBE in the 1919 Birthday Honours. After the war, Jennings was placed on the reserve list with the rank of Captain and rejoined the army at the outbreak of the Second World War serving on staff appointment in the UK.

=== Sculpture ===
Jennings's work as a sculptor saw him producing his most significant works prior to the outbreak of the First World War. He produced statues and monuments such as the statue of Edward VII in Bangalore. Other works included portrait sculptures and equestrian statuettes.

Jennings was a member of the Society of British Sculptors. He would exhibit between 1904 and 1939 including at the Royal Academy.
