= Statue of Edward VII, Bengaluru =

Statue of Edward VII
- Statue of King Edward VII in Bangalore
- 12°58′49.07568″N 77°35′41.76024″E
- Location: Queen's Park, Bangalore Cantonment, India

History
- Dedicated: 28 November 1919

Site notes
- Sculptor: Leonard Jennings

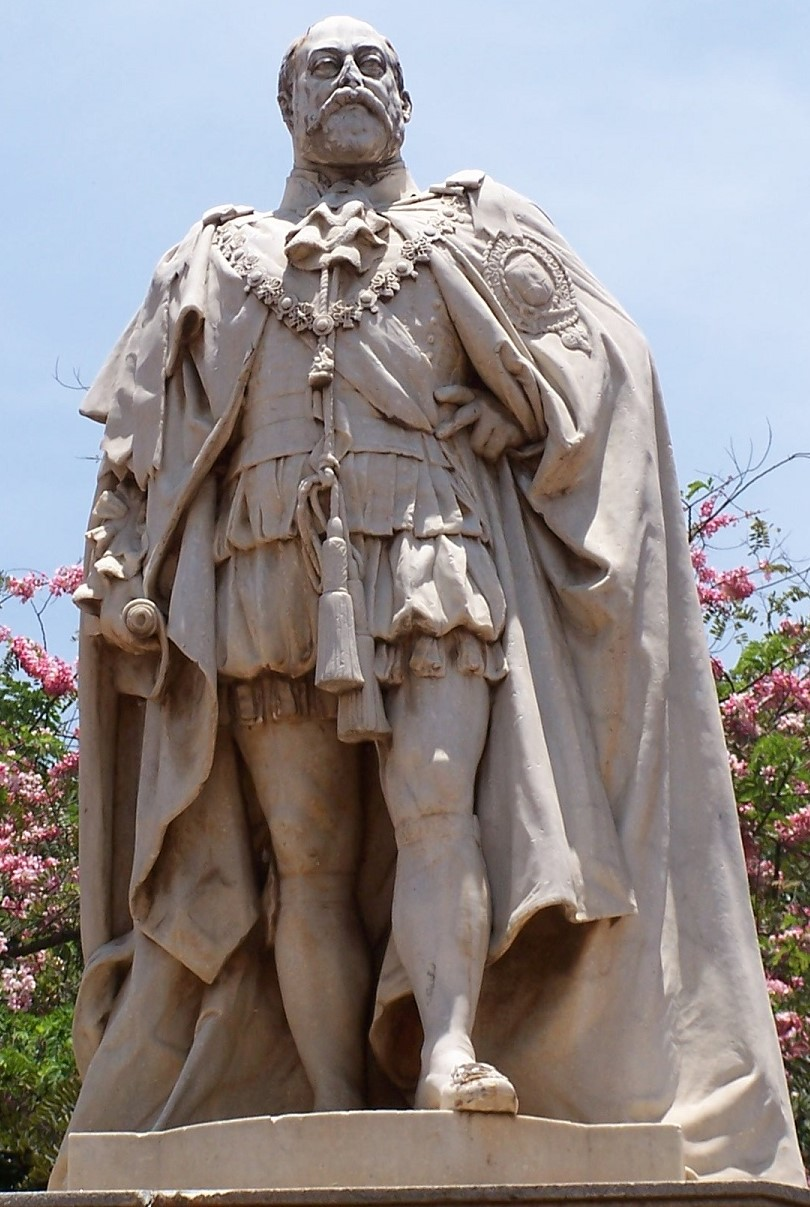
Edward VII Front, Bangalore

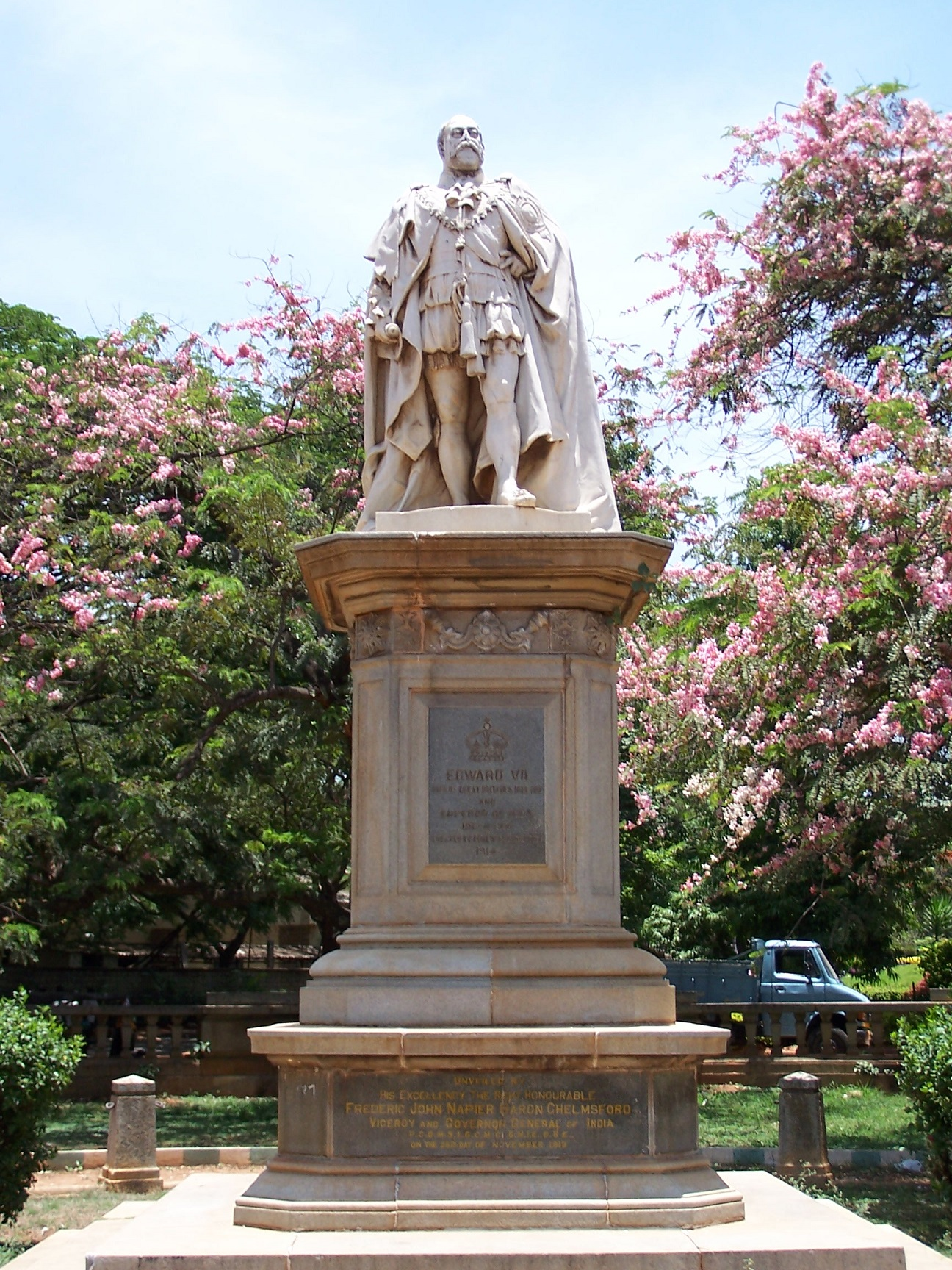
Edward VII Front Full, Bangalore

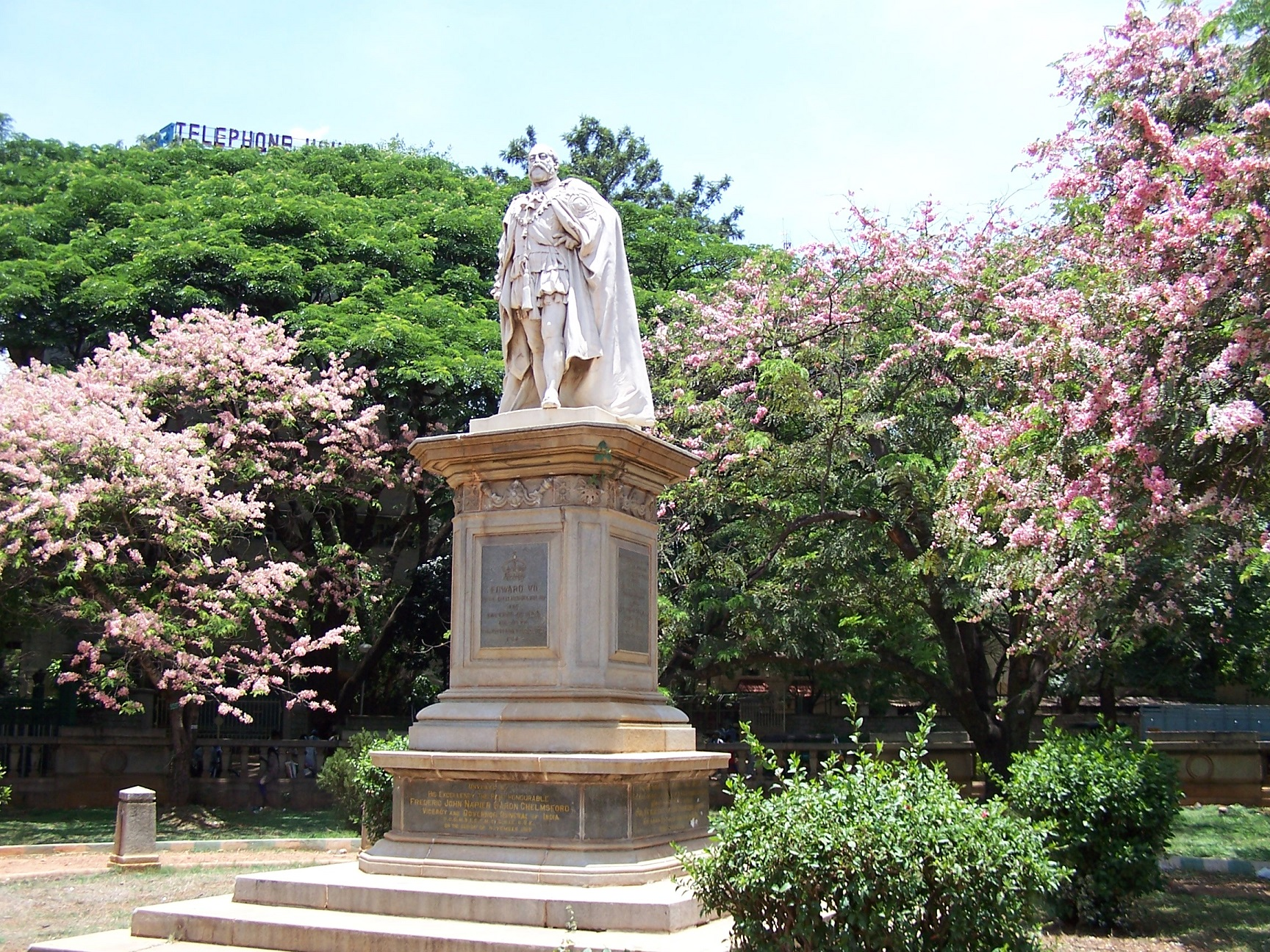
Edward VII Statue, Bangalore

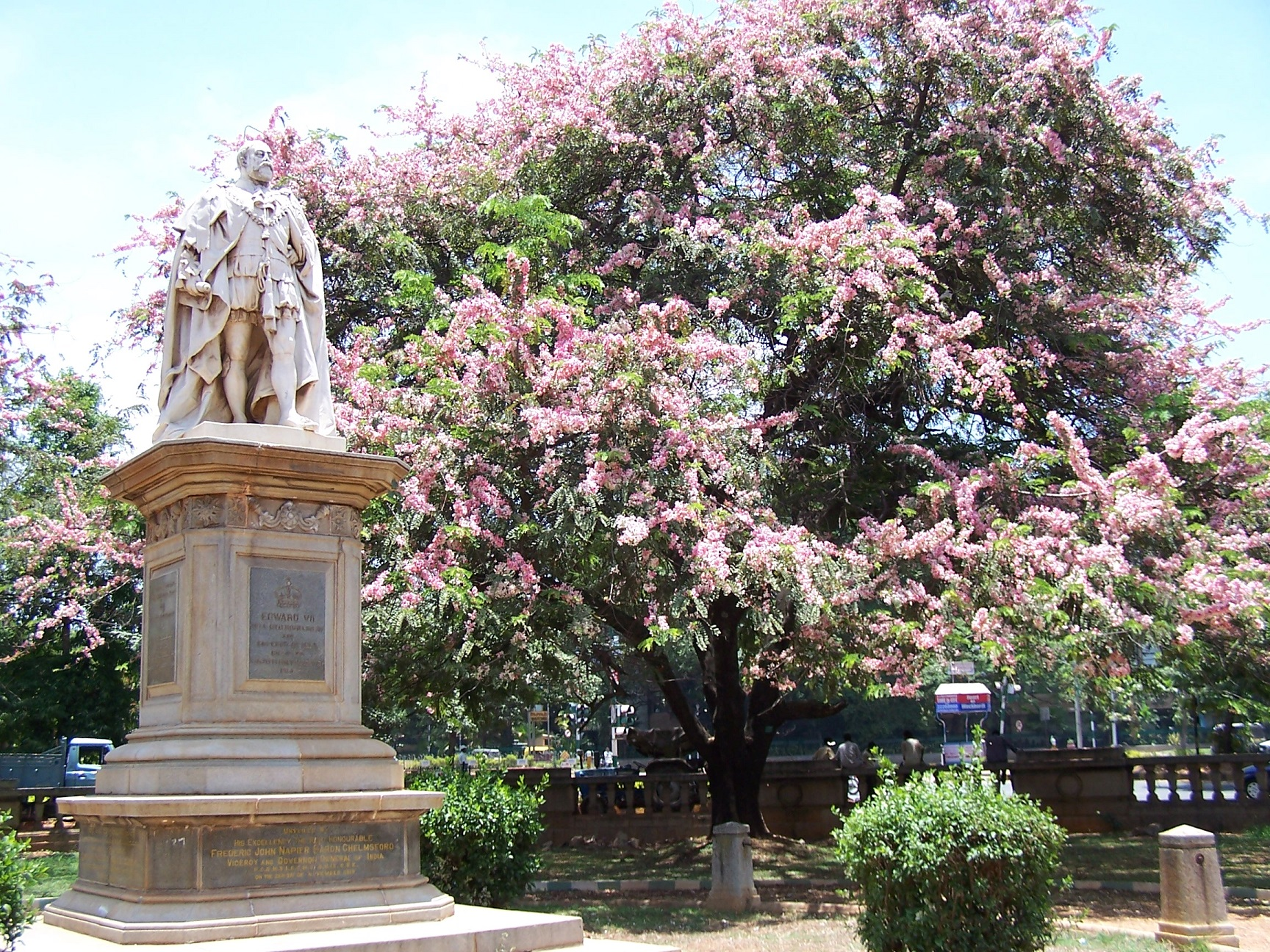
Edward VII Canopy, Bangalore

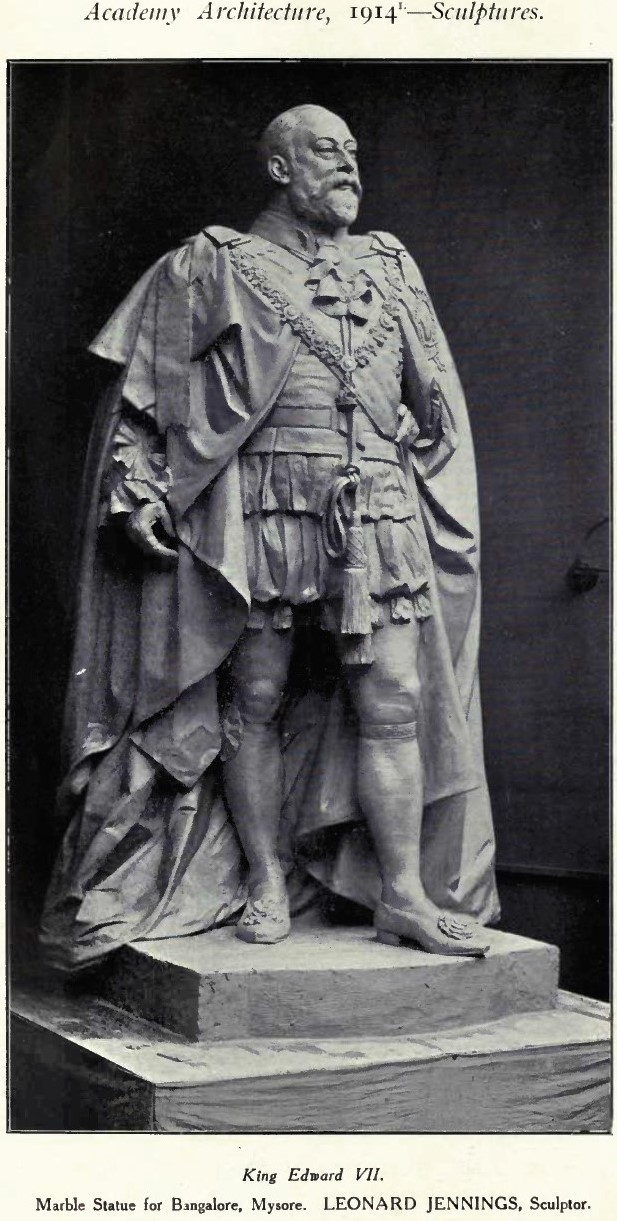
Studio photo of the Marble Statue of King Edward VII for Bangalore, Mysore. By Leonard Jennings, Sculptor(1914)

The statue of Edward VII in Bangalore is located at Queen's Park, next to Cubbon Park, Bangalore Cantonment, at the junction of Queen's Road and Cubbon Road. The statue was unveiled in November 1919 by the then Viceroy and Governor-General of India, Frederic John Napier, Baron Chelmsford. The statue was raised out of funds raised by the residents of the Bangalore Civil and Military Station. The Statue of King Edward VII is one of the few of the original statues which were installed in British India, to still stand at its original location. The statue rises above a flowering frangipani tree. On the other end of Queen's Park is the Statue of Queen Victoria, Bangalore. The statue was designed and sculpted by Leonard Jennings of Chelsea, London.

== Edward VII, Emperor of India ==
Edward VII reigned as the King of the United Kingdom and the British Dominions and Emperor of India between 1901 and 1910, following his mother Queen Victoria's death in 1901. In 1875 he had toured British India as subcontinent as the Prince of Wales, but never visited again as Emperor of India. His short reign ended with his death in 1910, and the throne was passed on to his son, George V.

== Leonard Jennings ==
Leonard Jennings (1877–1956), OBE, designed and sculpted the Statue of King Edward VII at Bangalore. Jennings was born in Acton, London, and studied art at the Lambeth School of Art, Glasgow School of Art and the Royal Academy of Arts. Jennings worked for the Government of India and also taught at the Calcutta School of Art. Most of Jennings's public commissions were in India. These include the statue of King Edward VII at Bangalore, Thackeray Memorial at Calcutta, the Imperial Service Cavalry Brigade Memorial at Teen Murti Bhavan New Delhi, statue of the Prince of Wales (later the Duke of Windsor) commissioned by the Aga Khan at Bombay, marble bust of Nawab Abdul Latif, C.I.E (1913–14) at Calcutta University Senate House, and a 10 ft statue of George V in coronation robes at Patna.

== Inscriptions ==
Inscription on the statue reads

EDWARD VII
KING OF GREAT BRITAIN AND IRELAND
AND
EMPEROR OF INDIA
1901–1910
ERECTED BY PUBLIC SUBSCRIPTION
1914

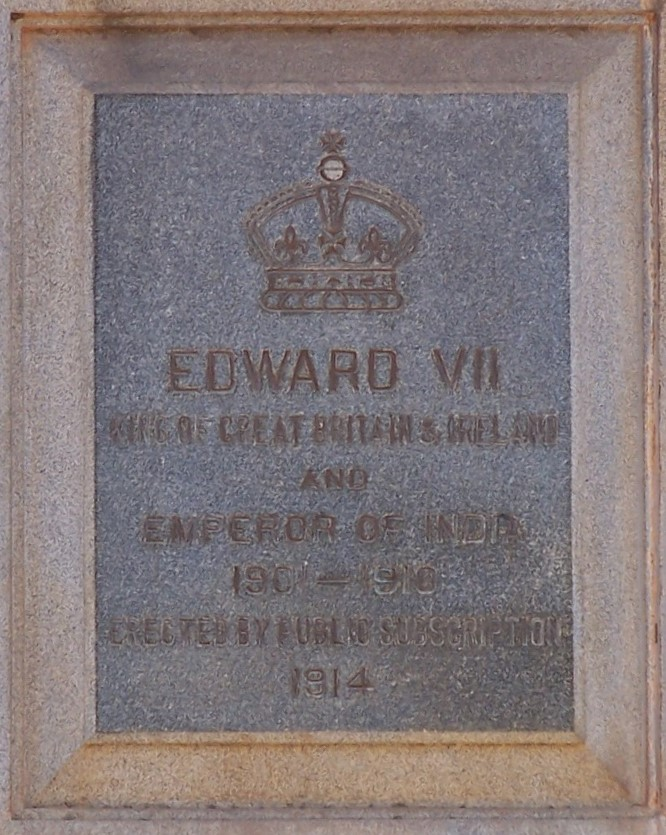
Edward VII English Inscription (Front)

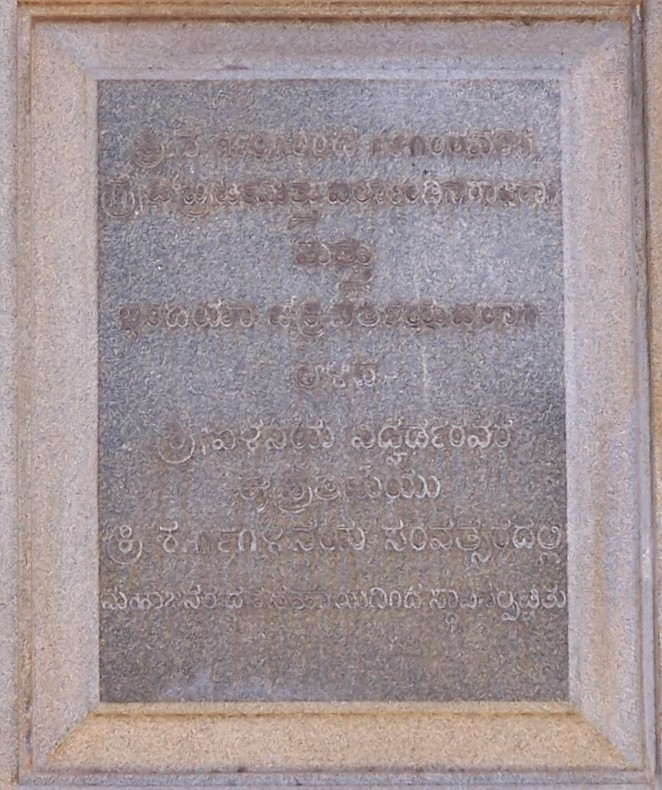
Edward VII Kannada Inscription (Left)

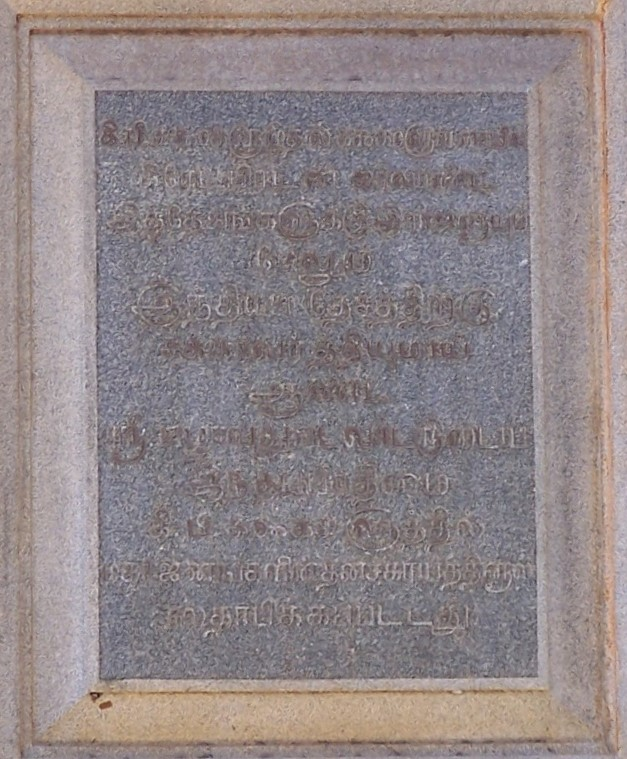
Edward VII Tamil Inscription (Right)

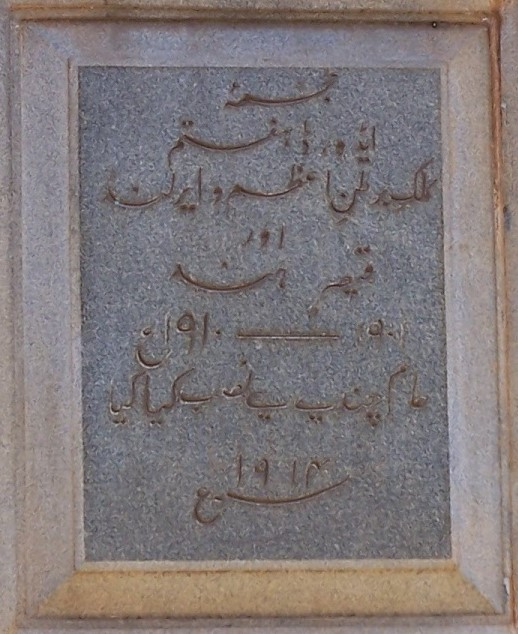
Edward VII Urdu Inscription (Back)

Further, on the foot of the pedestal, another inscription says

UNVEILED BY
HIS EXCELLENCY THE RIGHT HONOURABLE
FREDERICK JOHN NAPIER BARON CHELMSFORD
VICEROY AND GOVERNOR GENERAL OF INDIA
P.C.G.M.S.I., G.C.M.G., G.M.I.E., O.B.E.
ON THE 28TH DAY OF NOVEMBER 1919

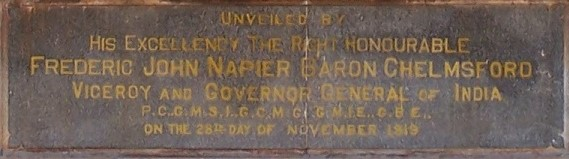
Edward VII English Inscription (Front)

There are inscriptions in Kannada on the left, Tamil on the right and Urdu on the back, both on the pedestal and the foot of the pedestal, which are translations of the English Inscriptions.

== Present Status ==
The Statue of King Edward VII lies largely ignored and neglected as a result of the Bangalore Metro, and lies covered by layers of dirt and dust.

The Horticulture Department, Government of Karnataka have asked for expert reports for restoration of the King Edward VII's Statue, along with the Statue of Queen Victoria and statue of Chamaraja Wodeyar IV. Further it suggested polishing the statue of Edward VII, and pruning of surrounding trees to make the statue more visible.

Since the 1960s, a group of political activists led by Vatal Nagaraj, (who is infamous for vandalising the cenotaph pillar which was raised in memory of the lives lost in the Siege of Bangalore, 1791, opposite to the present Corporation Building, and Hudson Memorial Church), has been demanding that the statue of Edward VII, along with that of Queen Victoria and Mark Cubbon be removed. The Government had at one stage accepted these demands and agreed to remove the statues in 1977, but never implemented the decision. Further, historians, and heritage lovers of Banaglore City are enraged with these suggestions of destruction of history and have raised their opposition. Recently members of the Cubbon Park Walkers’ Association garlanded the statue of Mark Cubbon in open defiance of these demands.

== See also ==
- Statue of Queen Victoria, Bangalore
- Cubbon Park
