= Clime =

Divisions of the inhabited portion of the Earth by geographic latitude

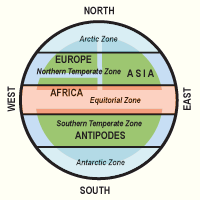
Diagram showing climatic zone corresponding with those suggested by Aristotle.

The climes (singular clime; also clima, plural climata, from Greek κλίμα klima, plural κλίματα klimata, meaning "inclination" or "slope") in classical Greco-Roman geography and astronomy were the divisions of the inhabited portion of the spherical Earth by geographic latitude.

Starting with Aristotle (Meteorology 2.5,362a32), the Earth was divided into five zones, assuming two frigid climes (the Arctic and Antarctic) around the poles, an uninhabitable torrid clime near the equator, and two temperate climes between the frigid and the torrid ones. Different lists of climata were in use in Hellenistic and Roman time. Claudius Ptolemy was the first ancient scientist known to have devised the so-called system of seven climes (Almagest 2.12) which, due to his authority, became one of the canonical elements of late antique, medieval European and Arab geography. In Medieval Europe, the climes for 15 and 18 hours of longest daylight at summer solstice were used to calculate the changing length of daylight through the year.

The modern concept of climate and the related term clime are derived from the historical concept of climata.

== Ptolemy ==
Ptolemy gives a list of parallels, starting with the equator, and proceeding north at intervals, chosen so that the longest day (summer solstice) increases in steps of a quarter of an hour from 12 hours at the equator to 18 hours at 58° N, and then, in larger steps, to 24 hours at the Arctic Circle.

But for the purposes of his geographical tables, Ptolemy reduces this list to eleven parallels, dividing the area between the equator and 54°1' N into ten segments, at half-hour intervals reaching from 12 hours to 17 hours. Even later in his work, he reduces this to seven parallels, reaching from 16°27' N (13 hours) to 48°32' N (16 hours).

Ptolemy's system of seven climes was primarily adopted in Arabo-Persian astronomy, by authors such as al-Biruni and al-Idrisi, and eventually by Amīn Rāzī, the author of the 16th-century haft iqlīm (lit. 'seven climes'), while in Europe, Aristotle's system of five climes was more successful. This view dominated in medieval Europe, and existence and inhabitability of the Southern temperate zone, the antipodes, was a matter of dispute.

=== Thirty-nine parallels ===
To identify the parallels delineating his climes, Ptolemy gives a geographical location through which they pass. The following is a list of the 33 parallels between the equator and the polar circle (39 parallels between the equator and the pole) of the full system of climes; the reduced system of seven climes is indicated by additional numbers in brackets. Both Ptolemy's latitude estimates and modern values are provided. Ptolemy never considered the impact of atmospheric refraction on his calculation of the length of the day. If you account for that and for the drift in orbital parameters since Ptolemy's time, his values are remarkably accurate, off by less than 30 arcseconds in most cases.

parallel	clima	Ptolemy's latitude	actual latitude	longest daylight	location
1.		0°	0°	12 hours	(equator)
2.		4°4' N	2°14' N	12:15	Taprobana (Sri Lanka)
3.		8°25' N	6°31' N	12:30	Avalites (Saylac, Somalia)
4.		12°00' N	10°42' N	12:45	bay of Adulis (Eritrea)
5.	I	16°27' N	14°46' N	13:00	Meroe island
6.		20°14' N	18°39' N	13:15	Napaton (Nubia)
7.	II	23°51' N	22°20' N	13:30	Syene (Aswan)
8.		27°12' N	25°48' N	13:45	Thebes
9.	III	30°22' N	29°3' N	14:00	Lower Egypt
10.		33°18' N	32°4' N	14:15	Phoenicia
11.	IV	36°00' N	34°53' N	14:30	Rhodes
12.		38°35' N	37°29' N	14:45	Smyrna
13.	V	40°56' N	39°53' N	15:00	Hellespont
14.		43°04' N	42°5' N	15:15	Massalia (Marseille)
15.	VI	45°01' N	44°7' N	15:30	the middle of the Euxine Sea
16.		46°51' N	45°59' N	15:45	Istros (Danube)
17.	VII	48°32' N	47°43' N	16:00	the mouths of Borysthenes (Dnieper)
18.		50°04' N	49°18' N	16:15	Maeotian Lake (Sea of Azov)
19.		51°06' N	50°45' N	16:30	the southern shore of Britannia
20.		52°50' N	52°6' N	16:45	mouths of the Rhine
21.		54°1' N	53°20' N	17:00	mouths of the Tanais river (Don)
22.		55° N	54°29' N	17:15	Brigantion in Britannia
23.		56° N	55°32' N	17:30	the middle of Great Britain
24.		57° N	56°30' N	17:45	Katouraktonion in Britannia
25.		58° N	57°24' N	18:00	the southern part of Britannia Minor
26.		59° N	59°0' N	18:30	the middle part of Britannia Minor
27.		61° N	60°21' N	19:00	the northern part of Britannia Minor
28.		62° N	61°30' N	19:30	Ebudes island
29.		63° N	62°29' N	20 hours	Thule
30.		64°30' N	63°59' N	21 hours	unknown Scythians
31.		65°30' N	64°59' N	22 hours	
32.		66° N	65°33' N	23 hours	
33.		66°8'40"N	65°44' N	24 hours	polar circle
		69°30' N	68°48' N	2 months	
		78°20' N	77°27' N	4 months	
39.		90° N	90° N	6 months	(North Pole)

== See also ==
- Climate
- Four continents
- Geographical zone
- Roof of the World
- Seven Seas

== Bibliography ==
- Berggren J.L., Jones A. (2000). Ptolemy's Geography: An Annotated Translation of the Theoretical Chapters. Princeton University Press. 216 p.
- Dicks D.R. (1955). "The ΚΛΙΜΑΤΑ in the Greek Geography". Classical Quarterly 5 (49): 248–255.
- Dicks D.R. (1956). "Strabo and the ΚΛΙΜΑΤΑ". Classical Quarterly 6 (50): 243–247.
- Dicks D.R. (1960) The Geographical Fragments of Hipparchus. London: Athlon Press. XI, 214 p.
- Diller A. (1934). "Geographical Latitudes in Eratosthenes, Hipparchus and Posidonius". Klio 27 (3): 258–269.
- Honigmann E. (1929). Die sieben Klimata und die πολεις επισημοι. Eine Untersuchung zur Geschichte der Geographie und Astrologie in Altertum und Mittelalter. Heidelberg: Carl Winter's Universitätsbuchhandlung. 247 S.
- The Itinerary of Alexander through the Seven Climes of Antiquity according to the Aljamiado-Morisco Rrekontamiento del rrey Alisandre. Santa Barbara, CA. Fifth Annual Middle East Studies Regional Conference. March 22, 2003.
- Kubitschek W. (1921). "Klima 2". Real-Encyclopädie der classischen Altertumswissenschaft. Ed. A. F. von Pauly, G. Wissowa et al. Stuttgart. Bd. XI.1: 838–844.
- Marcotte D. (1998). "La climatologie d'Ératosthène à Poséidonios: genèse d'une science humaine". G. Argoud, J.Y. Guillaumin (eds.). Sciences exactes et sciences appliquées à Alexandrie (IIIe siècle av J.C. – Ier ap J.C.). Saint Etienne: Publications de l'Université de Saint Etienne: 263–277.
- Neugebauer O. (1975). A History of Ancient Mathematical Astronomy. Berlin, Heidelberg, New York: Springer Verlag: 43–45, 333–336, 725–733.
- Shcheglov D.A. (2004/2006). "Ptolemy's System of Seven Climata and Eratosthenes' Geography". Geographia Antiqua 13: 21–37.
- Shcheglov D.A. (2006): "Eratosthenes' Parallel of Rhodes and the History of the System of Climata". Klio 88: 351–359.
- Szabó Á. (1992). Das geozentrische Weltbild. Astronomie, Geographie und Mathematik der Griechen. München: Dt. TaschenbuchVerlag. 377 S.
- Szabó Á., Maula E. (1986). Les débuts de l'astronomie de la géographie et de la trigonométrie chez les grecs. Traduit par M. Federspiel. Paris: Libr. philos. J. Vrin. 238 p.
