= Iain Pears =

English art historian, novelist and journalist

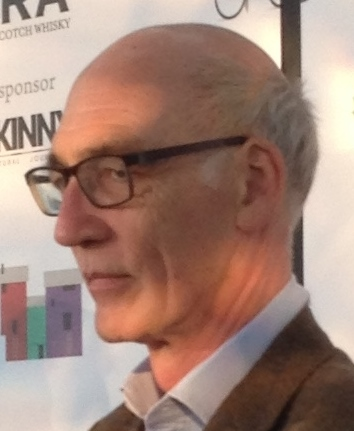
- Iain Pears at the 2015 Edinburgh International Book Festival
- Born: 8 August 1955 (age 71); Coventry, England
- Education: Wadham College, Oxford; Wolfson College, Oxford
- Occupations: Author; Art Historian; Journalist
- Spouse: Ruth Harris
- Children: 2

Iain George Pears (born 8 August 1955) is an English art historian, novelist and journalist.

== Personal life ==
Pears was born on 8 August 1955 in Coventry, England. He was educated at Warwick School, an all-boys public school in Warwick. He studied at Wadham College, Oxford, graduating with a Bachelor of Arts (BA) degree, and at Wolfson College, Oxford, graduating with a Doctor of Philosophy (DPhil) degree. Pupil of art-historian Francis Haskell.

In 1985, Pears married Ruth Harris, a historian and academic. Together they have two sons. He currently lives with his wife and children in Oxford.

== Career ==
Before writing, he worked as a reporter for the BBC, Channel 4 (UK) and ZDF (Germany) and correspondent for Reuters from 1982 to 1990 in Italy, France, UK and US. In 1987 he became a Getty Fellow in the Arts and Humanities at Yale University.

Pears first came to international prominence with his best-selling book An Instance of the Fingerpost (1997), which was translated into several languages. He is known for experimenting with different narrative structures, presenting four consecutive versions of the same events in An Instance of the Fingerpost, three stories interleaved in The Dream of Scipio (2002), three stories told in reverse chronological order in Stone's Fall (2009), and allowing the reader to switch between multiple narratives in the electronic book version of Arcadia (2015). He has also written a novel series featuring Jonathan Argyll, art historian.

== Bibliography ==
=== Jonathan Argyll series (art history mysteries) ===
This series presents detective art historian Jonathan Argyll who works with two members of the (fictitious) Italian Art Squad: Flavia di Stefano (deputy) and General Bottando (head of the squad). Pears published seven books in the series:

- The Raphael Affair (1991)
- The Titian Committee (1992)
- The Bernini Bust (1993)
- The Last Judgement (1994)
- Giotto's Hand (1995)
- Death and Restoration (1996)
- The Immaculate Deception (2000)

=== Novels ===
- An Instance of the Fingerpost (1997)
- The Dream of Scipio (2002)
- The Portrait (2005)
- Stone's Fall (2009)
- Arcadia (2015)

=== Other books ===
- The Discovery of Painting (1989)
- Parallel Lives: A Love Story From a Lost Continent (2024). Bio of his teacher art-historian Francis Haskell.
