= United Mission School =

Location
- Mission Road; Bangalore; India
- 12.964219°N 77.587395°E

Information
- Former name: Wesleyan Canarese School, London Mission Canarese School
- Type: Government aided, private school
- Established: 1834; 192 years ago
- Founder: Thomas Hodson of the Wesleyan Mission, and Benjamin Rice of the London Mission
- Campus size: 20 acres (81,000 m^{2})
- Affiliation: Karnataka State Secondary Education Examination Board
- Former Names: Wesleyan Canarese School, London Mission Canarese School
- Renamed after: Wesleyan Mission and London Mission
- Management: Church of South India
- Diocese: Karnataka Central Diocese
- Website: http://www.umdcblr.org/

The United Mission School is located on Mission Road, Bangalore and is managed by the Church of South India. The school offers English medium education and is affiliated to the Karnataka Secondary Education Examination Board. The school has classes from Year 1 to Year 10. In 1993, the United Mission Degree College was established on the same campus, offering Bachelor of Commerce and Bachelor of Business Management courses, affiliated to the Bangalore University.

== Wesleyan Mission Schools, Bangalore, 1832 ==
Captain Woodward of the 32 NI, reporting on 4 November 1832, for a gathering of respectable residents of the Bangalore Civil and Military Station speaks of the existing Wesleyan Mission Schools at the Cantonment. The Bungalow schools had around 131 children, with 36 children (12 girls and 24 boys) being schooled in the Wesleyan Mission premises. The emphasis was to acquire an education to increase their morals and also to create teachers for future schools.

The Wesleyan Mission at the Bangalore Cantonment was established in 1819, with the Tamil Services at the chapel (present Wesley Tamil Church, Haines Road), being well attended. Contact was mainly with the Tamil population, and for reaching to the Canarese, Thomas Hodson was being trained in that language. The chapel also conducted an English service for the benefit of the Wesleyan soldiers.

== Wesleyan Canarese School, 1834 ==
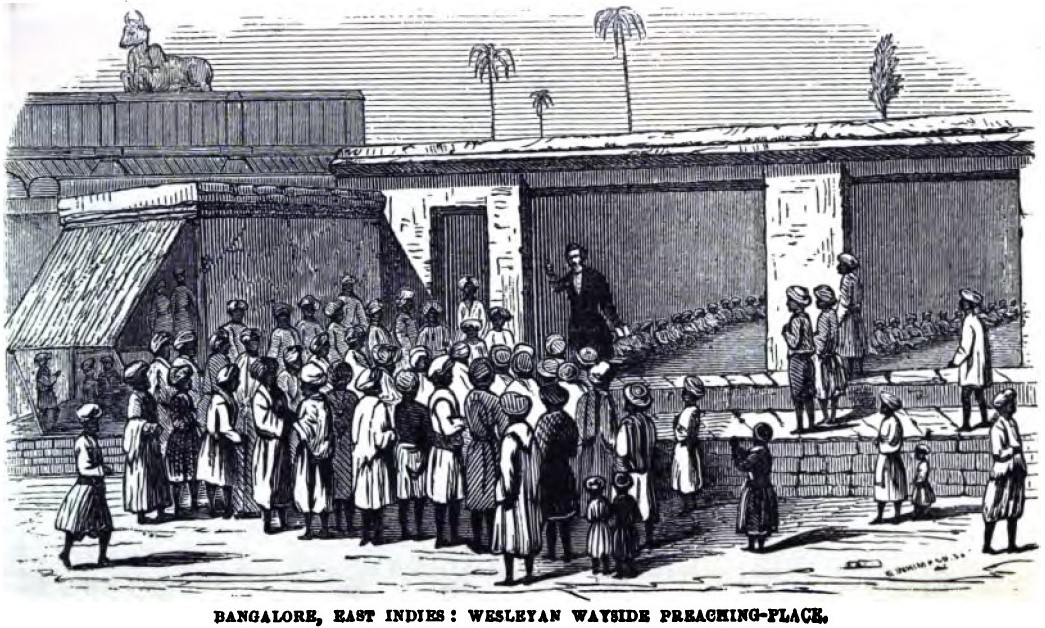
Wesleyan Wayside Canarese Chapel at the Bangalore Petah (1856)

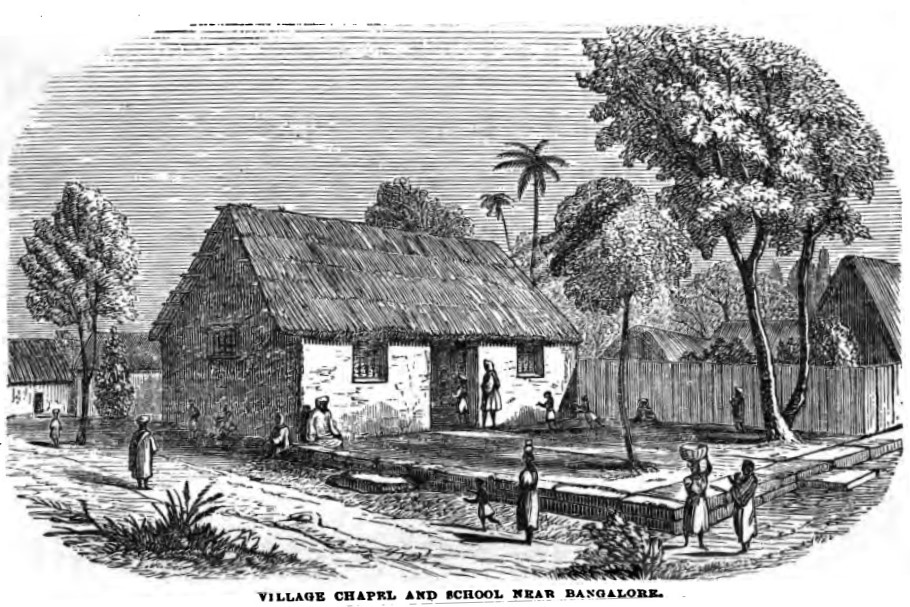
Wesleyan Village Chapel and School Near Bangalore by Thomas Hodson (1859)

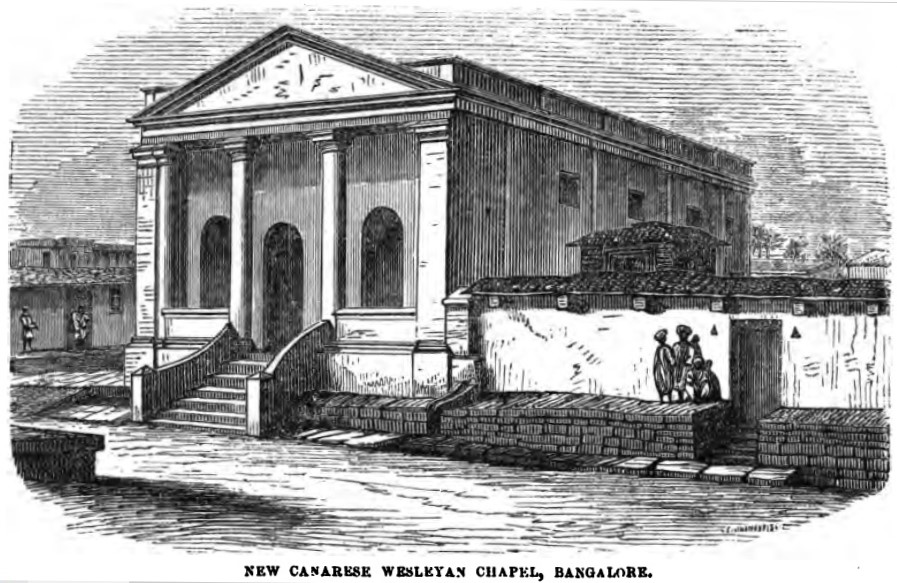
New Canarese Wesleyan Chapel, Bangalore (January 1860, p.2, XVII)

In 1834, Thomas Hodson of the Wesleyan Mission, purchased about 20 acres of land, just outside the Bangalore Petah (the current United Mission School and College, Unity Buildings, etc., a painting of the same is in the possession of the Museum of Sydney). In the same year, Hodson had to take up the role of Supervisor of the Wesleyan Tamil Mission in the Bangalore Cantonment. During his tenure, he started an Anglo-Tamil school in the Bangalore Civil and Military Station. The reputation of the school spread, and several respected Hindu gentlemen of the Petah, requested Hodson to open a Canarese School in the Petah. Hence, a room was rented within the Fort walls and Wesleyan Mission Canarese School was started. In this room, Hodson preached his first sermon in Canarese in 1835.

=== William Arthur's description ===
According to William Arthur (an Irishman, after whom the William Arthur Memorial Church at Goobie is named after), the Wesleyan Canarese Mission was located in the Bangalore Petah, three miles from the Wesleyan Tamil Mission house. The land for the Wesleyan Canarese Mission was obtained by Thomas Hodson, and was located just outside one of the town gates. Initially, it was a school with a school room which served as the residence of the school master. The school provided English education. Thereafter Mr. Webber was sent to the mission. In 1840, Garrett and Jenkins were appointed as Wesleyan Canarese missionaries, with an authority to build a printing press and a mission-house. Thus was established the Wesleyan Mission Press, with the funding coming from English gentry.

=== Thomas Hodson's Description ===
Further, according to Thomas Hodson, the old town (Bangalore Petah) was surrounded by a wall (Bangalore Fort), with a moat which was dry and full of trees and thorny shrubs. The Wesleyan Canarese missionaries just lived outside the walls, near the town gates. Here they had a printing press where tracks, scriptures were prepared in Canarese. The premises also had a native school for boys and young men. A room in the end of the school was set aside for Christian worship. The Wesleyan missionaries wanted to build a chapel, but had difficulty finding a plot for the building. Hence, they preached on the streets on the street corners. They finally managed to buy an old dwelling by public auction in 1856, which had its front walls knocked off and some alterations made. This served as a wayside preaching chapel. It had two rooms, where 80 children were taught to read and write Canarese. So the chapel also served as a school. Thrice a week, missionaries preached from this wayside chapel, which attracted a crowd of 80-100 people who stood on the street to listen, while the children stayed inside the building, behind the preacher. The sketch of the Wesleyan Wayside Canarese Chapel appeared in the July 1857 issue of the 'Wesleyan Juvenile Offering' magazine.

=== Sarah Sanderson's Description ===
Writing on 24 November 1858, Sarah Sanderson (wife of Rev. Daniel Sanderson), describes the Wesleyan Mission School and Chapel in a Pariah village near the Bangalore Petah. The article also carried a sketch of the same, by Thomas Hodson. The Mission School and Chapel was raised by contributions from women of Hammersmith and Brentford, sent through Ms. E Farmer, contributions totaling to £12 or BINR 150. This school had some 30 children, 22 boys and 8 girls. They were taught by John a native catechist. Divine services were held on Sundays in Canarese at 7:30AM. The congregation consisted of 8-10 men and 25-30 children, and many others listening from outside the door. However, most seemed to attend out of curiosity of seeing the European ladies and men. The church services commenced by ringing the bell. Further, she describes the social scorn and humiliation suffered by the Pariah community and how the church was helping them to gain confidence and dignity by providing education.

Further, Sarah Sanderson, writing on 24 September 1859, describes the new Canarese Wesleyan Chapel (predecessor to the Hudson Memorial Church) which was consecrated a few months before September 1859. To the left of the Wesleyan Chapel was a low building, which had been altered and white-washed to serve as a school. The cost of building the chapel and vestries behind and the altering the building to the left all cost £460. Except for £11.10s which was donated by sponsors from Leeds, the rest of the funds came out of profits of the printing press.

=== Samuel Dalzell's Description ===
Writing on 10 July 1866 from Bangalore, Rev. Samuel Dalzell, talks about the Wesleyan Girls School in the Bangalore Petah, which Mrs. Dalzell had taken over as the superintendent. He describe that the girls school had become small and almost useless, with only 33 girls attending school regularly. Mrs. Dalzell, tried to propose the saying of morning prayers in the school, which was protested by the natives, leading to a number of students being stopped from attending school. However, they returned soon afterwards.

=== Early Sketches of the Wesleyan Mission ===
A series of sketches associated with Wesleyan Mission School, currently in the possession of the Museum of Sydney and Basel Mission, Switzerland can be seen at the links below:

- Sketch 1: School and schoolhouse, Bangalore - Hodson's letter Dec 24 1836 / Thomas Hodson (1836). The present premises of the United Mission School and Unity Buildings. The Kempe Gowda Tower of Lalbagh can be seen at a distance.
- Sketch 2: The Wesleyan Mission Chapel re-built by the Revd. J. Garrett 1846 (Drawn by J Rozario [?] Junior Scholar High School)(1846)
- Sketch 3: Wesleayn Mission High School in Bangalore (1871 to 1891)

== London Mission School, 1847 ==
In 1834, William Campbell of the London Mission raised a chapel on Infantry Road (between St. Andrew's Church and St. Paul's) in the Bangalore Civil and Military Station and, incurring a cost of BINR 8000 raised by public subscription, where services were held in Tamil, English and Canarese. In the same year, Campbell obtained land in the main thoroughfare of the Bangalore Petah and a Canarese Chapel (predecessor to the present Rice Memorial Church on Avenue Road) was raised and the Canarese services was moved there. The chapel also served as a school and venue for religious discussions with the locals. In 1839, the Petah Chapel was extended to accommodate the growing congregation. In 1845, there was a further extension, and the chapel was also used as an English day school.

In 1840, Mrs. Sewell, wife of Rev. James Sewell, opened the first Canarese Girls School for the natives at the Bangalore Peta. It was the first time native girls were able to attend school in this region. Rice prepared the textbooks in Canarese for teaching Geography and Arithmetic. In 1842, Rice and his wife started boarding at the Canarese School. The school still exists today, located on Mission Road (named after the London Mission), Bangalore and is now called the Mitralaya Girls High School . The school was supervised by Jane Rice till her death in 1864, when the school had around 400 girl students. After the death of Jane, Benjamin married Catherine Muller, a widow of the German missionary Rev. J J Muller, and daughter of Rev. C T E Rhenius (both of the Church Missionary Society, who served at Suviseshapuram in Tinnevelly). Catherine took charge of the boarding school along with her daughter Harriet. Catherine died in 1887, after which Harriet Muller took official charge of the boarding house, serving till 1911 when she retired.

To impart English Education, in 1847, Rev. Benjamin Holt Rice (after whom the Rice Memorial Church is named after) of the London Mission established the Anglo-Vernacular School at Sultanpet, Bangalore, with 100 students. By 1859, there were 397 students, and the school moved into a new building.

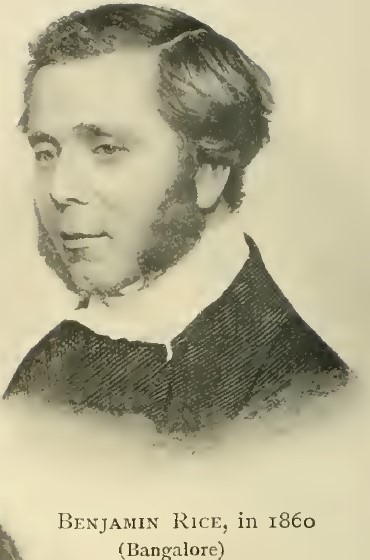
Benjamin Rice in 1860

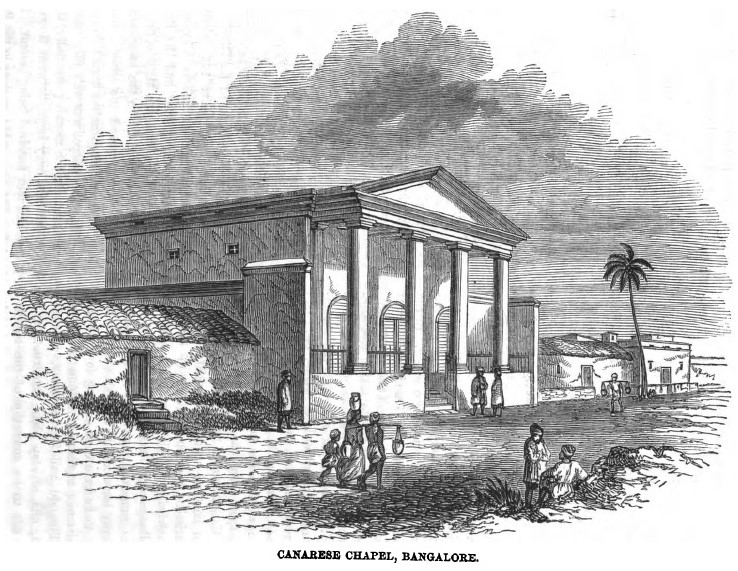
Canarese Chapel, Bangalore, 1851

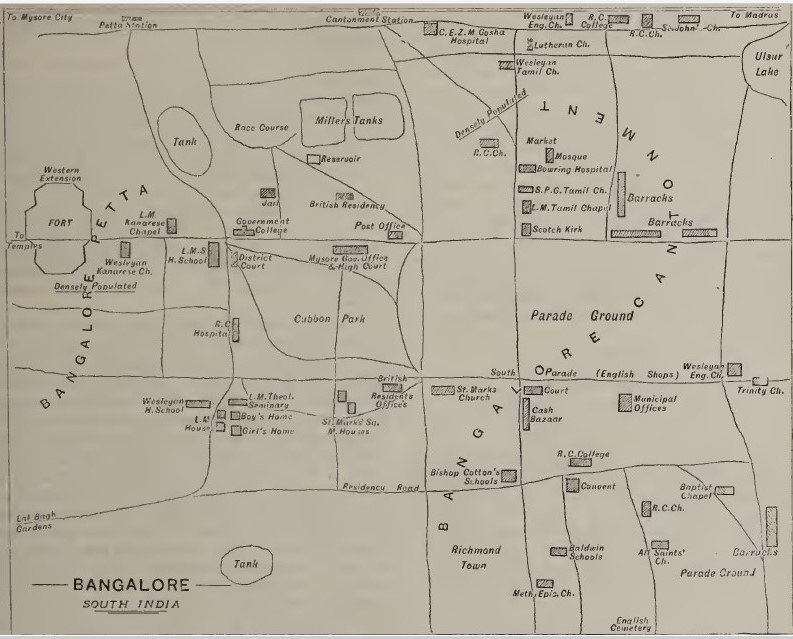
Bangalore, South India, 1898, Rough Map by Rev. T E Slater of LMS showing the location of the London Mission School

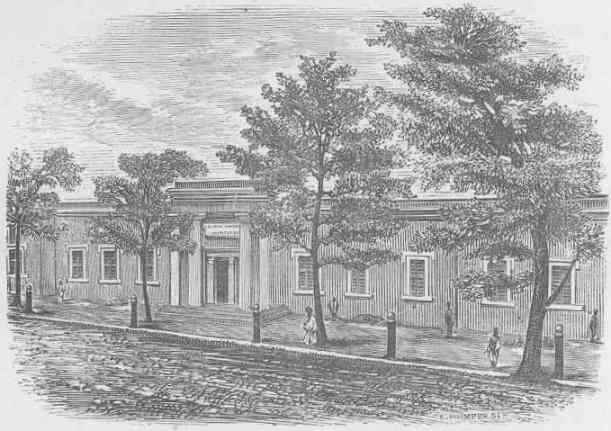
London Mission Bangalore Institution (LMS, 1869, p. 55)

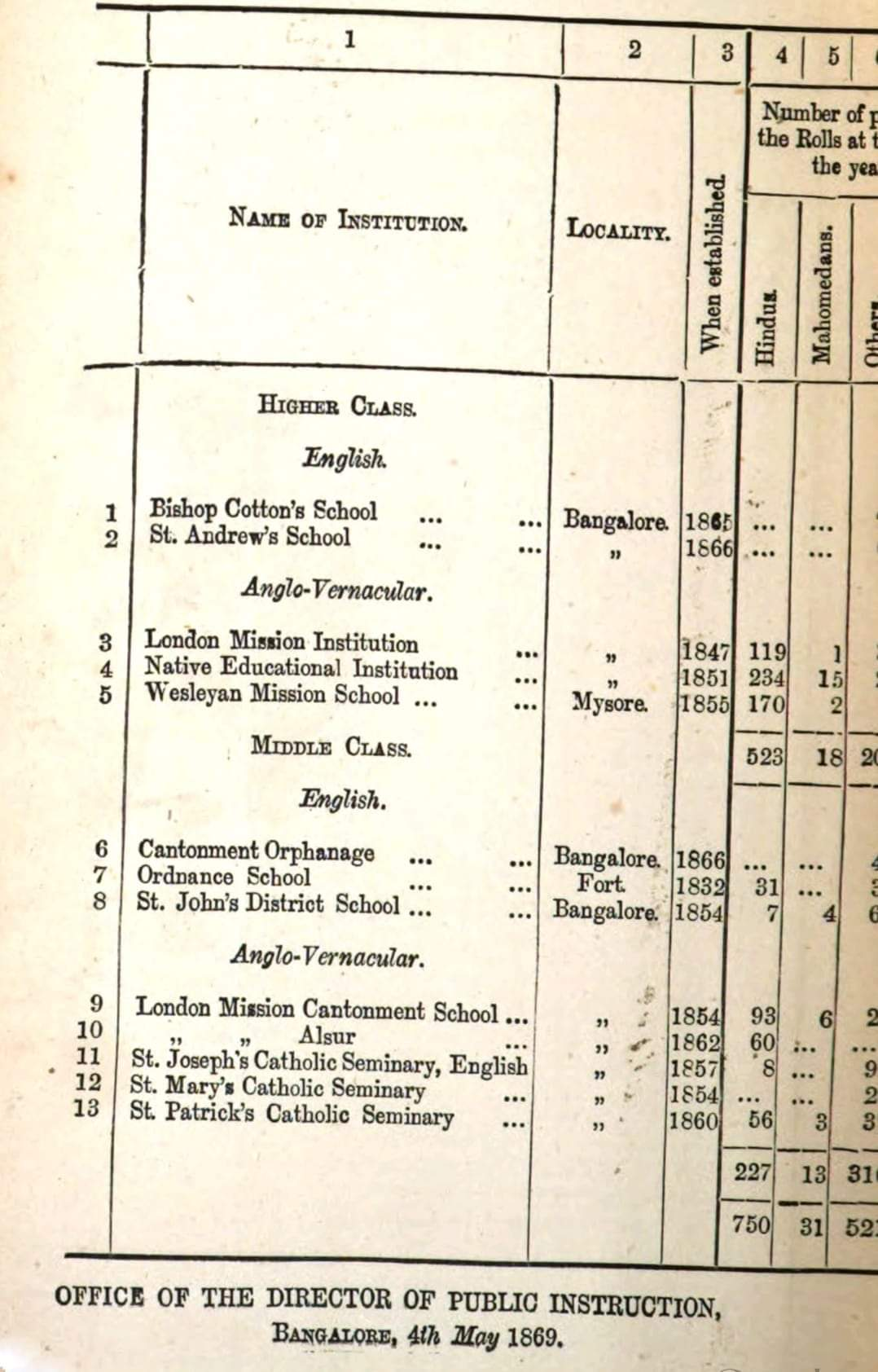
Oldest schools of Bangalore

== United Mission School, 1920 ==
According to the forum Bangalore- photos from a bygone age, in 1920, the Wesleyan Mission and the London Mission merged to form the United Mission. At that time, the London Mission School was operating in the Bangalore Petah near the Mysore Bank (opposite to the present Kaveri Bhavan, next to present Shikshakara Bhavana). The Wesleyan Mission had a school operating in the Bangalore Petah. These two schools merged to form the United Mission School. The present Unity Building was built on the football ground of the school.

== M K Gandhi's Visit, 1929 ==
The London Mission Chronicle records the visit of M K Gandhi to the school on 29 July 1929. A large crowd wanted to attend the event. But admission was restricted to staff and pupils of Mitralaya, missionaries of the LMS, and staff of the 2 LMS girl's day schools and the Wesleyan Mission School. The event started by singing the hymn Land of our Birth by Rudyard Kipling. The hymn was also used by Gandhi in his address to stress on the importance of sacrifice. A garland of spices was presented to him by the students. The school head mistress Ms. Mathai in her address expressed sympathy for Gandhi's cause. The proceedings ended with singing of the school anthem in English and the Tagore's Bengali national anthem.

== Noted alumni ==
- Sir M Visvesvaraya
- Kengal Hanumanthaiah
- Mirza Ismail
- K Chengalaraya Reddy

== See also ==
- Thomas Hodson
- Rice Memorial Church
- Hudson Memorial Church, Bangalore
