= Edward Sargent =

Edward Sargent may refer to:

- Edward Sargent (architect), American architect
- Edward Sargent (bishop), Anglican priest
- Edward H. Sargent, Canadian scientist
- Eddie Sargent, politician in Ontario, Canada
