= Hudson Memorial Church, Bengaluru =

Hudson Memorial Church
- Josiah Hudson Memorial Church, Bangalore
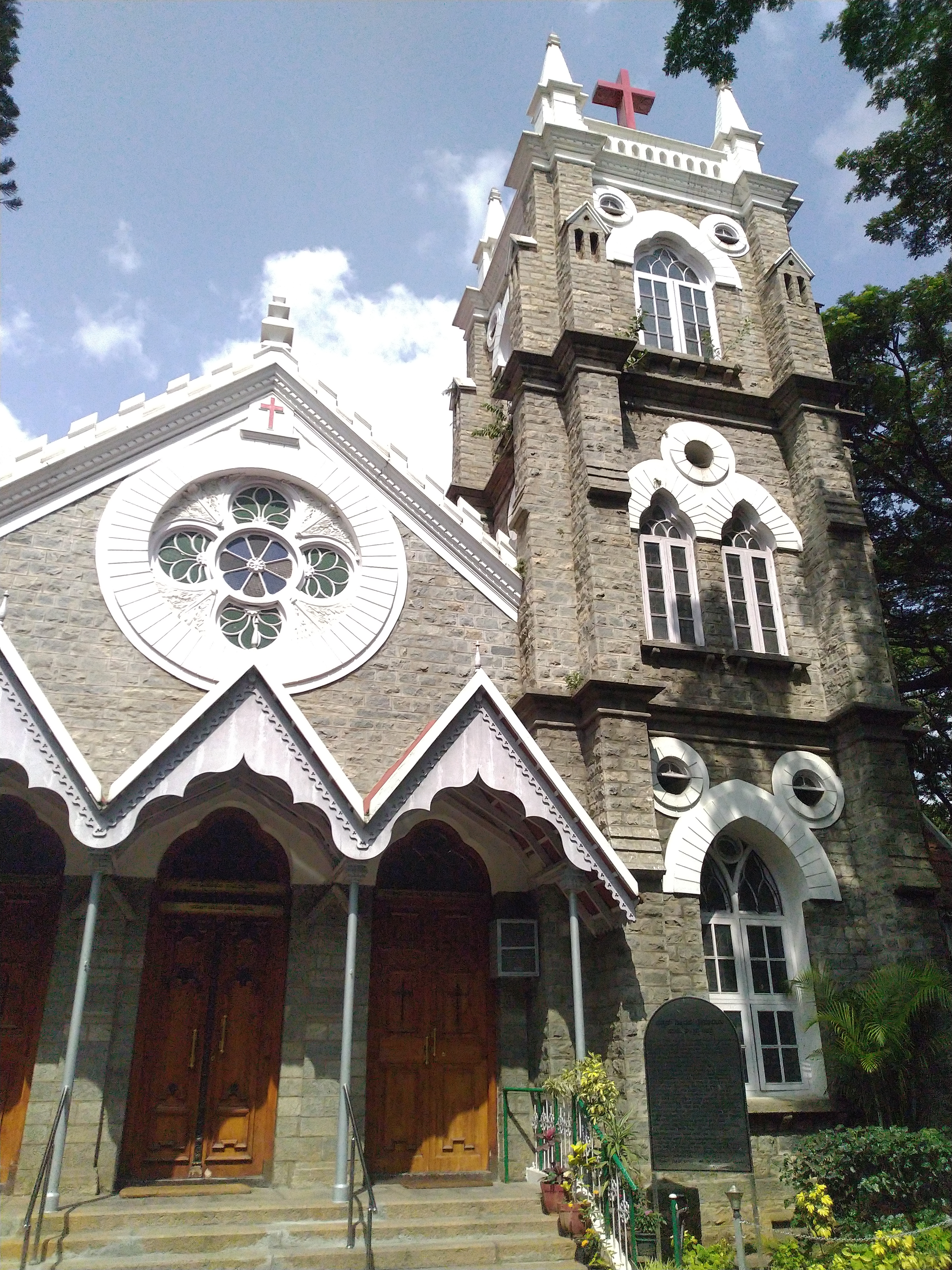
- Entrance of Hudson Memorial Church
- Hudson Memorial Church
- 12°58′03″N 77°35′16″E
- Location: Bangalore
- Country: India
- Denomination: Church of South India
- Tradition: Wesleyan

History
- Former name(s): Canarese Wesleyan Chapel, Bangalore
- Consecrated: 23 September 1904

Architecture
- Architectural type: Classical Gothic
- Construction cost: BINR 25000

Administration
- Diocese: Karnataka Central Diocese

Clergy
- Bishop: Rt. Rev. Dr. Prasana Kumar Samuel

The Hudson Memorial Church is located in the Bangalore Pete, Hudson Circle, surrounded by the Office of the Bangalore Corporation, Ulsoor Gate Police Station, Cubbon Park and Kanteerava Stadium. The church was established in 1904, and is a Kannada CSI church of the Bangalore Diocese. The church has around 4000 registered members and is named after Rev. Josiah Hudson, a missionary, Canarese scholar and educationist who started many Canarese schools in the Bangalore Petah region. The church was earlier known as the Wesleyan Mission Canarese Chapel, and was located in Ganikara Street, Nagarathpet, and moved the current location at Hudson Circle and renamed as Hudson Memorial Church in 1904. The church attracts people of all faiths, who visit the church to seek blessing, especially in Thursdays and Sundays.

== History ==
The earliest record of Kannada missionaries preaching in the Bangalore Petah area is in 1822. These missionaries were from the Wesleyan Mission and London Missionary Society. They started schools around the petah in 1825. The church has its origin at the Wesleyan Mission School with a chapel in its premises, which existed between 1840 and 1849. The Wesleyan pastors who were active at this time were John Garret (who translated the Bhagavad Gita into Canarese), Edward Hardy, John Gastec, Philip Webber and Daniel Sanderson (who along with Rev. Reeve of the LMS, compiled the first English Canarese dictionary). During this time Kannada church services were help at the Wesleyan Mission School and the chapel. Records of baptisms in this period exists at the Hudson Memorial Church. In 1857, the first native Kannada preachers joined the Wesleyan Mission, with the first pastor being Andrew Philip.

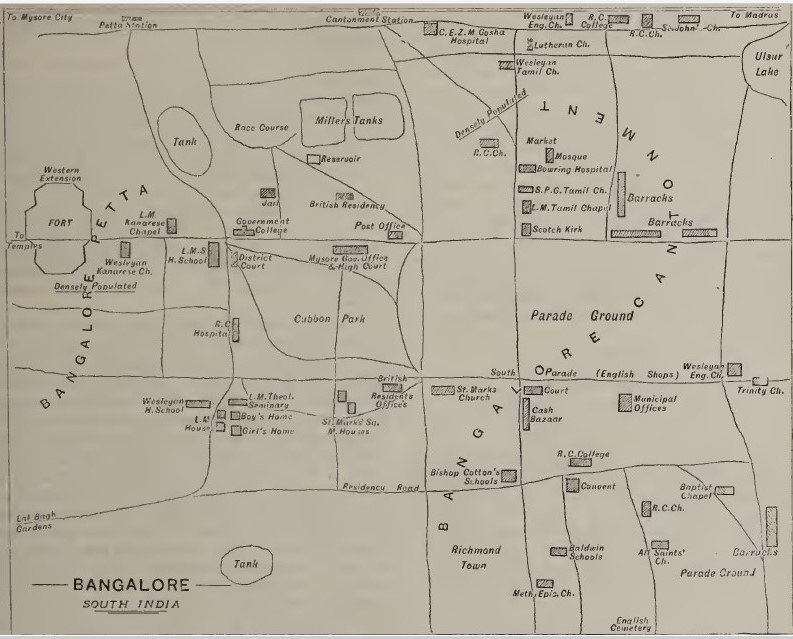
Bangalore, South India, 1898, Rough Map by Rev. T E Slater of LMS showing the location of the Wesleyan Canarese Chapel

The church's predecessor was the Wesleyan Mission Canarese Chapel (not to be confused with the London Missionary Society Canarese Chapel, now Rice Memorial Church on Avenue Road), which was established in 1859 at Gaanigarapet (now Nagarethpet). Prior to that the site was used as a Wayside Chapel from 1856 to 1859. The chapel was built in a narrow street of Gaanigarapet or Main Street, which is the present Nagarethpet. The chapel was surrounded by Gangamma Halli, Ballapuradapete, Potter's Street and Chakkaliyarugala Halli. Known by the natives as Gudi Hatti or Peta Chapel, the church faced much opposition from the locals, and often church services had to be conducted with police protection. The chapel was used for nearly 45 years. The pastors who served the Peta Chapel were Robert William Faradize, Abijah Samuel, Josiah Hudson, J A Vanes and T Luke. Of these Josiah Hudson was a prominent Wesleyan pastor, who has local pastors Samuel Abijah and T Luke serving under him.

By 1904, the small chapel could not accommodate its 250 members and hence a need rose to build a new bigger church. In 1900, Rev J A Vanes, a Wesleyan missionary of the purchased the present church land, and a new stone church building was constructed and named after Rev. Josiah Hudson, a Wesleyan missionary and pastor of the Canarse chapel, who helped start many schools in the Bangalore Pete area (not to be confused with Thomas Hodson, another Wesleyan Missionary who helped establish the first Wesleyan Canarese Chapel in 1856).

== Wesleyan Canarese Mission ==
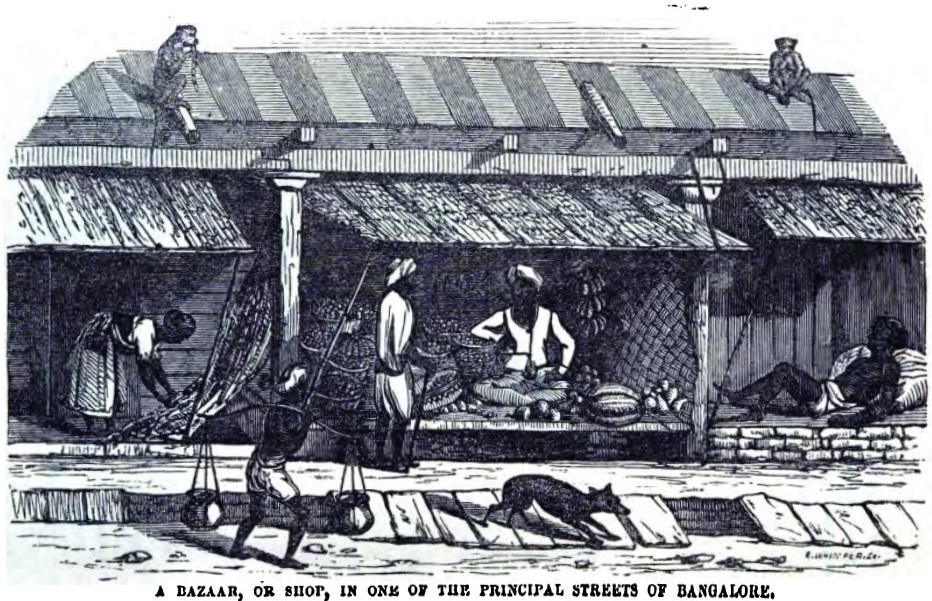
A Bazar, or Shop, in One of the Principal Streets of Bangalore (p.97, 1856)

According to William Arthur (an Irishman, after whom the William Arthur Memorial Church at Goobie is named after), the Wesleyan Canarese Mission was located in the Bangalore Petah, at about 3 miles from the Wesleyan Tamil Mission house. The land for the Wesleyan Canarese Mission was obtained by Thomas Hodson, and was located just outside one of the town gates. Initially, it was a school with a school room which served as the residence of the school master. The school provided English education and considerable number of students were enrolled. Thereafter Mr. Webber was sent to this mission. In 1840, Garrett and Jenkins were appointed as Wesleyan Canarese missionaries, with an authority to build a printing press and a mission-house. Thus was established the Wesleyan Mission Press, with the funding coming from English gentry. The missionaries started to preach in the streets of the petah in the early hours of the day. The sermon was simple Christian concepts such as unity of God, atonement of Christ, etc.

== Wesleyan Wayside Canarese Chapel, 1856 ==
Thomas Hodson in 1856, describes Bangalore as consisting of two parts - the Cantonment where the soldiers lived and Tamil was primarily spoken, and the Old Town (Petah) where Canarese was the main language. In both parts a total of 130,000 Indians lived. Further he describes the shops of the Bangalore petah, with mud being used for the walls and the floor, wooden pillars and clay used for flat roofs. There were no windows or any protection from the dust, with a mat from the rooftop for shade. At night, the shops were secured by wooden shutters. The shop-keeper sat on the floor of the shop, or on one of the lower shelves. The traders were cloth merchants, grocers, gold smiths, etc. The shops sold sugarcane, coconut, bananas, rice, sweets which were hung on a string and various grains which were kept in baskets with were smeared with cow-dung. Water carriers carrying water was a common site. There were thousands of monkeys which created mischief, but were unharmed by the natives due to their religious beliefs.

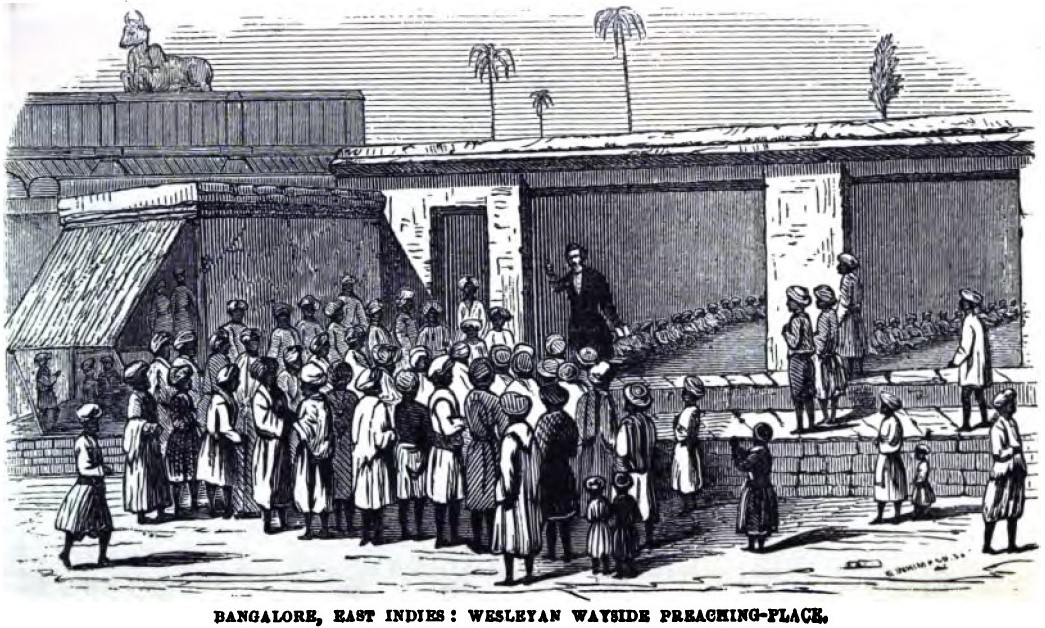
Wesleyan Wayside Canarese Chapel at the Bangalore Petah (1856)

Further, according to Thomas Hodson, the Cantonment had a Wesleyan Chapel for Tamil and English services (the current Wesley Tamil Church, Haines Road, Fraser Town, and East Parade Church, M G Road). The old town was surrounded by a wall (Bangalore Fort), with a moat which was dry and full of trees and thorny shrubs. The Wesleyan Canarese missionaries just lived outside the walls, near the town gates. Here they had a printing press where tracks, scriptures were prepared in Canarese. The premises also had a native school for boys and young men. A room in the end of the school was set aside for Christian worship. The Wesleyan missionaries wanted to build a chapel, but had difficulty finding a suitable plot for the building. Hence, they preached on the streets on the street corners. They finally managed to buy an old dwelling by public auction in 1856, which had its front walls knocked off and some alterations made. This served as a wayside preaching chapel. It had 2 rooms, where 80 children were taught to read and write Canarese. So the chapel also served as a school. Thrice a week, missionaries preached from this wayside chapel, which attracted a crowd of 80-100 people who stood on the street to listen, while the children stayed inside the building, behind the preacher. The sketch of the Wesleyan Wayside Canarese Chapel appeared in the July 1857 issue of the 'Wesleyan Juvenile Offering' magazine.

== Canarese Wesleyan Chapel, 1859 ==
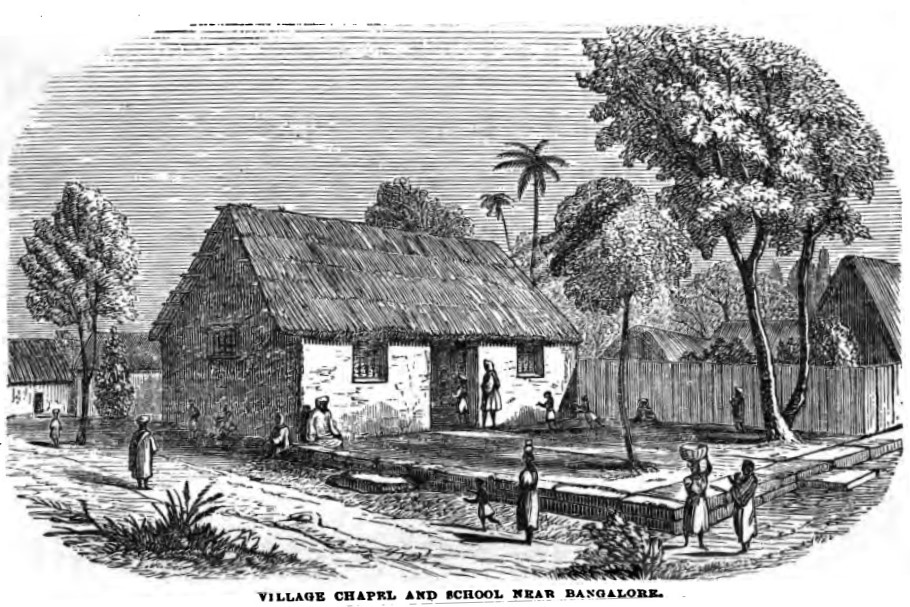
Wesleyan Village Chapel and School Near Bangalore by Thomas Hodson (1859)

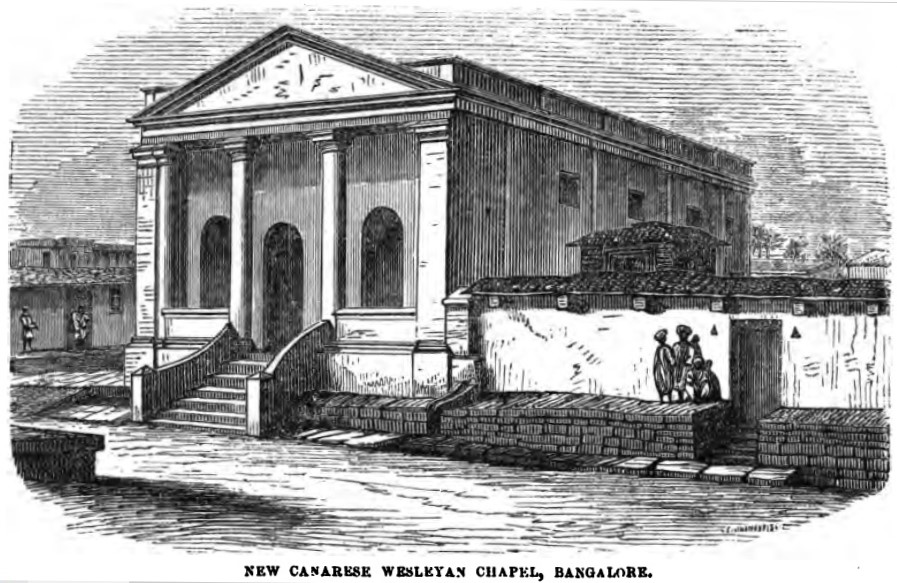
New Canarese Wesleyan Chapel, Bangalore (January 1860, p.2, XVII) - Copy.jpg

Writing on 24 November 1858, Sarah Sanderson (wife of Rev. Daniel Sanderson), describes the Wesleyan Mission School and Chapel in a Pariah village near the Bangalore Petah. The article also carried a sketch of the same, by Thomas Hodson. The Mission School and Chapel was raised by contributions from women of Hammersmith and Brentford, sent through Ms. E Farmer, contributions totaling to £12 or BINR 150. This school had some 30 children, 22 boys and 8 girls. They were taught by John a native catechist. Divine services were held on Sundays in Canarese at 7:30AM. The congregation consisted of 8-10 men and 25-30 children, and many others listening from outside the door. However, most seemed to attend out of curiosity of seeing the European ladies and men. The church services commenced by ringing the bell. Further, she describes the social scorn and humiliation suffered by the Pariah community and how the church was helping them to gain confidence and dignity by providing education.

Further, Sarah Sanderson, writing on 24 September 1859, describes the pettah as the native town of Bangalore with a population of about 60,000. The petah now had 2 Christian churches, one was the London Mission Canarese Chapel (now Rice Memorial Church on Avenue Road) and the other was the Canarese Wesleyan Chapel opened a few months before September 1859. To the left of the Wesleyan Chapel was a low building, which had been altered and white-washed to serve as a school. The cost of building the chapel and vestries behind and the altering the building to the left all cost £460. Except for £11.10s which was donated by sponsors from Leeds, the rest of the funds came out of profits of the printing press. The chapel did not have pews or a gallery. The floor was covered with bamboo matting, and there were rows of benches with seats of fancy cane-work (or rattan). 8 oil lamps using coconut oil were suspended from the ceiling to be used to lighting in the evenings. The windows which were generally kept open had iron bars to keep out the monkeys. Further, she says that her children liked walking the busy streets of the pettah to reach the chapel along with their father.

Sarah describes some events such as a postman walking up to the pulpit to deliver a letter to the preacher in the middle of his sermon on a Sunday. Another, when the Muslim mourning of 'Moharrum' was being observed when she attended church one evening. The people used to walk in and out of the chapel as they pleased. All so different from the quiet atmosphere of any Wesleyan Chapel in England.

== Hudson Memorial, 1904 ==
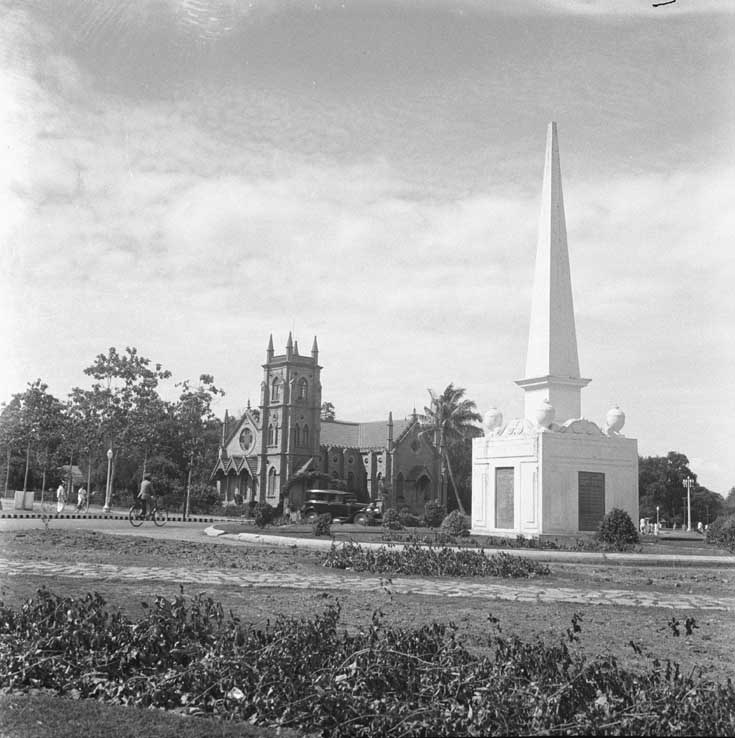
Hudson Memorial seen behind the Memorial Obelisk raised for the Men who fell in the Siege of Bangalore, 1791. (The memorial was vandalised on 28 October 1964)

The congregation of the Canarese Wesleyan Chapel soon grew to 250, and the present building was congested. Hence a need rose to look for a large plot of land to build a bigger church. At the time, a certain Dr. Aayachamma who was related to Dr. Arokyam Pillay, sold the land of present church to Rev J A Vanes on 19 January 1900, for INR 2000. The church was consecrated on 23 September 1904, Friday 4PM, in memory of the Josiah Hudson by his daughter Mrs. Thorp from Mysore. The first service was conducted by Hudson's son-in-law W H Throp. The first sermon was delivered by Rev E P Rice of the London Missionary Society, under the header 'Put off thy shoes form thy feet for the place where thou standest is a holy ground'. The consecration service was attended by around 600 people, and offering of INR 400 was collected. A public meeting was presided by D A Rees of the Wesleyan Mission. G W Sawday and T Luke addressed the gathering in Canarese and H Guildford in English. The events were closed with a prayer in Tamil by Fred Goodwill.

The cost of building the church was INR 25000, raised by contributions. The Century Fund Movement contributed INR 5276, Christians from the province INR 528, missionaries and friends INR 4429, The Maharani of Mysore contributed INR300 and the Dewan of Mysore INR200.

== Architecture ==
The church is stone building in the Gothic architecture with no intervening pillars. The building could now hold 500 people. The architect of the building was J H Stephen, who also donated the circular glass over the door. The communion table, pulpit, reading desk chairs were carved from teak at the Industrial School at Karur. The marble floor of the chancel was donated in the memory of Mrs. Vanes. An anonymous donor contributed towards the church bell. The pipe organ was donated by Mr. Darling. The Bible and hymn books were donated by Mr. and Mrs. Throp. At that time, the land was surrounded by fields, gardens and ponds, and the Gothic structure in midst of these was an imposing view. The church has 9 faces and opening. The altar can be seen from anywhere inside the church. The podium is raised above the road level using a ramp and steps. A mural of 9.7m x 14.5 depicts the nativity scene in Jerusalem.

== Restoration ==
The church underwent extensive restoration at around the year 2000. The restoration work was conducted under the Chairmanship of then Presbyter in charge Late. Rev. P. K. Simon John & also is recorded by Late Ronnie Johnson, as appeared on his blog, in form of many photos taken during the restoration.

== 110 Years Celebrations ==
The Hudson Memorial Church, Bangalore, celebrated its 110 years on 23 September 2013. The Chief Minister of Karnataka Siddaramaiah and the Home Mister K J George were supposed to be attendance, however could not make it. On this occasion, several people travelled from far to be a part of this ceremony. M S Ramanujan, the Chief Post Master General, Karnataka Circle, released a stamp to commemorate the 110 years of the church. Events such as Ikebana, painting and choreography were held. Meritorious students from the church were given scholarships and awards.

== Controversies ==
In 2012, the Deccan Herald reported that a police complaint had been filed in the Ulsoor Gate Police Station, against the secretary, pastorate committee members and management committee members of the Hudson Memorial Church, alleging breach of trust leading to financial losses for the church. In 2010, a cheating case was registered in the same police station against a church member for alleged cheating.

== List of presbyters (from 1904) ==
- Rev D A Rees 1904
- Rev H Premaka 1904 – 1905
- Rev W E Tomlinson 1905 – 1906
- Rev Brockbank 1906 – 1907
- Rev Andrew Philip 1907 – 1910
- Rev John Mark 1911 – 1912
- Rev D Sathyaveeriah 1912 – 1914
- Rev E S. Edward 1915 – 1916
- Rev B A. Amrit 1917 – 1921
- Rev G Wesley 1922 – 1923
- Rev D Bankapur 1923 – 1925
- Rev B A. Amrit 1926 – 1930
- Rev D Guruputra 1931 – 1933
- Rev Thomappa 1934 – 1936
- Rev J Bhaktishiromani 1937 – 1944
- Rev P Gurushantha 1945 – 1947
- Rev Victor Karl 1947 – 1949
- Rev V Benjamin B D 1950 – 1953
- Rev M Ananda Murthy 1954 – 1956
- Rev G Yesuvanuja 1956 – 1963
- Rev G Somasundara 1963 – 1974
- Rev Benjamin Dorai Raj 1974 – 1981
- Rev S A Salins 1981 – 1982
- Rev G Somasundara 1982 – 1983
- Rev D Sundara Raj 1983 – 1986
- Rev Chandrasekar Soans 1986 – 1989
- Rev Karunakara 1989 – 1990
- Rev Olvin Prabhakar 1990 – 1992
- Rev A P Ranjan 1992 – 1993
- Rev Edwin Vinod Kumar 1993 – 1996
- Rev P K Simon John 1996 – 2001
- Rev M M George 2001 – 2006
- Rev Olvin Prabhakar 2006 – 2011
- Rev V P Ashwal 2011 – 2013
- Rev William Jones 2013 - 2015
- Rev. Solomon Thomas 2015-

== Wesleyan Mission Press ==
The Wesleyan Mission Press, located in the Bangalore Petah is credited with printing and publishing some of the earliest printed material in Canarese. Some of these works were

- A Dictionary, Canarese and English, by Rev. W Reeve, revised and enlarged by Daniel Sanderson, 1858
- A Grammatical Volcabulary in English and Canarese, by M Ramasamy, 1858
- An Elementary Grammar of the Kannada or Canarese Language, by Thomas Hodson, 1864
- Dialogues in Canarese, by Munshi Shrinivasiah, English Translation by Richard G Hodson, Revised by Rev. Daniel Sanderson, 1865
- English and Canarese Vocabulary of Familiar Words with Easy Sentences, 1864
- Katha Sangraha (Canarese Selections), by Daniel Sanderson, 1865
- The Seventy Stories in Canarese, 1860 (A series of progressive lessons in Canarese)

== Sketches ==
A photo of the Hudson Memorial Church, from the Fred Goodwill collection, dated early 20th century, cannot be displayed here due to licensing issues. Can be viewed at the below link

- Image 1: Hudson Memorial Church, Bangalore

== See also ==
- Rice Memorial Church
- Thomas Hodson
- United Mission School
