= Daniel Sanderson =

Wesleyan missionary in India

- Born: Daniel Sanderson; 1810
- Known for: Missionary, Wesleyan Canarese Mission, Bangalore Petah and Gubbi, Linguist, Kannada Scholar
- Spouse: Sarah Sanderson

Daniel Sanderson was a Wesleyan missionary, who served in India, in the Wesleyan Canarese Mission, at the Bangalore Petah, Mysore, Tumkur and Gubbi, between 1842 and 1867. Sanderson was a linguist and a Kannada scholar. He is credited with co-authoring the first Kannada–English dictionary, published in 1858 by the Wesleyan Mission Press with the financial support by Sir Mark Cubbon. He also translated Lakshmisa's magnum opus, the Jaimini Bharata, into English. On return to England, he was appointed as the director of the Richmond Theological College.

== Sarah Sanderson ==
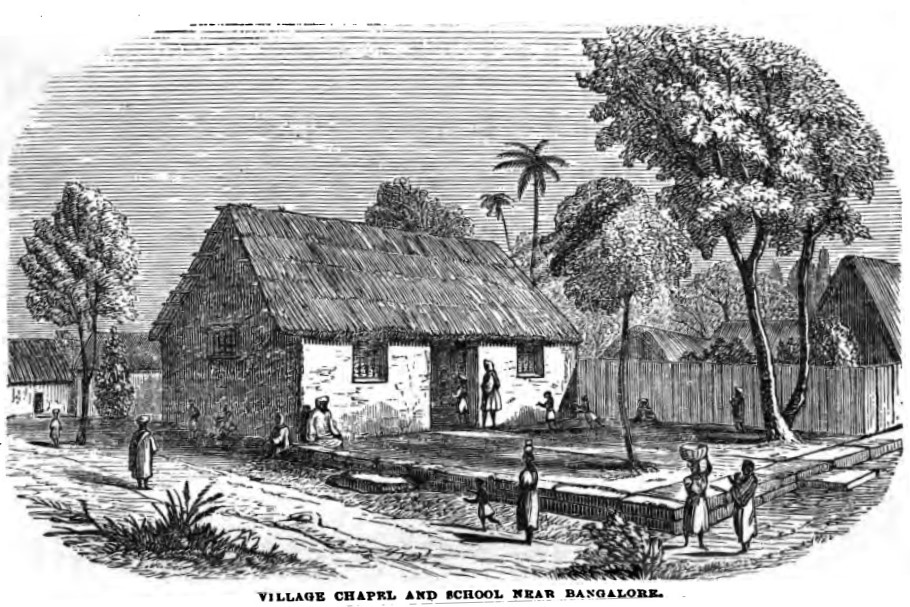
Wesleyan Village Chapel and School Near Bangalore by Thomas Hodson (1859)

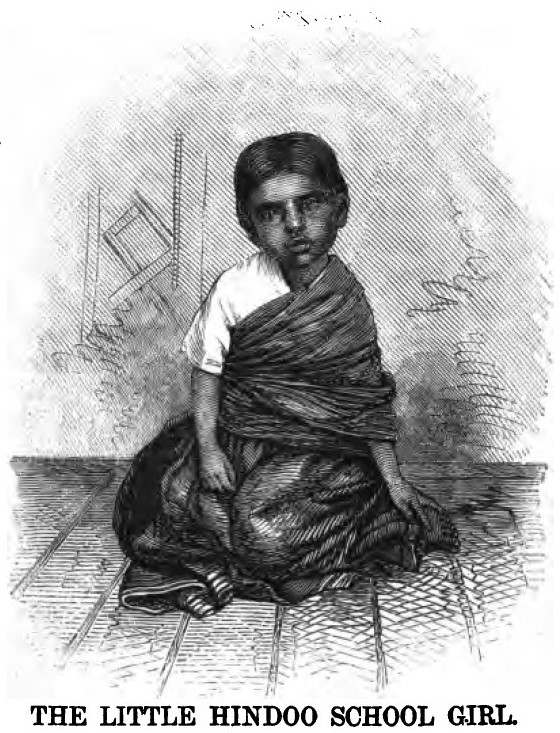
The Little Hindoo School Girl (p.81, June 1866, Sarah Sanderson)

Sarah Sanderson was the wife of Rev. Daniel Sanderson, who writing for the Wesleyan Juvenile Offering describes life in the Bangalore Pete in the 19th century. Writing on 24 November 1858, Sarah describes the Wesleyan Mission School and Chapel in a Pariah village near the Bangalore Petah. The article also carried a sketch of the same, by Thomas Hodson. This school had some 30 children, 22 boys and 8 girls. They were taught by John, a native catechist. Divine services were held on Sundays in Canarese at 7:30AM. The congregation consisted of 8–10 men and 25–30 children, and many others listening from outside the door. However, most seemed to attend out of curiosity of seeing the European ladies and men. The church services commenced by ringing the bell. Further, she describes the social scorn and humiliation suffered by the Pariah community, such as not being allowed to even walk in the street of the high caste people, untouchability practiced for the fear of pollution by lower castes. However, the Europeans readily employed servants from the Pariah communities and their children sent to Mission schools, brightening their employment prospects.

Further, Sarah Sanderson, writing on 24 September 1859, describes the pettah as the native town of Bangalore with a population of about 60,000. The petah had nearly 200–300 temples or shrines, whose deities were anointed with oil making them greasy and black, and offered flowers and fruit. The petah now had two Christian churches, one was the London Mission Canarese Chapel (now Rice Memorial Church on Avenue Road) and the other was the Canarese Wesleyan Chapel opened a few months before September 1859. To the left of the Wesleyan Chapel was a low building, which had been altered and white-washed to serve as a school. The chapel did not have pews or a gallery. The floor was covered with bamboo matting, and there were rows of benches with seats of fancy cane-work (or rattan). Eight oil lamps using coconut oil were suspended from the ceiling to be used to lighting in the evenings. The windows which were generally kept open had iron bars to keep out the monkeys. Further, she says that her children liked walking the busy streets of the petah to reach the chapel along with their father, observing its noise, local people, shops and the monkeys. Monkeys were numerous in the Petah, and created nuisance by stealing food and other things from people. Sarah describes some events such as a postman walking up to the pulpit to deliver a letter to the preacher in the middle of his sermon on a Sunday. Another, when the Muslim mourning of 'Moharrum' was being observed when she attended church one evening. The people used to walk in and out of the chapel as they pleased. All so different from the quiet atmosphere of any Wesleyan Chapel in England.

== Canarese Selections ==
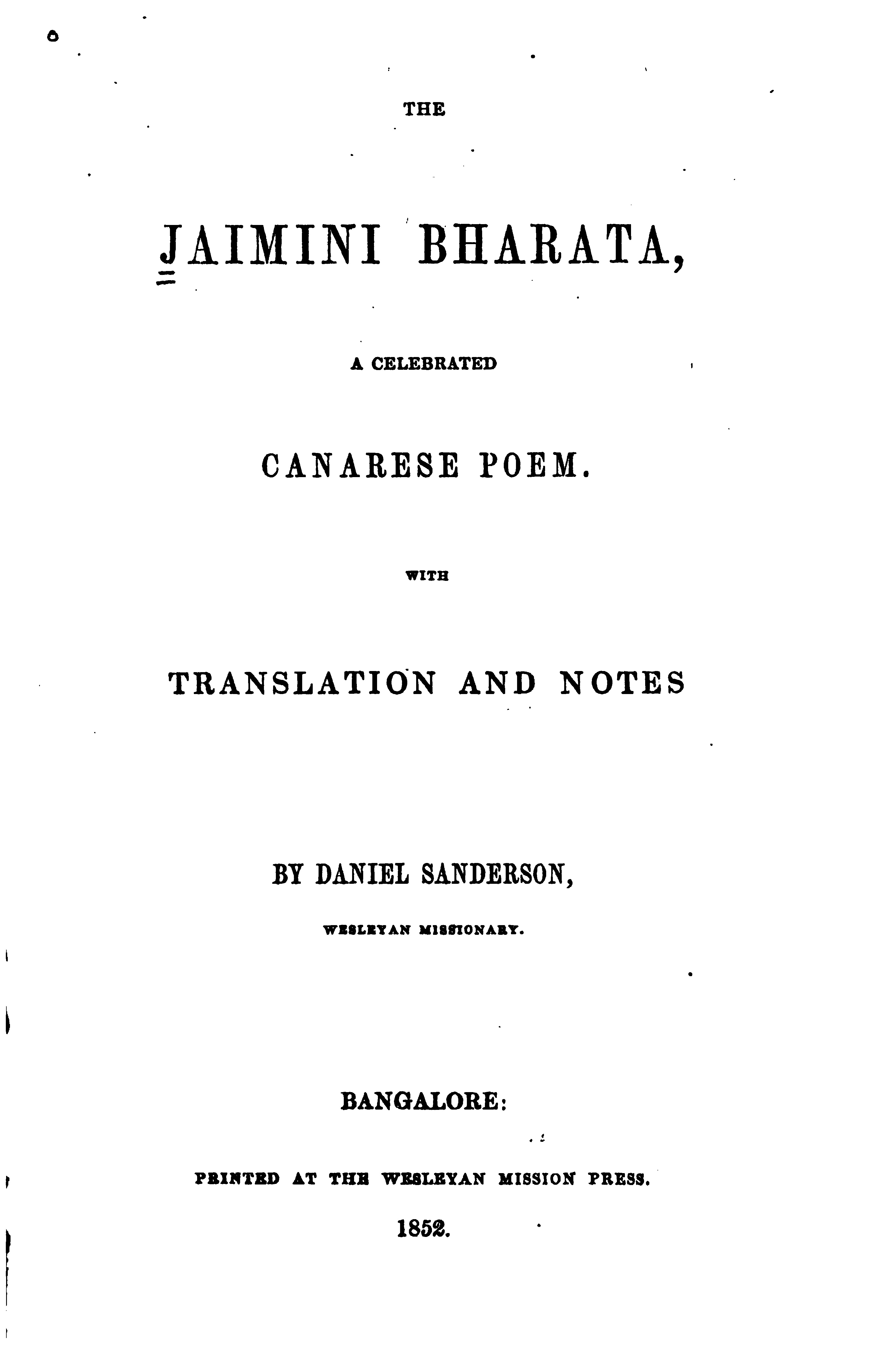
Jaimini Bharata, Wesleyan Mission Press, Bangalore, 1852

Daniel wrote the Katha sangraha or Canarese Selections: Prose which was published by the Wesleyan Mission Press in 1863. The work consists of six parts:

- Part I: Stories from the Panchatantra and various other sources
- Part II: Extracts from the Shiva Purana
- Part III: Extracts from the MahaBharata
- Part IV: Extracts from the Ramayana
- Part V: The Ten incarnations of Vishnu
- Part VI:

== Notable works ==
- A dictionary, Canarese and English (1858)
- The Jaimini Bharata: A Celebrated Canarese Poem, with Translations and Notes (1852)
- Dialogues in Canarese (1858)
- Katha sangraha or Canarese Selections: Prose (1863)

== See also ==
- Hudson Memorial Church, Bangalore
- Rice Memorial Church
- United Mission School
- William Arthur Memorial Church, Gubbi
