= Thomas Hodson =

English Wesleyan missionary in India

- Born: Thomas Hodson; 9 February 1804; North Scarle, Lincolnshire, UK
- Died: 9 September 1882 (aged 78); England
- Known for: Missionary, Wesleyan Canarese Mission, Bangalore Petah and Gubbi, Linguist, Kannada Scholar
- Spouse(s): Mary Ann Atkinson (1798–1866) and Sophia Simpson (born 1836)
- Children: Richard George Hodson (born 1830) and Margaret Hodson (born 1871)

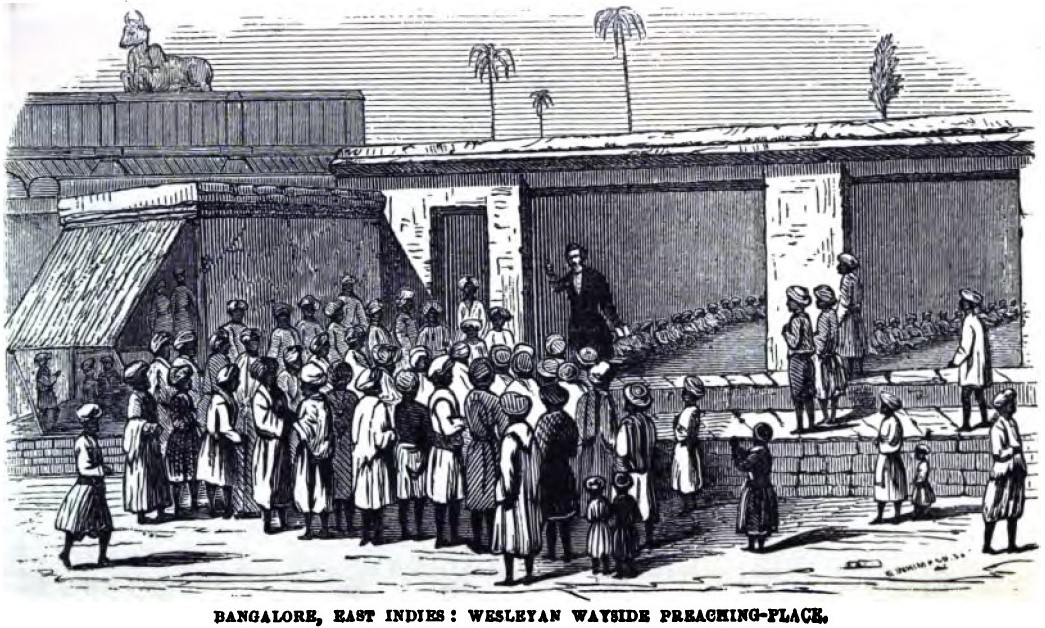
Wesleyan Wayside Canarese Chapel at the Bangalore Petah (1856)

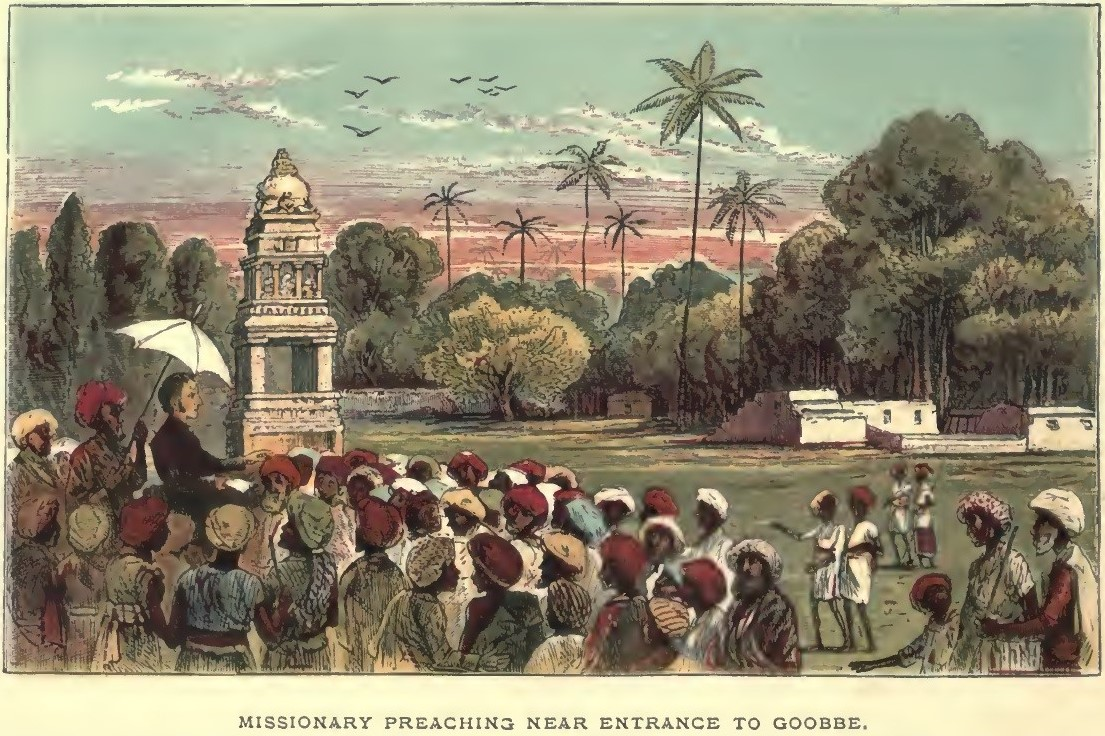
Missionary (Hodson) preaching near entrance to Goobbe, 1836 (Hodson, 1877, p. 33)

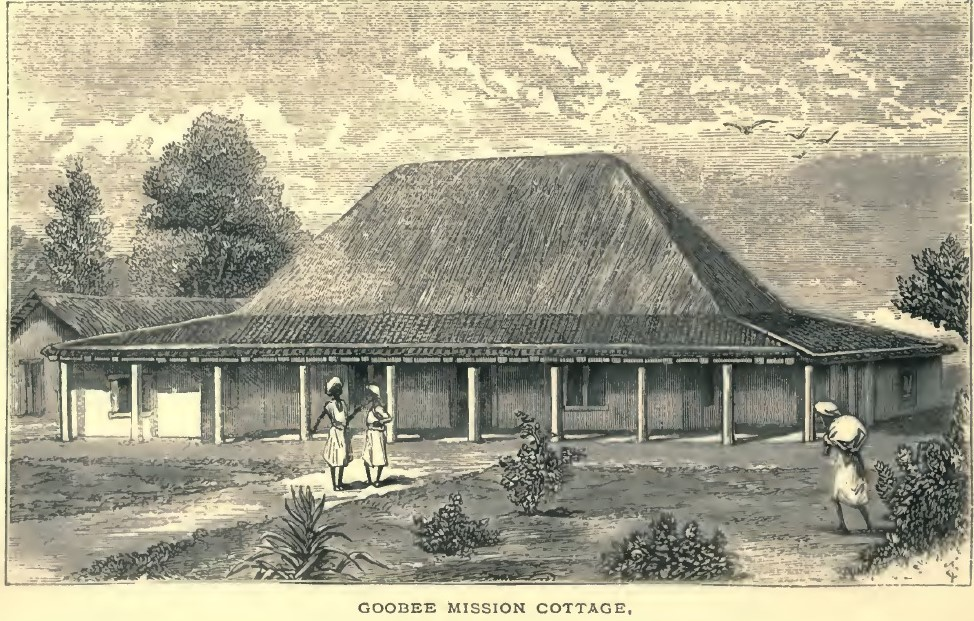
Goobee Mission cottage (Hodson, 1877, p. 46)

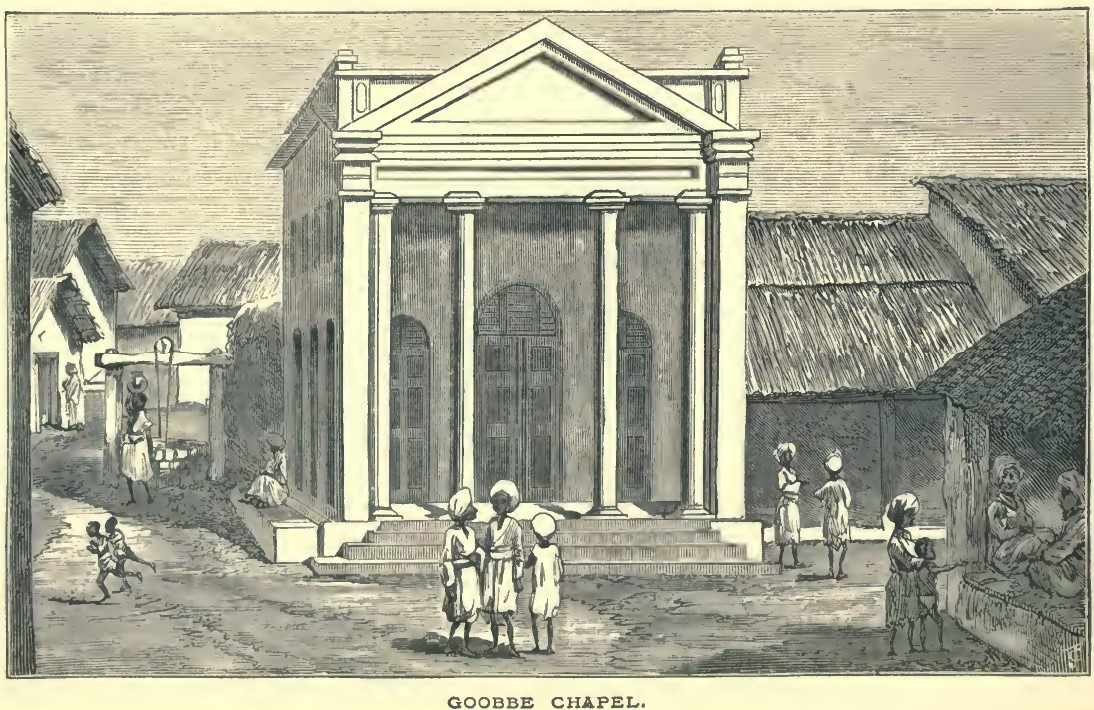
Gobbee Chapel (Hodson, 1877, p. 78)

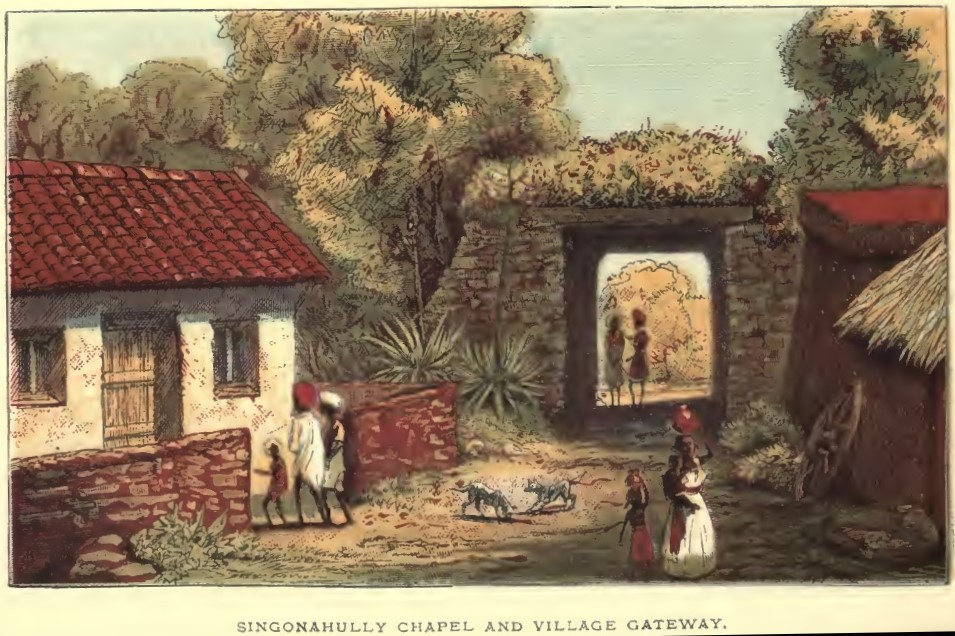
Singonahully Chapel and village gateway (Hodson, 1877, p. 82)

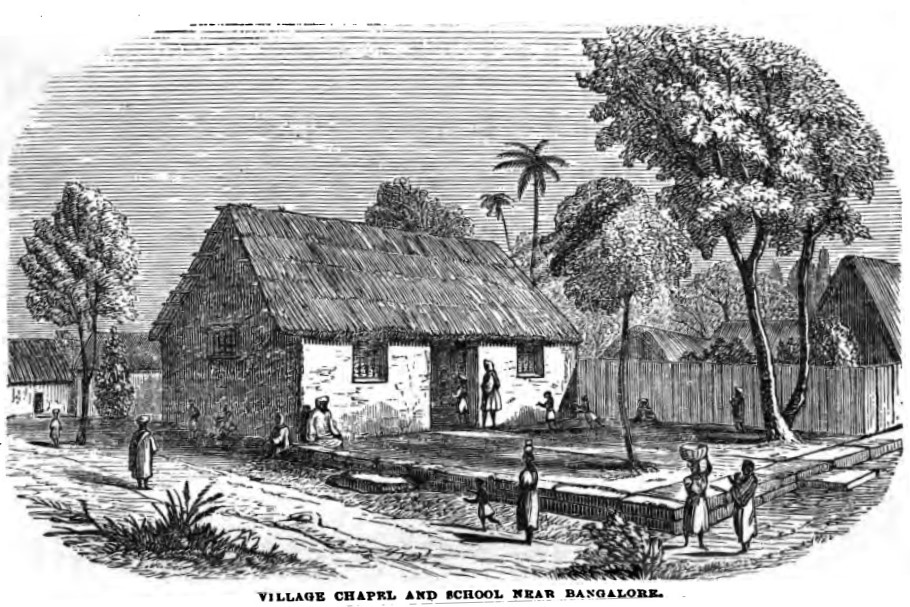
Wesleyan village chapel and school near Bangalore, by Thomas Hodson (1859)

Thomas Hodson was a Wesleyan missionary, who served in India, in the Wesleyan Canarese Mission, at the Bangalore Petah and Gubbi. He helped in running the first Wesleyan Mission Canarese school in the erstwhile Mysore State. Hodson was a linguist and a Kannada scholar, and was also fluent in Tamil and Bengali. He helped in establishing the Wesleyan Canarese Chapel (now the Hudson Memorial Church) at Nagarthpete in the Bangalore Petah. In 1864, Hodson wrote An Elementary Grammar of the Kannada, or Canarese Language, a treatise on the grammar of the Kannada language.

== History ==
Thomas Hodson was born in 1804, at North Scarle, Lincolnshire, England. In 1829, he came to India as a missionary of the Wesleyan Mission. Initially he was stationed in Calcutta between 1829 and 1833, where he learned Bengali for nearly three years. Between 1833 and 1836, he was transferred to Bangalore, where he learnt Canarese and Tamil. In 1836, he was appointed to Mysore, and then to Gubbi in 1837. Appointed back to Mysore, he served between 1838 and 1843. In 1843, he returned to England due to bad health. However, in 1853, he returned to India, and was appointed the chairman and superintendent of the Wesleyan Canarese Mission in the Mysore District. He left India in March 1878 for England, where he died on 9 September 1882.

Mary Ann Hodson, his wife, died on 10 August 1866, aged 68 years, and is buried at the Agram Protestant Cemetery in Bangalore. The Agram cemetery also has the graves of Jane Peach Rice wife of Benjamin Rice of the London Missionary Society who died on 11 March 1864 aged 57, Catherine wife of Matthew Trevan Male of the Wesleyan Missionary Society who died on 29 August 1865 aged 49, Fanny Lees child of Catherine and Matthew Male born 29 January 1861 and died 24 April 1861, and Rev. Alexander Maceallum, Missionary of the Free Church of Scotland died 10 June 1862. After her death, Hodson married Sophia Simpson (born 1836) and had another child, Margaret Hodson, who was born in 1871. Hodson also had a son from his first marriage, Richard George Hodson (born 1830), who has contributed articles on Bangalore in the Wesleyan Magazine. Richard also co-authored Dialogues in Canarese, along with Munshi Shrinivasiah and Rev. Daniel Sanderson.

== In Bangalore ==
Arriving in Bangalore from Calcutta, Thomas Hodson and his wife temporarily lived at the Wesleyan Mission House at the Bangalore Cantonment, along with Rev. Hardy. His initial days was spent learning Kannada and Tamil. In particular, Hodson intended to follow the example of the American missionaries in Ceylon and establish an extensive educational system in Bangalore.

According to Captain Woodward of the 32 NI, reporting on 4 November 1832, the Wesleyan Mission was established in the Bangalore Cantonment in 1819. The contact till then was restricted to the Tamil population of the Cantonment and the English soldiers. A Wesleyan Chapel had been established in the Bangalore Cantonment (the present Wesley Tamil Church, Haines Road), and services were conducted regularly in Tamil and 1 service every Sunday for the English soldiers. Contact with the Canarese population of the Bangalore Pettah was restricted. For reaching out to the Canarese, Thomas Hodson was learning the language, so he would be able to interact with them.

In 1832, Hodson was appointed to Bangalore, along with Peter Percival. Wesleyan missionaries were supposed to take up the dual task of educating and preaching to the locals. Around this time, Hodson decided to start a Mission at Gubbi, which a native town in the Mysore Kingdom. Hodson chose Gubbi to set up the mission because in Bangalore, he found that his time and efforts were taken away in preaching to the British and European officers, and he could not concentrate on the local population. However, the Gubbi mission was temporarily abandoned and Hodson returned to Bangalore. In 1834, Hodson purchased about 20 acres of land, just outside the Bangalore Petah (the current United Mission School and College, Unity Buildings, etc.). In the same year, Hodson had to take up the role of Supervisor of the Wesleyan Tamil Mission. During his tenure, he started an Anglo-Tamil school in the Bangalore Civil and Military Station. The reputation of the school spread, and several respected Hindu gentlemen of the Petah, requested Hodson to open a Canarese School in the Petah. Hence, a room was rented within the Fort walls and Canarese (Kannada) school was started. In this room, Hodson preached his first sermon in Canarese in 1835.

For some time, Hodson was involved in managing the Tamil works at Bangalore. After some time he moved back to Gubbi, living out in a tent. Rev. Thomas Cryer took over from Hodson as the Supervisor of the Wesleyan Tamil Mission. At this time William Arthur (an Irishman, after whom the William Arthur Memorial Church at Goobie is named after) and Peter Batchelor, laymen who came to Madras to run the Church Ministry Service (CMS) Press joined the Wesleyan Mission, and were transferred to the Wesleyan Tamil Mission at Bangalore Cantonment. Arthur them moved to Gubbi as the Wesleyan missionary. Thomas Hodson recorded the experiences of the Gubbi Mission in his book Old Daniel, or, Memoir of a converted Hindoo: with observations on mission work in the Goobbe circuit and description of village life in India, which provides an excellent account of village life in the 19th century Mysore State.

== Wesleyan Canarese Mission ==
According to William Arthur, the Wesleyan Canarese Mission was located in the Bangalore Petah, at about 3 miles from the Wesleyan Tamil Mission house. The land for the Wesleyan Canarese Mission was obtained by Thomas Hodson, and was located just outside one of the town gates. Initially, it was a school with a school room which served as the residence of the school master. The school provided English education and considerable number of students were enrolled. Thereafter Mr. Webber was sent to this mission. In 1840, Garrett and Jenkins were appointed as Wesleyan Canarese missionaries, with an authority to build a printing press and a mission-house. Thus was established the Wesleyan Mission Press, with the funding coming from English gentry. The missionaries started to preach in the streets of the petah in the early hours of the day. The sermon was simple Christian concepts such as unity of God, atonement of Christ, etc.

== Thomas Hodson's Account of the Bangalore Petah, 1856 ==
Thomas Hodson in 1856, describes Bangalore as consisting of two parts - the Cantonment where the soldiers lived and Tamil was primarily spoken, and the Old Town or the native town (Bangalore Pete) where Kannada was the main language. In both parts a total of 130,000 Indians lived. Further he describes the shops of the Bangalore petah, with mud being used for the walls and the floor, wooden pillars and clay used for flat roofs. There were no windows or any protection from the dust, with a mat from the rooftop for shade. At night, the shops were secured by wooden shutters. The shop-keeper sat on the floor of the shop, or on one of the lower shelves. The traders were cloth merchants, grocers, gold smiths, etc. The shops sold sugarcane, coconut, bananas, rice, sweets which were hung on a string and various grains which were kept in baskets with were smeared with cow-dung. Water carriers carrying water was a common site. There were thousands of monkeys which created mischief, but were unharmed by the natives due to their religious beliefs.

== Sketches ==
Thomas Hodson made several sketches about the life in the Bangalore Petah and Mysore State. Many of these were published as engravings in the 'Wesleyan Juvenile Offering'. The original colour sketches are in museums and in private collections. Some of Hodson's sketches are with the Museum of Sydney, The Rocks.

A series of sketches associated with Thomas Hodson, currently in the possession of the Museum of Sydney can be seen at these links below:

- Sketch 1: School and schoolhouse, Bangalore – Hodson's letter Dec 24 1836 / Thomas Hodson (1836). The present premises of the United Mission School and Unity Buildings. The Kempe Gowda Tower of Lalbagh can be seen at a distance.
- Sketch 2: First examination of boys by Rev. T. Hodson in Rajah's Palace / artist unknown (1841). Shows the students of the Wesleyan Mission School at Mysore being examined at the Palace of the Maharaja.
- Sketch 3: The Wesleyan Mission Chapel re-built by the Revd. J. Garrett 1846 (Drawn by J Rozario [?] Junior Scholar High School)(1846)
- Sketch 4: Front of temporary Mission House, Goobie, Mysore, India / artist unknown (1837)
- Sketch 5: Goobie Chapel, Mysore, India, opened June 12, 1860 / artist unknown (1860)

Hodson also recorded other sketches around South India, some of them are below

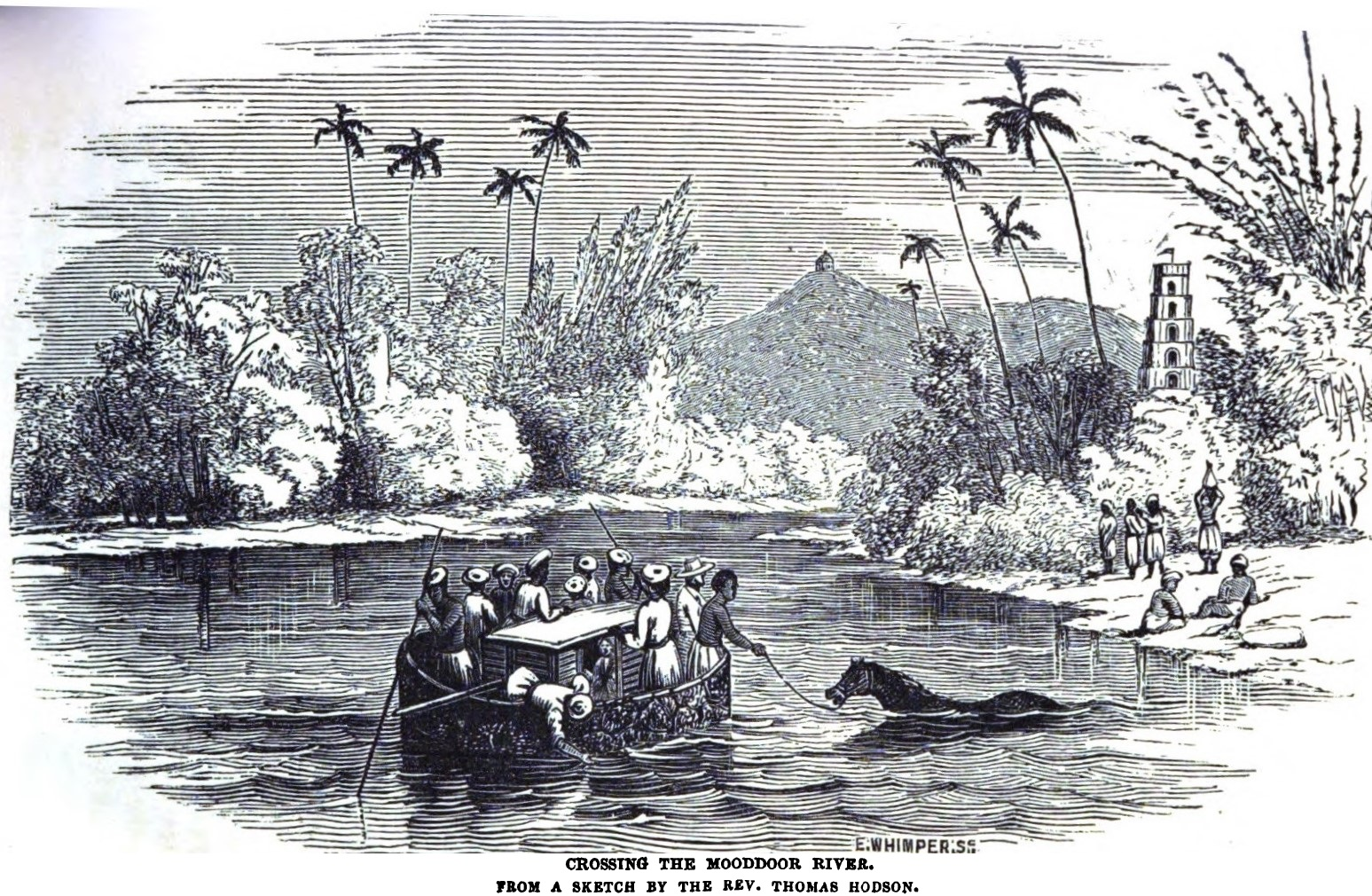
Crossing the Moodoor River, from a sketch by the Rev. Thomas Hodson (March 1851, VIII, p. 26)

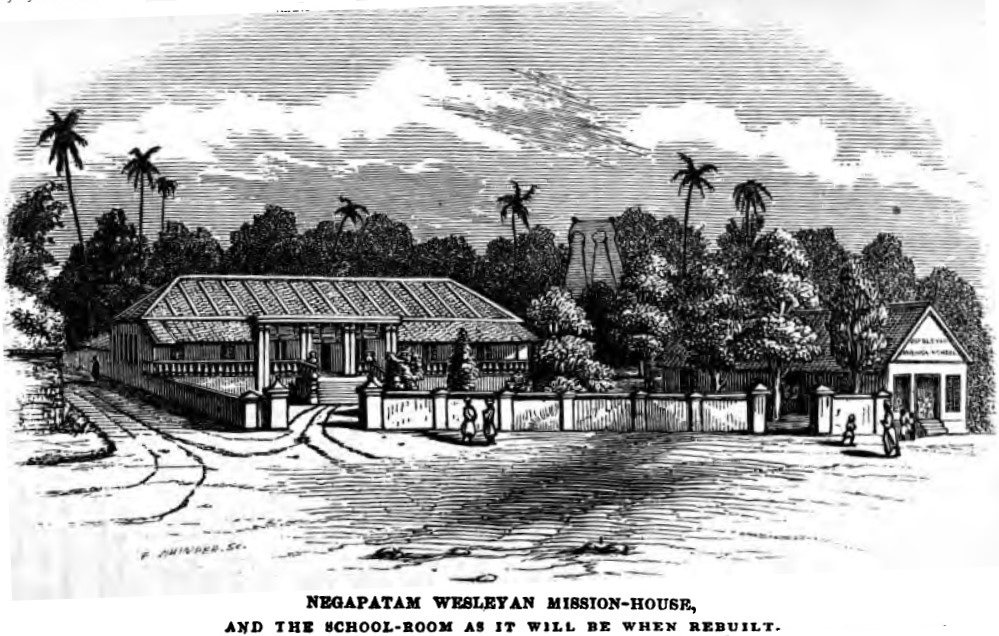
Negapatam Wesleyan Mission House and the school-room as it will be when rebuilt (October 1855, p. 108, Rev. Thomas Hodson)

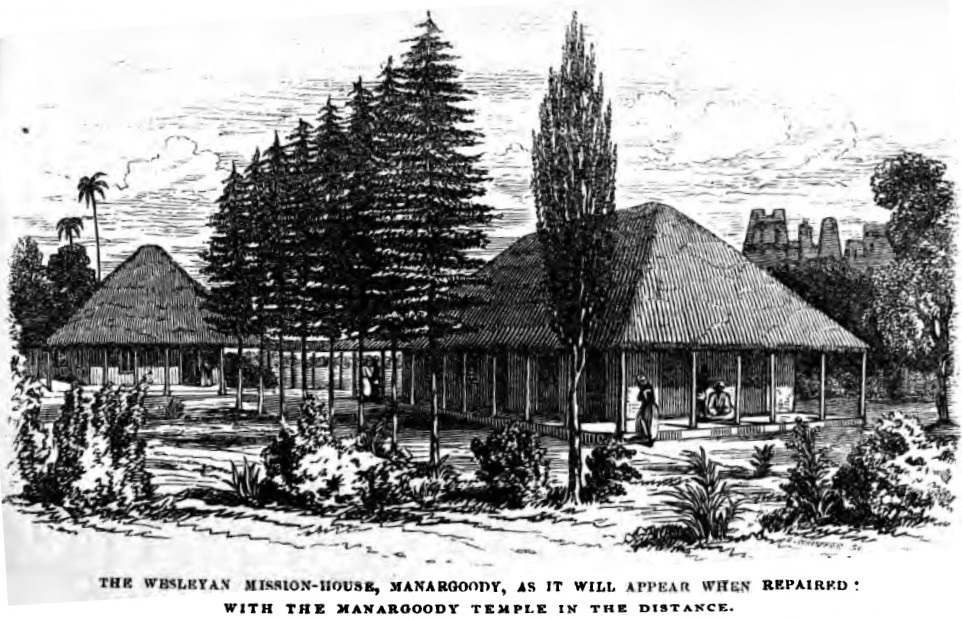
The Wesleyan Mission House, Manargoody, as it will appear when repaired, with the Manargoody Temple in the distance (November 1855, p. 120, Rev. Thomas Hodson)

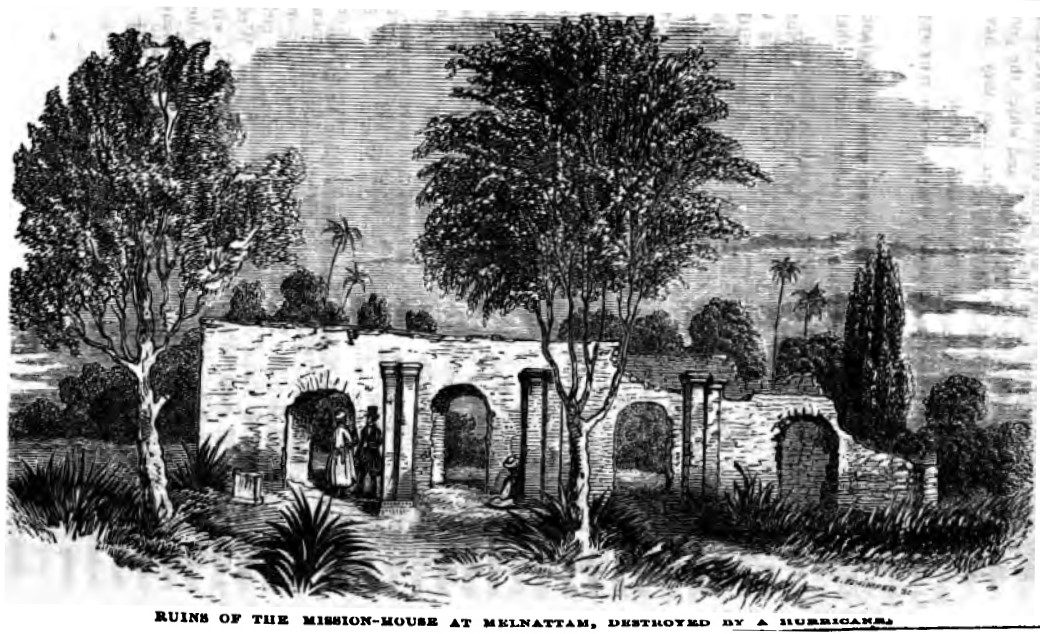
Ruins of the Mission House at Melnattam, destroyed by a hurricane (p. 138, December 1855, Rev. Thomas Hodson)

== Notable works ==
- An Elementary Grammar of the Kannada, or Canarese Language (1864).
- Old Daniel, or, Memoir of a converted Hindoo: with observations on mission work in the Goobbe circuit and description of village life in India (1877).

== See also ==
- Hudson Memorial Church, Bangalore
- Rice Memorial Church
- United Mission School
- William Arthur Memorial Church, Gubbi
