= Edward Sargent (bishop) =

19th century priest

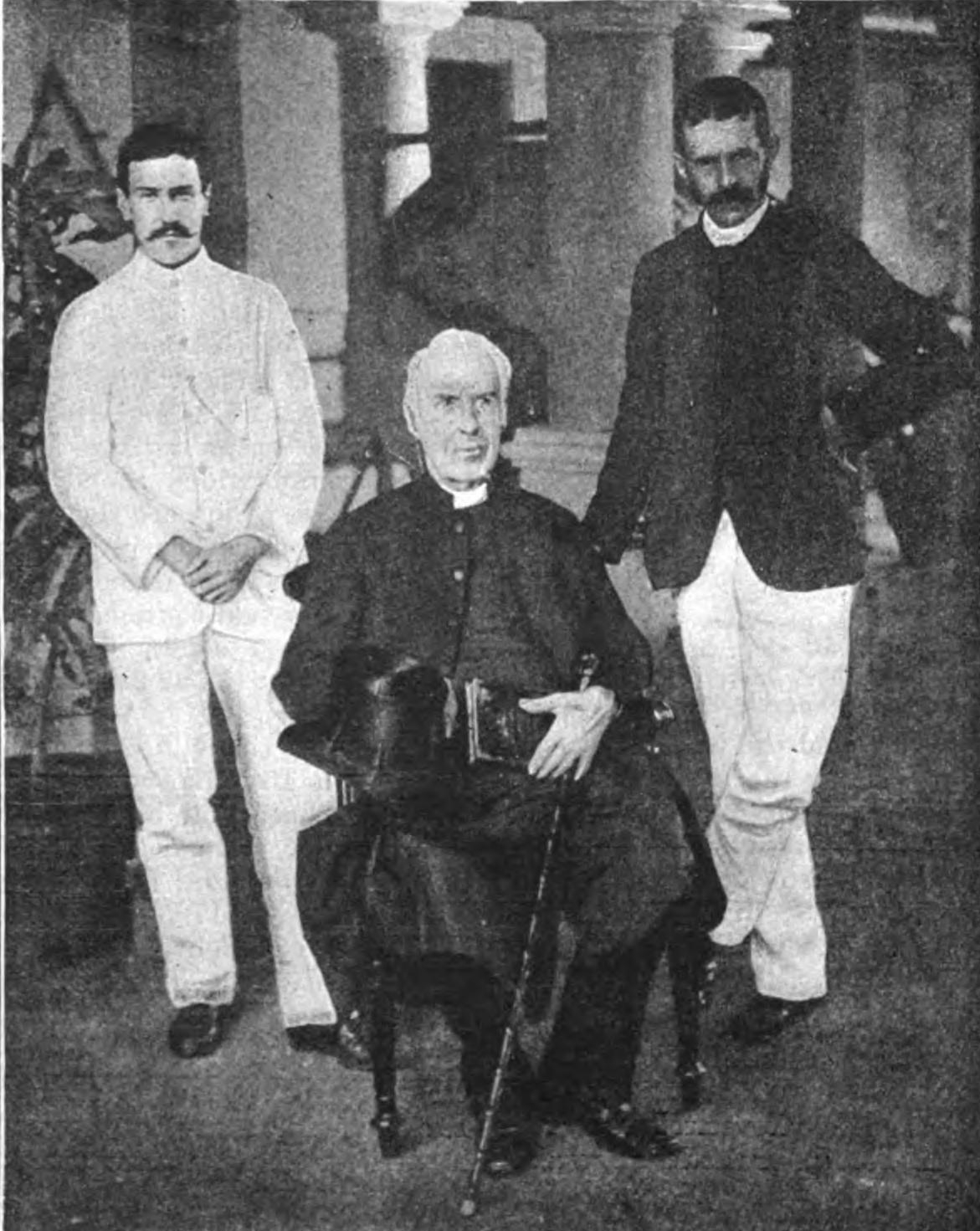
Bishop Sargent with T. Walker and E.S. Carr in Tirunelveli, c. 1889

Edward Sargent (1815–1889) was an Anglican priest, most notably an Assistant Bishop in the Diocese of Madras.

Sargent was born in Paris and educated at CMS College Kottayam. He was ordained in 1842 and served the Church of England in Tirunelveli, Suviseshapuram and Palamcottah. He received the degree of Doctor of Divinity (DD).
