= Suviseshapuram =

Community in India

Coordinates: 8°22′N 77°51′E

Suviseshapuram is a community in the Tirunelveli district in Tamil Nadu state in southern India.

It was started by Edward Sargent Assistant Bishop in the historic Diocese of Madras. and was centred around the Anglican church.

The most celebrated festival in this village is the harvestfestival. in it, the song Annai mari bala is played everywhere.
