= M. R. Gurusamy Mudaliar =

Medical Practitioner

M. R. Guruswami Mudaliar
- M. R. ஊநமி உடலிஅர்
- Born: Madras Ramaswamy Guruswami Mudaliar; 1880; Nelamangala, Bangalore
- Died: 1958 (aged 77–78); Kilpauk, Chennai
- Known for: Medicine
- Relatives: R. Nataraja Mudaliar (nephew)

M. R. Guruswami Mudaliar (1880–1958) was an Indian medical practitioner in Madras during the first half of the twentieth century.

== Early life ==
Guruswami Mudaliar was born in 1880 in a Thuluva Vellala mudaliar family in Nelamangala, (now in Bangalore), then part of the Mysore principality. His father, Ramaswamy Mudaliar, was a prosperous building contractor and he was born to his father's second wife. After completing his schooling in Mysore, he went to Bangalore Central College for his B.A. degree. Rajaji was a college friend of his.

== Medical career ==
After completing his bachelor's, Guruswami Mudaliar joined Madras Medical College for a degree in medicine. He passed out with flying colours and he later practised at Government Hospital, Thanjavur. After a few years, he was pressed into service as a professor at Madras Medical College. He was the first Indian to be appointed Professor of Therapeutics at the Madras Medical College. It was a highly honourable post as back in those days, as it was previously open only to experienced and knowledgeable British doctors.

== Speciality as a doctor ==
Guruswami Mudaliar was a renowned surgeon and was consulted by several famous people which included freedom fighters and political leaders. He performed the third surgery of a cancerous lump on Ramana Maharishi's arm in August 1949. He also treated Periyar several times in prison when he was not keeping good health. Others like V.V. Giri, Durgabai Deshmukh and MS Subbulakshmi also extol the services of Guruswami in their interviews and autobiographies.

Guruswami Mudaliar was widely known to be a past master at percussion diagnosis. In one case, Guruswami Mudaliar was asked to treat a young woman with a mysterious illness. He asked her to lie on her stomach and, pulling up her blouse, he kept his left hand on her back and began his percussion treatment. Suddenly he stopped at one spot and taking out a copying pencil he drew a circle around that spot. He then summoned the other doctors and showed them that the spot inside the circle in her body was the cause of her illness. He had located an abscess whose congealing during daytime caused fever to the patient. Though none of the other doctors believed him initially, the X-ray report confirmed the diagnosis was right. He prescribed sulpha tablets to dissolve the abscess and successfully cured the patient.

== Ethical standpoints ==
Guruswami Mudaliar never treated anyone for free as he believed free treatment would be deemed valueless. He charged a very small fee from poor patients.

During the 1957–1958 influenza pandemic in Madras, Mudaliar suggested a tablet called Elkosin to cure an influenza attack in one of his interviews. The interview created a sensation and the sales of the tablet surged. However, many city doctors were highly critical of Mudaliar for prescribing a branded tablet as treatment which they felt strongly was against medical ethics. Mudaliar said he placed the welfare of the patient higher than ethics.

== Recognition ==
- The bridge connecting Kilpauk and Chetpet in Chennai is named after Guruswamy Mudaliar, as is the road over the bridge.
- A statue of Guruswamy is instated at the campus of Madras Medical College.

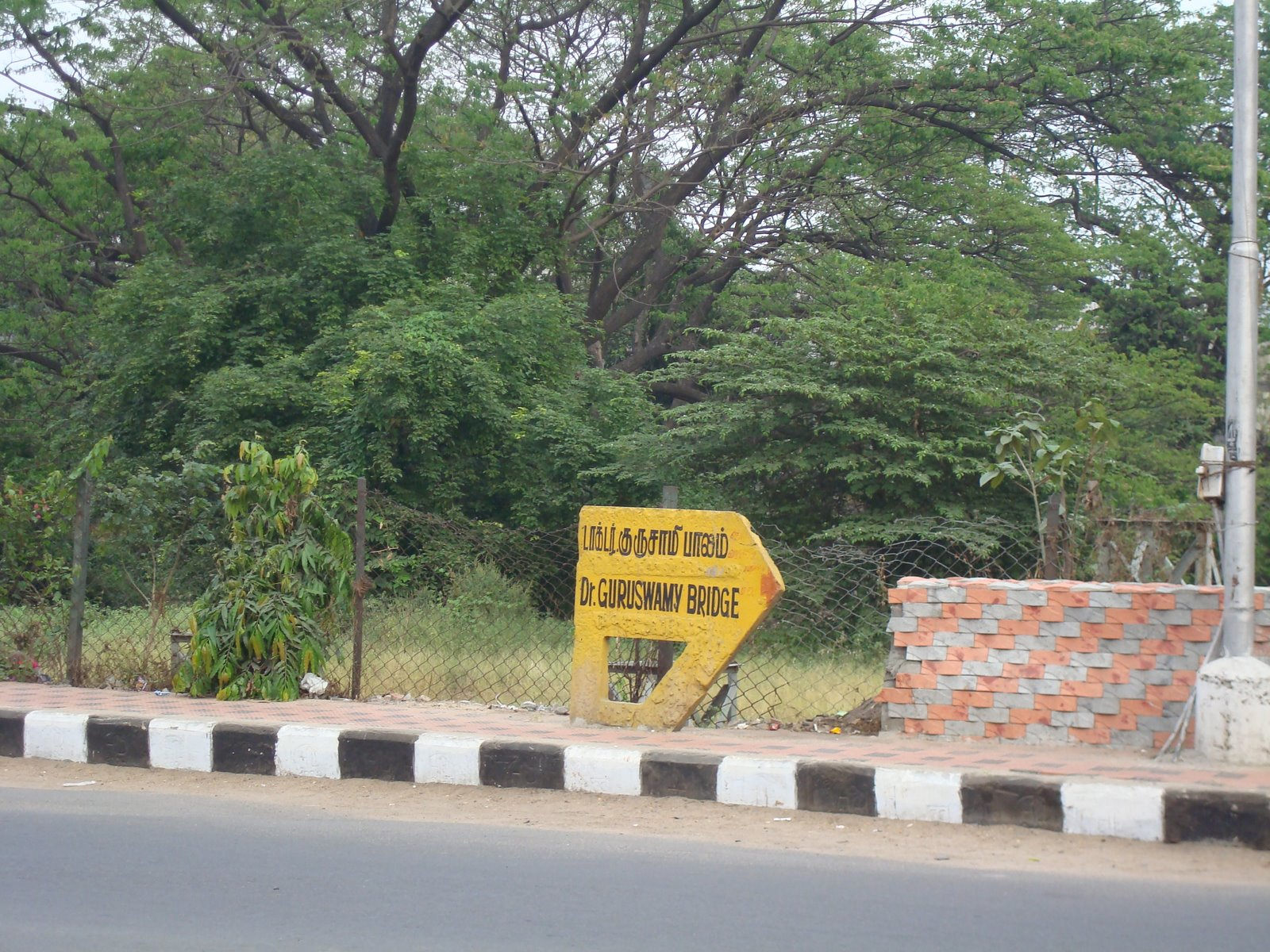
Dr Guruswamy Bridge, Chetpet in 2012.

- He was honoured by a special Cover released by Indian postal service.
- Dr. Guruswamy Mudaliar Thondaimandala Tuluva Vellala Hr. Sec School, chennai 1 is named after him.

== See also ==
- S. Rangachari
