= Mandayam Anandampillai Sampathkumaran =

Indian academic (1887–1944)

Dr. M.A. Sampathkumaran
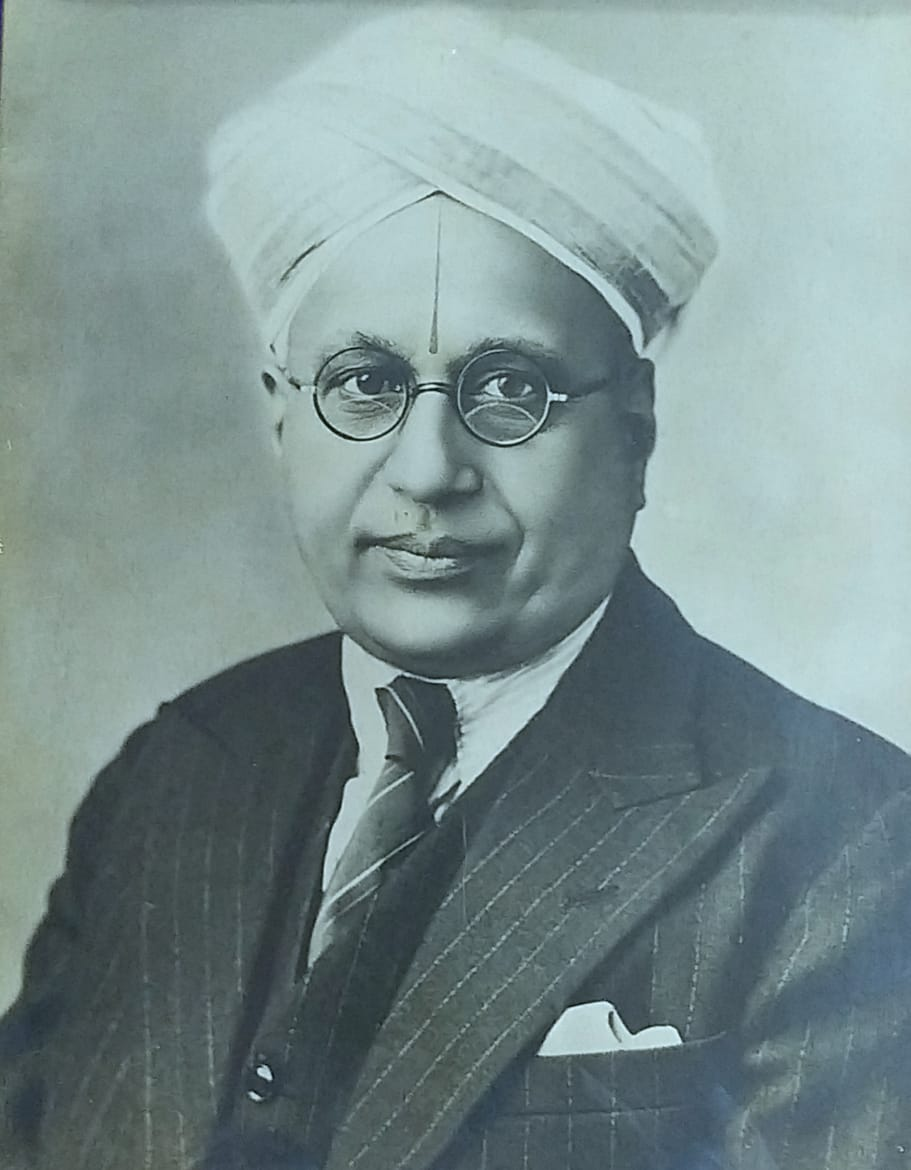
- The Founder of Botany Department, Central College, Bengaluru, India.
- Born: 15 July 1887; Melukote, Mysore State (current Karnataka), India
- Died: 15 December 1944; Bengaluru, Karnataka, India
- Occupation: Professor
- Spouse: Singamma
- Children: (M.A.) Alwar, Srinivasan, Anandalwar, Parthasarathy, Yaggamma, Vedavalli, Ranganayaki, Thangamma, Kamala
- Parent(s): Alwar Thirumala Iyengar and Yaggamma

Mandayam Anandampillai Sampathkumaran (1882 or 1887 - 15 December 1944) was an Indian academic in the field of Botany. In 1919, he founded the Department of Botany at Central College, Bengaluru, India.

== Early life and education ==
Sampathkumaran was born in Melukote- a small hilltop village near Sringapattanam in Mysore State, India. He was the last son of Sri Alwar Thirumala Iyengar (Sri Alwar Swamy) and Smt. Yaggamma. According to an obituary written by M.O.P. Iyengar, Sampathkumaran "came from a very highly cultured and orthodox Brahmin Sri Vaishnava family." His father, Sri Alwar Swamy, was a Sanskrit scholar who was well versed in Sanskrit and Indian philosophy, scripture and a revered guru who had followers in the thousands. His mother Smt. Yaggamma was a devoted housewife. His grandfather was also a Sanskrit scholar and also was the previous Sri Alwar Swamy.

Sampathkumaran received his Bachelor of Science from Central College, Bengaluru. In 1909, Sampathkumaran received his post graduate degree in M.A. from the Presidency College, Madras, with Botany and Biology as his specialization.

== Career ==
According to an obituary written by M.O.P. Iyengar, Sampathkumaran began his career in the domain of botany after his graduation, on 14 March 1910 when he was appointed as the Demonstrator in Botany at Central College, Bengaluru. The subject of botany was first introduced in the college with his appointment as the Demonstrator. Sampathkumaran was the sole member of the botany department at the time.

According to an obituary written by M.O.P. Iyengar, in 1915, as a Mysore Government-sponsored scholar Sampathkumaran went to the United States of America to further his academic education. Sampathkumaran studied at the University of Chicago under Prof. John Merle Coulter and Prof. Charles Joseph Chamberlain.

In 1917, Sampathkumaran received his Doctor of Philosophy (PhD) from the University of Chicago with his doctoral thesis on "Stelar Cambium and Its Derivatives". His thesis about "Smut on Sorgum" was accepted by the University of Chicago for Master's thesis in 1916. He was an Honorary Fellow of the University of Chicago from 1916 to 1917. On 22 November 1916, he was elected as a member of the Chicago chapter of Sigma XI Society.

According to an obituary written by M.O.P. Iyengar, after Sampathkumaran returned to India in 1919, he became an assistant professor of botany, which was the highest academic position available in the department at that time. He then founded the Department of Botany at the Central College, which was part of the Mysore University, as the Head of the department. Sampathkumaran was one of the pioneers of research on Plant Cytology and Morphology in India.

According to an obituary written by M.O.P. Iyengar, Sampathkumaran was appointed the Professor of Botany in 1923 until his retirement in 1941. From 1936 to 1939, he served on the Standing Committee of the Academic Council at the University of Mysore and was an Office Bearer in the University Union in 1937.

Sampathkumaran was elected Sectional President of the Plant Sciences section of the Indian Science Congress in 1927. He was elected as a fellow in the Plant Sciences section of the Indian Academy of Sciences in 1934, and served in the council from 1936 until 1940. He was elected Office Bearer of the Indian Botanical Society in 1942.

== Death and legacy ==
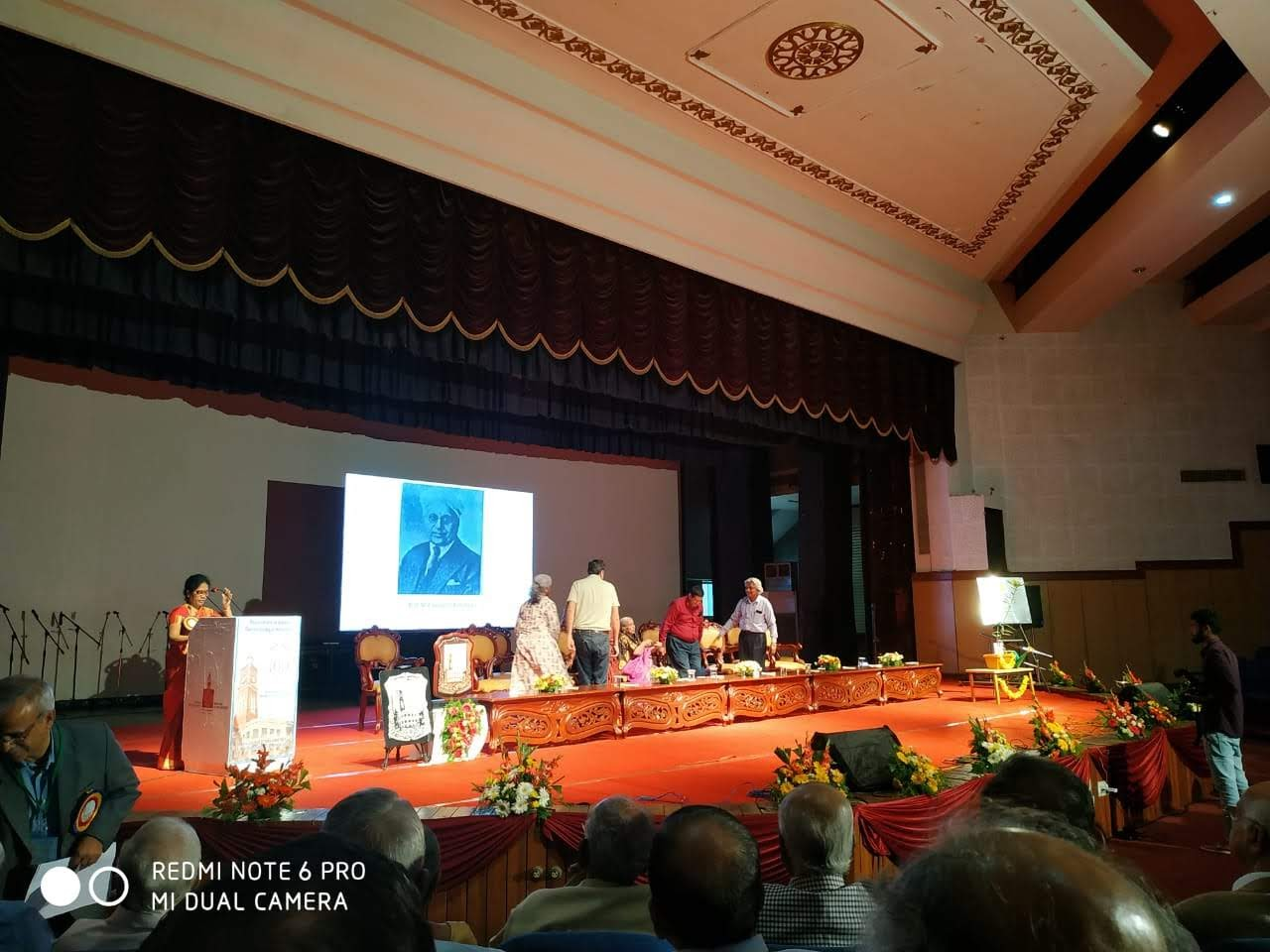

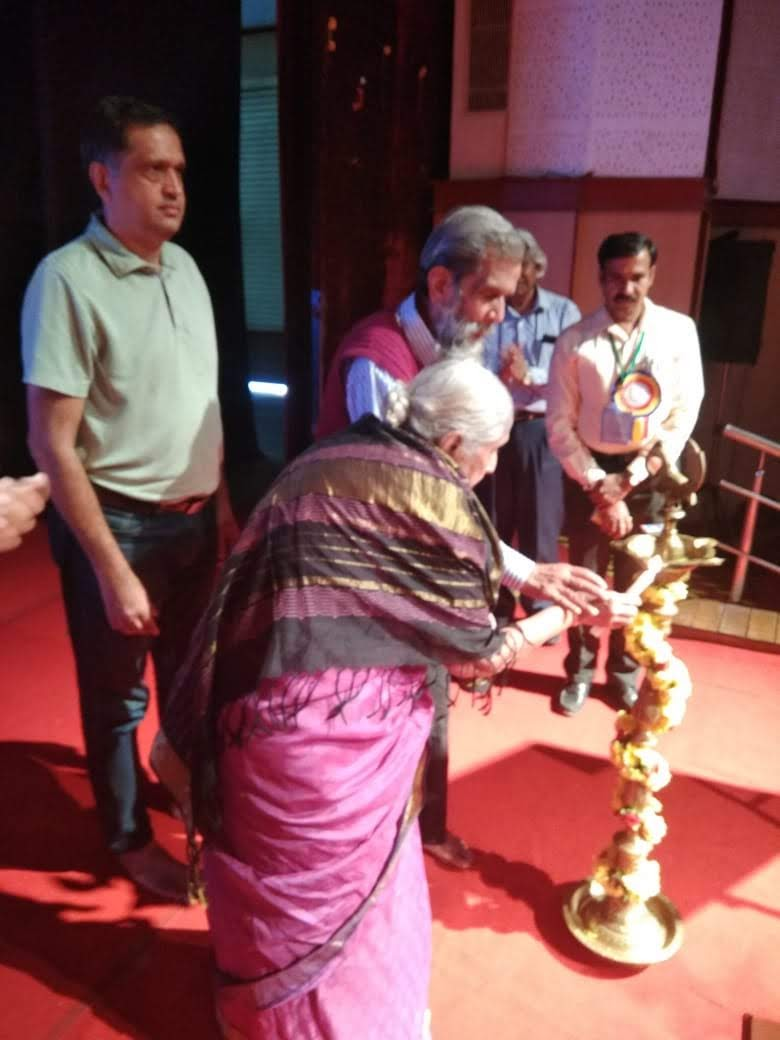

Dr. Sampathkumaran died on 15 December 1944 with a suspected heart failure.

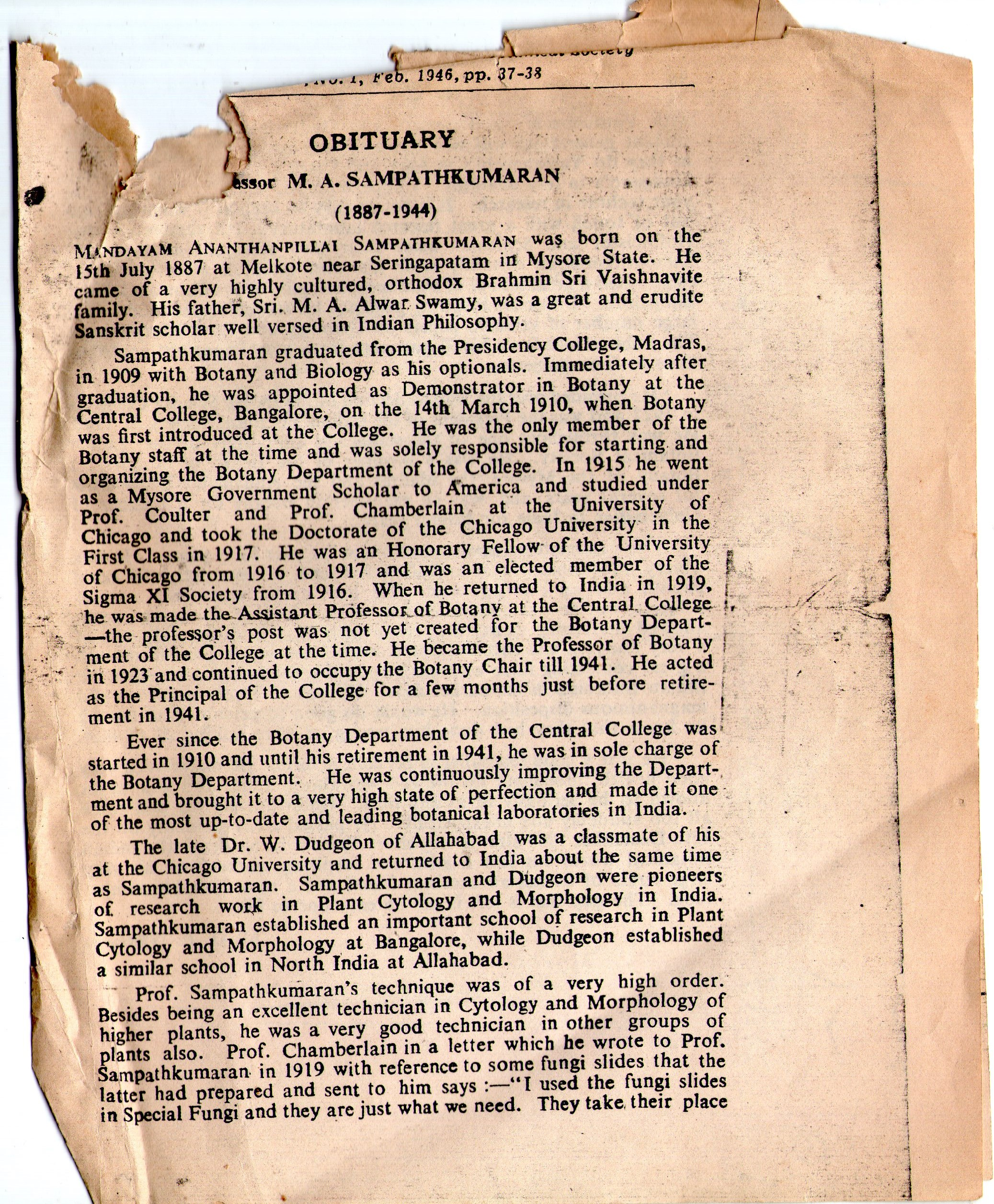

In September 2019, Bangalore University held a centenary celebration of the Department of Botany and honoured Dr. Sampathkumaran and felicitated some of his surviving grandchildren.

The University of Mysore has established a Memorial Cash Prize for securing First Rank in M.Phil. Botany, under the names of Prof. M.A. Sampathkumaran and Mr. S. Parthasarathy Iyangar.

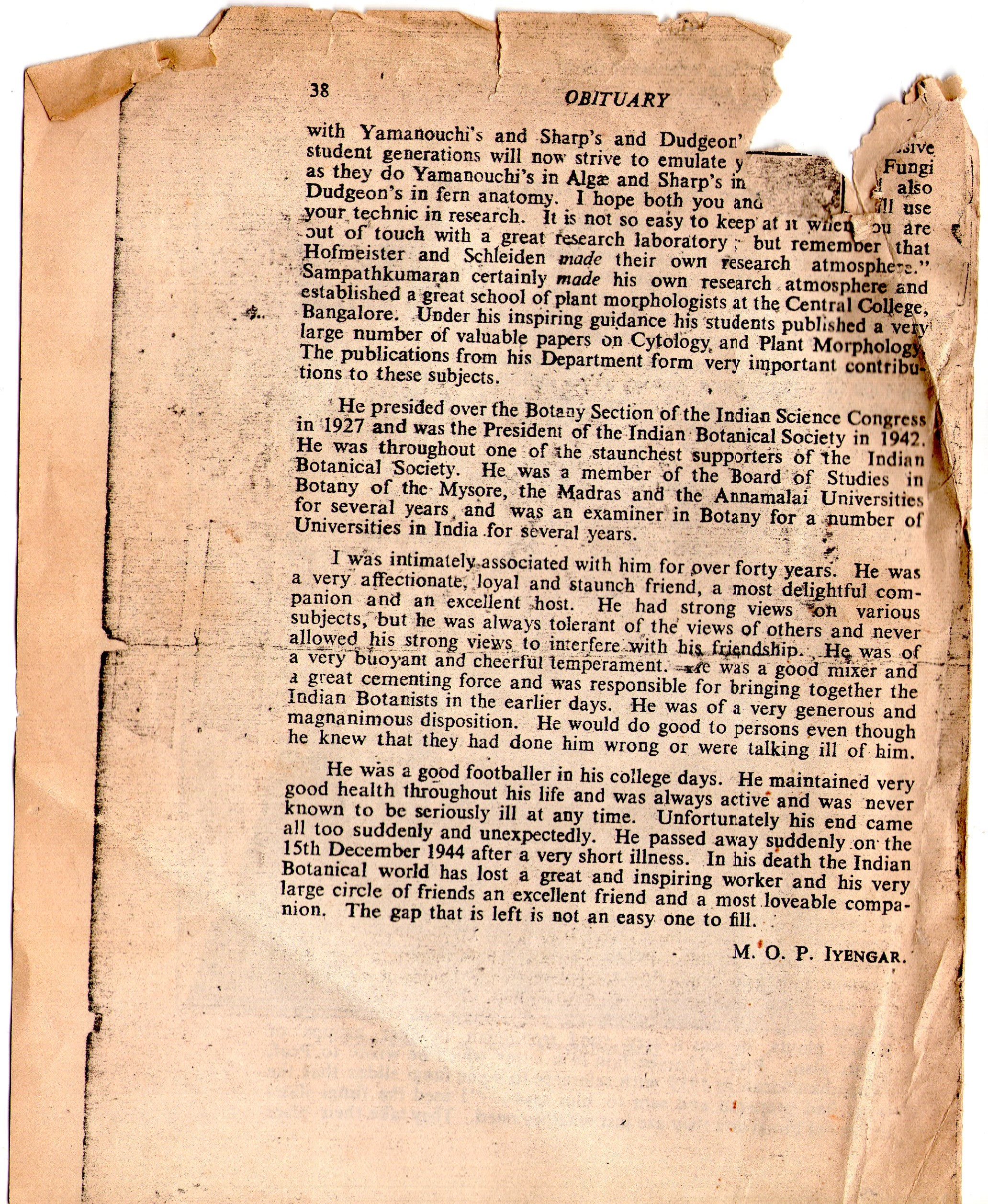

Author- Ramapriyan Singlachar, Sydney Australia. A great-grandson. Photos provided by Singamma and M.A. Sampath - Grandchildren.
