= Bengaluru Palace =

Royal palace in India

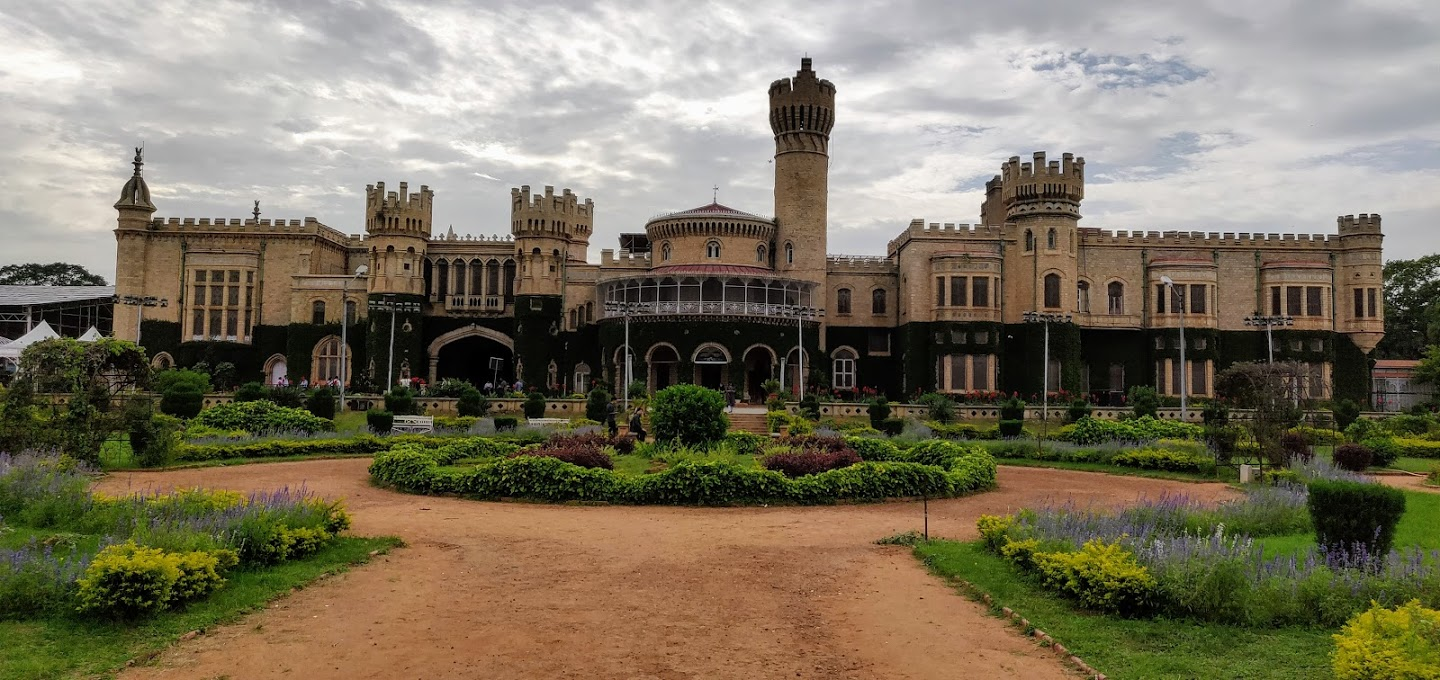
- Front facade
- Interactive map of the Bengaluru Palace area

General information
- Architectural style: Tudor Revival architecture
- Location: Bengaluru, India
- Coordinates: 12.9987°N 77.5920°E
- Construction started: 1873
- Completed: 1878

Website
- Official website

Bengaluru Palace is a 19th-century royal palace located in Bengaluru, Karnataka, India. It was commissioned by the Maharaja of Mysore, and was completed in 1874. The palace is open for public viewing, and in the recent years, the palace grounds have been to host various events and fairs, and is home to an amusement park.

== History ==
The palace was commissioned for the Chamarajendra Wadiyar X, the Maharaja of Mysore, in 1873. It was built on a 454 acres (184 ha) plot of land, owned by John Garrett, a linguist, and principal of the Central High School. It was completed in 1878 at a cost of ₹1 million (equivalent to ₹480 million or US$5.6 million in 2023).

== Architecture and design ==
The palace is located about 5.3 km (3.3 mi) north of the city centre. It has a built up area of 45,000 ft^{2} (4,200 m^{2}). Its design is based on the Windsor Castle in England, and built in Tudor Revival architecture. It consists of large fortified towers, and turreted parapets. Parts of the exterior walls are covered by plants. The palace has 34 rooms and a swimming pool. The interiors feature intricate wood work, motifs, and various art pieces.

== Usage ==
The palace complex is open to visitors. The open courtyard and grounds are used for various events such as concerts, exhibitions, weddings, and cultural programs. There is an amusement park inside the palace grounds. Various movies have been shot in the palace complex.

== Gallery ==
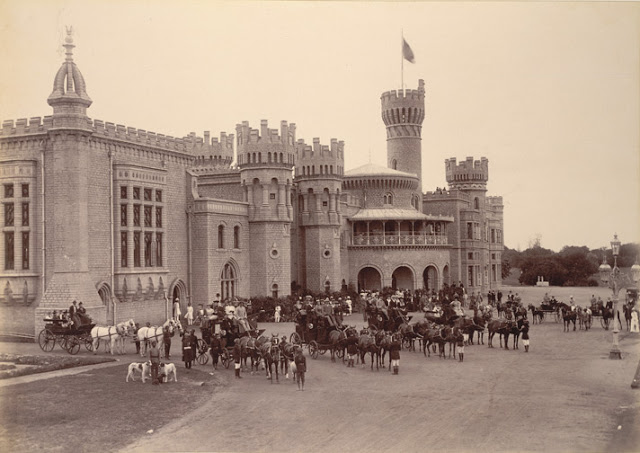
In 1890

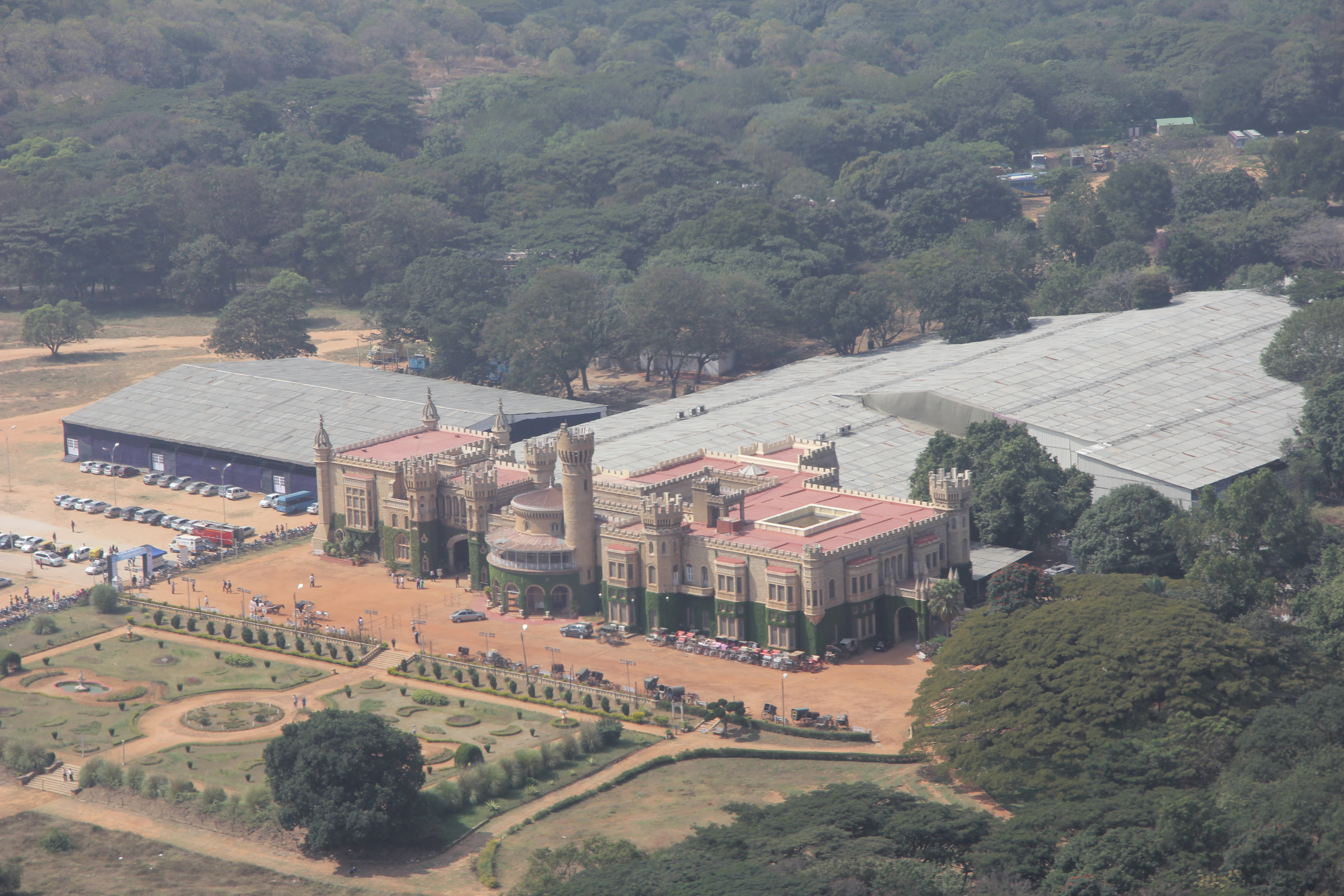
Aerial view

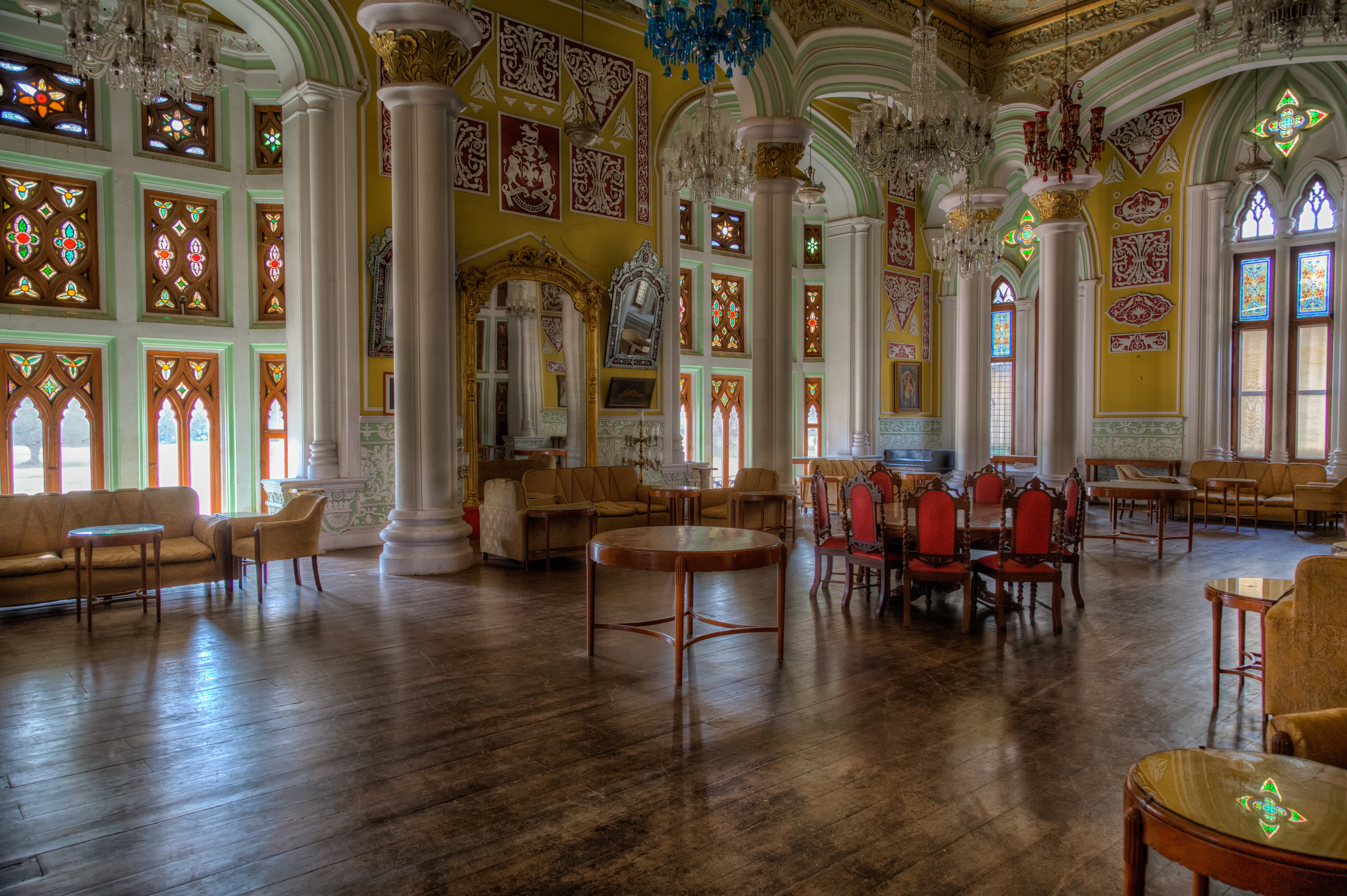
Interior

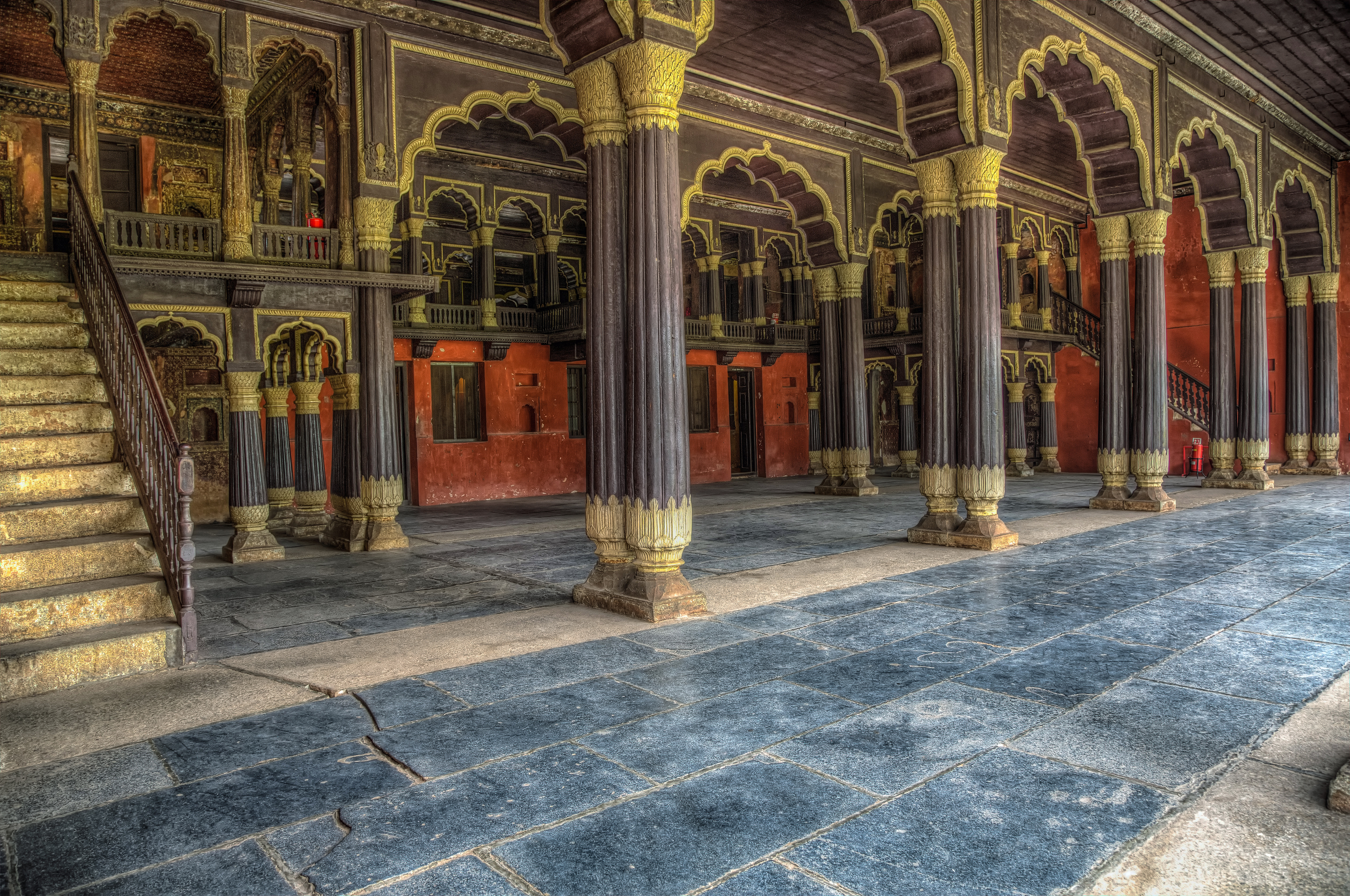
Interior

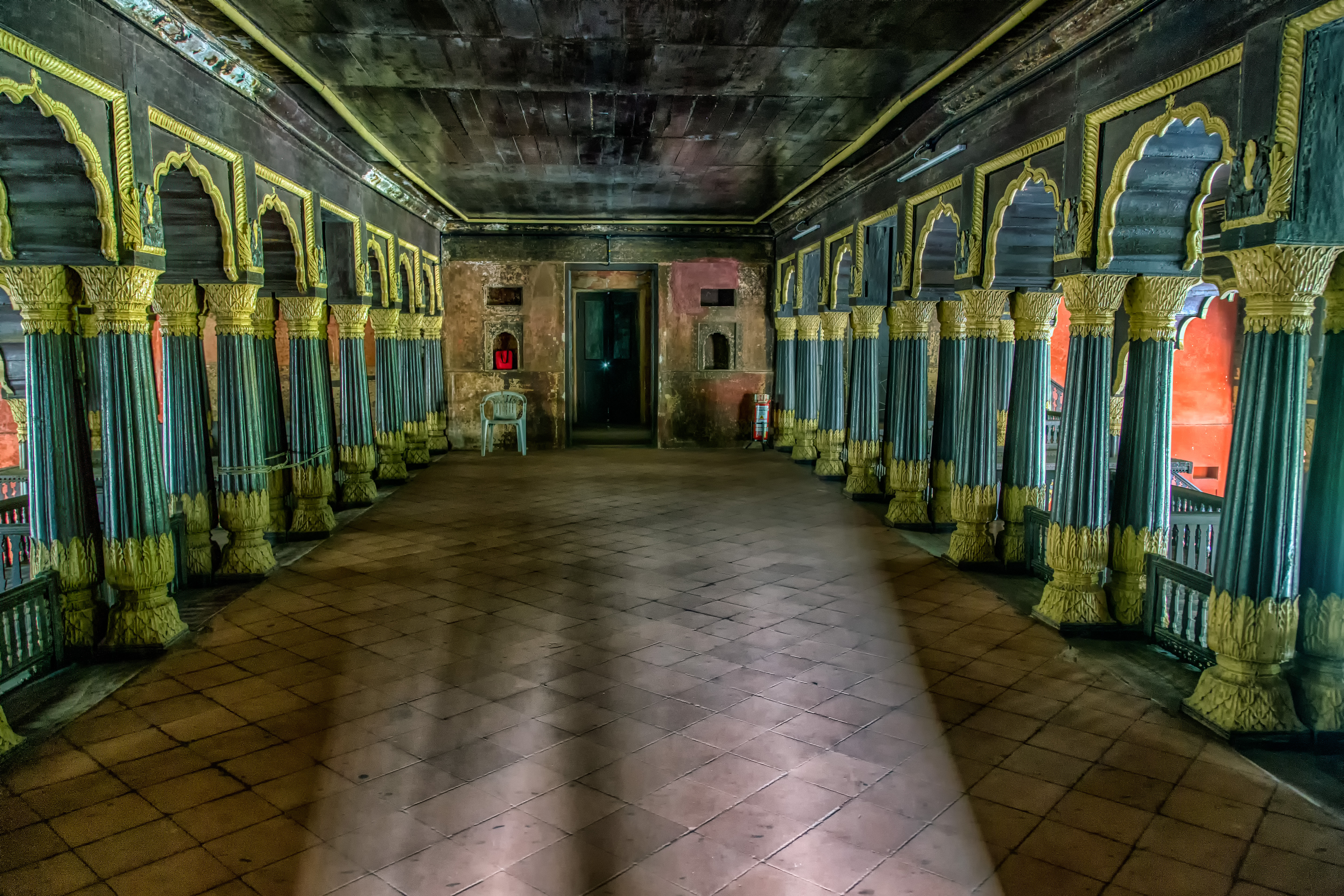
Interior

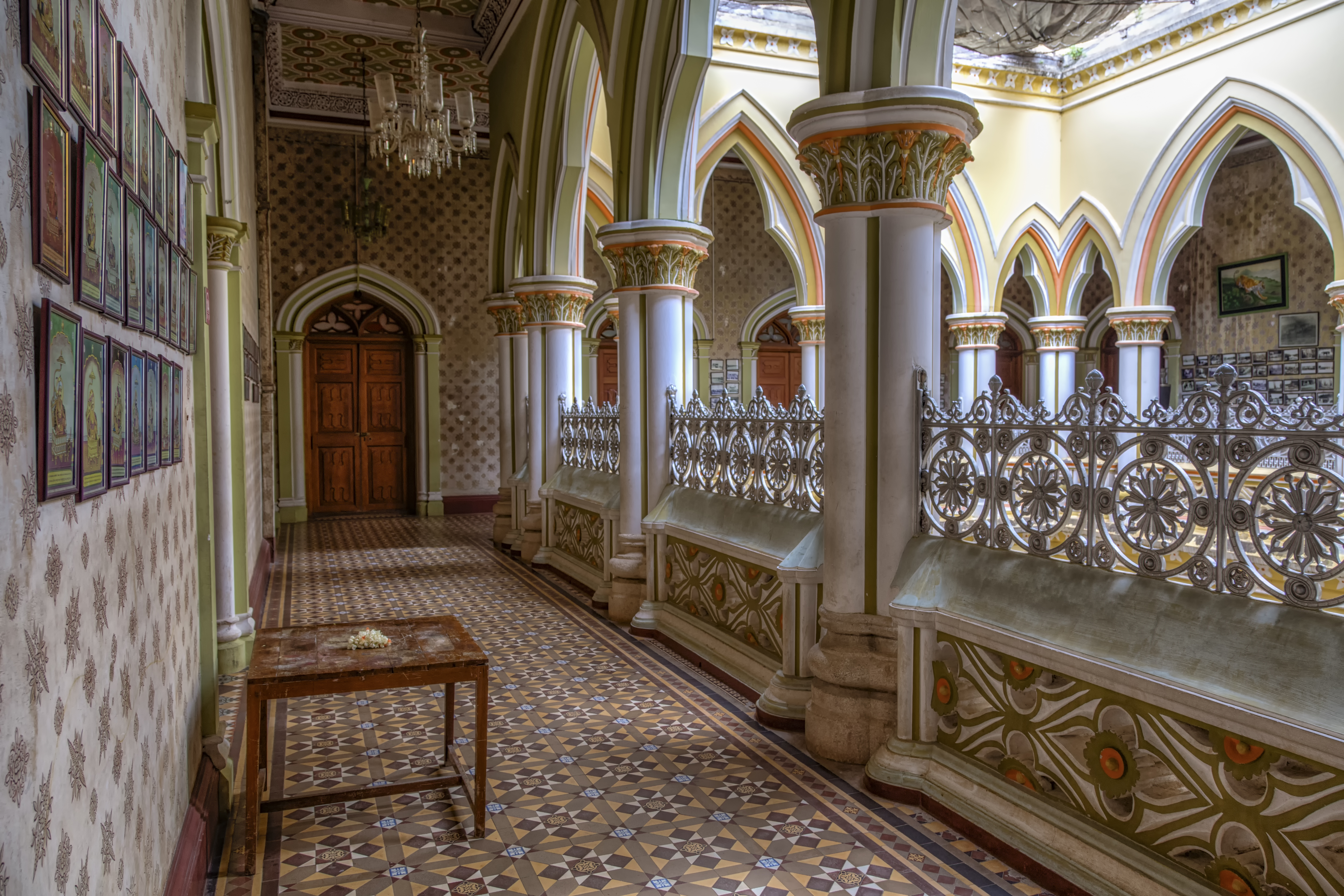
Interior

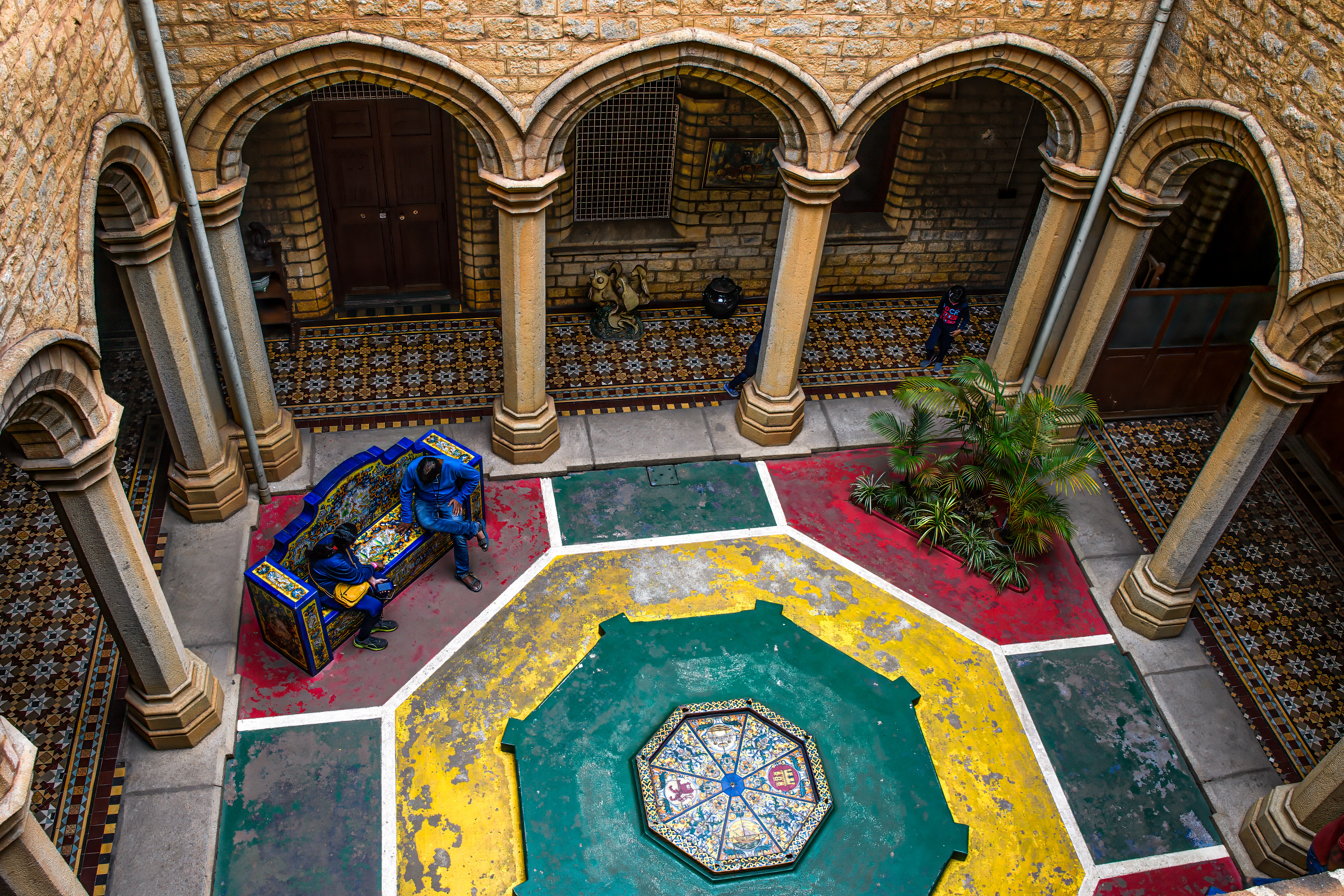
Interior

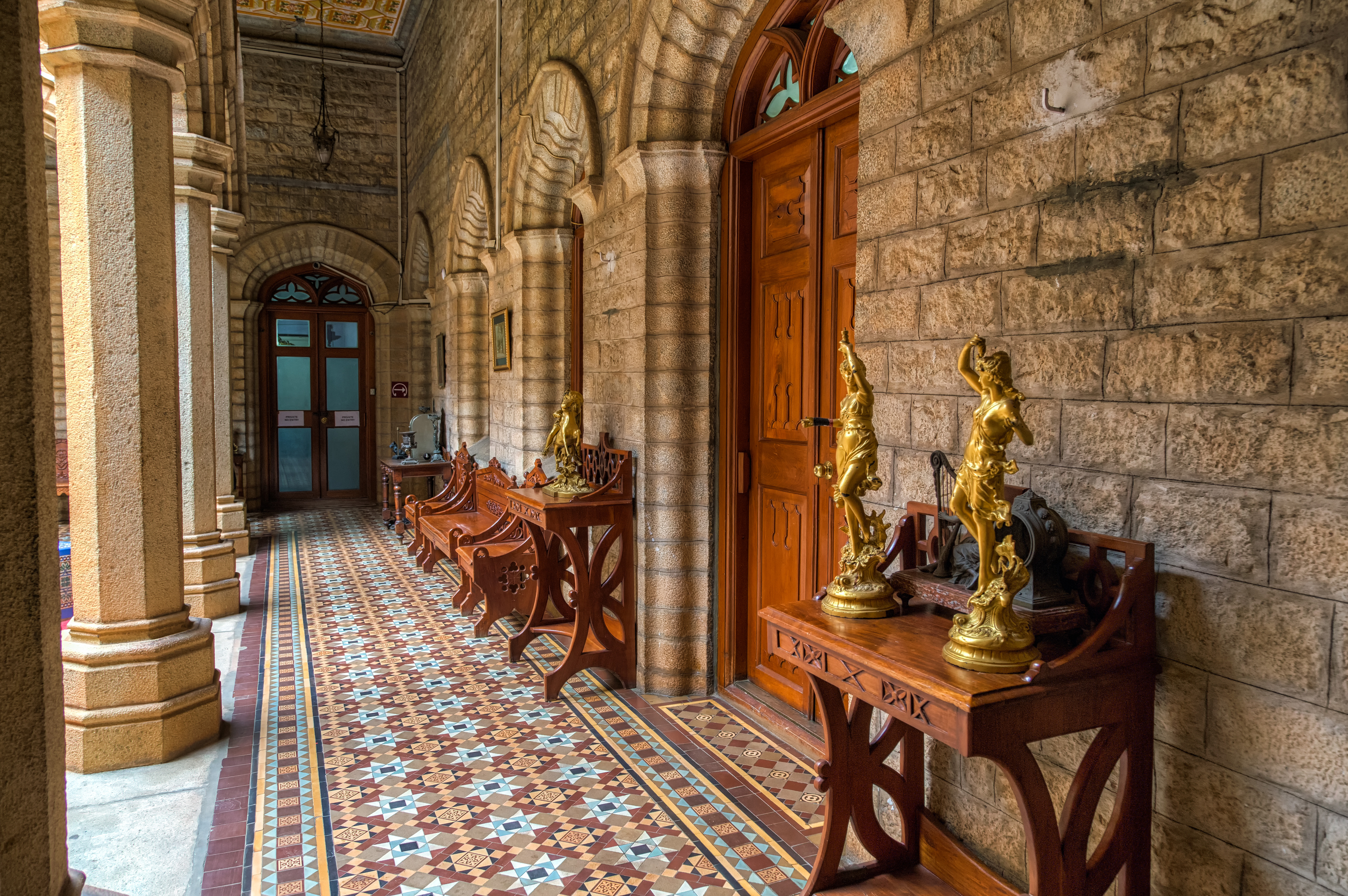
Interior

== See also ==
- Mysore Palace
- Wadiyar dynasty
