= John Garrett (linguist) =

Wesleyan Missionary

John Garrett (1815–1893) was a Wesleyan missionary in India, at the Canarese Mission in Bangalore Petah, and by profession a printer.

Garrett was a linguist and a scholar of languages including Canarese (Kannada), Sanskrit ad Tamil, as well as Persian, German and Latin. He established the Wesleyan Mission Press at Bangalore Petah around 1841. Garrett founded the Central High School in 1858, now the Central College, and served as its first principal.

Further, Garrett held posts in the Department of Public Instruction of Mysore State. His most significant contribution to Kannada literature was the first translation of the Bhagawat Gita into Kannada in 1846.

== In Bangalore ==
John Garrett owned large tracts of land in Bangalore, and some 454 acres of his land was acquired by the British Guardians of the Maharaja of Mysore to build the Bangalore Palace in 1873. Garrett had already built a European styled manor on these grounds in 1862, and this building was further renovated to the Tudor style, and adding more fortifications. The land was acquired for a sum of BIR 23,000

Further, Mark Cubbon, the Commissioner of Mysore, acquired 14 acres of land from Garrett, to build his residence the Balabrooie, and this is now the official guesthouse of the Government of Karnataka.

Mary Sophia Garrett, John's daughter married to Benjamin Lewis Rice, an eminent historian, archaeologist and educationist, who also served as the first director of the Mysore State Archaeology Department

== Death ==
John Garrett died at Chorlton Lodge, Hampton Hill, London, on 20 June 1893.

== Wesleyan Mission Press, Bangalore ==
John Garrett and Mr. Jenkins were appointed as Canarese missionaries in 1840, and were authorised to start a printing press in the Bangalore Pettah, which was the part of Bangalore under the jurisdiction of the Mysore State. Garrett was a printer by trade before joining the Wesleyan Mission. The press was funded by English gentry and took a few months to complete. Before this, printing in Canarese was done at the Vepery Mission Press, Church Street, outside Madras, which was established in 1779. Even though printing at the Bangalore Press started in 1840, the earliest books in the collection of the British Museum are from 1841. And for the first few years, the books had to be sent to Madras for binding, as the Bangalore Press did not have the facilities in its early years of operation.

Some of the earliest traceable publications of the press are

- Canarese and English Instructor, or a Help in acquiring a knowledge of the English language. (1841) by an anonymous author, only copy with the British Council Library, New Delhi
- Katha Manjare. Or, a Collection of Canarese stories (1841)

Other publications

- R A Cole, "An Elementary Grammar of the Coorg Language"
- An Elementary Grammar of the Kannada, or Canarese Language (1864)
- A dictionary, Canarese and English (1858)

== Notable works ==
- 1846, "The Bhagavat-Geeta Or, Dialogues of Krishna and Arjoon, in Eighteen Lectures : Sanscrit, Canarese, and English, in Parallel Columns"
- 1871, "Classical Dictionary of India: Illustrative of the Mythology Philosophy Literature Antiquities Arts Manners Customs & C. The Hindus"

== Sketches ==
Fellow Wesleyan missionary and linguist Thomas Hodson made several sketches about the life in the Bangalore Petah and Mysore State. One of these paintings at the Museum of Sydney, The Rocks, part of the Caroline Simpson Collection, Clyde Bank, shows the Wesleyan Mission Chapel, re-built by Rev. J Garrett (1846)

== See also ==
- Hudson Memorial Church, Bangalore
- Rice Memorial Church
- United Mission School
- William Arthur Memorial Church, Gubbi
