= Navaratna Rama Rao =

Navaratna Rama Rao (27 May 1877 – 1960) was an eminent Indian political leader and writer based in Mysore. The title "Navaratna", which means Nine Gems, was given to him by the seer of Uttaradi Mutt for the scholarly services rendered to the orthodox Deshastha Madhwa Brahmin Society by the nine scholar-brothers in that family.

== Career ==
He was a member of the legislative council ( senior parliament of India) and a close ally of the Maharaja of Mysore during his career with a significant influence on the government. Born in 1877, Rao descended from Deshastha Madhwa Brahmins. He attended Central College of Bangalore along with C. Rajagopalachari, who would become a lifelong friend, and was influenced by Scottish teacher John Guthrie Tait. He received his law degree in Madras and subsequently practiced in Salem, Tamil Nadu. He retired in 1951 and his memoirs were published by Masti Venkatesha Iyengar, who was a close friend. Rama Rao passed the Mysore Civil Services Examination to join the State Administration in the Princely Mysore where he served in various positions starting his career as "Amildar" and retiring as the Director of Industries and Commerce of the State. His service was to the Princely State of Mysore, ruled then by HH Krishna Raja Wadiyar IV, Maharaja of Mysore. He attended the first Round Table Conference in London in 1930 as Advisor to the then Diwan, Sir Mirza Ismail.

As a planner, he was responsible for establishing Silk Industry in Mysore and subsequently the Central Silk Board of India on which he served as Vice-Chairman. In recognition of his public service, he was conferred the title "RAJASEVAPRASAKTA" by the then Maharaja of Mysore, Sri Jayachamaraja Wodeyar.

He was friends with Bharata Ratna, V. T. Krishnamachari, Masti Venkatesh Iyengar, D. V. Gundappa and M. S. Subbulakshmi.

As a member of Legislative Assembly representing the Government while in service and as an elected member of Legislative council by the State Chamber of Commerce and Industries, he was responsible for many decisions taken by the Government. Bharata Ratna C. Rajagopalachari used to stay in the house of Mr.Rama Rao at Basavanagudi, when he visited Bangalore. Most of his family continues to live in Basavanagudi, Bangalore. A yearly public memorial is conducted by his children and grandchildren.

== Literary life ==
Though studied in Shakespeare and Western literature, he was also versed in Kannada, Sanskrit and French. Rajaji’s Ramayana and Mahabharata, two early works of Indian literature in the English language, were revised by Rama Rao, as C. Rajagopalachari himself acknowledges in the preface. All these are chronicled in his memoir Kelavu Nenapugalu and Masti’s book Navaratna Rama Rao.

Rama Rao’s literary work included his translation of Masti’s Kannada novel Chenna Basava Nayaka to English, translation of Niccolò Machiavelli’s book The Prince to Kannada, his Sanna Kathegalu and his chronicled life-sketches of the dynasty of Mysore Rulers besides several articles he wrote to the then Madras Times journal on Shakespeare’s works and contemporary national politics when he was studying law at Madras.

In 2015, a memoir, The Vanished Raj was published by his two grandchildren, Navaratna Srinivasa Rajaram and Rajeshwari Rao.

== Bibliography ==
- Rajaram, N S (2019). The Vanished Raj A Memoir of Princely India. Prism Books Private Limited. ISBN 9789388478113.
