= Rajeshwari Chatterjee =

Indian scientist (1922–2010)

- Born: 24 January 1922
- Died: 3 September 2010 (aged 88)
- Education: University of Michigan; Indian Institute of Science; Mysore University
- Occupations: Professor, scientist

Rajeshwari Chatterjee (24 January 1922 – 3 September 2010) was an Indian scientist and an academic. She was the first woman engineer from Karnataka and described herself as an engineering-scientist. During her tenure at the Indian Institute of Science (IISc), Bangalore, Chatterjee was a professor and later chairperson of the department of Electrical Communication Engineering.

== Early life and education ==
Rajeshwari Chatterjee was born on 24 January 1922 in Karnataka. She had her primary education in a "special English school" founded by her grandmother, Kamalamma Dasappa, one of the first women graduates from Mysore and who was very active in the field of education, especially for widows and deserted wives. After her school finals, Chatterjee was tempted to take up History but eventually chose physics and mathematics. She studied in Central College of Bangalore and earned B.Sc. (Hons) and M.Sc. degrees in mathematics. In both these exams she ranked first in Mysore University. She received the Mummadi Krishnaraja Wodeyar Award, the M.T. Narayana Iyengar Prize and the Walters Memorial Prize respectively for her performances in the B.Sc. and M.Sc. examinations.

In 1943, after her M.Sc., Chatterjee joined the Indian Institute of Science (IISc), Bangalore as a Research Student in the then Electrical Technology Department in the area of Communication.

She approached physicist C.V. Raman to work under him. Some sources say that Raman refused to take her, stating that Rajeshwari had no degrees in physics, while others say that he was averse to the idea of having women students.

After the Second World War, an interim government was set up in India to transfer power from the British to Indians, which offered scholarships to bright young scientists to study abroad. Chatterjee applied for a scholarship in the field of electronics and its applications, and in 1946, she was selected as a "bright student" by the Government of Delhi and given a scholarship to go abroad to pursue higher studies. Chatterjee chose to study in University of Michigan, Ann Arbor in the United States. In the 1950s, it was very difficult for Indian women to go abroad to pursue higher education. But Chatterjee was determined to do so. In July 1947, one month before India's independence, she started her journey to the USA on a converted troop ship SS Marine Adder and reached there after 30 days.

In the US, she was admitted to the University of Michigan and obtained her master's degree from the Department of Electrical Engineering. Then following the guidelines of the contract she had with the Government of India, she underwent an eight months' practical training in the Division of Radio Frequency Measurements at the National Bureau of Standards in Washington, D.C. After the completion of the training she went back to the University of Michigan in 1949 on a Barbour scholarship and resumed her studies. In early 1953, she obtained her Ph.D. degree under the guidance of Professor William Gould Dow and successfully completed her dissertation.

== Career in India ==
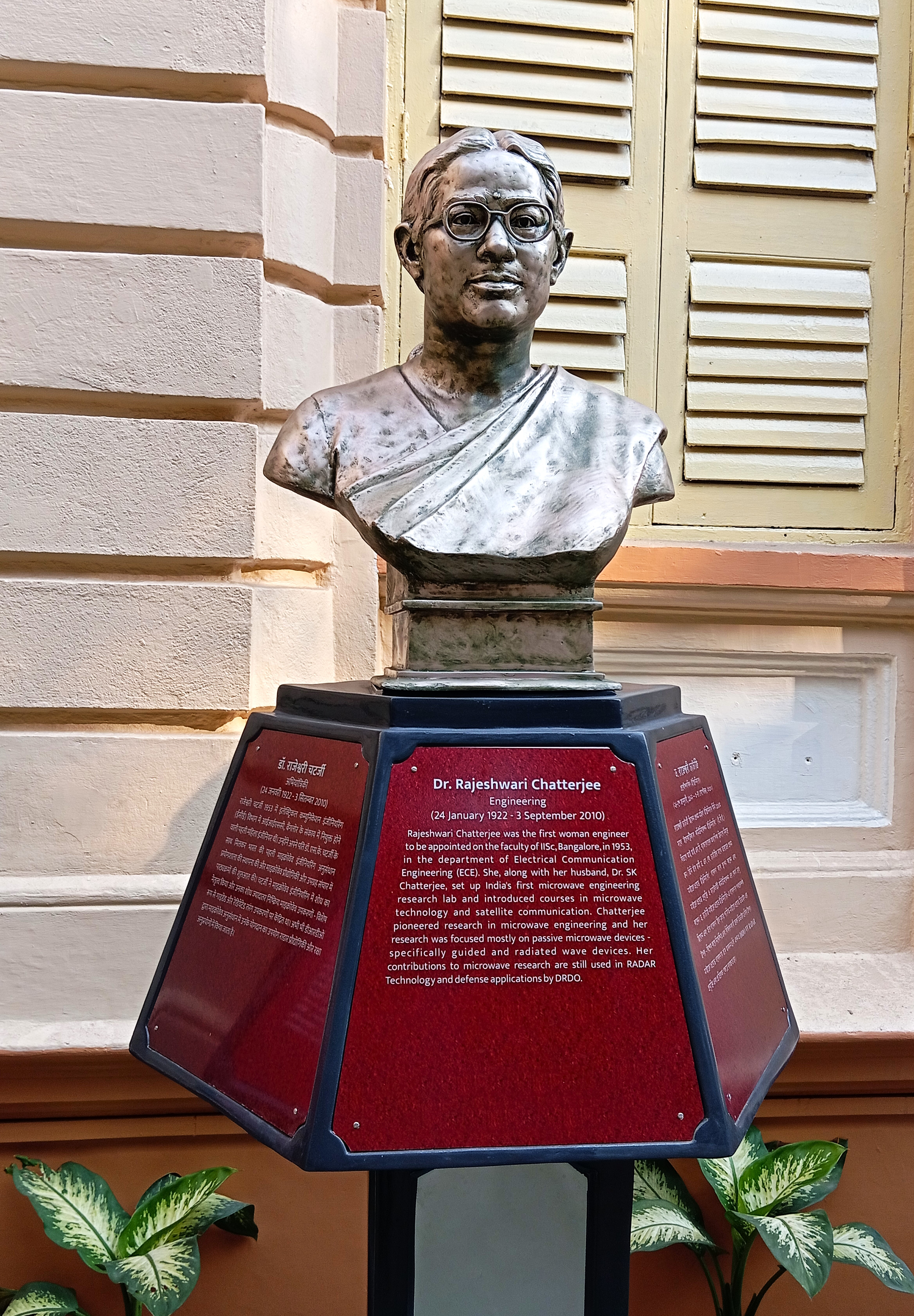
Statue of Rajeshwari Chatterjee, Birla Industrial & Technological Museum, Kolkata, West Bengal, India

In 1953, after obtaining her PhD degree, she returned to India and became a faculty member at the IISc Department of Electrical Communication Engineering, later saying that she taught "electromagnetic theory, electron tube circuits, microwave technology, and radio engineering". That same year, she married Sisir Kumar Chatterjee, who was a faculty member of the same college. After their marriage, she and her husband built a microwave research laboratory and began research in the field of Microwave Engineering, the first such research in India.

In the same period, Chatterjee was selected for the position of chairman in the Department of Electrical Communication Engineering. Over her lifetime, she mentored 20 PhD students, wrote over 100 research papers, and authored seven books. She taught classes in electromagnetic theory, electron tube circuits, microwave technology and radio engineering.

Following her retirement from the IISc in 1982, she worked on social programs, including the Indian Association for Women's Studies. She also preferred to call herself an "engineering-scientist", as she did not work in industry like most engineers.

== Publications ==
- Elements of Microwave Engineering
- Antenna Theory And Practice
- A Thousand Streams: A Personal History
- Dielectric And Dielectric Loaded Antennas
- Advanced Microwave Engineering: Special Advanced Topics
- Vasudhaiva Kutumbakam: The Whole World Is But One Family: Real Stories of Some Women and Men of India
- Antennas for Information Super Skyways: An Exposition on Outdoor and Indoor Wireless Antenna, co-authored by Perambur S. Neelakanta

== Personal life ==
Rajeshwari's father, B.M. Shivaramajah, was an advocate in Nanjangud. Her grandmother, Kamalamma Dasappa, was one of the first women graduates in the erstwhile state of Mysore. Rajeswari married Sisir Kumar Chatterjee, a faculty of IISc in 1953. The couple had a daughter Indira Chatterjee, who is now a professor of electrical and biomedical engineering at the University of Nevada, Reno, U.S.

== Awards ==
For her contribution and works in the field of Microwave engineering, she won many awards. Some of the notable awards and honours are—

- Mummadi Krishnaraja Wodeyar Award for first rank in the BSc (Hons)
- M T Narayana Iyengar prize and the Waters Memorial prize for the first rank in M.Sc.
- Mountbatten prize for the best paper from the Institute of Electrical and Radio Engineering (UK)
- J.C Bose Memorial prize for the best research paper from the Institution of Engineers
- Ramlal Wadhwa Award for the best research and teaching work from the Institute of Electronics and Telecommunication Engineers.

Chatterjee received a posthumous award in 2017 from the Indian Ministry of Women and Child Development, when she was named as one of "the first women achievers of India" for her work in microwave engineering and antennae engineering.
