= Dr. Gurusamy Bridge =

Bridge in Chennai, India

Coordinates: 13.068239°N 80.242698°E

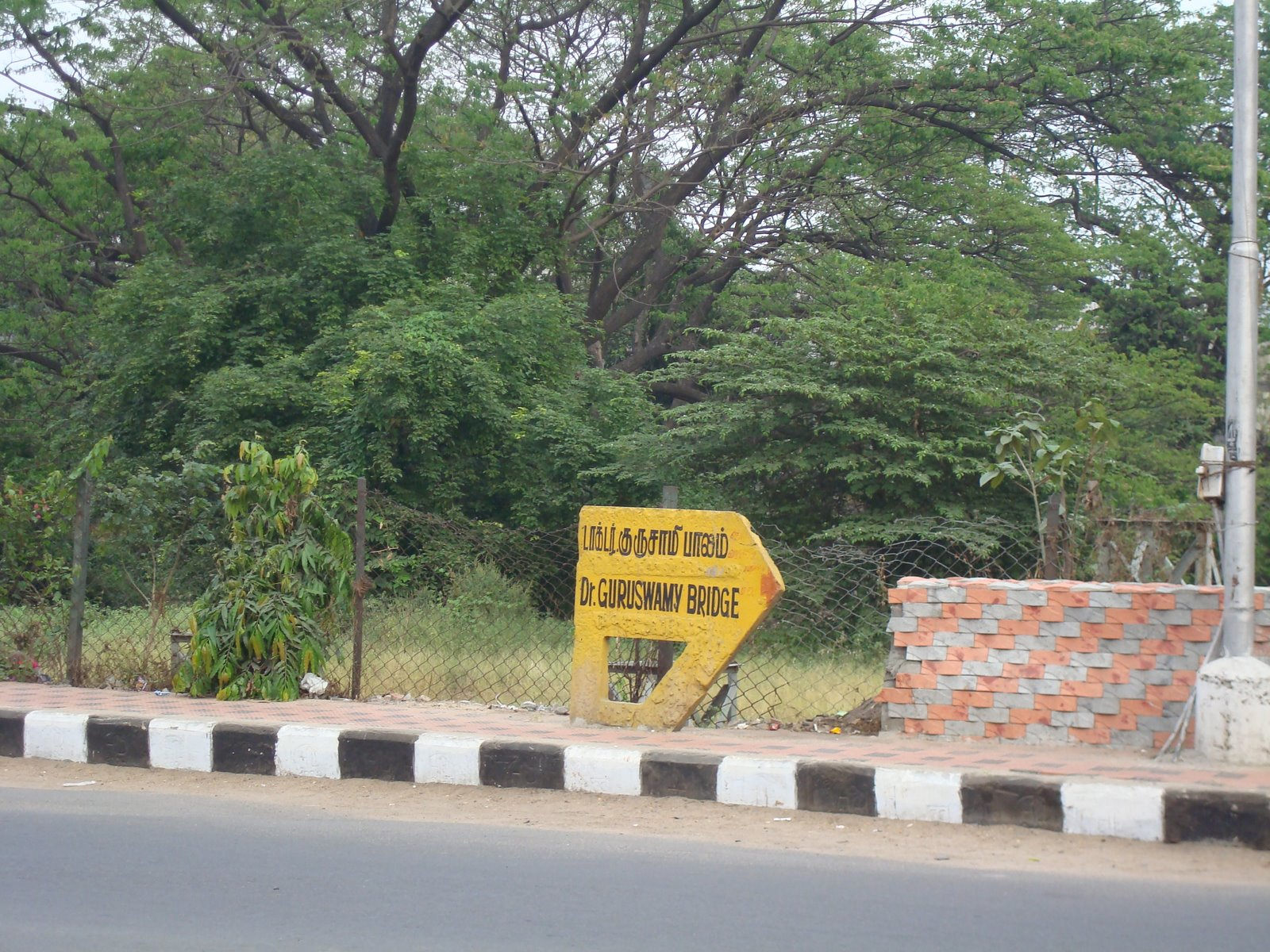
Dr. Gurusamy Bridge in 2012

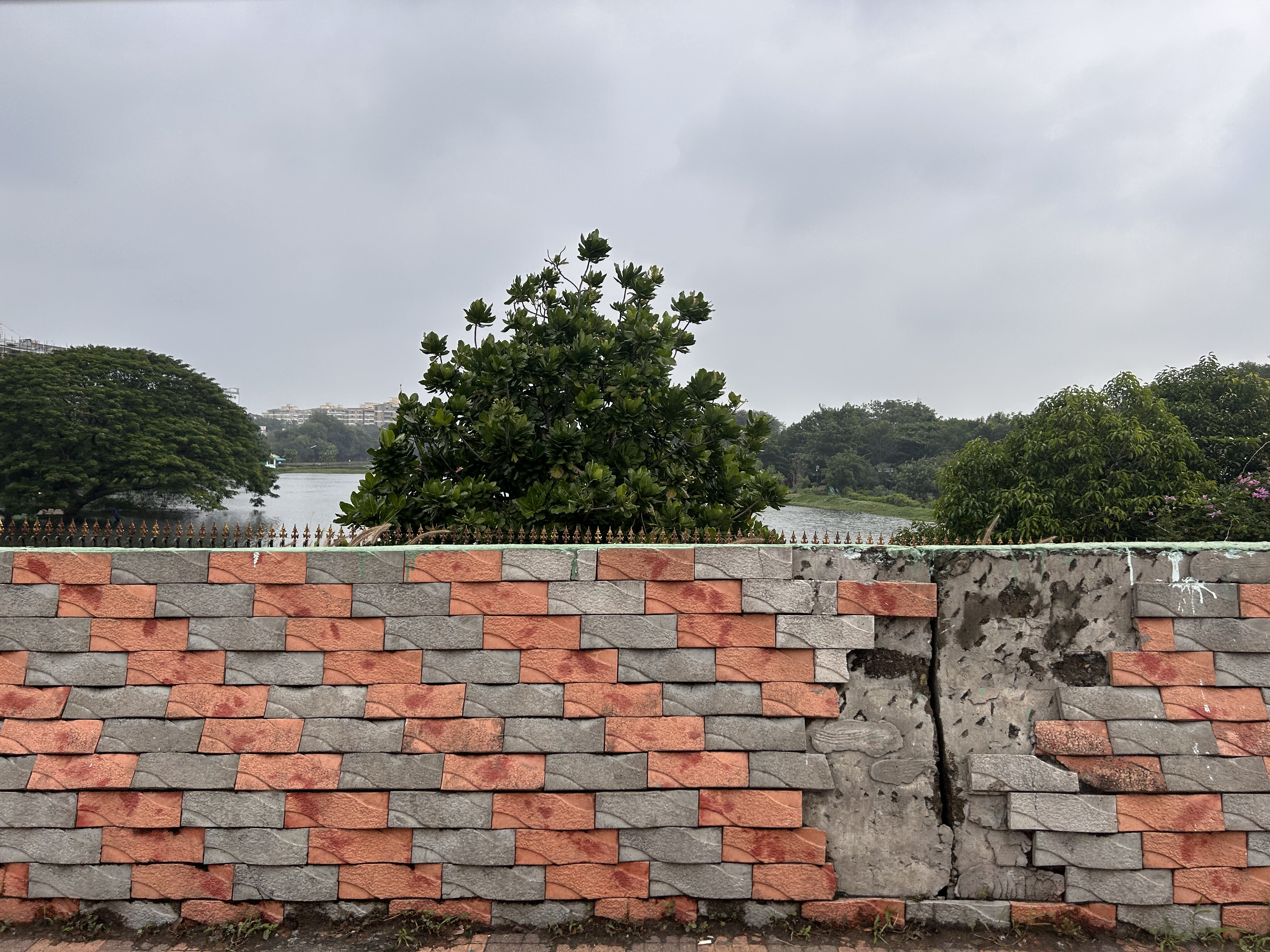
A shot of Chetpet Lake from Dr Guruswamy Bridge in December 2024.

Dr. Gurusamy Bridge or Chetpet Bridge is a road bridge on McNichols Road across the Chennai Beach–Tambaram Line connecting Chetpet with Kilpauk in India. It is named after the medical practitioner and former professor of Madras Medical College, Dr M.R. Guruswami Mudaliar. The bridge was probably built sometime in the 1960s or 1970s, replacing the rail crossing. The rail crossing was torn up, and the old McNichols Road was separated in two. On the Chetpet side, the road became McNichols Road 1st Lane whereas on the other side the name was kept, but was a separate road.
