= Chetpet (Chennai) =

Chetpet Chetput
- neighbourhood
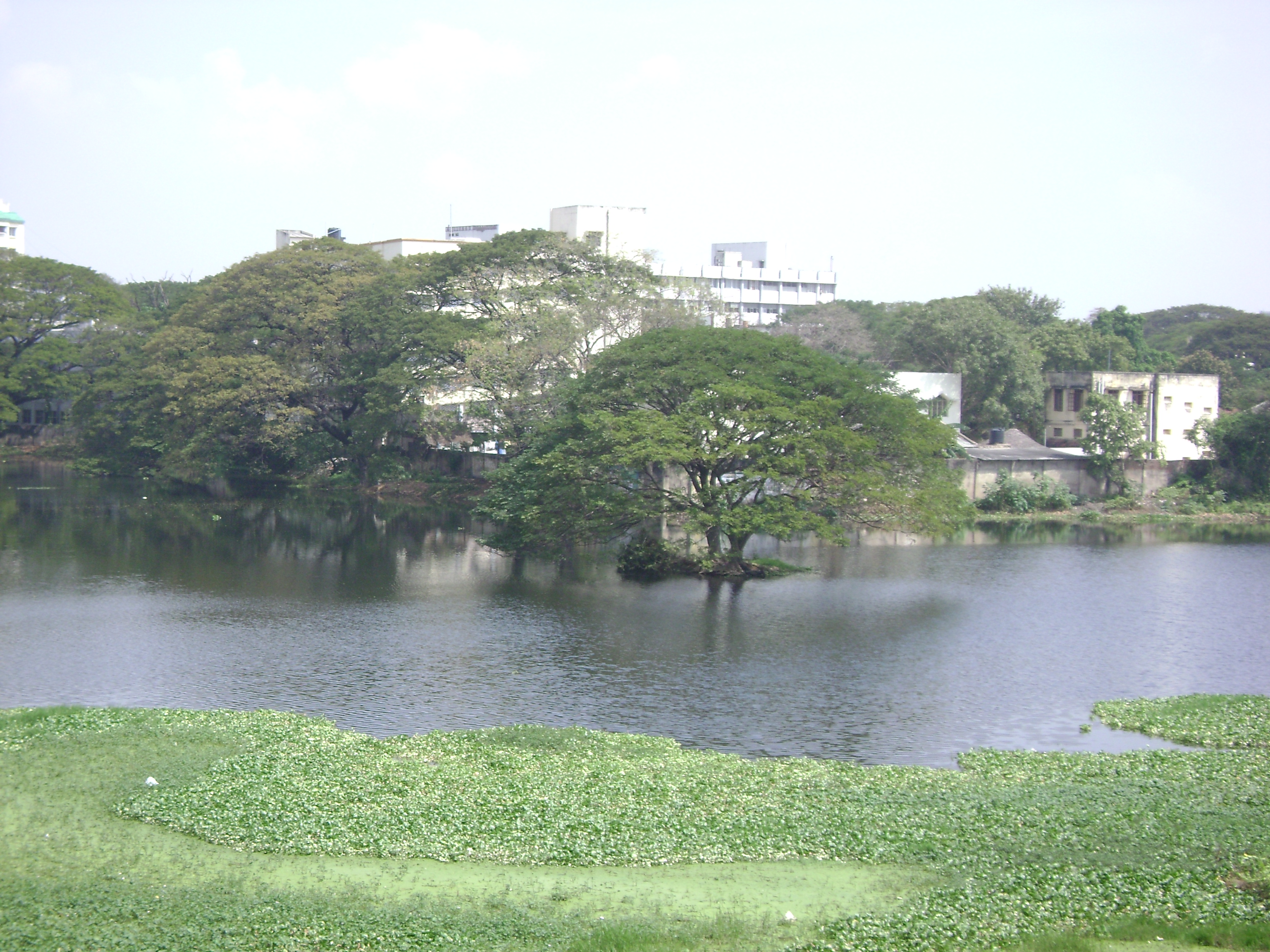
- Chetpet Lake in 2008

- Location within Chennai Location within Tamil Nadu Location within India
- Coordinates: 13.07412°N 80.24238°E
- Country: India
- State: Tamil Nadu
- District: Chennai
- Metro: Chennai

Government
  - Body: CMDA

Languages
  - Official: Tamil
- Time zone: UTC+5:30 (IST)
- Postal code: 600 031
- Planning agency: CMDA

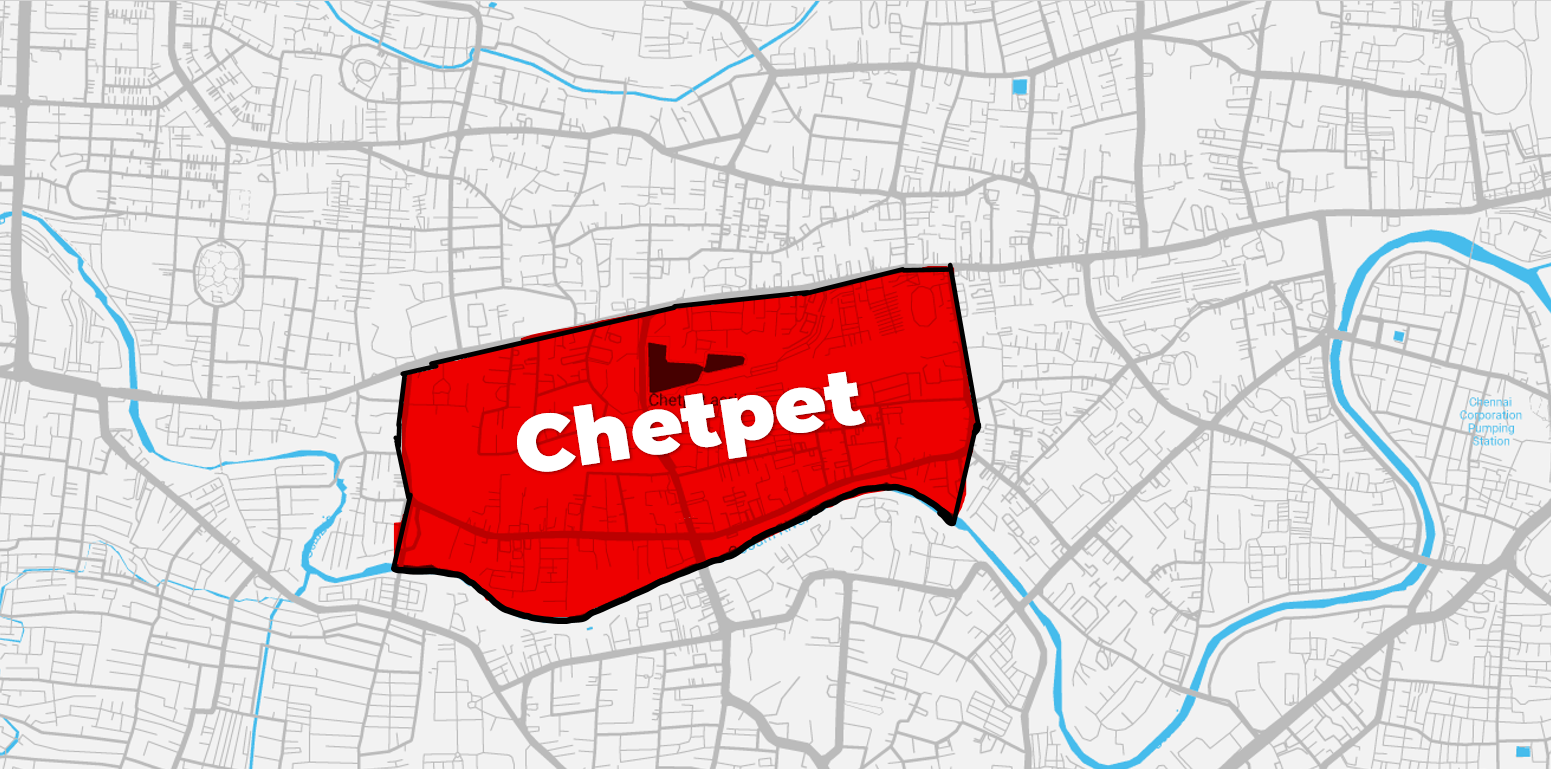
Map Of Chetpet in 2024.

Chetpet (Tamil: [seːt̪ːupːɐʈːɯ]) is a neighbourhood of Chennai, situated about 4.0 kilometres (2.5 miles) from kilometre zero of Chennai city. It is served by the Chetpet railway station in the Beach–Tambaram line of Chennai Suburban Railway. Chetpet has a pond between the Chetpet railway station and the Poonamallee High Road, one of the last surviving natural water bodies in the city. It is the locality in Chennai where the mathematician Ramanujan died.

It has a bridge and two subways (Harrington Road and East Spur Tank Road) that provide a way to cross the railway surrounding all 3 sides.

== History ==
Along with Egmore and Nungambakkam, Chetpet is considered one of the original villages merged by the British to form Chennai.

McNichols Road existed in 1798 as an avenued highway for the greater part of its course from Spur Tank Road towards Poonamallee High Road. It derives its name from Robert McNichol who was Assistant Master Attendant between 1811 and 1822.

=== Spur Tank ===
The Spur Tank was a tank which was present in the southern skirt of EVR Periyar Road (Poonamalee High Road) in the Chetpet area. The tank was slowly encroached upon by 1939 and eventually was completely silted up. The name likely comes due to its "spur-like" shape.

The nearby Spur Tank Road (or Mayor Ramanathan Salai) was named after the tank. The first mention of the Spur Tank was in 1718 by Henry Davidson Love in his Vestiges Of Old Madras. The oldest available map on the internet (1854) indicates the Spur Tank more as a rectangular water body.

The Asiatic Annual Register, Vol. X, published in 1811, refers to the arrival and settling in of Thomas Andrew Strange, who was to become the Chief Justice of the Supreme Court. This note mentions that Strange met several officials belonging to the Madras administration at the Chief Justice’s garden on the Spur Tank, at 9 o’clock on July 12, 1808.

Although some lamented on the shrinking of the Spur Tank in 1939, Some refer to deliberate filling of tanks, including the Spur Tank because of the high amount of mosquitos present there.

Today, there is little to no evidence of the existence of a tank as most of it has been silted up and replaced with subways and playgrounds.

=== Development ===
Until recently, the waters of Chetpet lake supplied groundwater recharge for the surrounding neighbourhoods.

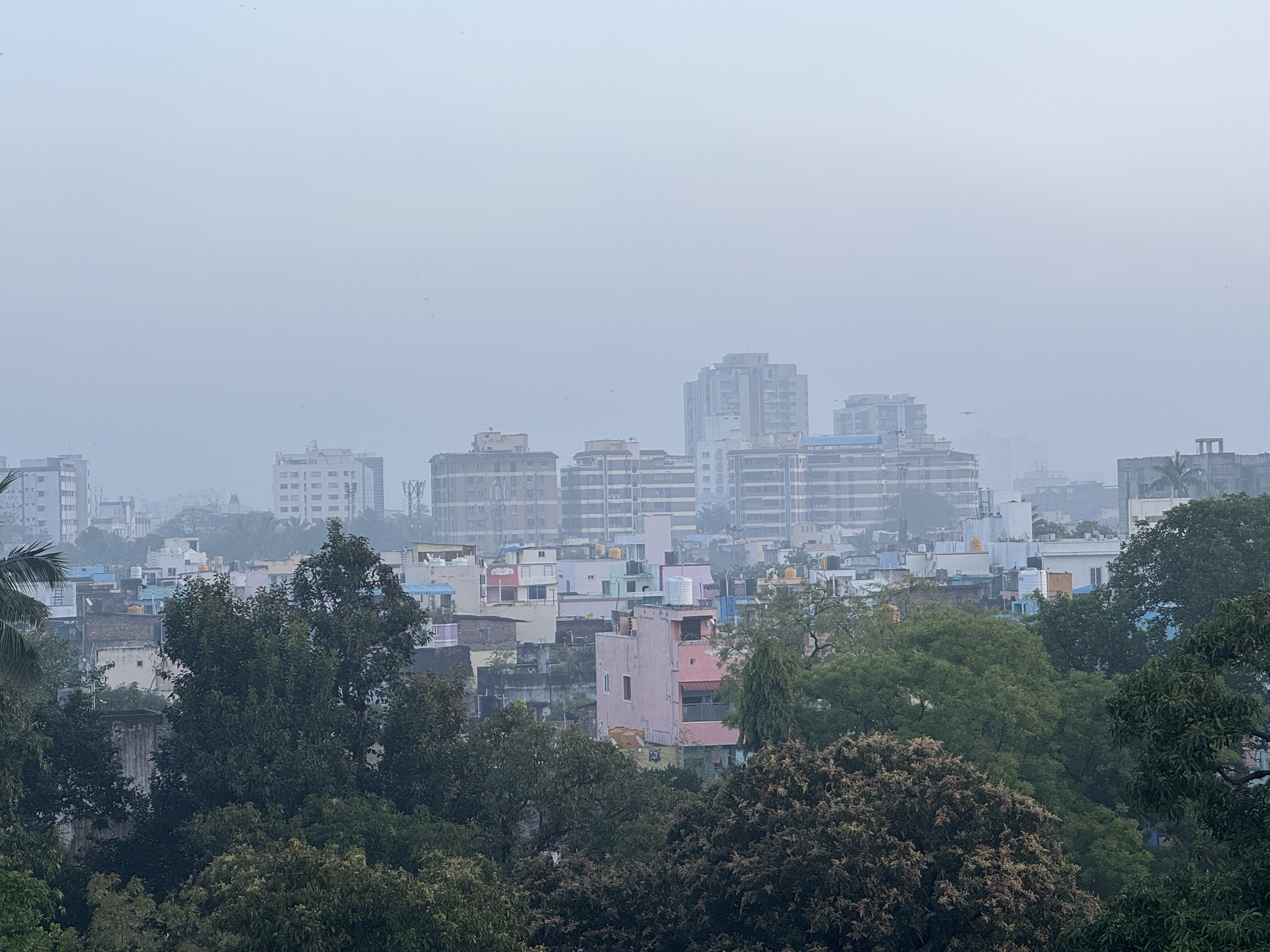
An early morning view of Pullapuram, a neighborhood of Chetpet on 12th March 2025

=== Location – Chetpet ===
Chetpet is located at the center of Chennai, with a suburban station of its own, not far from Chennai Egmore Railway Station. CMBT is 8 km from Chetpet.

Chetpet Eco Park is a famous landmark in this locality. The Karukatthaman Koil is one of the temples in the locality inaugurated on July 12, 1924.

=== Landmarks ===
1. Dr. Guruswamy Bridge - It connects Chetpet to Kilpauk and the EVR Periyar Road to the north.
2. SDAT Ground - The main ground for the Sports Development Authority Of Tamil Nadu
3. Chetpet Bridge - Bridge connecting Chetpet to Nungambakkam to the south.
4. Sankaralayam - A wedding hall inaugurated on 29 March 1995.
5. Chetpet Lake & Eco Park - Chetpet Lake, the only remaining water body of the Spur Tank that dominated the area till the 1970's, was in a bad state until it was saved by the government in May 2012. Along with this, an Ecological Park was created on its shores attracting many tourists to the neighbourhood.
6. The Malayalee Club - A club for Malayalis established here in 1897.
7. Madras Christian College - A Famous college in Harrington Road.
8. Dr. Mehta’s Hospital - Hospital which was relocated to Chetpet in 1955.

=== Educational institutions ===
- Auxilium Girls Higher Secondary School
- Lady Andal Venkata Subba Rao Matriculation School
- Madras Christian College Higher Secondary School
- Madras Christian College Matriculation Higher Secondary School
- Maharishi Vidya Mandir Senior Secondary School
- Sherwood Hall Senior Secondary School
- The Madras Seva Sadan Higher Secondary School
- Union Christian Matriculation Higher Secondary School
- Chinmaya Vidyalaya Harrington Road

== Gallery ==
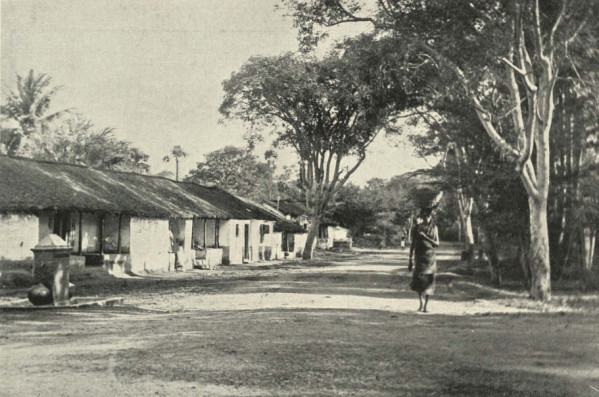
Chetpet village in 1905

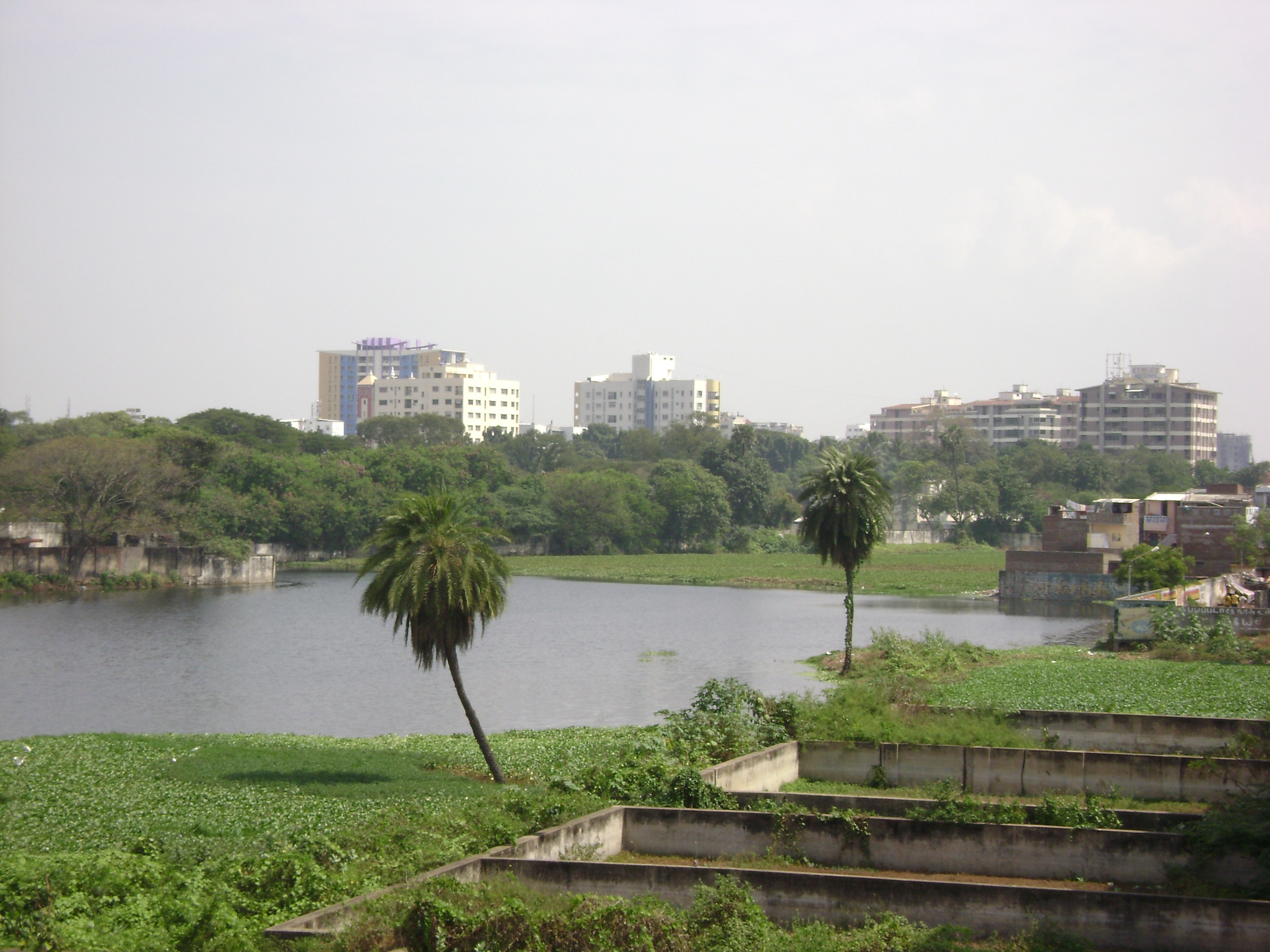

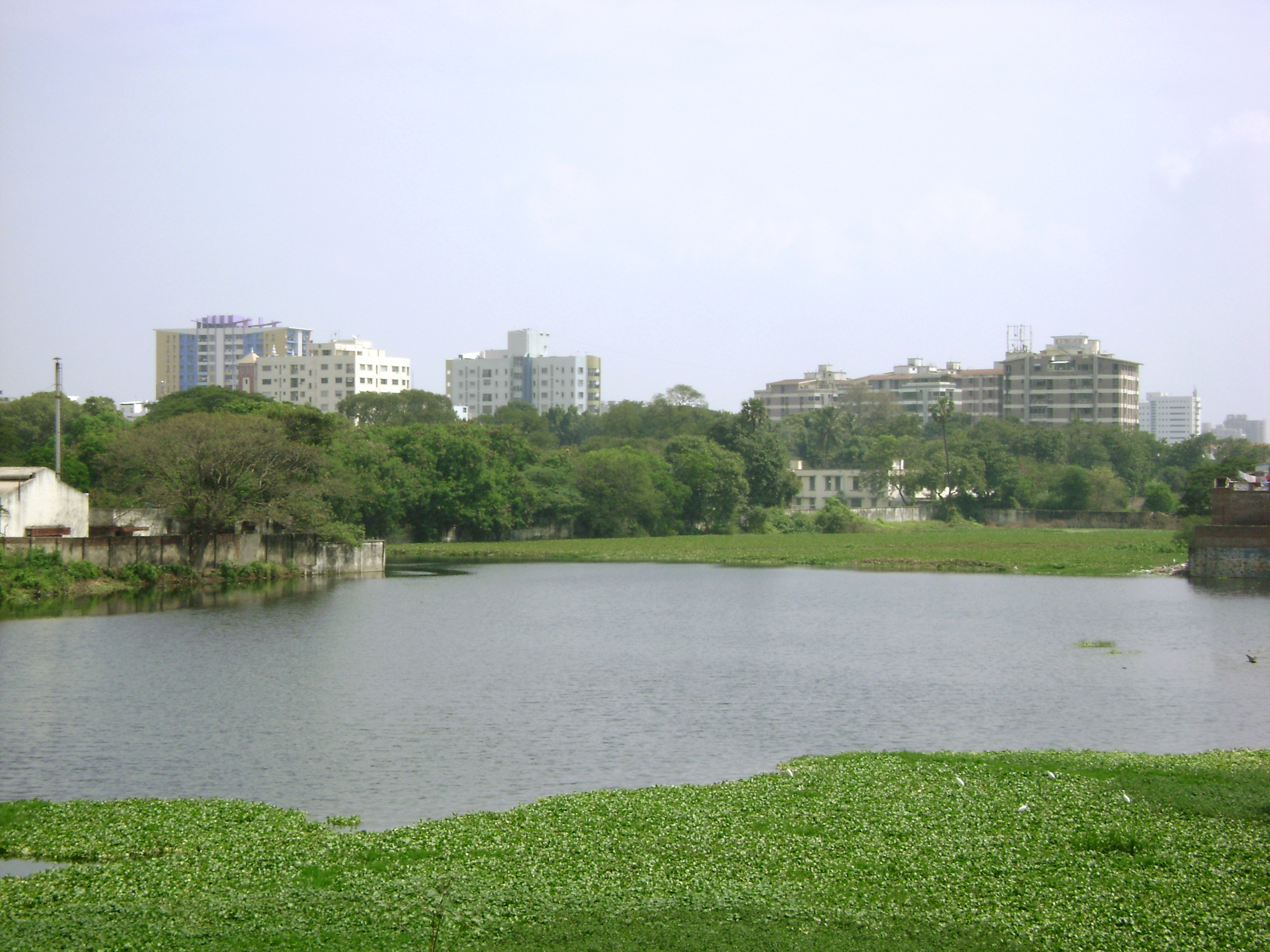

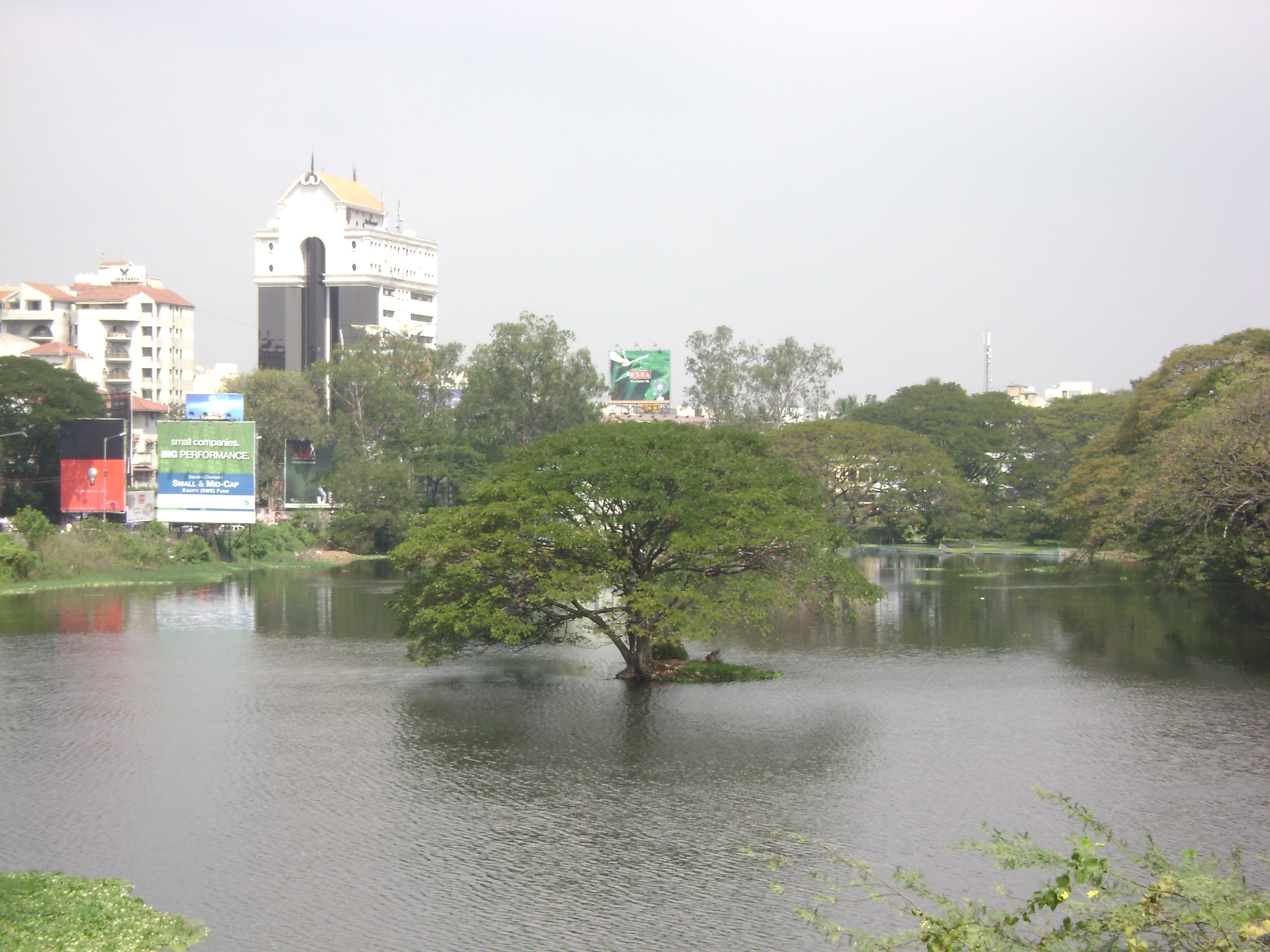

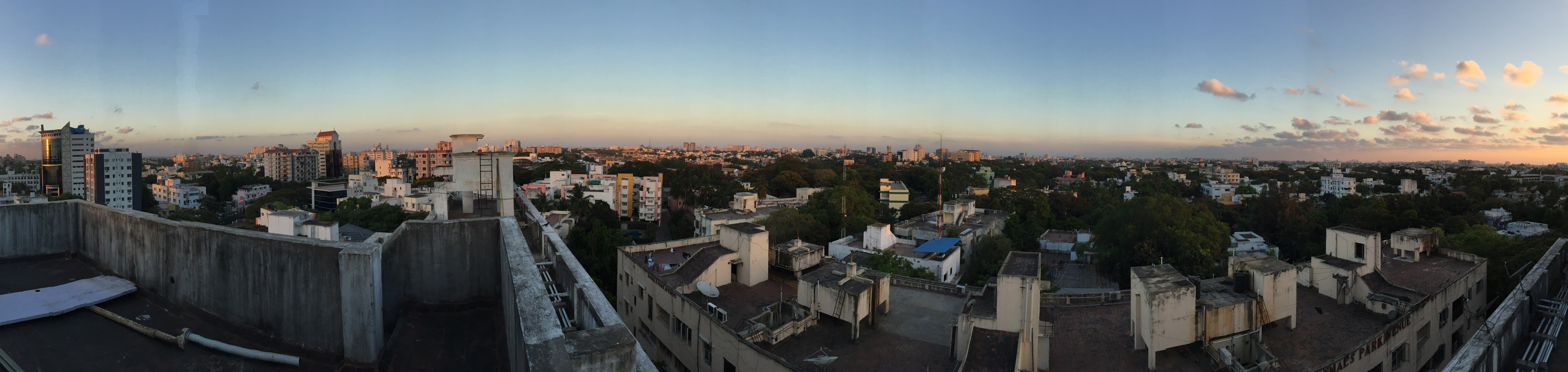
Chetpet View
