= S. Rangachari =

Indian surgeon and gynaecologist (1882–1934)

- Born: 28 April 1882; Kumbakonam, Madras Presidency, India
- Died: 24 April 1934 (aged 51)
- Citizenship: India
- Education: Madras Medical College
- Scientific career
- Fields: Gynecology, Surgery
- Workplaces: Egmore Women's and Children's Hospital

Diwan Bahadur Dr. Sarukkai Rangachari (28 April 1882 – 24 April 1934) was a medical practitioner, surgeon and gynaecologist from the Madras Presidency.

== Early life and education ==
Dr.S.Rangachari was born in a Vaishnavite Brahmin family of Sarukkai near Kumbakonam on 28 April 1882. His father Krishnamachari was an engineer who was involved in the construction of the Napier Bridge and the General Hospital, Madras while his uncle, S. Gopalachari was a distinguished lawyer who served as Diwan of Travancore. Dr. Rangachari studied at the Town High School, Kumbakonam and graduated from the Madras Christian College.

At the encouragement of two European surgeons Nibblock and Gifford, Rangachari joined the Madras Medical College in 1900 graduating in 1904.

== Career ==
Rangachari joined the government service as an Assistant Surgeon in 1906 and served in Egmore, Hyderabad, Mayavaram, Tanjore, Negapatam, Kumbakonam and Berhampore.

In July 1917, Rangachari was made the Deputy Superintendent of the Egmore Women's and Children's Hospital, the first Indian to hold the post. In 1919, he became surgeon and served till 1922, when he quit government service to set up private practice at Kensington Nursing Home on Poonamallee High Road. The doctor often treated his patients for free.

== Death ==
Rangachari succumbed to a typhoid epidemic on 24 April 1934. He was 52 at the time of his death.

== Flying Doctor ==
Rangachari, initially, used a cycle and then, a motorbike to visit his patients. In the late 1920s, Rangachari purchased a Rolls-Royce Phantom I for Rs. 52,000. Later, he bought a Puss Moth aeroplane for Rs. 60,000 to travel quickly and easily around the Presidency. This got him the appellation "Flying Doctor".

== Personal life ==
Rangachari married twice, his first wife dying early. His second marriage to Kamalamma lasted longer.

== Public honor ==
The public of Madras subscribed to a statue in honor of this surgeon, which was unveiled by Lord Erskine, Governor of Madras, in 1939. That statue still stands near the exit gate of the Government General Hospital, Chennai.
