= Central College, Bengaluru =

College in Bangalore, Karnataka, India

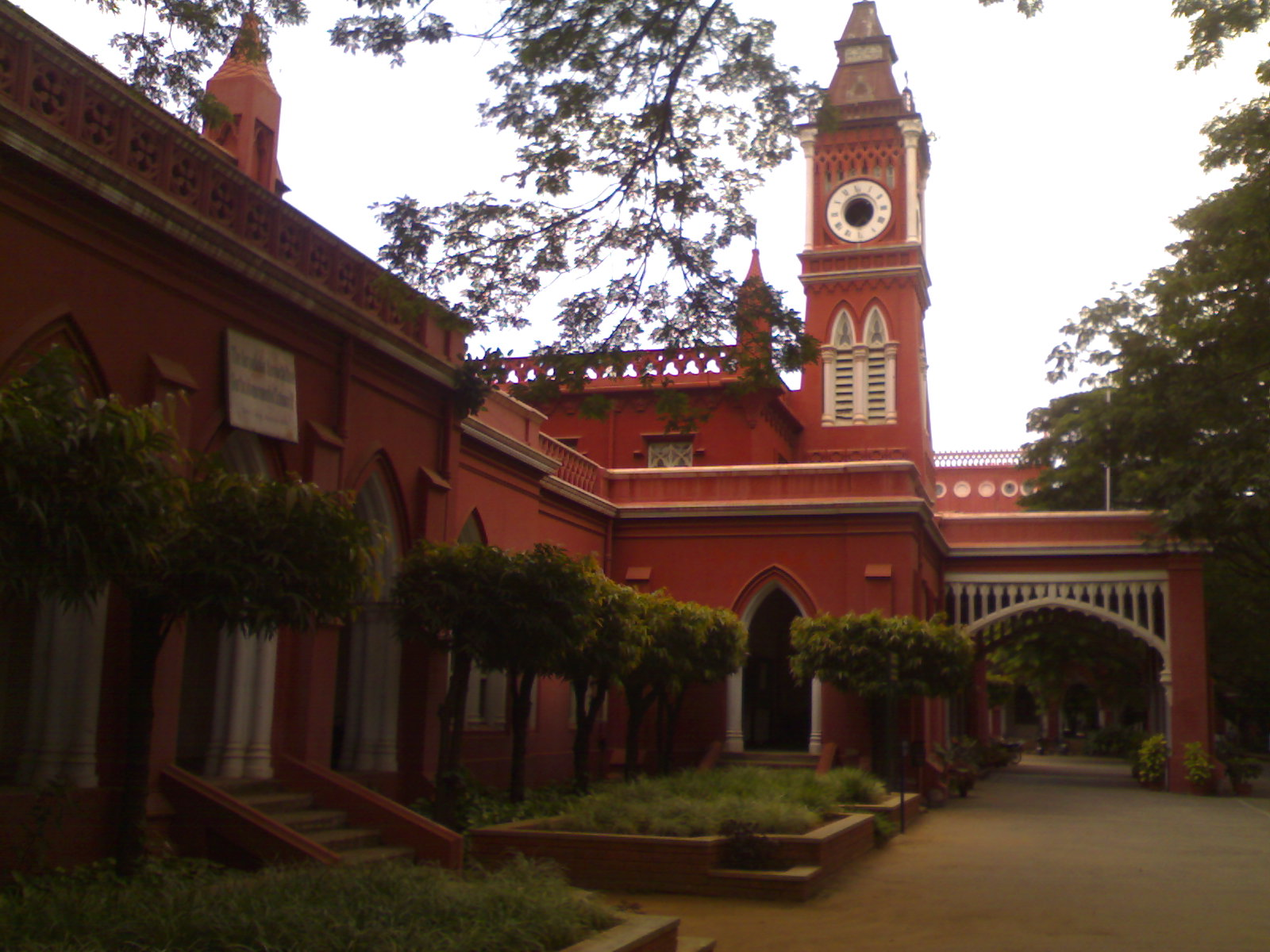
Central College building in Bengaluru

Central College Bengaluru (1858) is one of the oldest colleges in India. This college was originally affiliated to University of Mysore in Mysore State. Rev. John Garrett was the founder and first principal of the Central High School, which was afterwards renamed Central College. In 1964, with the reorganization of the Indian state and the formation of Karnataka, Central College was transferred to Bangalore University, a new university formed in 1965 to meet the needs of the people of Bengaluru. Initially, the two colleges of the city, the Central College (CC) and the University of Visvesvaraya College of Engineering (UVCE) formed the nucleus of Bangalore University.

== History ==
The Central College, Bengaluru was first started as Central High School by Rev. John Garrett in 1858.

In 1886, the British government converted it to a college to award University Degrees. It was renamed as the Bangalore University from Central College, Bangalore by the University Grants Commission (India) on 10 July 1964 by the government under the then State of Mysore to consolidate institutions of higher education in the city of Bangalore. The Bangalore University, which was created out of University of Mysore in 1964, was operated for many years from the Central College till 1973, when the Jnana Bharathi campus was established. Sir C. V. Raman, Nobel Laureate Physicist, was associated with the University while working at the Indian Institute of Science. He had announced his Nobel winning work at the University premises based in Central College, Bengaluru in 1927. He was awarded the Nobel prize in 1930. The Central College Campus retained as the City Campus of Bangalore University houses the City offices of the Vice Chancellor, Registrar, Registrar (Evaluation), Finance (Examination part), UGC Academic Staff College, Directorate of Correspondence Courses and Distance Education Centre, Directorate of College Development Council, Directorate of Physical Education and a few post graduate departments and support services, with a state of the art Jnana Jyothi Auditorium. Besides, the Central College also has the Central College Cricket Pavilion where the Karnataka State Cricket Association was first established and trained several cricketers of International repute.

== Notable Teachers ==
- B. S. Madhava Rao, Principal (1952–55) of Central College and Professor of Mathematics
- E. P. Metcalfe, Principal of Central College
- P. C. Mahalanobis
- C. N. S. Iyengar, Founder Head of the Department of Mathematics, Karnataka University Dharwad
- John Guthrie Tait, Teacher of famous men including C. Rajagopalachari & Navaratna Rama Rao
- M. J. Thirumalachar, Shanti Swarup Bhatnagar laureate
- T. S. Venkannayya
- A. R. Krishnashastry

== Notable students ==
- Bharat Ratna Sir M. Visvesvaraya
- Bharat Ratna C. Rajagopalachari
- Bharat Ratna C. N. R. Rao, Indian chemist
- Shivakumara Swami
- Pusapati Vijayarama Gajapati Raju, Maharaja of Vizianagaram
- H. Narasimhaiah
- Guruswami Mudaliar
- Hospet Sumitra
- N. Santosh Hegde, Justice
- Navaratna Rama Rao, leading administrator, author and founder of the Sericulture Department
- N. S. Subba Rao
- Maya Rao (1928-2014), Kathak guru
- K. M. Koushik, politician
- Rajeshwari Chatterjee, pioneer in Indian microwave engineering
- Rahul Dravid, former India and Karnataka cricket player and captain
- B. G. L. Swamy, Indian botanist and Kannada writer.
- T. Madiah Gowda, Politician
- Deshmudre Mallappa Chandrashekhar, Chief Justice of Allahabad and Karnatak High Court
