= Bangalore Fort =

Historic mud fort in Kamataka, India

- Part of Bangalore District
- Karnataka, India
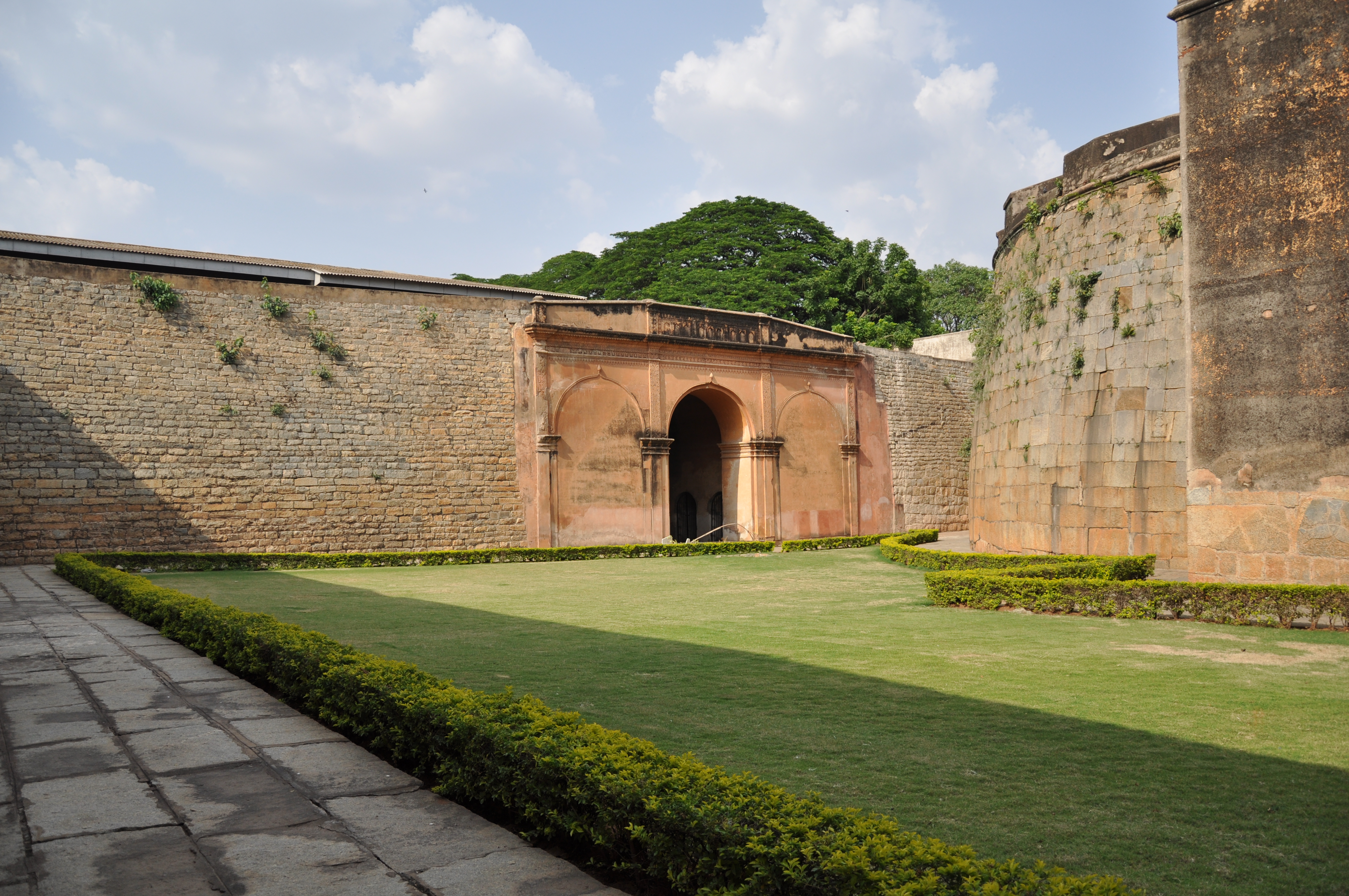
- Bangalore Fort

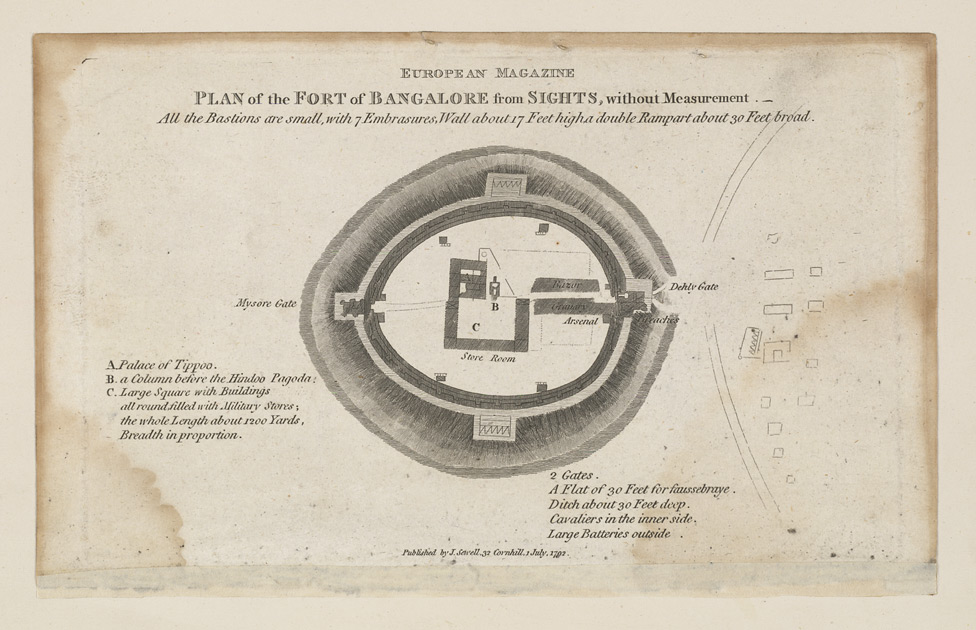
- Plan of Bangalore Fort, 1792

Site information
- Type: Fort
- Controlled by: Archaeological Survey of India
- Open to the public: Yes
- Condition: Fair

Location
- Bangalore Fort in Bengaluru City
- Location within Bengaluru
- Coordinates: 12.962875°N 77.575956°E

Site history
- Built: 1537
- Built by: Kempegowda I
- Materials: built in 1751 CE with granite stones south of 2 centuries old mud fort

Bangalore Fort began construction in 1537 as a mud fort. The builder was Kempe Gowda I, a vassal of the Vijayanagara Empire and the founder of Bangalore. The then Sultan of Mysore Hyder Ali in 1761 replaced the mud fort with a stone fort and it was further improved by his son, Tipu Sultan in the late 18th century. Though damaged during the Anglo-Mysore war in 1791, it still remains a good example of 18th-century military fortification. The army of the British East India Company, led by Lord Cornwallis on 21 March 1791 captured the fort in the Siege of Bangalore during the Third Mysore War (1790–1792). At the time the fort was a stronghold for Tipu Sultan. Today, the fort's Delhi gate, on Krishnarajendra Road, and two bastions are the primary remains of the fort. A marble plaque commemorates the spot where the British breached the fort's wall, leading to its capture. The old fort area also includes Tipu Sultan's Summer Palace, and his armoury. The fort provided the setting for the treasure hunt in the book Riddle of the Seventh Stone.

== History ==
The confirmed history of the Bangalore Fort is traced to 1537, when Kempe Gowda I (pictured), a chieftain of the Vijayanagara Empire, widely held as the founder of modern Bangalore, built a mud fort and established the area around it as Bengaluru Pete, his capital.

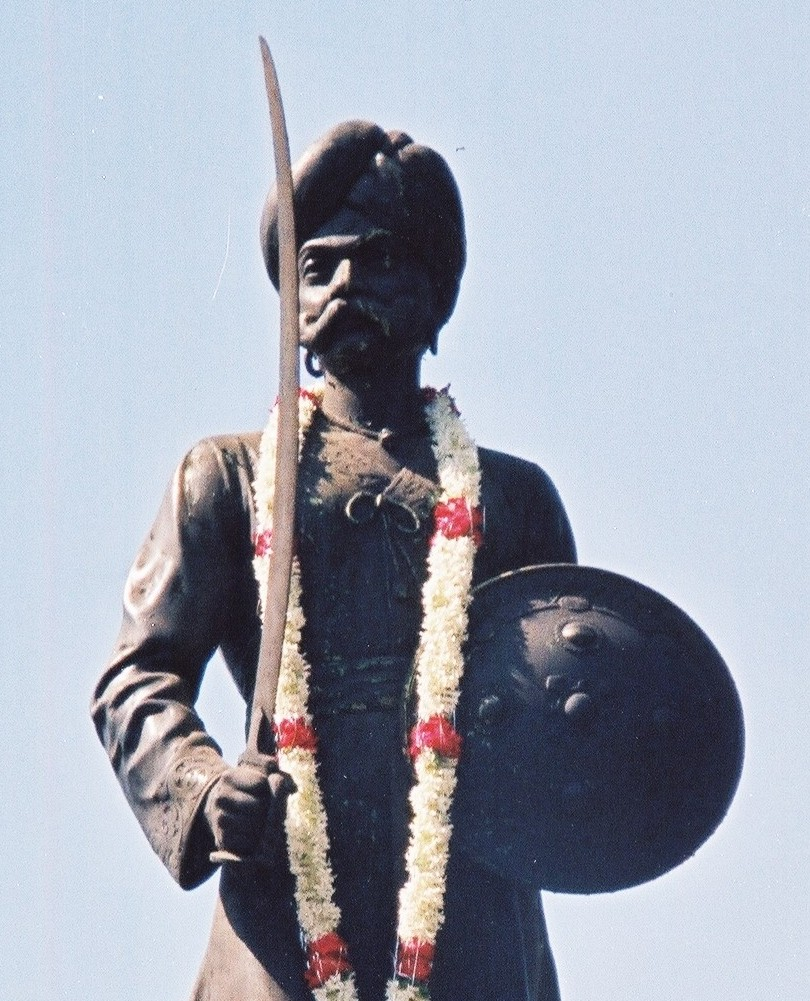
Kempe Gowda I, builder of Bangalore or Bengaluru Pete, his statue opposite to the Bangalore Corporation office

Kempe Gowda, who showed remarkable qualities of leadership from childhood, had a grand vision to build a new city. This intention was further fueled by his visits to Hampi, the beautiful capital city of the Vijayanagar Empire, now a UNESCO heritage city. He persevered with his vision and got permission from King Achyuta Deva Raya, the ruler of the empire at that time, to build a new city for himself. The King gifted 12 hoblis (revenue subdivisions) with an annual income of 30,000 varahas (gold coins) to Kempe Gowda to meet the expenses of his venture of building a new city.

Kempe Gowda moved from his ancestral land of Yelahanka to establish his new principality, having obtained support from the King. One version for the site selection process for the fort and the Bengaluru Pete is that during a hunting expedition along with his Advisor Gidde Gowda, Kempe Gowda went westward of Yelahanka and reached a village called Shivasamudra (near Hesaraghatta), some 10 miles (16 km) from Yelahanka where, in a tranquil atmosphere under a tree, he visualized building a suitable capital city with a fort, a cantonment, tanks (water reservoirs) and temples for people of all trades and professions. It is also said that an omen of an uncommon event of a hare chasing away a hunting dog at the place recommended its selection. A dream of the goddess Lakshmi (the Hindu Goddess of wealth) that prophesied a prosperous future, further sealed his decision on the place for his capital. Therefore, on an auspicious day in 1537, he conducted a ground breaking ritual and festivities by ploughing the land with four pairs of decorated white bulls in four directions, at the focal point of the junction of Doddapet and Chikkapet, the junction of the present day Avenue Road and Old Taluk Kacheri Road (OTC).

Thereafter, Kempe Gowda constructed a mud fort (now in the western part of the city), with a moat surrounding it, and nine large gates. The building of the mud fort is also steeped in a legend. During the construction of the fort it was said that the southern gate would collapse no sooner than it was built and human sacrifice was necessary to ward off the evil spirits. When Kempe Gowda would not accept human sacrifice, his daughter-in-law, Lakshamma, realising her father-in-Law's predicament, beheaded herself with a sword at the southern gate under the cover of night. Subsequently, the fort was completed without any mishap. In her memory, Kempe Gowda built a temple in her name in Koramangala. Thus, Kempe Gowda's dream came to fruition and the Bengaluru Pete evolved around the mud fort called the Bangalore Fort.

In 1637–38, the Bangalore Fort under Kempe Gowda's rule was very prosperous. Rustam-i-Zaman (Randaula Khan), the commander under the Bijapur Sultanate who was on a war campaign, having captured the Sira Fort close to Bangalore, wanted to capture the Bangalore Fort and the city. However, Kasturi Ranga Nayak, who had been given the Sira Fort to hold, prevailed on Randaula not to attack the fort, after the town had been taken and the fort surrounded with 30,000 strong cavalry. Kempe Gowda managed to get Nayak to withdraw the troops. Randaula Khan, who was not convinced about the action of Nayak in withdrawing the troops, met Nayak in his tent and promised him more rewards and also recognition under the Bijapur rulers. Nayak relented but advised Randaula not to attack the fort at that time, since he would manage surrender of the fort by Kempe Gowda eventually. Soon enough he prevailed on Kempe Gowda to surrender the fort with all its riches and without any battle. Randaula then took over the fort and handed over its management to Shahji, along with other territories that he had recently conquered, with Bangalore as his headquarters.

This mud fort was enlarged during Chikkadeva Raya Wodeyar's rule between 1673 AD and 1704 AD. In 1761, it was renovated by Hyder Ali, who fortified it with stones. A part of the fort was subject to bombardment by the British when they fought a battle against Tipu Sultan, son of Hyder Ali. Tipu Sultan repaired the fort later. Inside the fort, there is a temple dedicated to Lord Ganapathy.

On March 1791, the army of the British East India Company led by Lord Cornwallis laid siege to the Bangalore Fort during the Third Mysore War. Following tough resistance by the Mysore army led by the Commandant Bahadur Khan, in which over 2000 Mysore soldiers were killed, on 21 March the British breached the walls near the Delhi Gate and captured it. In the words of the British chronicler Mark Wilks, "Resistance was everywhere respectable." With the capture of the Bangalore Fort the Army of British East India Company replenished supplies and obtained a strategic base from where it could attack Srirangapatna, Tipu Sultan's capital.

Siege of Bangalore, 1791

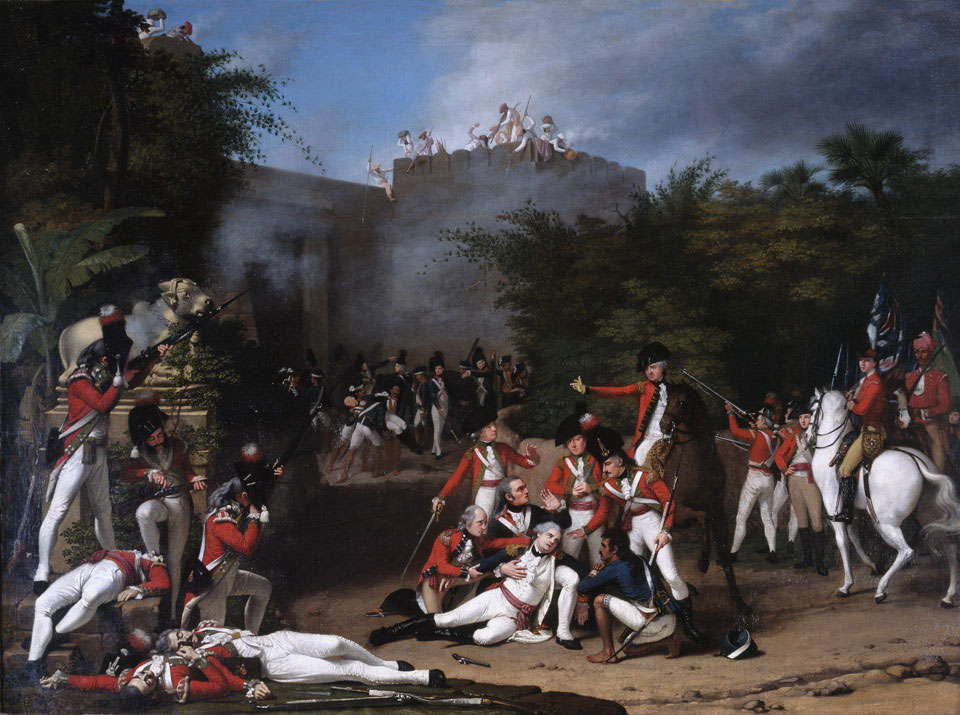
The Death of Colonel Moorhouse at the Storming of the Pettah Gate of Bangalore

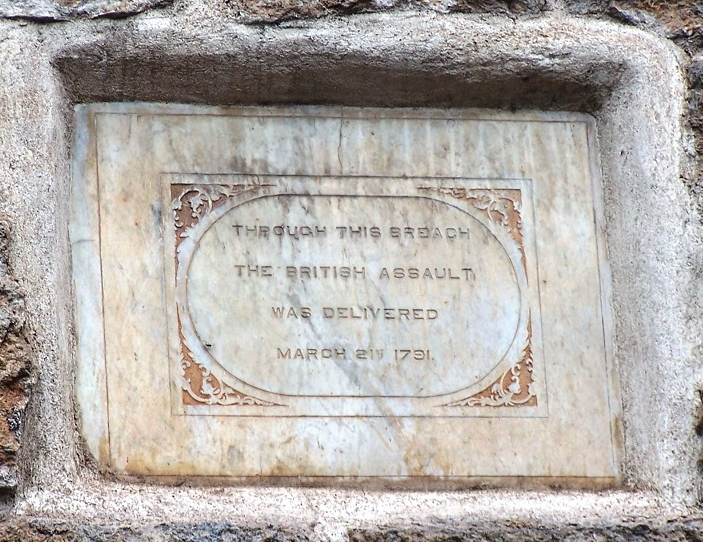
Siege of Bangalore (1791) British Plaque, Bangalore Fort

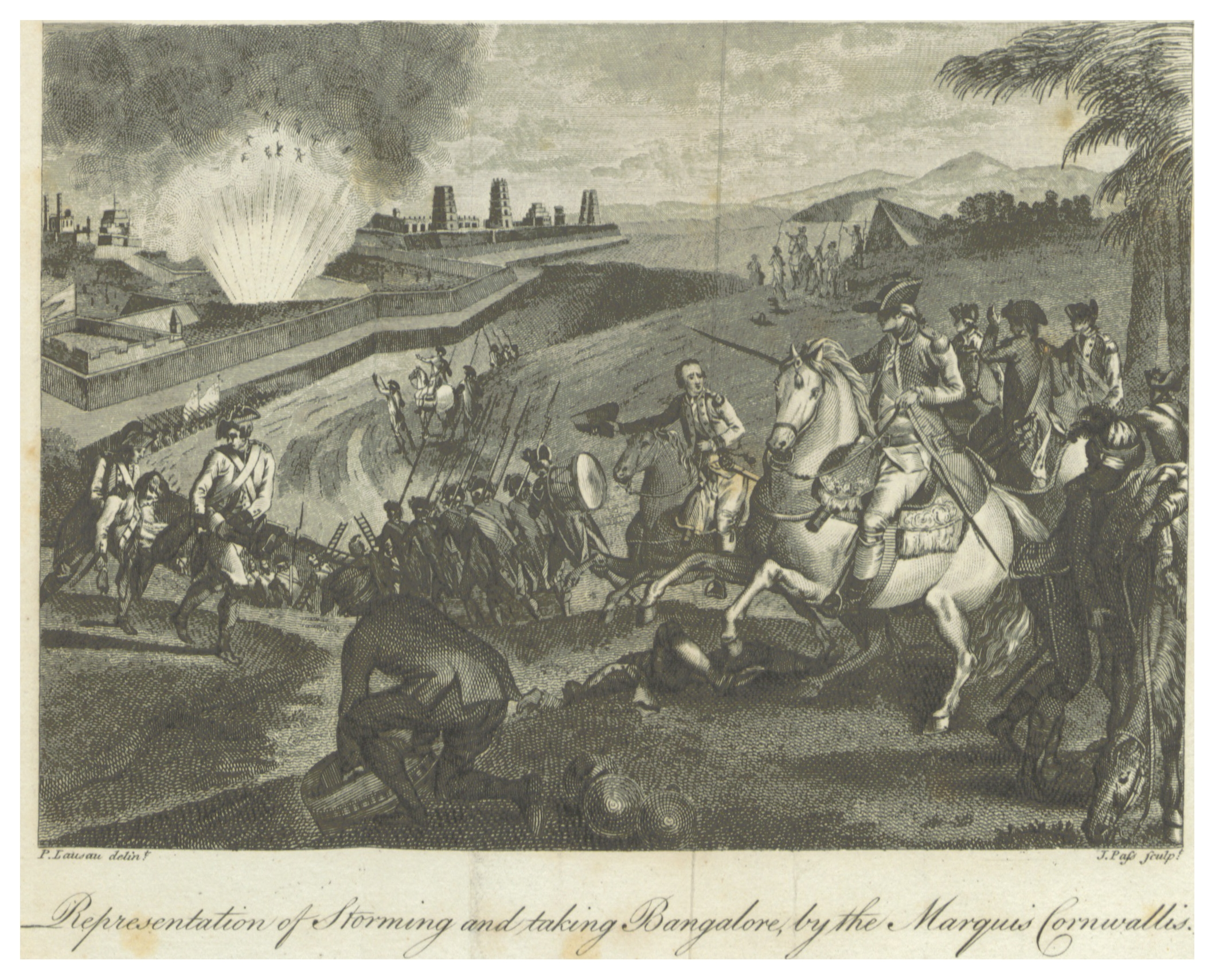
Storming and taking of Bangalore by the Marquis Cornwallis

== Fort structure ==
The Bangalore fort, ca. 1791, was described as follows:

Bangalore, like Madras, had a fort, with a pettah, or fortified town, outside it. This lay-out was a feature of almost all the cities or settlements in India, the fort providing a place of refuge for most of the inhabitants if the pettah was in danger of capture. The fort at Bangalore had a perimeter of about one mile; it was of solid masonry, surrounded by a wide ditch which was commanded from 26 towers placed at intervals along the ramparts. To its north lay the pettah, several miles in circumference and protected by an indifferent rampart, a deep belt of thorn and cactus, and a small ditch. Altogether Bangalore was not a place which invited attack.

— Sandes, Lt Col E.W.C. (1933) The Military Engineer in India, Vol 1

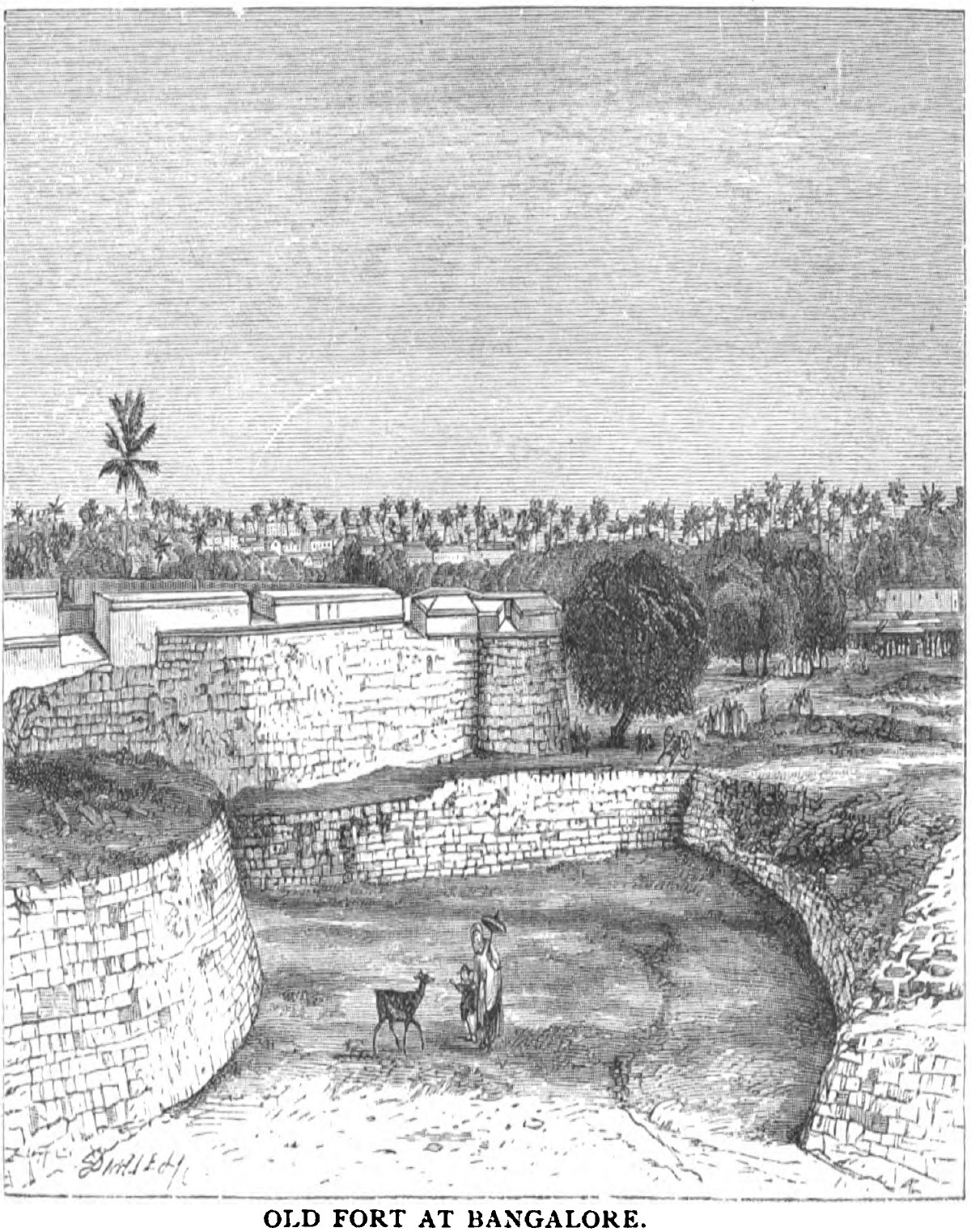
Old Fort at Bangalore (MacLeod, p. 144, 1871)

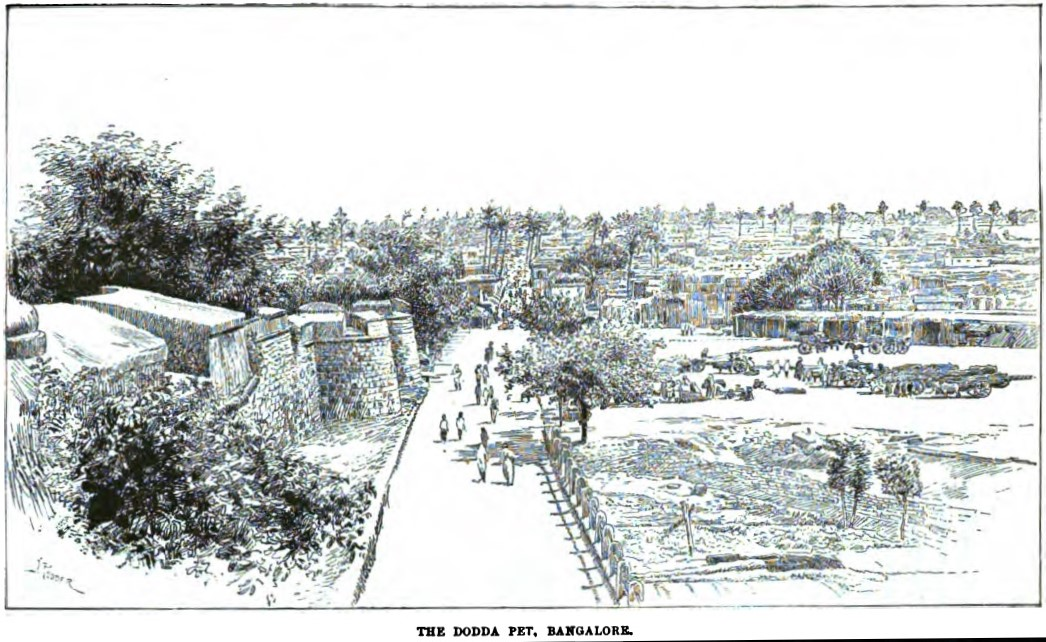
The Dodda Pet, Bangalore (Caine, 1891, p. 523)

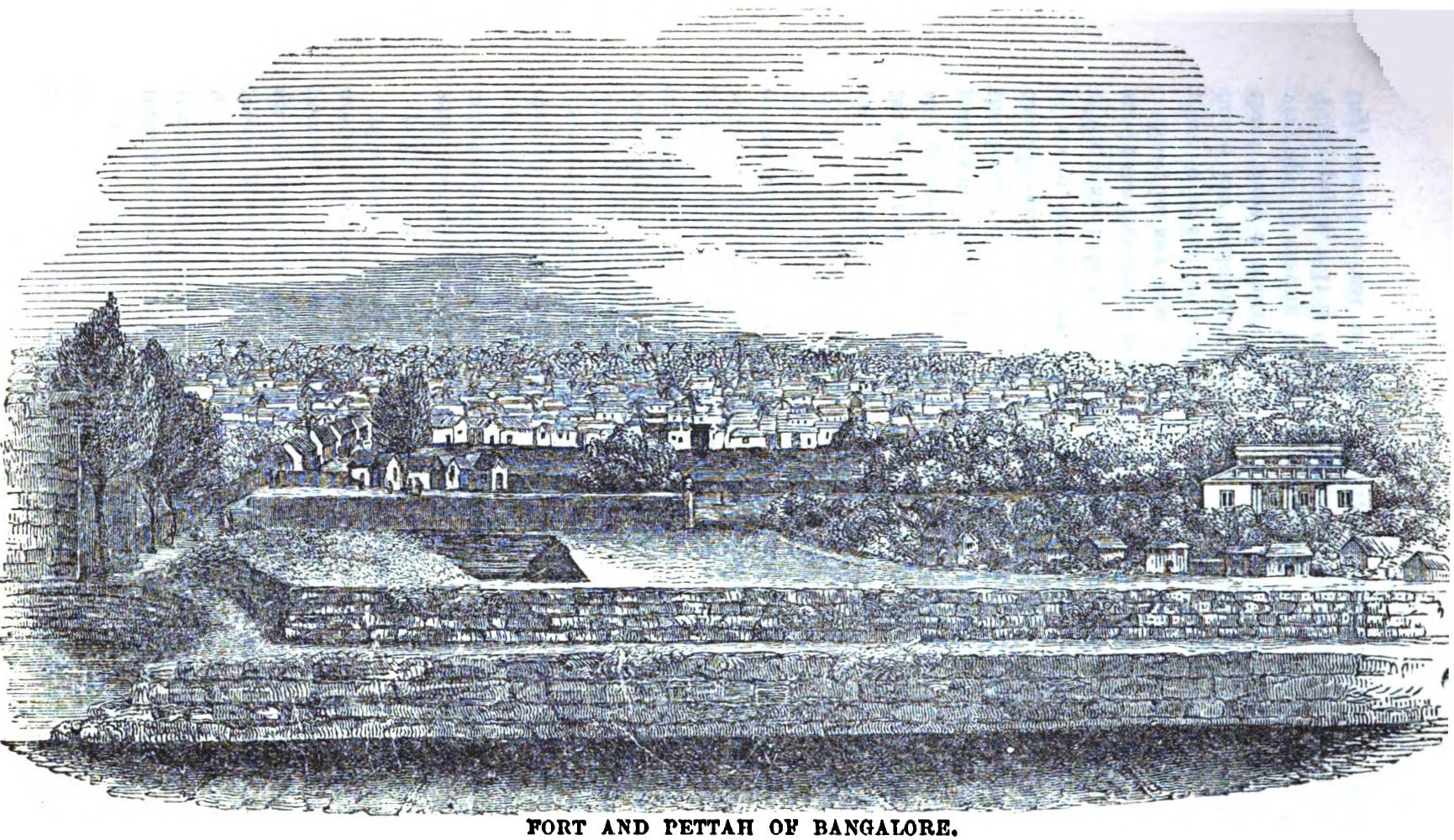
Fort and Pettah of Bangalore (p. 139, 1849)

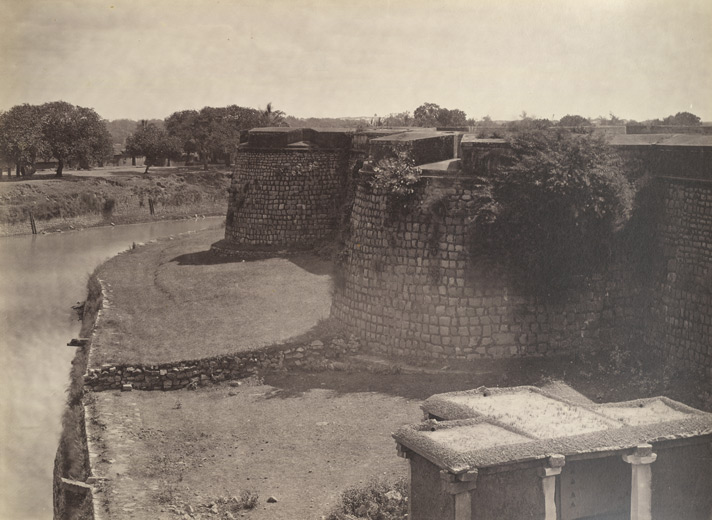
Bangalore Fort in 1860 showing fortifications and barracks

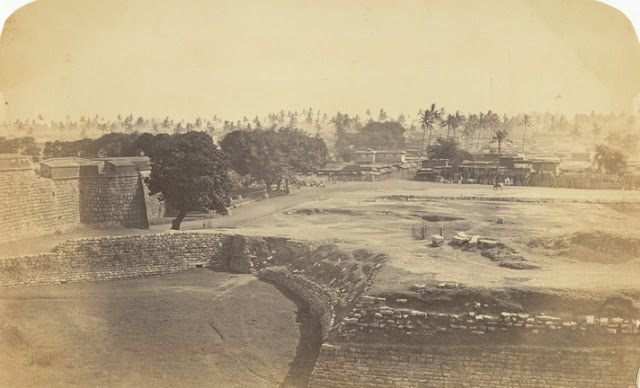
Fort, Bangalore (1855) - Vibart Collection: Views in South India

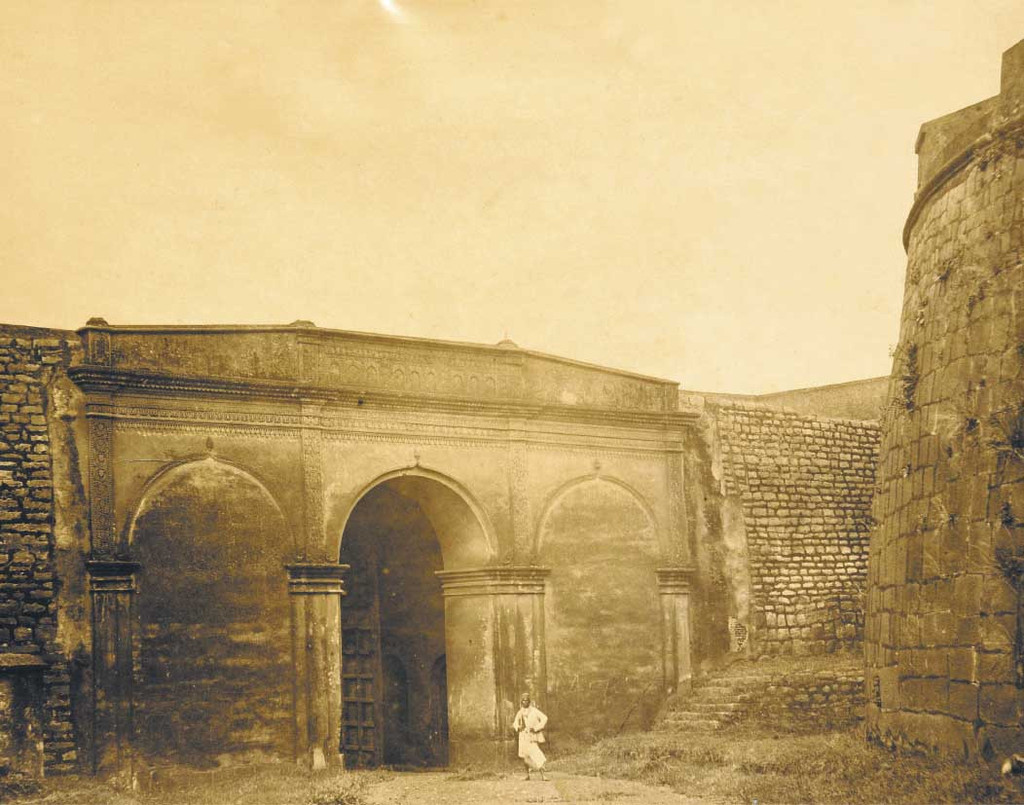
Old Fort Gate of Bangalore (1883), by Albert Thomas Watson PENN (1849–1924)

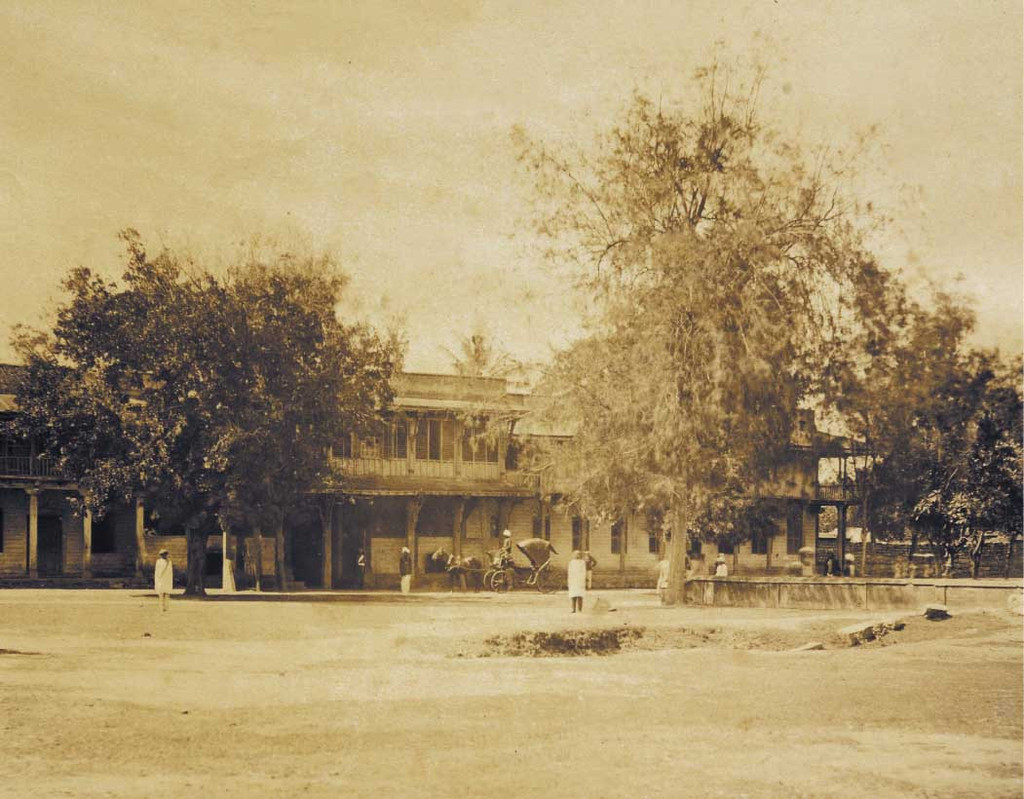
Palace inside the Fort of Bangalore (1883), by Albert Thomas Watson PENN (1849–1924)

What remains of the fort today is just the Delhi Gate, and the rest has been demolished. It was originally about a km in length. Stretching from the Delhi Gate, up to the present KIMS campus. Within the Bangalore Fort were the present Victoria Hospital, the Kote Venkataramana Swamy temple, Tipu Sultan's Summer Palace, Makkala Koota park, the armoury in the Bangalore Medical College campus, Fort High School, Fort Church, Minto Ophthalmic Hospital, and the present KIMS hospital and campus.

== Fort Church ==
The Fort Church, Bangalore, was located within the Bangalore Fort. The church was demolished to make place for the construction of the Vani Vilas Hospital. The Government of Mysore allotted land in Chamrajpet for construction of a new church, and this is now the St. Luke's Church. Early records refer to this church as the Drummer's Chapel, constructed by British soldiers after the fall of Tipu Sultan. The Fort Church, Bangalore was the first protestant church to be raised in Bangalore.

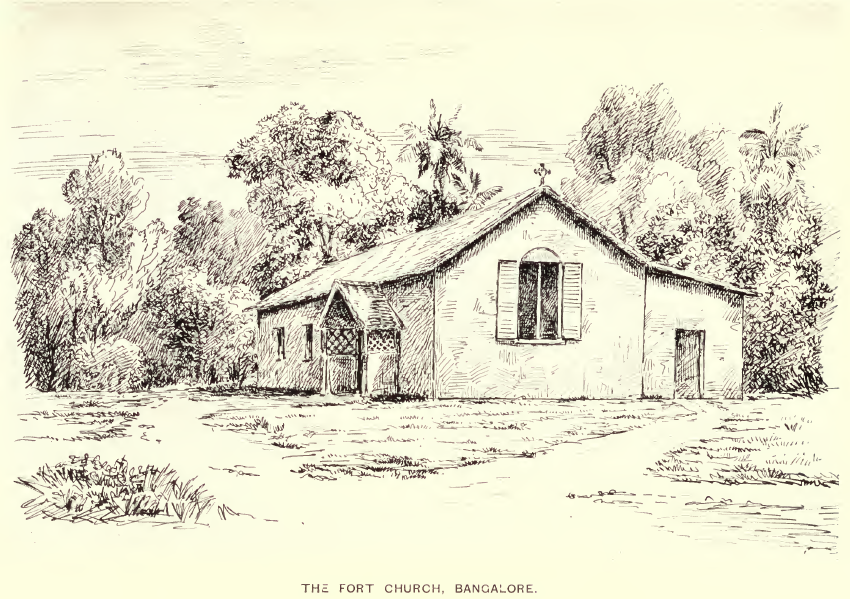
Illustration of the Fort Church, Bangalore (1912), from Rev. Frank Penny's Book 'The Church in Madras, Volume II'. The Church was moved during the construction of the Vani Vilas Hospital and is now the St. Luke's Church, Chamrajpet.

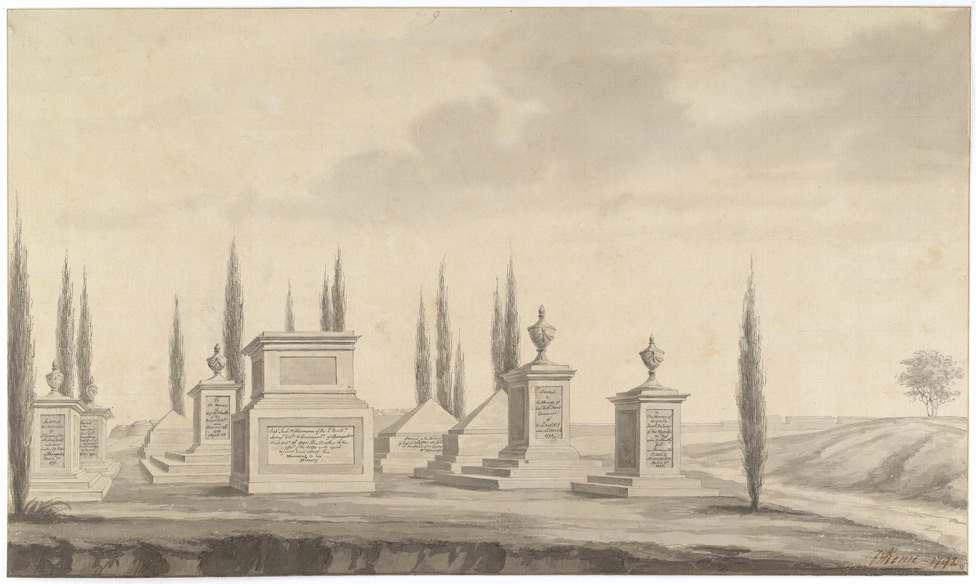
View of the burial ground at Bangalore - Select Views in Mysore, the country of Tippoo Sultan by Robert Home (1752–1834)

== Fort Cemetery ==
The Fort Cemetery, where the officers who fell in the Siege of Bangalore were buried, is illustrated in Robert Home's book, Select Views in Mysore, the country of Tipu Sultan, published by Robert Bowyer, London, 1794. Home's painting shows the graves of Captains James Smith, James Williamson, John Shipper, Nathaniel Daws and Jeremiah Delany, Lieutenant Conan and Lieutenant-Colonel Gratton. As recorded in 1895, The cemetery was located just outside the Fort Church, with the church being responsible for its maintenance. The cemetery had cypress trees, rose bushes and flowers. The Government of Mysore, had constructed a wall and gate for the cemetery.

However, as recorded in 1912 by Rev. Frank Penny in his book The Church in Madras: Volume II, the cemetery no longer existed. The record of the offers who fell in the battle for the Bangalore Fort in 1791, were transferred to the cenotaph, raised by the Government of Mysore. The cenotaph was consequently vandalised on 28 October 1964 and completely destroyed.

== Fort School ==
The Fort Church, managed the Fort School from the end of the 19th century. The church provided furniture, study maps, and managed accounts, all overseen by the Fort Church School Committee. The Diocesan Magazine, records that on 29 December 1909, with Miss. Rozario as the head mistress (serving from 1893 to 1909), a school function being organised for the present and old students of the Fort School, by J W Hardy, Lay Trustee of the Fort Church, with prize distribution by E A Hill, School inspector and Rev. G H Lamb. In 1911, the head mistress was Miss Page, as recorded by the Diocesan Magazine.

There still exists a Fort School at Chamrajpet, with its building dating back to 1907. Once called the English Vernacular School, the Fort School is located opposite the Bangalore Medical College, and near the Tipu Sultan's Summer Palace. The School Building was built in 1907, and has amongst its students freedom fighter H S Doreswamy, cricketer G R Vishwanath, statesman V S Krishna Iyer, Mysore Maharaja Jayachamarajendra Wadiyar, former Chief Minister of Karnataka Kengal Hanumanthaiah and bureaucrat Narasimha Rao. The building is being studied by INTACH for possible renovation. The Fort School is the oldest high school in the Banglore pete area. The school at present has 186 students in English Medium and 81 studying in Kannada Medium. Majority of the English Medium students are from Tamil and Telugu families, studying all subjects in English, English language, mother tongue language and Kannada as third language.

== Present status ==
All that remains of the fort is the Delhi Gate and remnants of two bastions. After they captured the fort in 1791, the British started dismantling it, a process that continued till the 1930s. Ramparts and walls made way for roads, while arsenals, barracks and the other old buildings quickly made way for colleges, schools, bus stands, and hospitals. In November 2012 workers at the neighbouring Bangalore Metro construction site unearthed 2 huge iron cannons weighing a ton each with cannonballs dating back to the times of Tipu Sultan.

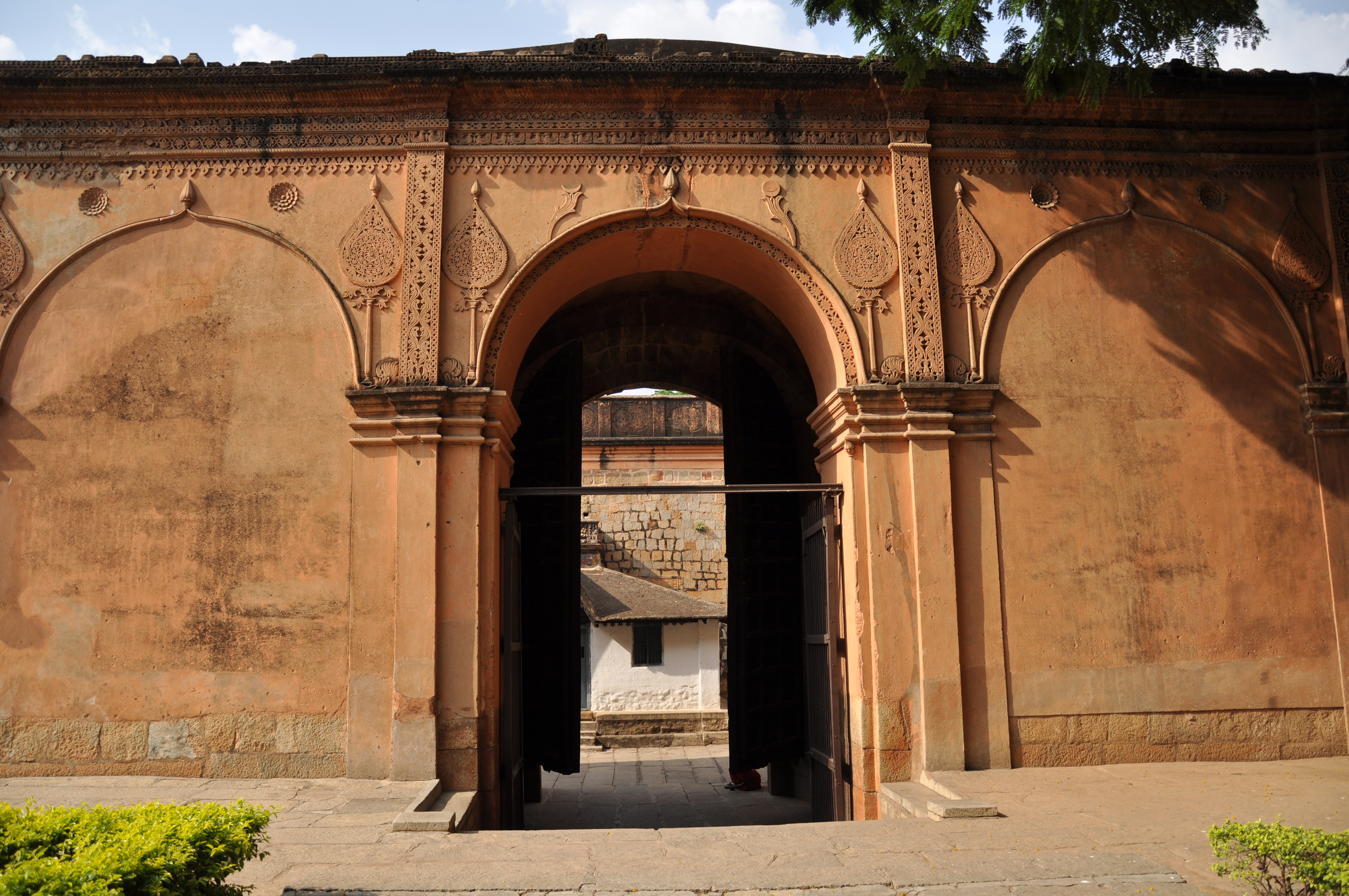
Existing Gate of the Bangalore Fort

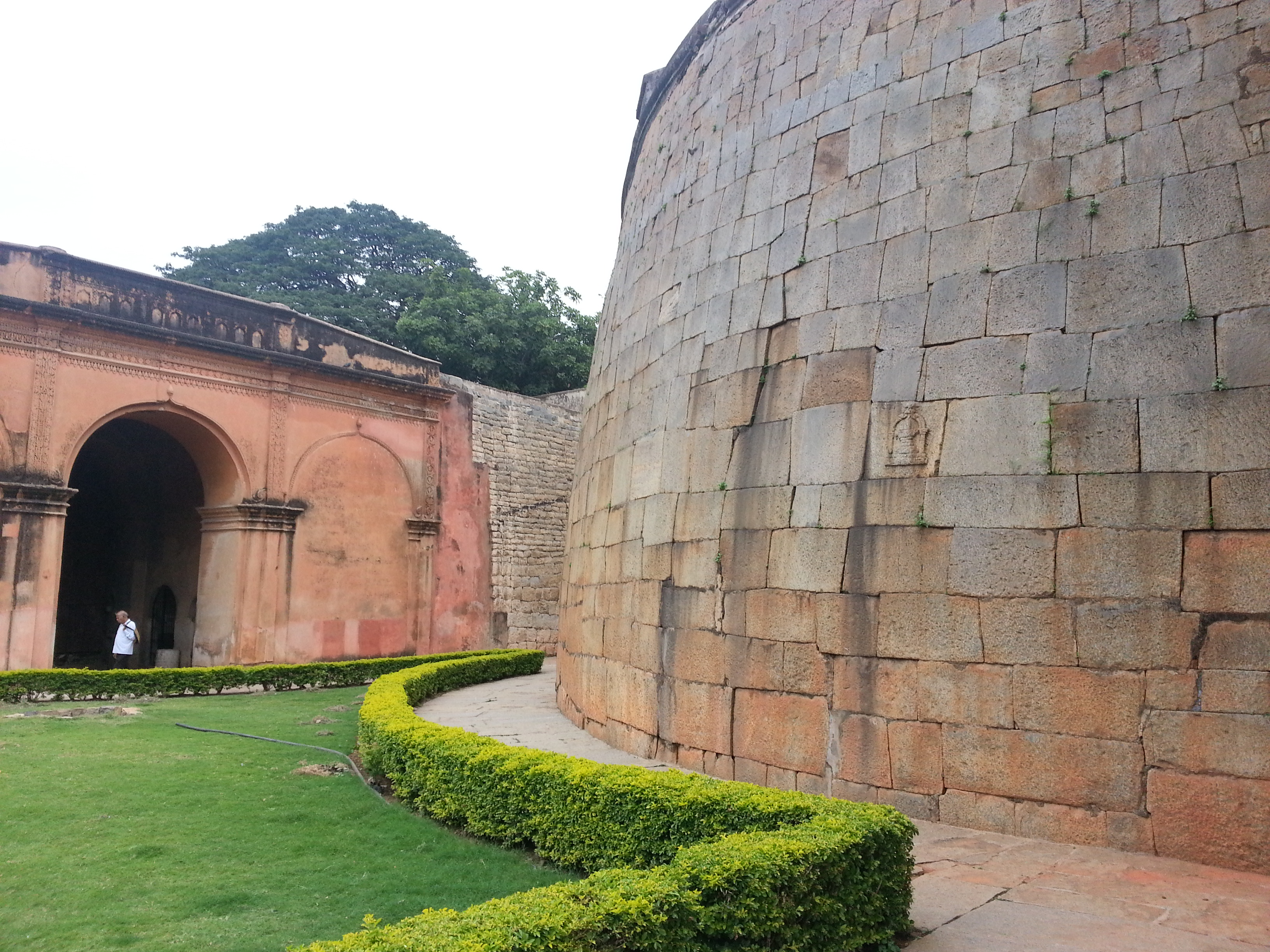
Inside the Bangalore Fort

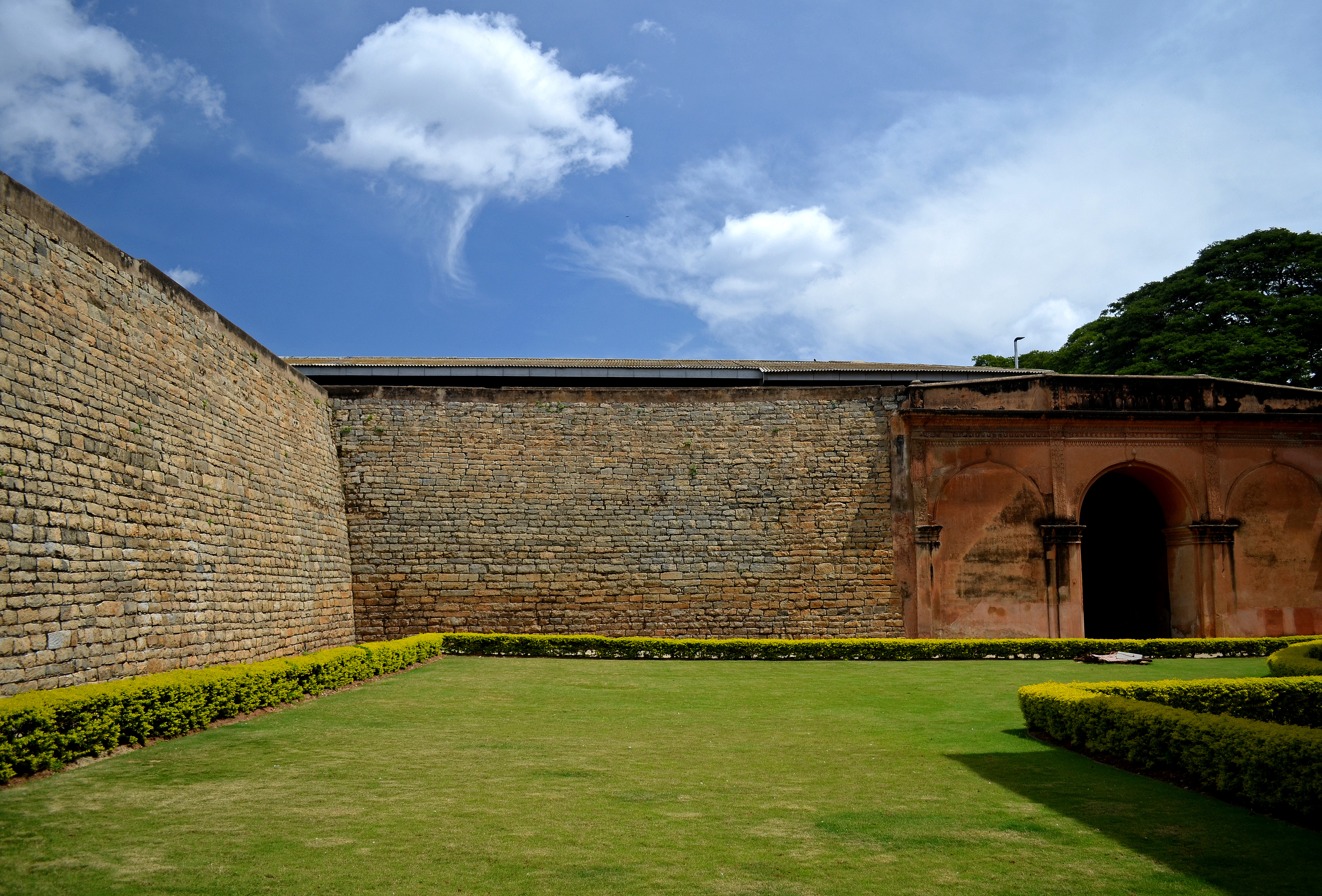
Inside the Bangalore Fort

== Sketches of James Hunter ==
James Hunter served as a lieutenant in the Royal Artillery. He was a military painter, and his sketches portrayed aspects of military and everyday life. Hunter served the British India Army and took part in Tipu Sultan Campaigns.

Hunter has sketched different landscapes of South India, including Bangalore, Mysore, Hosur, Kancheepuram, Madras, Arcot, Sriperumbudur, etc. These paintings were published in 'A Brief history of ancient and modern India embellished with coloured engravings', published by Edward Orme, London between 1802 and 1805, and 'Picturesque scenery in the Kingdom of Mysore' published by Edward Orme in 1804.

Hunter died in India in 1792. Some of his paintings of Bangalore Fort are below

Bangalore Fort

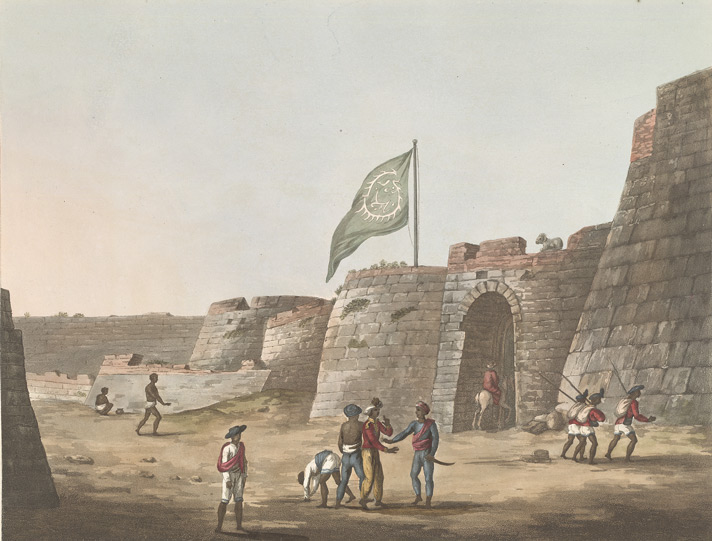
The North Entrance into The Fort of Bangalore [with Tipu's flag flying] by James Hunter (d.1792)

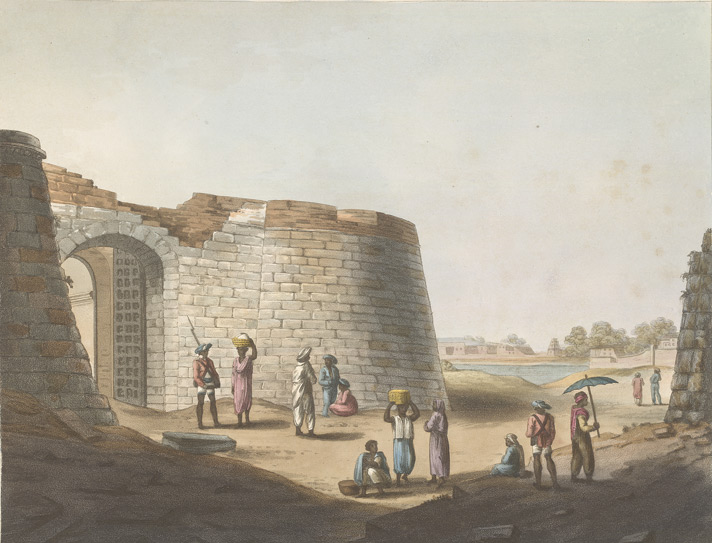
The South Entrance into The Fort of Bangalore by James Hunter (d.1792)

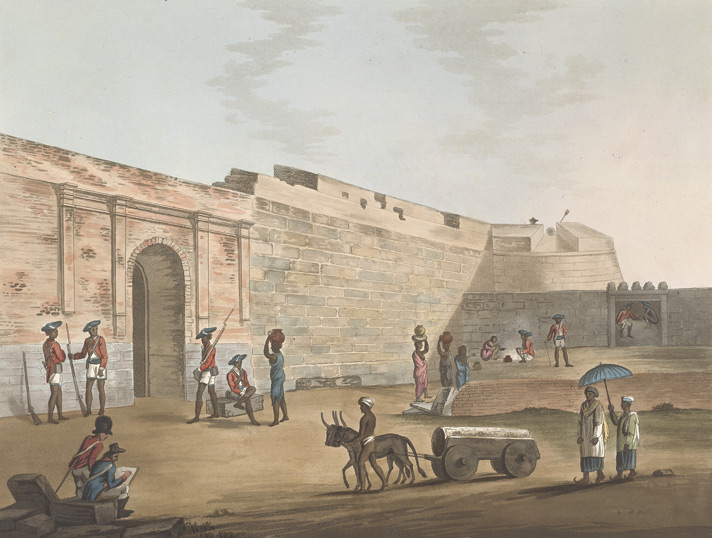
The Mysore Gate at Bangalore Fort by James Hunter (d.1792)

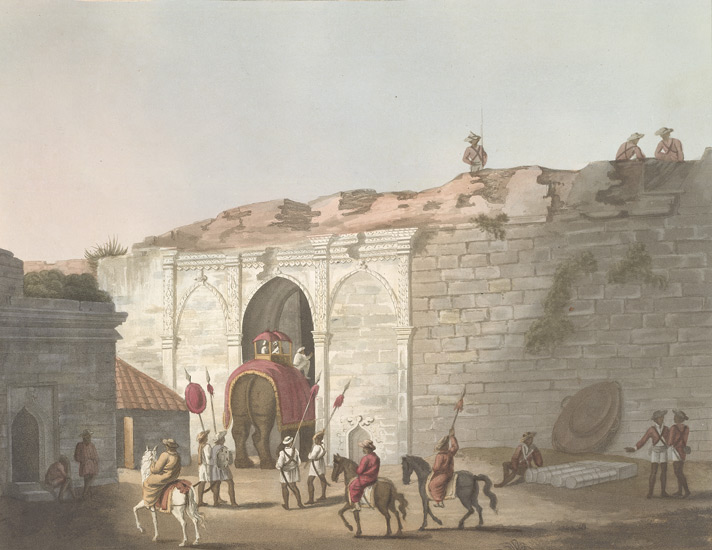
The Delhi Gate Of Bangalore by James Hunter (d.1792)

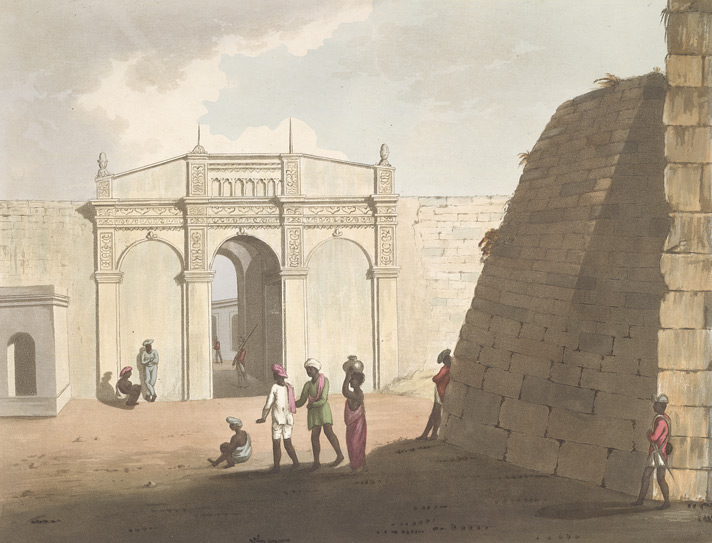
The Third Delhi Gate Of Bangalore by James Hunter (d.1792)
Tippu's Summer Palace in the Bangalore Fort

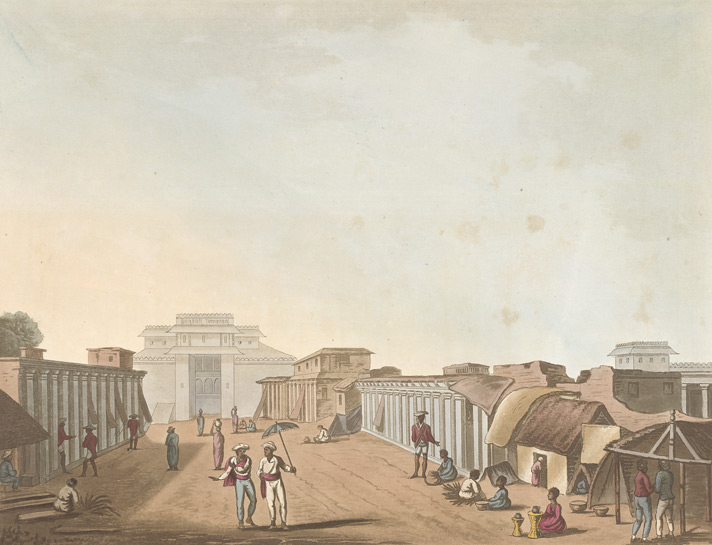
A Street Leading to the Palace Of Bangalore by James Hunter (d.1792) (the gateway in the end is on the right side of next 2 photos)

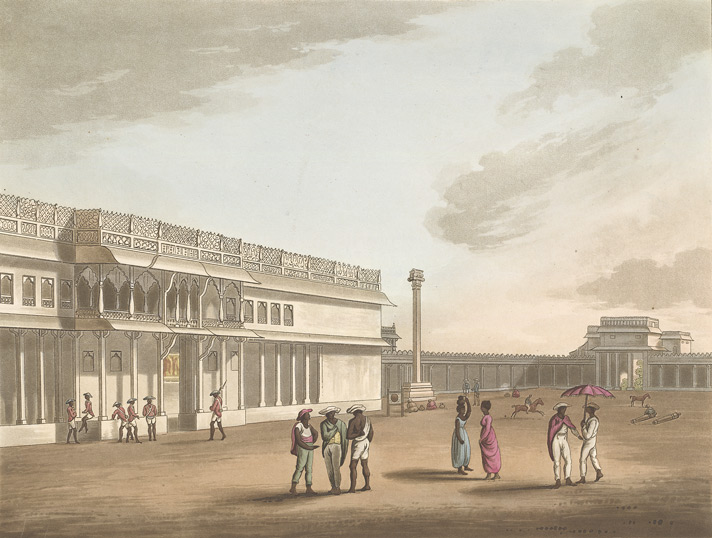
The Square And Entrance into Tippoo's Palace, Bangalore, by James Hunter (d.1792)

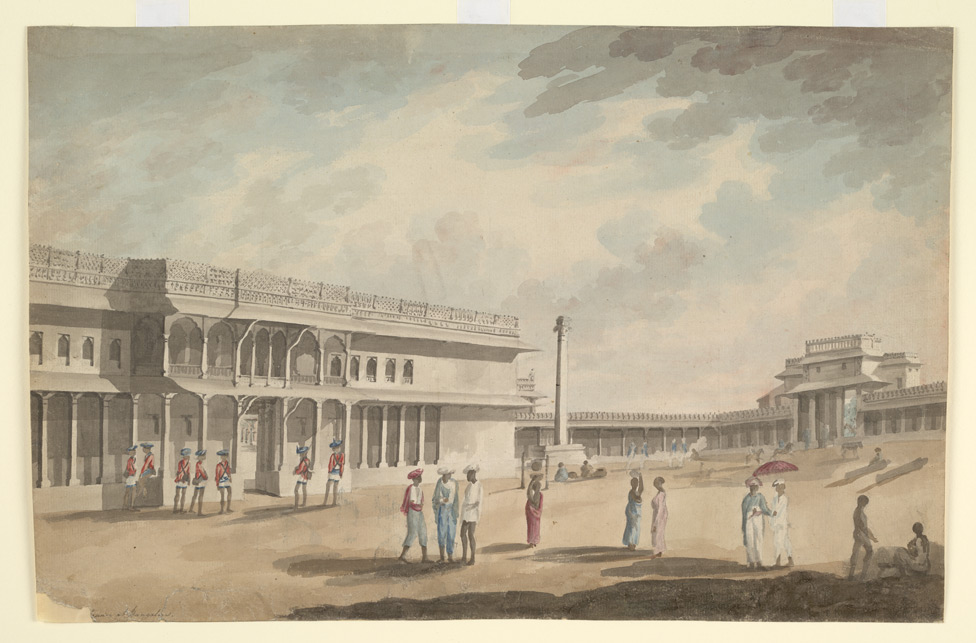
'Square at Bangalore' and 'The Entrance of Tippoo's Palace, Bangalore Feb 92, by James Hunter (d.1792)

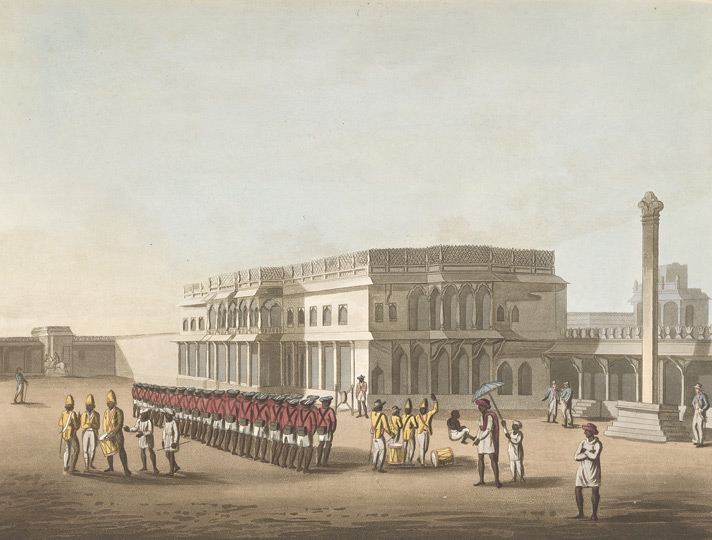
North Entrance Of Tippoo's Palace at Bangalore, by James Hunter (d.1792)

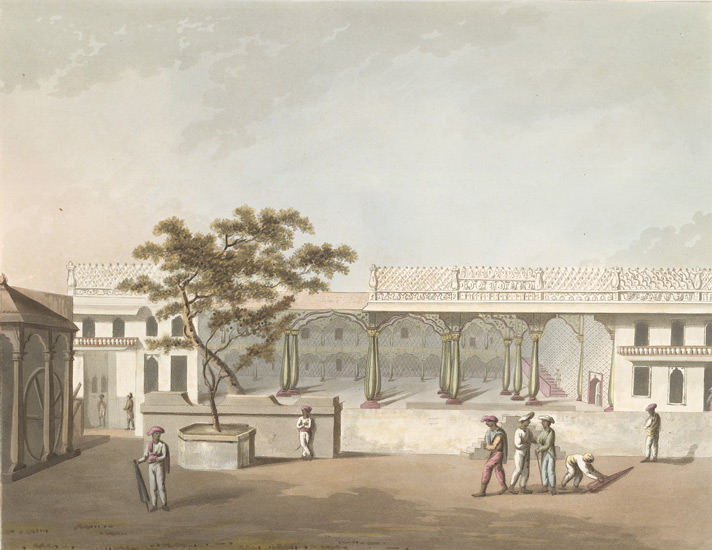
North Front Of Tippoo's Palace, Bangalore, by James Hunter (d.1792)

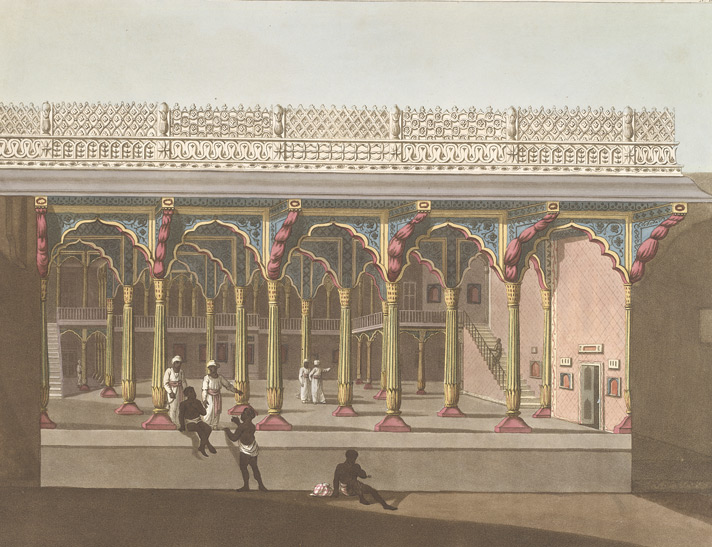
West Front Of Tippoo's Palace, Bangalore by James Hunter (d.1792)

=== Other British sketches of Bangalore Fort ===
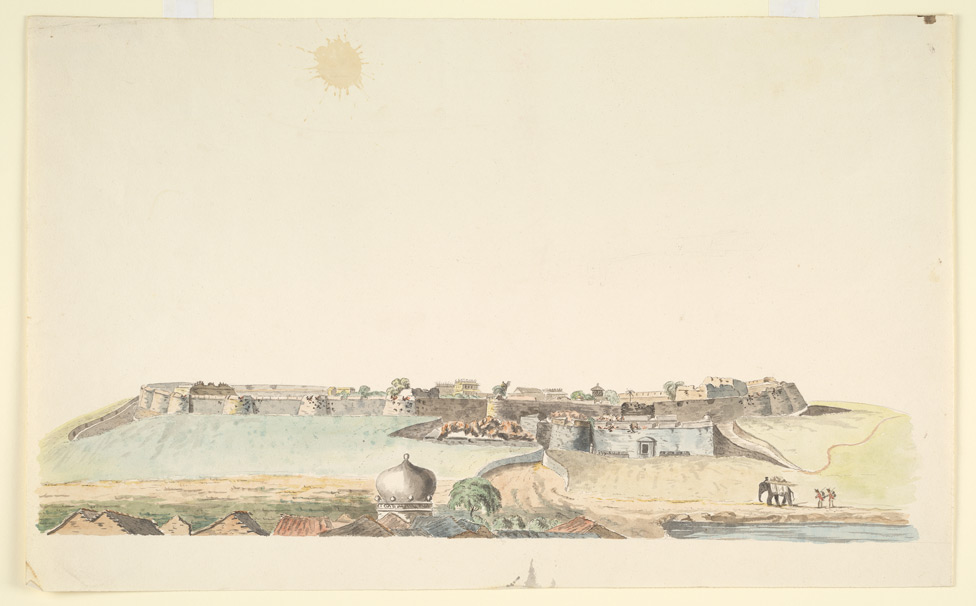
The fort of Bangalore, from a village outside the main gate, by an anonymous artist, c. 1790–1792.

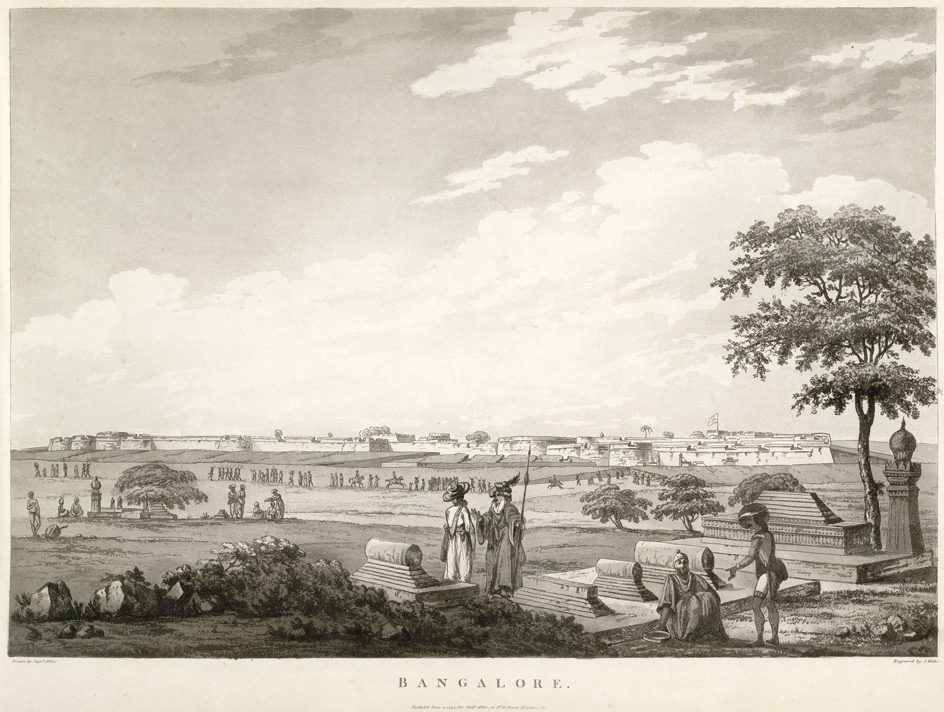
Muslim graves, around the Bangalore Fort (1974), from Alexander Allan's Views in the Mysore Country 1794

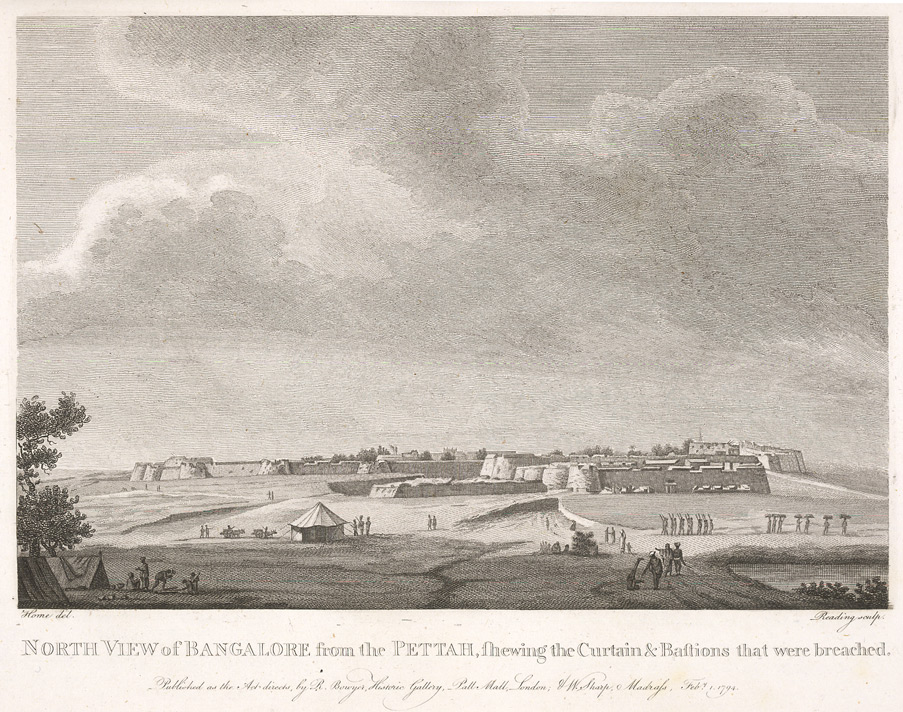
North view of Bangalore from the pettah (view from the present Avenue Road, facing Fort) shewing the curtain and bastions that were breached, by Robert Home (1752–1834)
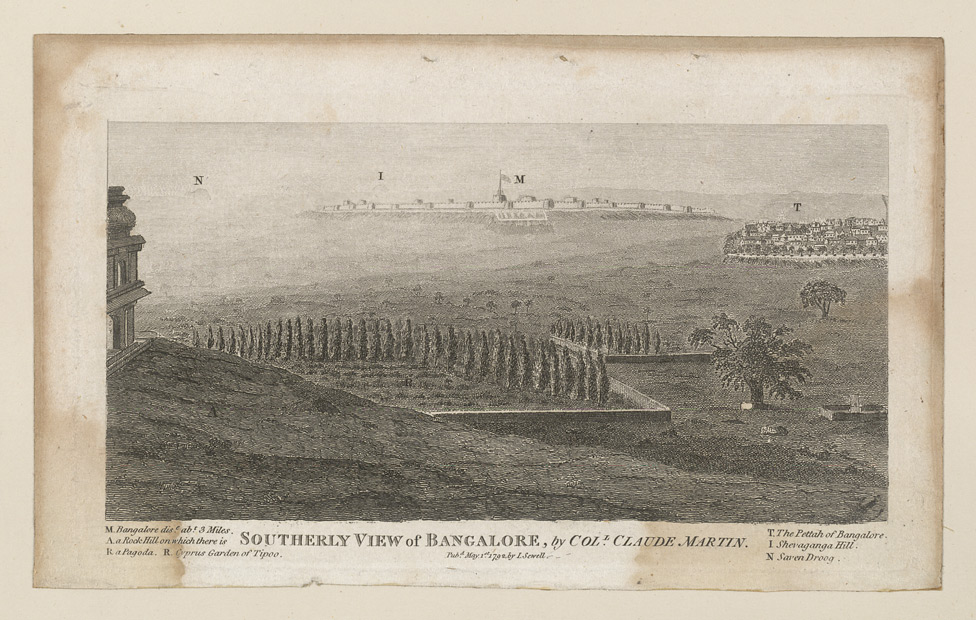
Bangalore Fort as seen from the Kempegowda Lalbagh Tower. Engraving by Claude Martin, from an earlier drawing of a southerly view of Bangalore in Karnataka, published by J. Sewell in 1792

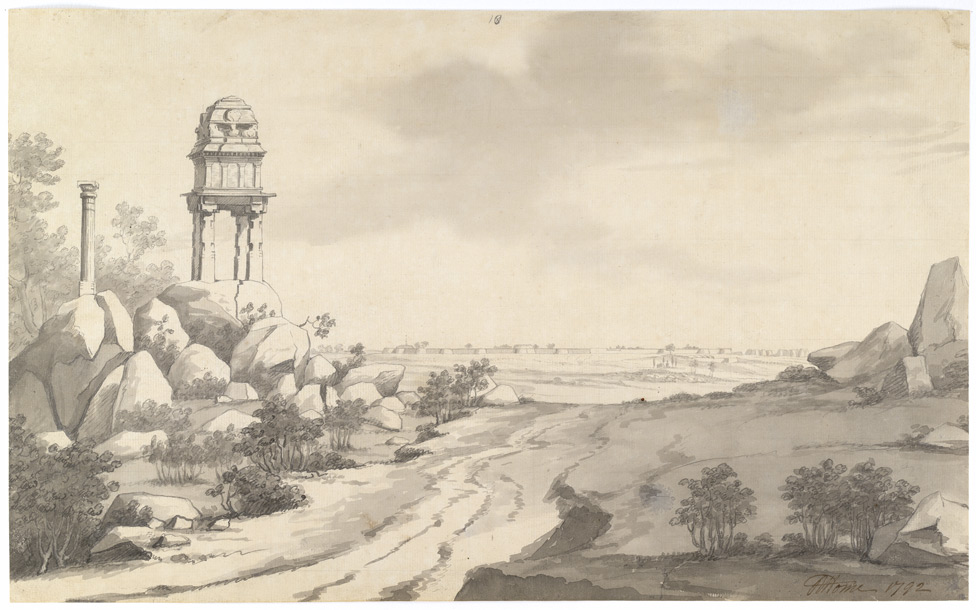
View of Bangalore Fort, from the Kempegowda South Tower. South view of Bangalore with the fortress in the distance by Robert Home (1752–1834) in 1792

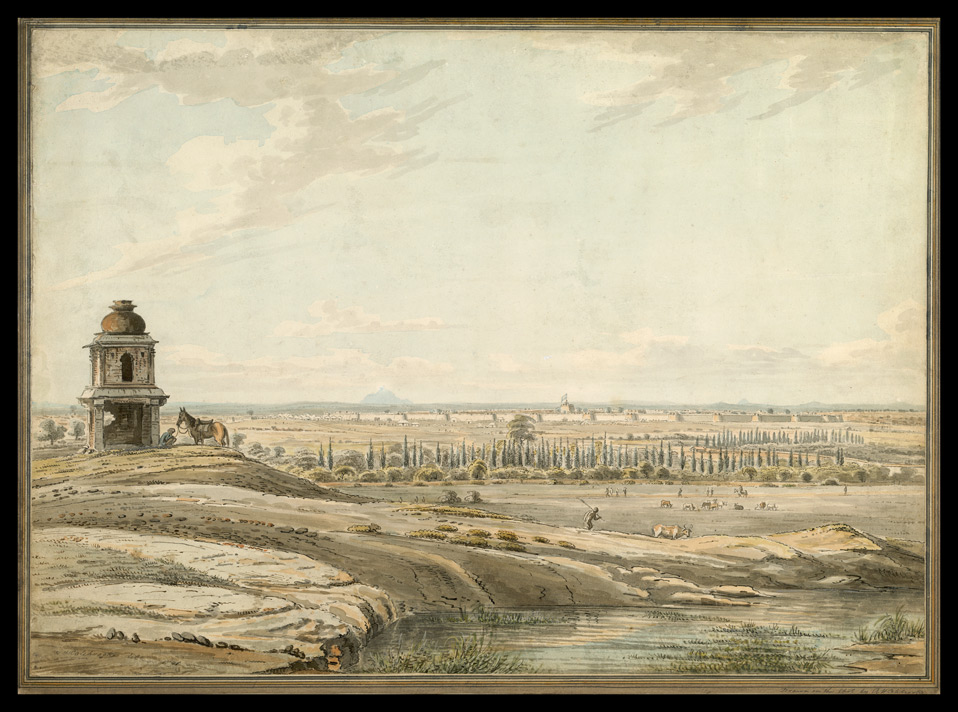
View of Bangalore Fort, from the East, with a small shrine and a dismounted horseman in the foreground, and cattle grazing beyond, by Robert Hyde Colebrooke (1762–1808) in 1791

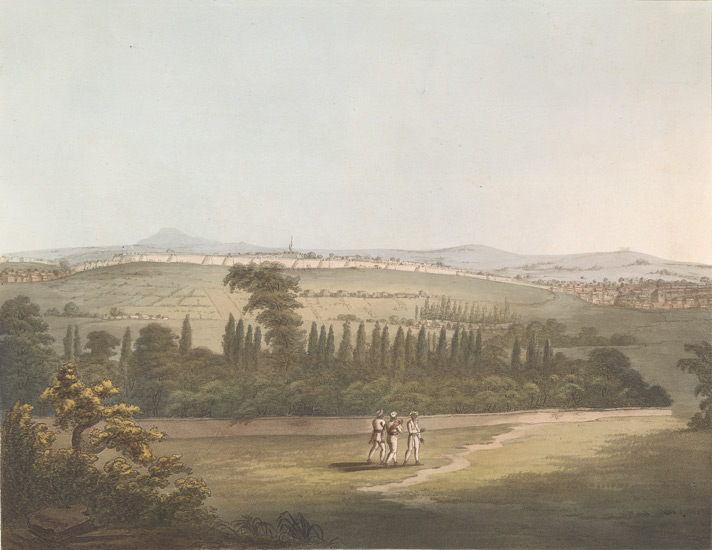
East view of Bangalore, with the cypress garden, from a pagoda, by James Hunter (d. 1792). Bangalore Fort as seen from the east (Cypress Gardens in today's Lalbagh)
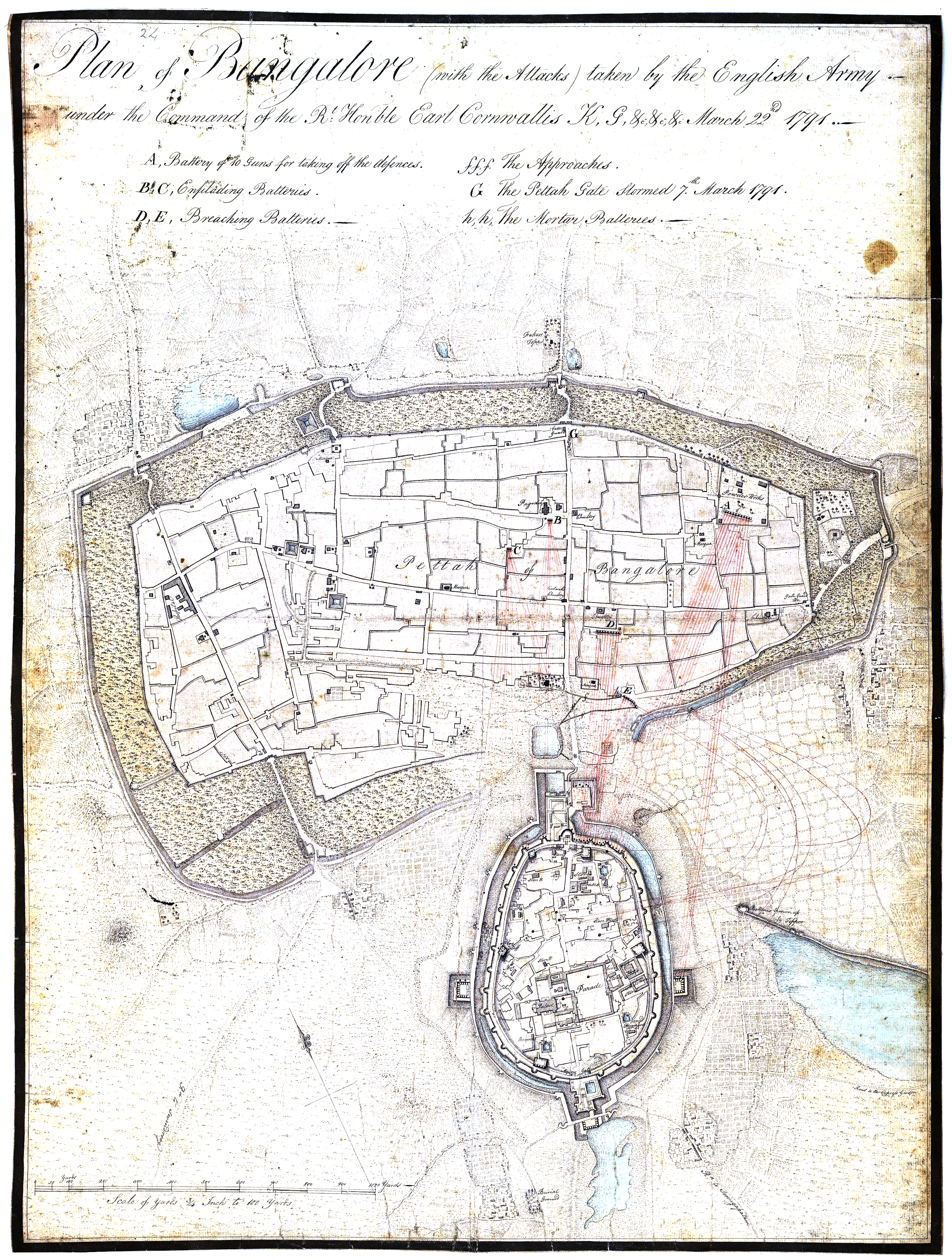
Ink wash of a plan of Bangalore by Robert Home (1752–1834) in 1791. Plan of Bangalore (with the Attacks) taken by the English Army under the Command of the Rt. Hon. Earl Cornwallis KG etc. March 22, 1791. Part of 22 drawings along with a map and three plans completed by Home, whilst accompanying the British army under Cornwallis during the 3rd Mysore War 1791–1792

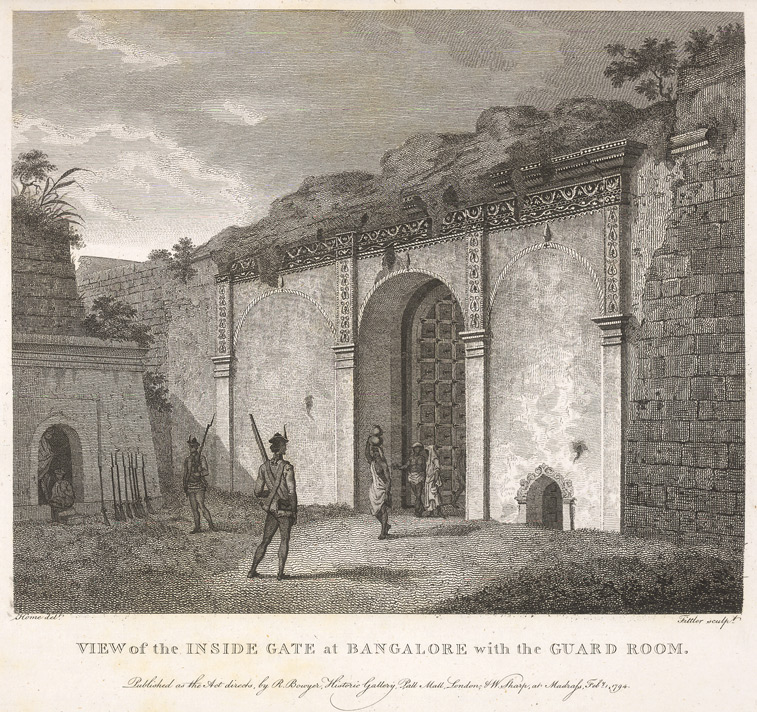
View of the inside gate at Bangalore with the guard room, by James Fittler (1758–1835) after sketches of Robert Home (1752–1834)

== Bibliography ==
- Suras Tourist Guide To Bangalore
- The African Dispersal in the Deccan: From Medieval to Modern Times
- The Penny Cyclopædia of the Society for the Diffusion of Useful ..., Volume 3
