= Fort Church, Bengaluru =

The Fort Church (St Luke's Church)
- The Fort Church, Bangalore
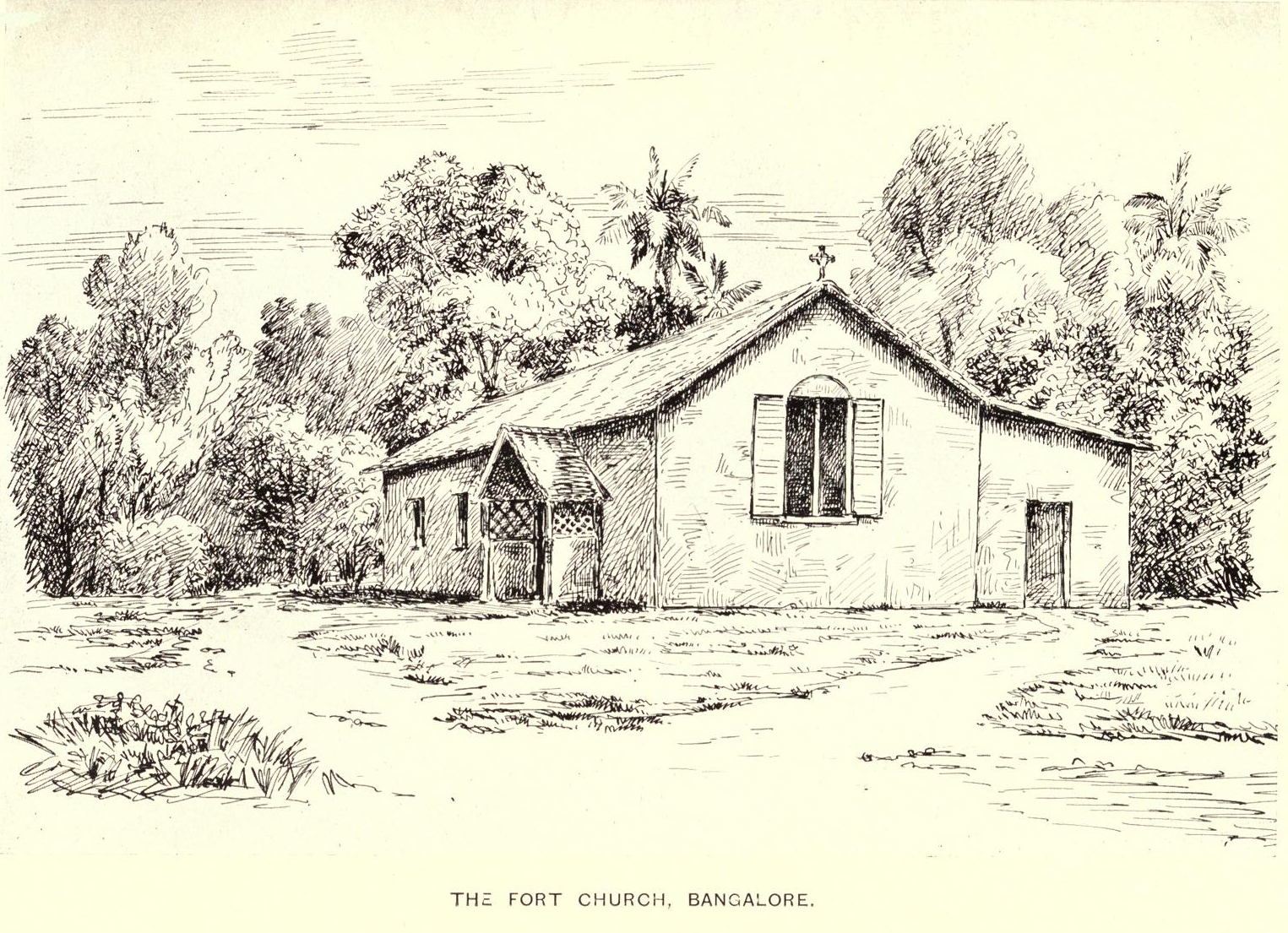
- The Fort Church (St Luke's Church)
- 12.962875°N 77.575956°E
- Location: Bangalore Fort
- Country: India
- Denomination: Anglican

History
- Former name: Drummer's Chapel
- Founded: 1808
- Founder: Lieutenant John Blakiston

Architecture
- Style: Anglican
- Completed: 1808
- Closed: 1933
- Demolished: 1933

Administration
- Diocese: Diocese of Mysore

The Fort Church, Bangalore, was a church located within Bangalore Fort. The church was demolished to make place for the construction of the Vani Vilas Hospital. The Government of Mysore then allotted land in Chamrajpet for construction of a new church, St. Luke's Church, Bangalore. Early records refer to the Fort Church as the Drummer's Chapel, constructed by British soldiers after the fall of Tippu Sultan. The Fort Church, Bangalore was the first protestant church to be raised in Bangalore.

== History ==
The Fort Church, Bangalore was among 15 churches built by the Government of Madras before 1833, when there were no special rules with regards to building churches. The Military board of the Madras Army approved the construction. The Church raised in 1807 was for the use of the British troops posted in the Bangalore Fort.

The Fort Church, Bangalore was visited by Bishop Turner, travelling from Madras to Bangalore.

The Fort Church was no longer used by 1836, when it was visited by Bishop Corrie, as there was only one chaplain for Bangalore, and he could not travel from the Bangalore Civil and Military Station to the Bangalore Fort. The church building was then used by the Madras Army for other purposes. In 1836, the army moved out of the Fort, and handed it over to the Government of Mysore

In 1857, a small garrison of the Madras Army was stationed again at the Bangalore Fort, and the Fort Church was re-opened.

== Architecture ==
The church was modest, unlike other churches in Bangalore of the period. It resembled a barrack, with a tiled roof supported by beams. The Church was referred to as the 'Little Church'.

When the Fort Church was demolished, some of the items were re-used in building St. Luke's Church, Chamrajpet. This includes the church bell, bearing the inscription 'Madras Mint 1868'.

== Fort Cemetery ==
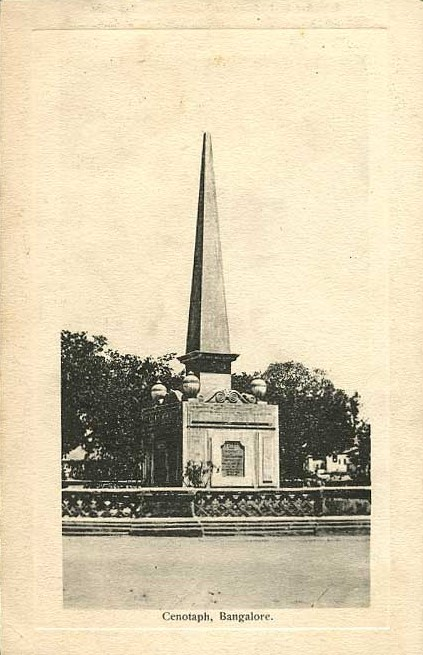
Cenotaph, Bangalore

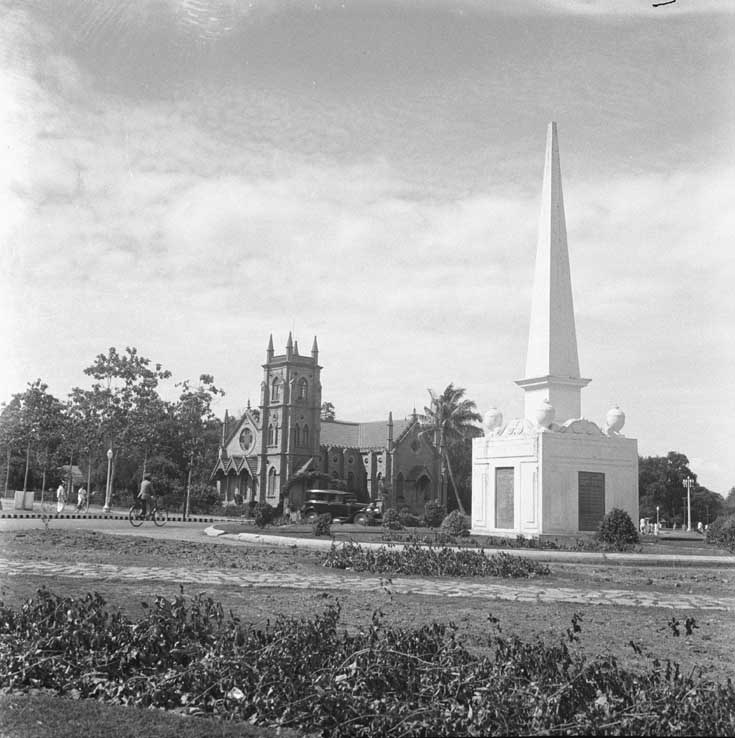
Memorial Obelisk raised for the British and Indian Officers and Men who fell in the Siege of Bangalore, 1791. The Hudson Memorial Church can be seen in the background. (The memorial was vandalised on 28 October 1964)

The Fort Cemetery, where the officers who fell in the Siege of Bangalore were buried, is illustrated in Robert Home's Book, Select Views in Mysore, the country of Tippoo Sultan, published by Robert Bowyer, London, 1794. Home's painting shows the graves of Captains James Smith, James Williamson, John Shipper, Nathaniel Daws and Jeremiah Delany, Lieutenant Conan and Lieutenant-Colonel Gratton. As recorded in 1895, The cemetery was located just outside Fort Church, with the church being responsible for its maintenance. The cemetery had cypress trees, rose bushes and flowers. The Government of Mysore, had constructed a wall and gate for the cemetery.

However, as recorded in 1912 by Rev. Frank Penny in his book The Church in Madras: Volume II, the cemetery no longer existed. The record of the officers who fell in the battle for the Bangalore Fort in 1791, were transferred to the cenotaph, raised by the Government of Mysore.

The 35 feet tall cenotaph pillar was raised in memory of the lives lost in the Siege of Bangalore, opposite to the present Corporation Building, and Hudson Memorial Church. Kannada activists led by Vatal Nagaraj and others made violent demands to demolish the cenotaph. As a result of these protests, the Bangalore City Corporation demolished the memorial on 28 October 1964, and the name of the road was also changed from Cenotaph Road to Nrupathunga Road. The engraved stones were destroyed, and not even a single stone remains. A small piece of the Cenotaph has been placed as a bench in the Corporation Office. Historians, and heritage lovers of Bangalore protested the destruction of history. A blogger, Samyuktha Harshitha, called it as 'official vandalism', comparing it with the destruction of the Bamiyan statues.

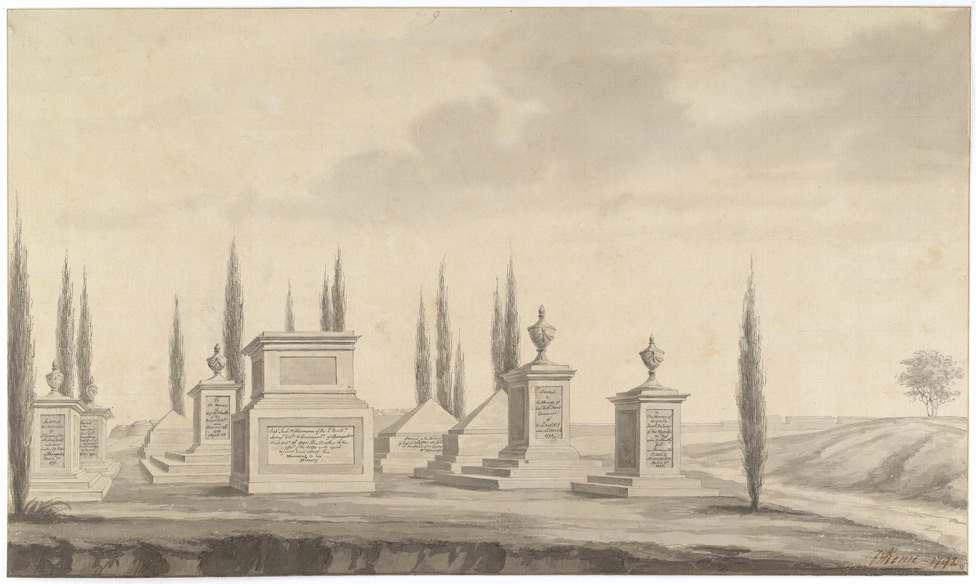
View of the burial ground at Bangalore - Select Views in Mysore, the country of Tippoo Sultan by Robert Home (1752-1834)

== Fort school ==
The Fort Church, managed the Fort School from the end of the 19th century. The church provided furniture, study maps, and managed accounts, all overseen by the Fort Church School Committee. The Diocesan Magazine, records a school function being organised for current and former students on 29 December 1909, with Miss. Rozario as head mistress (serving from 1893 to 1909), with prizes distributed by E A Hill, School inspector and Rev. G H Lamb. In 1911, the head mistress was a Miss Page, as recorded by the Diocesan Magazine.

There still exists a Fort School at Chamarajpet, with a building dating to 1907. Once called the English Vernacular School, the Fort School is located opposite Bangalore Medical College, near Tipu Sultan's Summer Palace. The School was built in 1907, and had among its students freedom fighter H S Doreswamy, cricketer G R Vishwanath, statesman V S Krishna Iyer, Mysore Maharaja Jayachamarajendra Wadiyar, former Chief Minister of Karnataka Kengal Hanumanthaiah and bureaucrat Narasimha Rao. The building is being studied by INTACH for possible renovation. The Fort School is the oldest high school in the Bangalore pete area. The school at present has 186 students in English Medium and 81 studying in Kannada Medium. Majority of the English Medium students are from Tamil and Telugu families, studying all subjects in English, English language, mother tongue language and Kannada as third language.

== Demolition ==
The Government of Mysore built Victoria Hospital in 1901, inside Bangalore Fort. In 1915, the government constructed Minto Eye Hospital on the same campus. In the 1920s the Mysore Government wanted to add a maternity hospital inside Bangalore Fort, and approached the Church of England for land on which the Fort Church was standing. The Government offered an alternative site at Hardinge Road, Chamarajpet and a compensation of INR 7,000, which was accepted by the church. The Fort Church was demolished around 1932, with the new church named as St. Luke's Church built with contributions from the Government of Mysore, Government of India, Diocese of Madras and other donors amounting to INR 36,315.
