= Bahadur Khan =

Bahadur Khan may refer to:

- Bahadur Khan (musician)
- Bahadur Khan (Mughal general)
- Bahadur Khan (politician)
