= James Hunter (military artist) =

British lieutenant in the Royal Artillery and painter

- Born: 15 November 1755
- Died: 19 May 1792 (aged 36); Vellore, Arcot, Carnatic Sultanate
- Known for: Paintings of South India
- Notable work: A Brief history of ancient and modern India embellished with coloured engravings
- Military career
- Service: British East India Company
- Rank: Lieutenant
- Unit: Royal Artillery
- Battle: Siege of Seringapatam

James Hunter (1755–1792) served as a lieutenant in the Royal Artillery in British India, serving under Marquess Cornwallis. Hunter worked as a military artist, and his sketches portray aspects of military and everyday life. Hunter took part in Tippu Sultan campaigns and other military campaigns in South India. His paintings provide a picture of late-18th-century life in South India.

Hunter has sketched different landscapes of South India, including Bangalore, Mysore, Hosur, Kancheepuram, Madras, Arcot, and Sriperumbadur. These paintings were published as the third section of A Brief history of ancient and modern India embellished with coloured engravings published by Edward Orme (London) between 1802 and 1805, as Picturesque Views in the Kingdom of Mysore published in 1804.

== James Hunter, with the Royal Artillery in India ==
In 1791, a detachment of volunteers was raised from the Royal Artillery battalions for serving in British India. Two companies were created with a major, adjutant and quarter-master, along with the men. The commanding officer was Major David Scott. Lt. James Hunter, along with Captain T. Ross and Lieutenants R. Clarke, C. Gold and W. Nicolay were the sub-ordinate officers. Leaving Woolwich in early 1791, they arrived at Madras in October 1791.

These two companies served under Lord Cornwallis in the Tippu Sultan campaigns, leading to the defeat and siege of Tippu's army at Seringapatam in 1792. Major Scott was killed on 9 February 1792, during the campaign. After a peace treaty was signed with Tippu Sultan, Lt James Hunter, with the assistance of Lt C. Gold made sketches of life in India and objects and buildings who attracted their attention. These sketches were published by C. Gold with the title Oriental Drawings and attracted much attention in England as they were considered as valuable addition to British understanding of Indian culture. Lt. Hunter died on 18 May 1791 (p. 78).

== James Hunter Memorial ==
James Hunter is buried at the Old Cemetery at Vellore, near Commissary Bazar, North Arcot District. The memorial monument raised by his brother Arthur Hunter, records his birth day as 15 November 1755 and death day as 19 May 1792. As recorded in 1946, a giant banyan tree had fallen on the memorial (pg.4).

== Views of Bangalore ==
Bangalore was first recorded in paintings in the 17th century by European artists, who travelled the South India extensively. One such artist was James Hunter, who sketched extensively on the views of Mysore and the wars with Tippu Sultan. After his death in 1792, Joseph C. Stadler, J. B. Harraden and H. Merke took up the work of 'aquatint etching' of the paintings on copper plates. Forty of Hunter's paintings were published in London in 1804, by Edward Orme, under the title Picturesque scenery in the Kingdom of Mysore. In comparison to the work of Robert Home, Lt. R. H. Colebroke Capt. Allan, Hunter's work are associated often with Tipu Sultan and his father Hyder Ali and depicts the military and civil life of Bangalore in the late 18th century.

== Sketches of Bangalore Fort ==
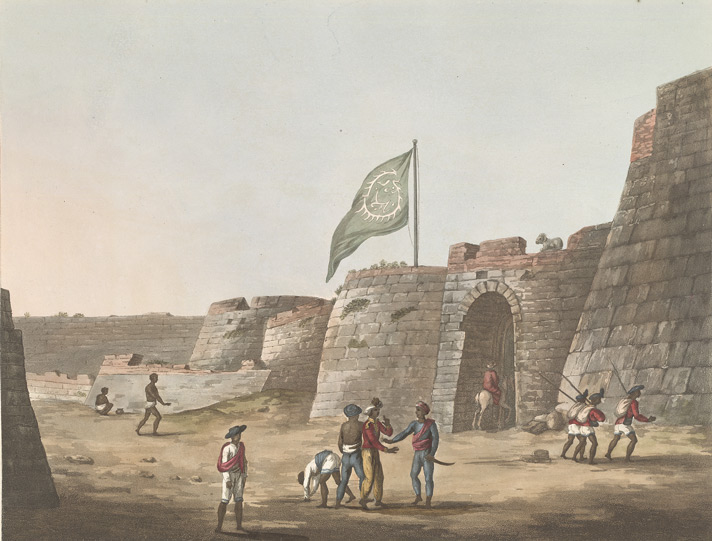
The North Entrance into The Fort of Bangalore [with Tipu's flag flying] by James Hunter (d.1792)

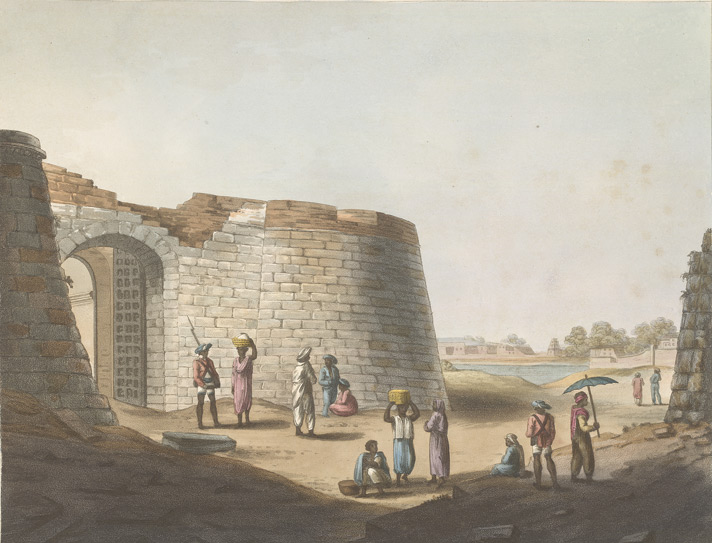
The South Entrance into The Fort of Bangalore by James Hunter (d.1792)

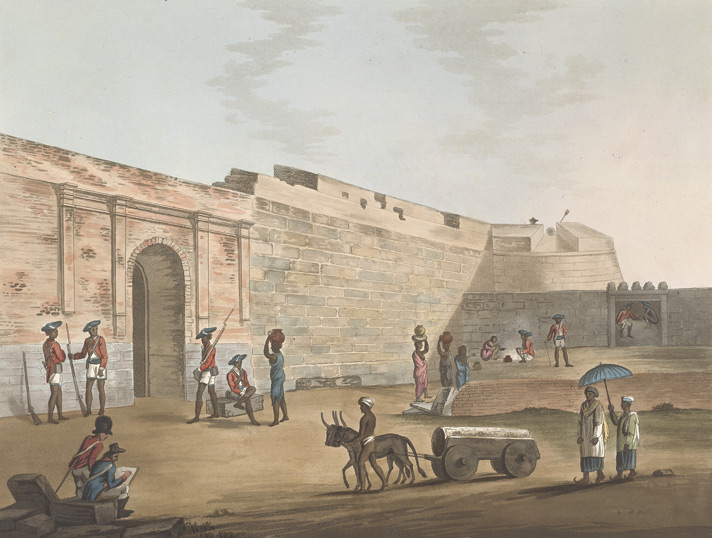
The Mysore Gate at Bangalore Fort by James Hunter (d.1792)

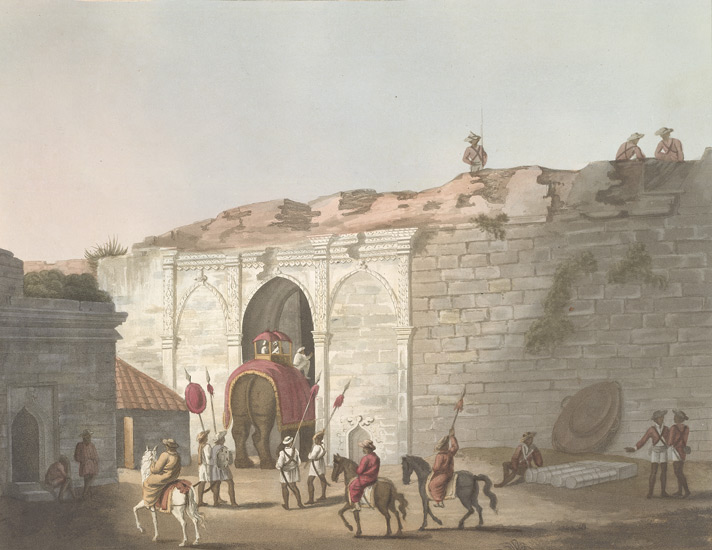
The Delhi Gate Of Bangalore by James Hunter (d.1792)

== Sketches of Tipu Summer Palace, Bangalore ==
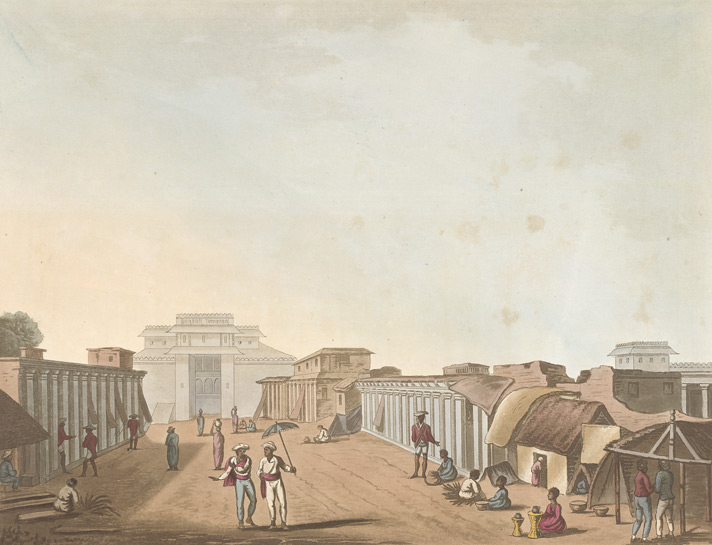
A Street Leading To The Palace Of Bangalore by James Hunter (d.1792) (the gateway in the end is on the right side of next 2 photos)

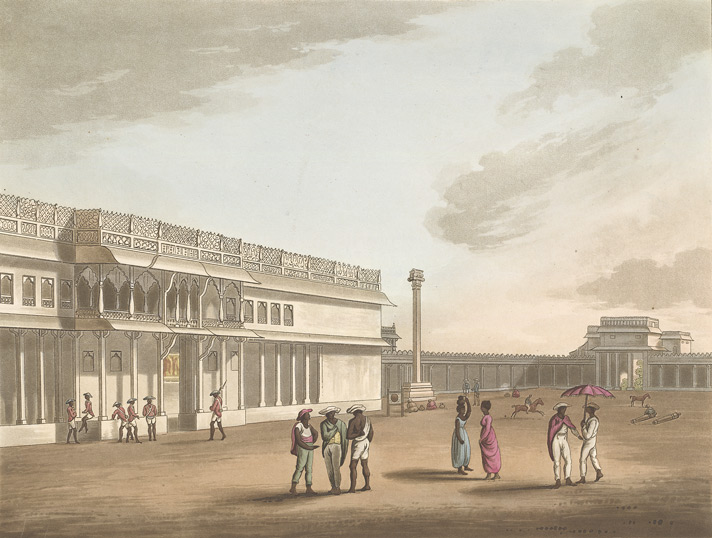
The Square And Entrance Into Tippoo's Palace, Bangalore, by James Hunter (d.1792)

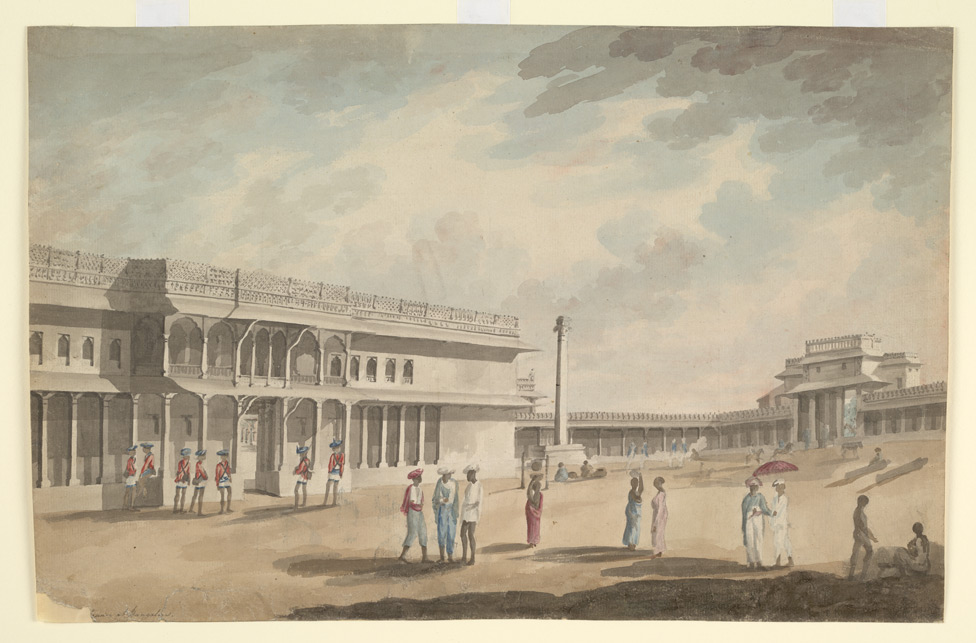
'Square at Bangalore' and 'The Entrance of Tippoo's Palace, Bangalore Feb 92, by James Hunter (d.1792)

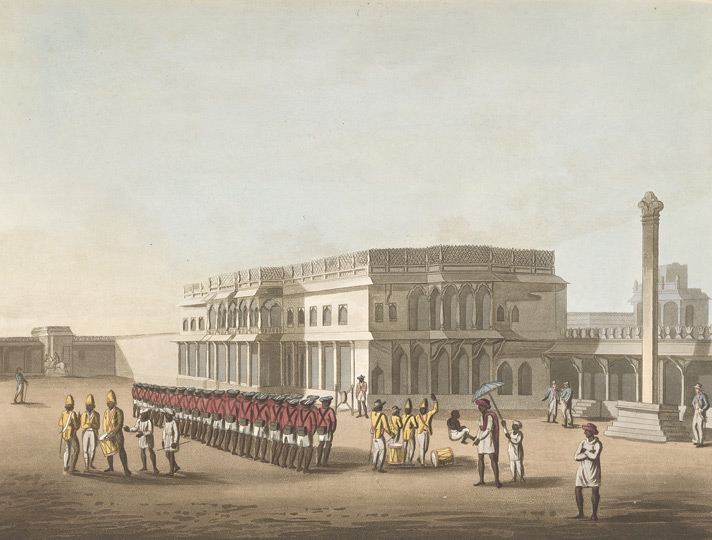
North Entrance Of Tippoo's Palace At Bangalore, by James Hunter (d.1792)

== Sketches of Hosur ==
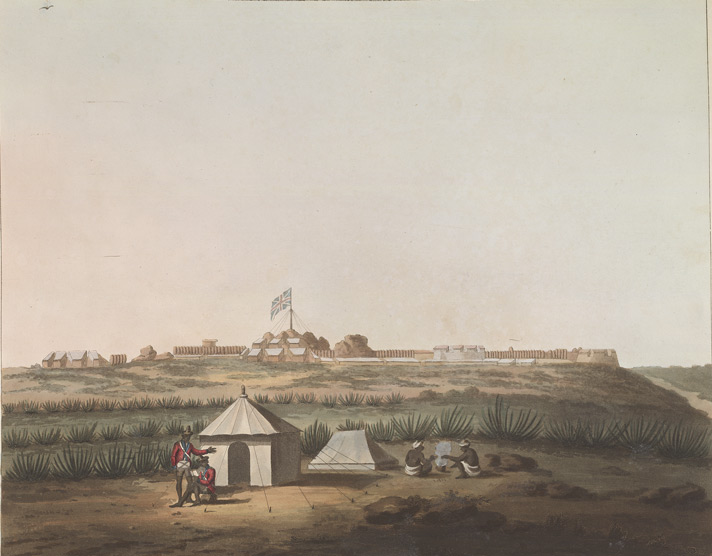
North West View of Osar by James Hunter (d.1792) (coloured in 1804)

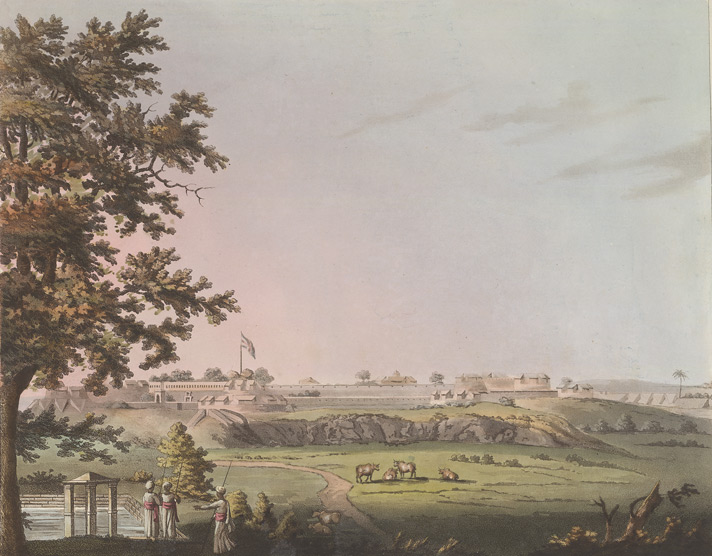
South East View of Osar by James Hunter (d.1792) (coloured in 1804)

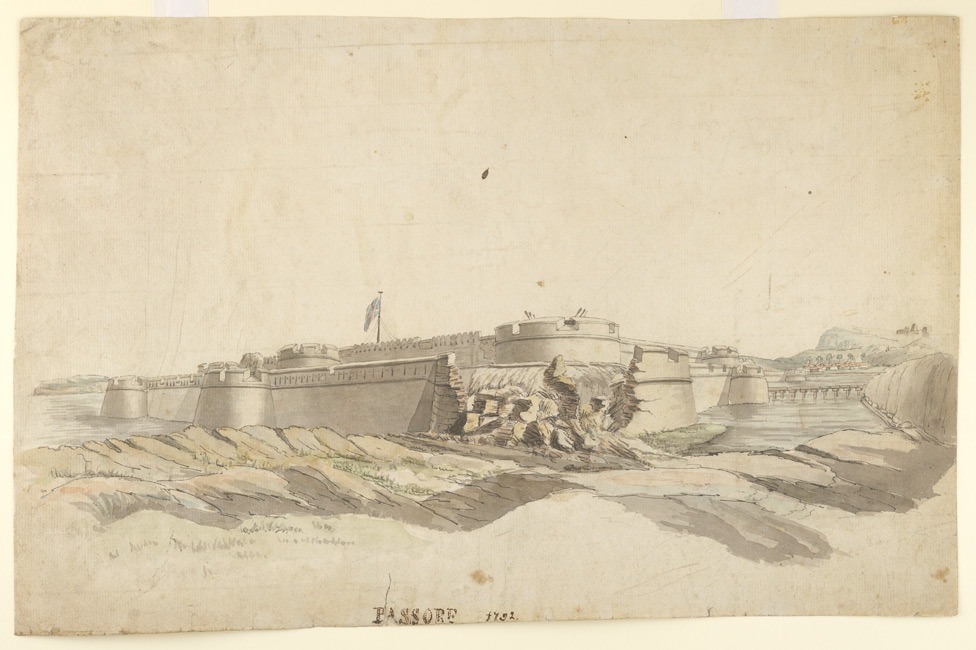
The fort of Hosur, 1792, from the south-west with breached wall and Union flag flying by James Hunter (d.1792)

== Sketches of Krishnagiri Fort ==
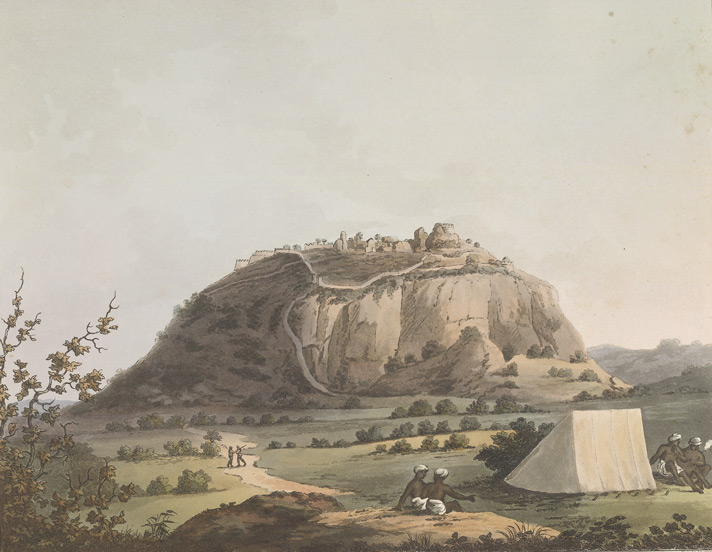
Kistnaghurry Fort, by James Hunter

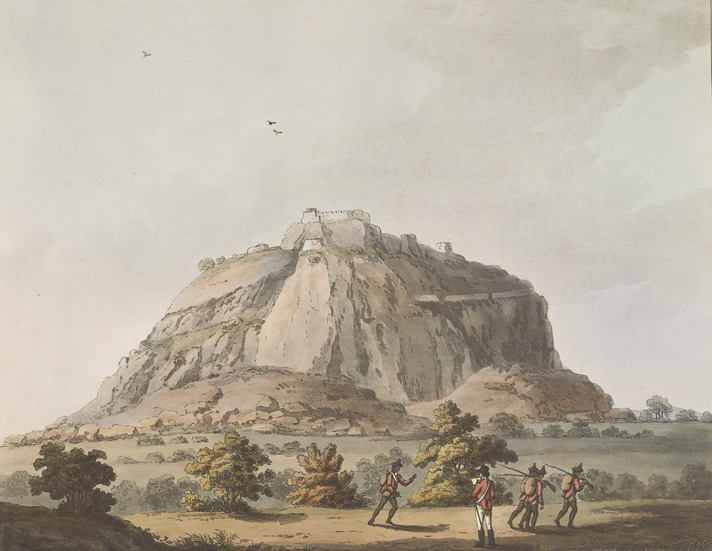
East View Of Kistnaghurry, by James Hunter
