= V. S. Krishna Iyer =

Indian politician (1922–2011)

Member of Parliament
- In office 1984–1989
- Preceded by: T. R. Shamanna
- Succeeded by: R. Gundu Rao
- Constituency: Bangalore South

Mayor of Bangalore
- In office 1962–1963

Personal details
- Born: 7 January 1922 Bangalore, Kingdom of Mysore
- Died: 25 July 2011 (aged 89) Bangalore, India
- Party: Janata Party
- Profession: Politician

V. S. Krishna Iyer (7 January 1922 – 25 July 2011) was an Indian politician and independence movement activist from the state of Karnataka. He had served as a Member of Parliament of 8th Lok Sabha for Bangalore South from 1984 to 1989.

== Career ==
Krishna also served as mayor of Bangalore and Minister in the state cabinet before being elected to Lok Sabha, the lower house of Indian Parliament from Bangalore South constituency in the 1984 Lok Sabha elections. He also served as the Deputy Chairman of the Karnataka Legislative Assembly. V.S. Krishna Iyer had occupied various posts like Mayor of Bangalore City (1962–63), MLC, Dy.Chairman M.P. of Bangalore City.

== Death ==
Krishna Iyer died on 25 July 2011 after a prolonged illness.
