= Infrastructure in Bengaluru =

Aspects of Bengaluru's infrastructure

Infrastructure in Bengaluru encompasses the civic systems — roads, water supply, sewerage, electricity, solid waste management, healthcare, and telecommunications — that underpin the functioning of India's third-largest city across its Greater Bengaluru Authority (GBA) area of 712 km². Originally established as a cantonment town under the Mysore State and later administered by the British, Bengaluru has grown into a metropolis of over 14 million people driven largely by its information technology and biotechnology industries. This growth has placed enormous and accelerating strain on infrastructure that was not designed to accommodate it. Bengaluru's built-up area rose from approximately 8 per cent of the city's land area in 1973 to 87.6 per cent by 2025, while green cover, open water bodies, and permeable surfaces declined sharply over the same period. Urban infrastructure improvement consequently stands as one of the city's foremost governance and policy challenges.

== Governance ==
Bengaluru's infrastructure was historically managed by the Bruhat Bengaluru Mahanagara Palike (BBMP), formed in 2007 by merging the old Bangalore Mahanagara Palike with seven surrounding city municipal councils. At its peak, the BBMP governed 243 wards across 712 km² with a population of over 12 million — making it one of the largest municipalities in the world by area and population. By the mid-2010s, it had become apparent that the BBMP was structurally incapable of delivering effective urban services at this scale. BBMP elections had not been held since 2020, meaning the city was governed by appointed administrators rather than elected councillors for five consecutive years. The BBMP Restructuring Committee had proposed a three-tier governance model as early as 2015, but the recommendation lay dormant for nearly a decade.

The Greater Bengaluru Governance Act, 2024 (Karnataka Act No. 36 of 2025), introduced in the Karnataka Legislative Assembly on 23 July 2024 and brought into force on 23 April 2025, established the Greater Bengaluru Authority (GBA) as the apex metropolitan governance body. The GBA officially replaced the BBMP on 15 May 2025; the BBMP itself was formally dissolved on 2 September 2025 after completing the administrative transition.

The GBA is structured in three tiers. At the apex is the Authority itself, chaired ex officio by the Chief Minister of Karnataka with the Minister for Bengaluru Development as Vice-Chairperson. Below it are five newly constituted city corporations — Bengaluru Central, Bengaluru North, Bengaluru South, Bengaluru East, and Bengaluru West — each with its own elected mayor and deputy mayor serving 30-month terms, improved from the previous one-year term. Below the corporations are ward committees, with 369 wards delimited and notified by 19 November 2025 — an increase from the previous 243 wards intended to bring governance closer to residents. Each corporation has been divided into two administrative zones, giving the city ten zones in total. Corporation elections are expected in mid-2026, which will restore elected local governance to Bengaluru for the first time since 2020.

The GBA serves as the Planning Authority for the entire 712 km² metropolitan area, responsible for preparing and enforcing the Master Plan and strategic spatial development plans. It coordinates and supervises the parastatals under its umbrella — the Bangalore Development Authority (BDA), Bangalore Water Supply and Sewerage Board (BWSSB), BESCOM, Bangalore Metropolitan Transport Corporation (BMTC), and Bangalore Metro Rail Corporation Limited (BMRCL) — and reviews major infrastructure projects that cross corporation boundaries. The Act provides for the GBA to establish up to seven corporations within its jurisdiction; the initial implementation began with five. An August 2025 amendment to the Act confirmed that corporation elections and municipal autonomy are fully protected under the 74th Constitutional Amendment.

The Bangalore Development Authority (BDA) retains jurisdiction over the peripheral 582 km² outside the GBA's city area, with its mandate now focused on large-scale arterial infrastructure and land development. The Bengaluru Metropolitan Region Development Authority (BMRDA) continues to coordinate planning at the broader metropolitan region level, encompassing Bengaluru Urban, Bengaluru North, and Bengaluru South districts.

== History of city planning ==
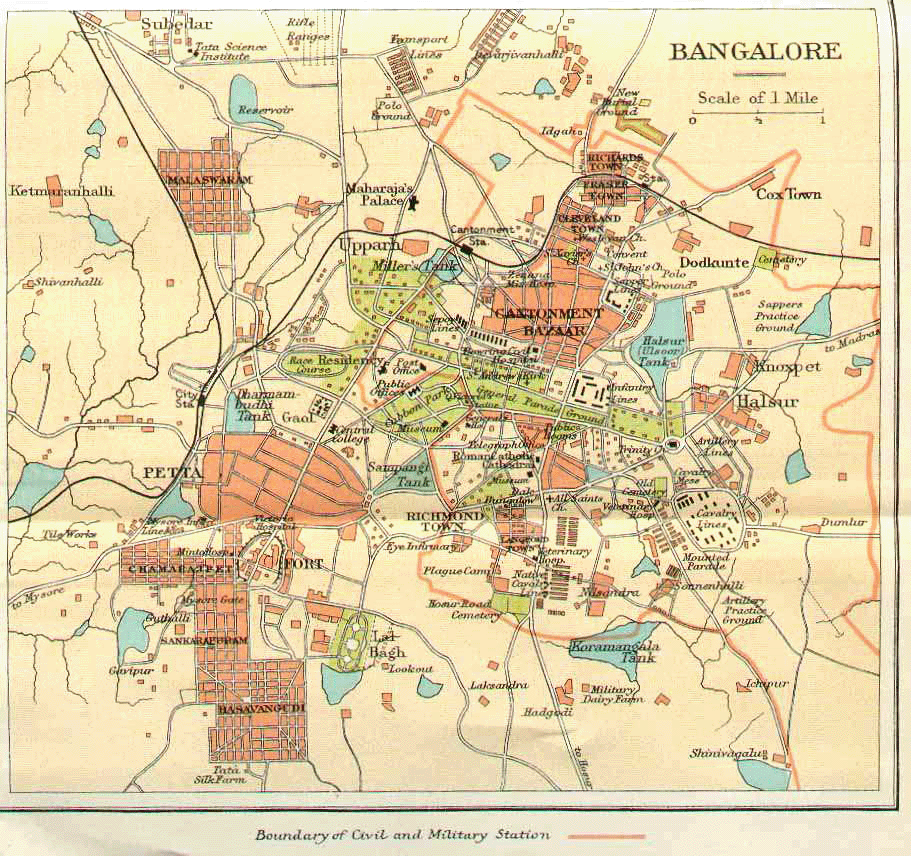
A 1924 map of Bangalore showing the major roads and localities of the Bangalore pete and the Bangalore Cantonment.

Bengaluru was founded in 1537 by Kempe Gowda I, a vassal of the Vijayanagara Empire, who built a mud fort and divided the town within it into petes (localities) for different artisans and traders, with markets organised by commodity. The town had two main streets — Chikpete and Dodpete — whose intersection, Dodpete Square, formed the commercial heart of early Bengaluru. The town was enclosed by nine gates; the four main gates were at Halasuru (east), Sondekoppa (west), Yelahanka (north), and Anekal (south). Kempe Gowda I also sanctioned the construction of lakes within the landlocked city as a primary source of water supply — the origin of the interlocking lake system that would define the city's ecology for centuries. The city's residential areas developed further under Kempe Gowda II, who built four towers to demarcate Bengaluru's boundaries, located in what are today Lal Bagh, Kempambudhi Tank, Ulsoor Lake, and the vicinity of the Ramana Maharshi Ashram.

Hyder Ali took possession of Bengaluru in 1758 and strengthened the fort with stone walls. His son Tipu Sultan continued its development, including the establishment of the Lal Bagh botanical garden. After the city was captured by the British following the Fourth Anglo-Mysore War in 1799, the Diwan of Mysore Purnaiah oversaw infrastructure improvements between 1799 and 1811, renovating the fort temple and establishing a choultry for travellers. The British moved their garrison from Srirangapatna to Bengaluru in 1831, establishing the Bangalore Cantonment. Commissioner Sir Mark Cubbon (1834–1861) introduced Kannada as the official language, sanctioned road and bridge construction, and established the telegraph system. The first railway line between Bengaluru and Jolarpet was laid in 1864 under his directives. His successor Lewin Bentham Bowring (1862–1870) established the sewerage system and organised law enforcement.

The Town Municipality of Bangalore was constituted in 1862, and a parallel municipality was established in the Cantonment the same year. Despite the establishment of these bodies, civic conditions remained poor — uncovered drains up to ten feet deep were common, and waste removal was largely outsourced to contractors with limited efficacy. The bubonic plague outbreak of 1897–98 forced dramatic improvements in public health and sanitation infrastructure, with telephone lines laid for coordination and hundreds of unsanitary buildings demolished.

To relieve congestion, new residential extensions — Malleswaram and Basavanagudi — were formed in the late 19th century, with new roads linking them to the older town. Avenue Road became the commercial hub of the city, and several circles and roads were named in honour of Mysore royalty and civic figures. In 1905, Bengaluru became one of the first cities in Asia to receive electricity, powered by the Shivanasamudra hydroelectric plant. After Indian independence in 1947, the two municipalities of the cantonment and Bangalore town were united under the Bangalore Municipal Corporation Act LXIX (1949) to form the Bangalore City Corporation (BCC), with 50 wards and 75 councillors. The first municipal elections under adult franchise were held in December 1950. The BDA Act of 1976 reconstituted the City Improvement Trust Board to form the Bangalore Development Authority (BDA), charged with planned metropolitan development.

== Roads ==
Bengaluru's road network spans approximately 10,200 km, yielding a road density of 8.2 km per square kilometre — significantly lower than Delhi's and structurally insufficient for the city's vehicle fleet, which reached 1.23 crore registered vehicles by March 2025, with approximately 2,000 new vehicles added each day. Vehicle density has reached 823 vehicles per kilometre of road. Mahadevapura and Whitefield zones in East Bengaluru experience the highest congestion, and the IT corridor on the Outer Ring Road is among the most congested stretches in India.

The main arterial roads entering the city include Bellary Road (north), Tumkur Road and Mysore Road (west), Kanakapura Road, Bannerghatta Road, and Hosur Road (south), and Old Madras Road (east). Many of Bengaluru's colonial-era streets were widened into commercial corridors after independence. M.G. Road, Commercial Street, and Brigade Road became major shopping and corporate areas, while B.V.K. Iyengar Road remains a retail hub. The city's road network is mainly radial, converging at the city centre, supplemented by ring roads and planned expressways.

Road safety is a serious concern. Fatal road crashes reached a 16-year high in 2023, with 894 crashes resulting in 921 deaths. Pedestrians, motorcyclists, and cyclists together accounted for 91 per cent of those fatalities. Fatalities declined modestly in 2024 to 893 deaths across 4,784 crashes — a 3.97 per cent reduction — attributed partly to blackspot rectification works and stricter enforcement by the Bengaluru City Traffic Police (BTP).

=== Ring roads and expressways ===
The Outer Ring Road (ORR), developed by the BDA between 1996 and 2002 as a 60-kilometre ring road to remove heavy vehicles from downtown Bengaluru, has since become the backbone of the city's IT economy, with major technology parks concentrated along its eastern arc between Marathahalli and Electronic City. The GBA unveiled a ₹450-crore redevelopment blueprint for the ORR corridor in 2025, encompassing road widening, junction redesign, bus priority lanes, and pedestrian infrastructure.

The Bengaluru Business Corridor (BBC), formerly the Peripheral Ring Road (PRR) before rebranding in January 2024, is a proposed 8-lane, 100-metre-wide access-controlled greenfield expressway of approximately 73.5 km connecting Tumkur Road in the north-west to Hosur Road in the south-east via Bellary Road, Old Madras Road, and Sarjapur Road. Stalled for over two decades due to land acquisition disputes, the project has a revised completion target of December 2027, though as of mid-2026 no concessionaire had been finalised and land acquisition remained incomplete. A proposed extension — PRR-2 — would add a 30-kilometre connector from Hosur Road to Mysore Road via Bannerghatta and Kanakapura Road. The Satellite Town Ring Road (STRR), spanning over 280 km, was partially inaugurated by Prime Minister Narendra Modi in March 2024 and is planned to connect 12 satellite towns including Doddaballapur, Hosur, and Anekal into a single peripheral corridor.

The BTP master plan submitted to the GBA in April 2026 proposed 35 new flyovers, 25 underpasses, and 101 skywalks, with a focus on making 25 major junctions signal-free — including Hebbal, Sarakki Circle, and Dalmia Junction on Bannerghatta Road. East Bengaluru was identified as the highest-priority zone for grade separation works. The Karnataka government has also proposed 150 km of flyovers and elevated corridors across the city, though Bengaluru has a documented history of infrastructure projects stalling mid-construction due to funding disruptions linked to electoral cycles.

=== B-SMILE and tunnel roads ===
Bengaluru Smart Infrastructure Limited (B-SMILE) is a special-purpose vehicle established by the Karnataka government in May 2025 with an initial investment of ₹7,000 crore (90% state equity, 10% from the GBA's predecessor BBMP) to implement large-scale urban infrastructure projects. B-SMILE is designed to attract private co-investment alongside state equity, enabling it to execute projects beyond the capacity of the municipal corporations. Its primary initial project is an 18-kilometre twin-tube tunnel road connecting Hebbal in the north to Silk Board in the south — a north–south vehicular corridor beneath the city — approved by the Karnataka Cabinet in August 2024 at an estimated cost of ₹12,690 crore. A parallel east–west tunnel from KR Puram to Mysore Road is in planning, forming part of a proposed 170-kilometre tunnel network.

The tunnel road project has attracted significant controversy. Mobility experts argue that it primarily serves private car users, since two-wheelers and three-wheelers — which together constitute the majority of Bengaluru's vehicle fleet — are excluded. Critics contend that this contradicts Bengaluru's Comprehensive Mobility Plan (2020), which set a target of 73 per cent of motorised trips being served by public transport. Multiple public interest litigations have been filed before the Karnataka High Court, and civic groups have approached the National Green Tribunal over the tunnel's proposed path beneath Lal Bagh botanical garden.

== Water supply ==
Water supply to Bengaluru is managed by the Bangalore Water Supply and Sewerage Board (BWSSB), established in 1964. The BWSSB's jurisdiction covers the entire 800 km² of the former BBMP area — the core city of 245 km², eight urban local bodies covering 330 km², and 110 villages covering 225 km².

The primary source of Bengaluru's water supply is the Cauvery River, with the city's allocation fixed at 24 thousand million cubic feet (TMC) by Supreme Court order. The BWSSB currently extracts 1,460 million litres per day (MLD) of Cauvery water — roughly 56 per cent of the city's estimated daily requirement of approximately 2,600 MLD. Groundwater from private bore wells supplies approximately 40 per cent of the city's daily demand, while the remaining deficit is met through water tankers at significant cost to consumers.

=== The 2024 water crisis and groundwater depletion ===
Bengaluru experienced its most severe water crisis in recorded history in early 2024, triggered by a combination of below-average monsoon rainfall in 2023 (Bengaluru received only 24 mm of rain in August 2023, an 80 per cent deficit against the monthly average and the lowest since at least 1971) and the accelerating depletion of the city's aquifer. Groundwater levels on the city's outskirts dropped by 10–15 metres during the 2024 summer; in eastern and northern Bengaluru they fell by 20–25 metres in some locations. The Central Ground Water Board's 2023 assessment found that all groundwater units in Bangalore Urban and Bangalore Rural districts are over-exploited — meaning annual extraction exceeds annual recharge in every assessed unit.

Bengaluru has approximately 40 million bore wells and open wells across Karnataka, and in areas such as KR Puram, Whitefield, RT Nagar, and JP Nagar, bore wells are sunk to depths of up to 1,500 feet. Research by the Central Ground Water Board found that 81 per cent of groundwater samples from rural Bengaluru had nitrate levels above permissible limits, and 60 per cent had uranium levels above permissible limits. The BWSSB, in collaboration with the Indian Institute of Science (IISc), is urging apartment residents to switch from bore wells to Cauvery water connections and has implemented mandatory online approvals before new bore wells may be drilled. Over 2.5 lakh groundwater recharge wells have been built in Bengaluru, led by civil society organisations, to partially offset aquifer depletion.

Distribution losses — from leakage, theft, and metering errors — have been reduced from approximately 49 per cent to 27 per cent following pipeline replacement works, according to BWSSB. Of the estimated 2,000 MLD of wastewater generated by the city, only approximately 655 MLD (32 per cent) is reused, representing a significant untapped resource. The BWSSB has established a web portal to facilitate treated water sales to industry and commercial users, though uptake has been limited.

=== Cauvery Water Supply Scheme ===
Water supply has been progressively augmented through five completed stages of the Cauvery Water Supply Scheme (CWSS), with a sixth under preparation:

Stage	Description	Status
Stage I	Original city core	Operational
Stage II	Extension to additional localities	Operational
Stage III	Areas incorporated in the 1980s expansion	Operational
Stage IV (Phases I & II)	BBMP peripheral areas	Operational
Stage V	110 villages and outer areas incorporated in the 2007 BBMP expansion; target of 3 lakh new connections; 16 Cauvery Connect Centres established in villages	Ongoing (89,000 connections completed as of May 2025)
Stage VI	Additional 500 MLD; estimated cost ₹6,939 crore; planned to draw water upstream of the KRS Reservoir using the service lane of the Bengaluru–Mysuru expressway	DPR completed; construction pending

The city is also adding 26 new sewage treatment plants (STPs) by June 2026, which will bring total treated water generation capacity to approximately 2,200 MLD, helping reduce the volume of untreated sewage entering water bodies. An IISc report identified 80 critical wards at severe risk of water scarcity — many in areas nominally covered by earlier CWSS stages — where residents remain dependent on private bore wells.

=== Sewerage ===
The BWSSB's sewerage system follows the city's topography along three principal valleys — Vrishabhavathi, Koramangala–Challaghatta, and Hebbal — and five minor valleys, allowing largely gravity-fed flow. As of March 2026, Bengaluru generates an estimated 1,480 MLD of sewage daily and is served by 34 STPs with a total installed capacity of 1,348.5 MLD, of which 1,212.7 MLD is being treated — indicating a gap between sewage generation and treatment capacity. The BWSSB is rehabilitating 20 of its 34 STPs to integrate advanced tertiary treatment technologies and meet revised NGT environmental standards (BOD reduced from 20 mg/l to 10 mg/l; COD from 250 mg/l to 50 mg/l).

Bengaluru has the largest number of decentralised STPs in the world — approximately 2,700 on-site plants in apartment complexes and commercial buildings, with a combined capacity of over 615 MLD. Of the wastewater treated by both centralised and decentralised STPs, nearly 720 million litres per day remains unused — a substantial resource that could substitute for freshwater in non-potable uses such as irrigation, toilet flushing, and industrial cooling. The BWSSB has set a target of recycling a larger share of this treated water to reduce the city's dependence on Cauvery withdrawals and bore wells.

== Electricity ==
Electricity distribution in Bengaluru is managed by the Bangalore Electricity Supply Company Limited (BESCOM), constituted following the Karnataka Electricity Reforms Act of 1999, which corporatised the former Karnataka Electricity Board (KEB, established 1957) and unbundled generation, transmission, and distribution functions. BESCOM's jurisdiction spans Bengaluru Urban, Rural, Ramanagara, Tumkur, Kolar, Chikkaballapur, and Chitradurga districts, serving approximately 2.9 crore consumers. Bengaluru city represents the bulk of its consumer base and revenue.

=== Energy demand and reliability ===
BESCOM's peak demand reached approximately 7,500 MW in 2025, driven by rapid urbanisation, the dramatic growth of data centres supporting Bengaluru's IT sector, and rising air-conditioning loads associated with the urban heat island effect. Power cuts in the city arise primarily from scheduled maintenance, transformer failures, and grid overloads rather than generation shortages. Older residential zones and peripheral areas face more frequent outages, while newer localities typically have backup infrastructure. The Karnataka government and BESCOM announced a series of measures in 2025 to improve reliability, including upgrading transmission lines, installing automated fault detection systems, and encouraging rooftop solar adoption through subsidies.

=== Renewable energy expansion ===
To meet rising demand and state renewable energy targets, BESCOM is pursuing a target of 5,000–6,000 MW of additional renewable capacity. Under the PM-KUSUM C scheme, BESCOM is adding 1,051 MW of solar capacity by March 2026, implementing 157 projects to solarise 397 substations and provide reliable daytime electricity to approximately 6.7 lakh farmers. Solar power at approximately ₹5 per unit is significantly cheaper than thermal generation at ₹6.99 per unit, making renewable expansion both an environmental and economic priority.

BESCOM promotes rooftop solar under the PM Surya Ghar scheme and the Karnataka Renewable Energy Policy 2022–27, with net metering arrangements allowing consumers to export surplus power to the grid. Applications are processed through the National Rooftop Solar Portal, with BESCOM committing to 30-day approvals. The Gruha Jyoti scheme, launched by the Karnataka government in August 2023, provides free electricity for up to 200 units per month for eligible households across all ESCOMs including BESCOM.

BESCOM's electricity meter bill of a Gruha Jyoti scheme enrolled account, in Bengaluru (2026)

=== Electric vehicle charging infrastructure ===
Karnataka has the highest number of public EV charging stations in India, with 5,960 stations as of November 2025, of which 4,656 were installed by private firms and the remainder by BESCOM and government agencies. Under the PM E-Drive scheme, Karnataka will receive a further 1,243 charging stations supported by a financial outlay of ₹123.26 crore. BESCOM is also developing charging stations along state highways and tourist spots, and expanding a battery-swapping network in Bengaluru. BESCOM is preparing for an estimated EV charging load of 363.54 MW by 2030, representing a significant addition to the city's power demand profile.

== Solid waste management ==
Bengaluru generates an estimated 4,500–5,000 metric tonnes of solid waste per day at an average per capita generation rate of approximately 0.5 kg per day, making it one of the largest waste-producing cities in South Asia. Approximately 58.5 per cent of waste is generated from households, 34.7 per cent from commercial establishments, and 6.8 per cent from street sweeping. Only approximately 10 per cent of this waste is currently recycled. Solid waste management in Bengaluru has historically been crisis-prone: a major garbage crisis in 2012–13, triggered by the closure of the Mandur landfill following protests from surrounding villages, drew international media attention and prompted a Comptroller and Auditor General performance audit of the BBMP. Multiple landfills including Mavallipura were subsequently closed between 2012 and 2016.

Under the Solid Waste Management Rules, 2016, waste must be segregated at source into biodegradable, dry recyclable, and domestic hazardous categories, but large-scale compliance in Bengaluru remains limited due to inadequate awareness and inconsistent enforcement. A 2025 survey found that 80 per cent of Bengaluru residents rely on GBA/BBMP for waste collection, while 11 per cent still dump waste in open areas. Kitchen waste constitutes the largest share of household waste, indicating a significant need for composting infrastructure. The five corporations under the GBA are responsible for primary collection and transportation, supported by a fleet of 4,646 auto-tippers for door-to-door collection and 618 compactors for secondary transportation.

The Bengaluru Solid Waste Management Limited (BSWML), a company established under the GBA, is designated to oversee integrated waste processing. In October 2025, the GBA and BSWML jointly conducted the Kasa Suriyuva Habba (Garbage Dumping Festival), an awareness drive in which municipal authorities dumped waste on the doorsteps of 218 households that had violated segregation norms, collecting fines of ₹2.8 lakh in the process. The National Green Tribunal and the Karnataka High Court have both issued ongoing directives requiring authorities to cease open dumping and develop scientifically engineered landfills and waste processing infrastructure.

Bengaluru has the largest number of decentralised STPs globally — approximately 2,700, introduced following a 2004 mandate requiring apartment complexes above a certain size to install on-site sewage treatment. This mandatory system, while facing compliance challenges, has created an ecosystem for treated wastewater reuse that could potentially meet up to 26 per cent of the city's water needs. Electronics City (EPIP Zone) provides a micro-scale benchmark: the Electronics City Industrial Township Authority (ELCITA) achieved Zero Waste to Landfill certification from TÜV Rheinland for 2023–24, operating a Material Recovery Facility for the waste streams of approximately 200 member companies.

== Healthcare infrastructure ==
Bengaluru is the healthcare capital of South India, home to over 400 hospitals and among the highest concentrations of super-speciality medical facilities in the country. Major public hospitals include Bowring & Lady Curzon Hospitals (established 1868), Victoria Hospital, and Kidwai Memorial Institute of Oncology. Rajiv Gandhi Institute of Chest Diseases, Indira Gandhi Institute of Child Health, and the Sri Jayadeva Institute of Cardiovascular Sciences and Research are among the state-run specialty institutions.

The privately managed healthcare sector is anchored by large hospital groups including Manipal Hospitals, Fortis Healthcare, Apollo Hospitals, Narayana Health (headquartered in Bengaluru), and Aster DM Healthcare. The city accounts for a disproportionately large share of India's medical tourism — Bengaluru's medical tourism industry rebounded to pre-COVID levels by 2023 and has continued to grow, with Karnataka attracting an estimated two million medical tourists annually, the majority arriving via Bengaluru.

The GBA's five city corporations have inherited the former BBMP's network of primary health centres (PHCs), maternity homes, and urban health posts across the city's wards. Bengaluru suffers from a significant urban health inequity — while tertiary healthcare is world-class, primary health infrastructure in peripheral wards remains under-resourced and understaffed, with ward-level PHCs frequently lacking adequate personnel and supplies.

== Telecommunications ==
Bengaluru is India's foremost technology hub and has among the highest internet penetration rates of any Indian city. The city hosts the headquarters or significant operations of major global technology companies and operates one of India's most extensive fibre-optic cable networks. As of 2024, Bengaluru ranked among the top Indian cities for average mobile internet speeds, with dense 4G coverage and rapidly expanding 5G networks from all major operators — Reliance Jio, Airtel, Vodafone Idea, and BSNL.

The Software Technology Parks of India (STPI) maintains a dedicated node in Bengaluru, providing high-bandwidth satellite and terrestrial connectivity to IT/ITES units. The city is served by multiple submarine cable landing stations through terrestrial fibre links anchored at Chennai, with onward connectivity via Karnataka's KSWAN (Karnataka State Wide Area Network) backbone.

5G deployment in Bengaluru began in 2022 with Airtel and Reliance Jio launching commercial services, initially in high-footfall areas. By mid-2026, 5G coverage extended across most of the city's commercial and residential zones. BSNL's 4G and 5G network expansion — using indigenously developed equipment under the AtmaNirbhar Bharat programme — is progressing in Bengaluru as part of a statewide rollout that began in September 2024.

== Lakes and environment ==
Bengaluru historically possessed over 1,400 lakes and tanks, forming an interlocking system of water bodies that served as the city's water supply, flood mitigation, and groundwater recharge infrastructure. This system was developed over centuries by the Kempe Gowda dynasty and later the Mysore Wadiyars, and by the early 20th century represented one of the most sophisticated urban water management systems in South Asia. Rapid urbanisation from the 1970s onwards led to the encroachment, pollution, and disappearance of the majority of these lakes. Fewer than 200 lakes survive today, and many of those are severely polluted.

Bengaluru's built-up area rose from approximately 37.4 per cent in 2002 to over 93 per cent by 2025 in many zones, according to IISc researchers, sharply reducing permeable surfaces and accelerating both groundwater depletion and the urban heat island effect. A 2025 study analysing NASA satellite data from 2015 to 2024 found that the heat island effect is no longer confined to the urban core but has spread to Bengaluru's suburbs and neighbouring villages, with night-time land surface temperatures showing an increasing trend throughout the peri-urban fringe.

The Varthur Lake and Bellandur Lake — the largest surviving lakes in the city at 220 hectares and 900 acres respectively — became internationally known for toxic foam and fire incidents caused by untreated industrial effluents and sewage inflow from surrounding IT parks and residential areas. Restoration works have been underway since the late 2010s under BDA oversight and National Green Tribunal orders, but progress has been slow and repeatedly disrupted. As of July 2024, desilting operations at Bellandur Lake were only 60 per cent complete; 12 lakh cubic metres of silt remained to be removed. At Varthur Lake, 95 per cent of the silt had been removed by October 2023, but the sewage diversion channel breached during heavy rainfall, and contamination resumed. NGT directives to form a lake development monitoring committee had been ignored by authorities, and the absence of a unified responsible agency has been identified as the primary reason for persistent governance failure.

The GBA has initiated a Comprehensive Lake Management Plan in 2025–26 to restore lakes within its jurisdiction, with BMRCL and BWSSB both directed to fund restoration works for lakes in proximity to their infrastructure corridors. Desilting of Bellandur Lake is targeted for completion by 2025–26. The Ulsoor Lake, Sankey Tank, Hebbal Lake, and Lal Bagh tank are among the water bodies targeted for ecological and aesthetic improvement in the first phase.

== See also ==
- Transport in Bengaluru
- Greater Bengaluru Authority
- Bangalore Development Authority
- Bangalore Water Supply and Sewerage Board
- Bangalore Electricity Supply Company Limited
- Namma Metro
- Category:Healthcare in Bengaluru
- Electronic City
- Software Technology Parks of India
