= Ramya =

Sanskrit female name

- Gender: Female
- Language: Sanskrit

Origin
- Origin: India
- Meaning: "pleasant" "beautiful"
- Region of origin: India

Ramya (Sanskrit: रम्य or रम्या) is a Sanskrit female given name, which means "pleasant" and "delightful", predominantly used in South India.

== Notable people ==
- Ramya (born 1982), Indian actress and politician
- Ramya Barna (born 1986), Indian actress
- Ramya Krishnan (born 1970), Indian actress
- Ramya Mohan, British doctor
- Remya Nambeesan (born 1986), Indian actress
- Ramya NSK, Indian playback singer
- Ramya Pandian (born 1990), Indian actress
- Ramya Ramana (born 1995) American poet
- Ramya Sri (born 1970), Indian actress
- Ramya Subramanian, Indian actress and television host

== See also ==
- Remya (disambiguation), include list of people with name Remya
