= Bangalore Medical College and Research Institute =

Medical college in Karnataka, India

Coordinates: 12°57′33.78″N 77°34′29.07″E

Bengaluru Medical College and Research Institute
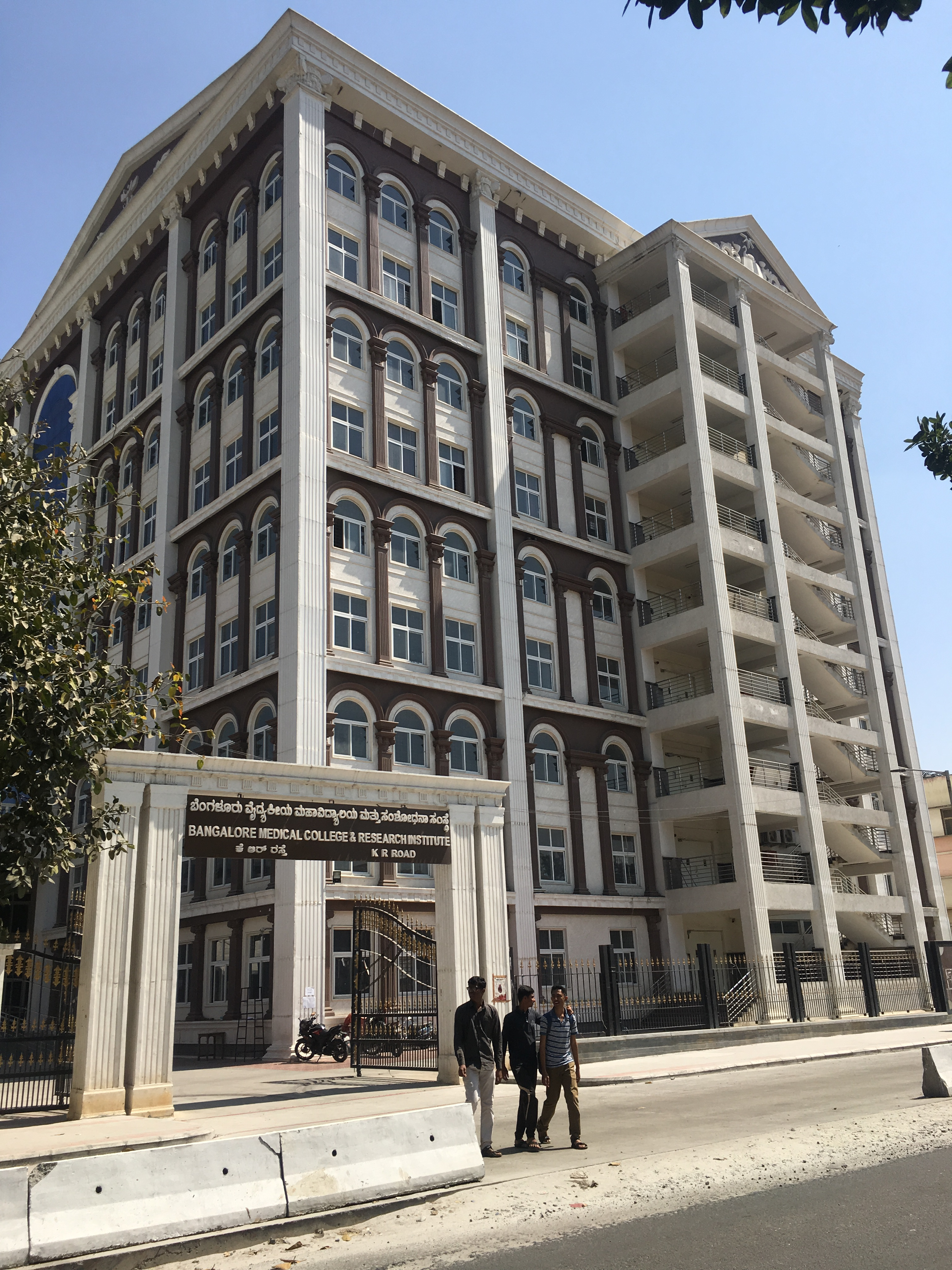
- BMCRI building
- Former name: Bangalore Medical College
- Type: Public
- Established: 1955; 71 years ago
- Academic affiliations: Rajiv Gandhi University of Health Sciences
- Director: Dr. Kavya S. T.
- Undergraduates: 250 per annum
- Postgraduates: 135 per annum
- Doctoral students: 12 per annum
- Other students: 420 per annum^{a}
- Location: Bengaluru, Karnataka, India
- Campus: Urban, 200 acres
- Website: Official website

Bengaluru Medical College and Research Institute (BMCRI), (ಬೆಂಗಳೂರು ವೈದ್ಯಕೀಯ ಮಹಾವಿದ್ಯಾಲಯ ಮತ್ತು ಸಂಶೋಧನಾ ಸಂಸ್ಥೆ) formerly Bangalore Medical College (BMC), is a medical college in Bengaluru, India run by the Government of Karnataka. It is on K.R. Road, near City Market. It is one of ten government medical colleges in Karnataka. BMCRI is an autonomous institution under the Rajiv Gandhi University of Health Sciences, Bengaluru.

== History ==
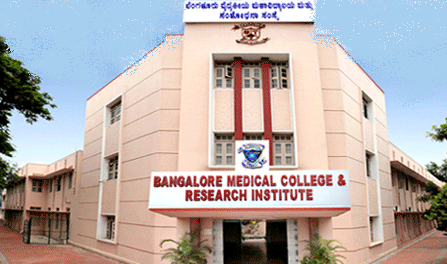
Bangalore Medical College and Research Institute

It was established in 1955 by Dr. Shivram and Dr. Mohammed Shafi Mekhri in what was then the fort police station ground. It was built by civil engineer and architect, Mr. V. Ramamoorthy, who built it in a record time of 6 months. The college was initially run by the Mysore Medical Education Society and was later handed over to the Government of Karnataka in 1956 and was affiliated to Bangalore University. After the formation of Rajiv Gandhi University of Health Sciences BMC was affiliated to the new university in 1997.

It celebrated its golden jubilee in 2005–2006 with major renovation and the inauguration of a state-of-the-art digital library and Basavarajendra Auditorium. In 2006, the college was granted autonomous status by the Government of Karnataka. The college is presently undergoing major renovation along the lines of AIIMS.

=== Upgrade of the institute to the level of AIIMS ===
Work on upgrade of the college to the level of AIIMS started in March 2007. Under the ₹1.2 billion (US$13 million) centrally funded project upgrade work is taking place in the college as well as all the affiliated hospitals.

== Attached hospitals ==
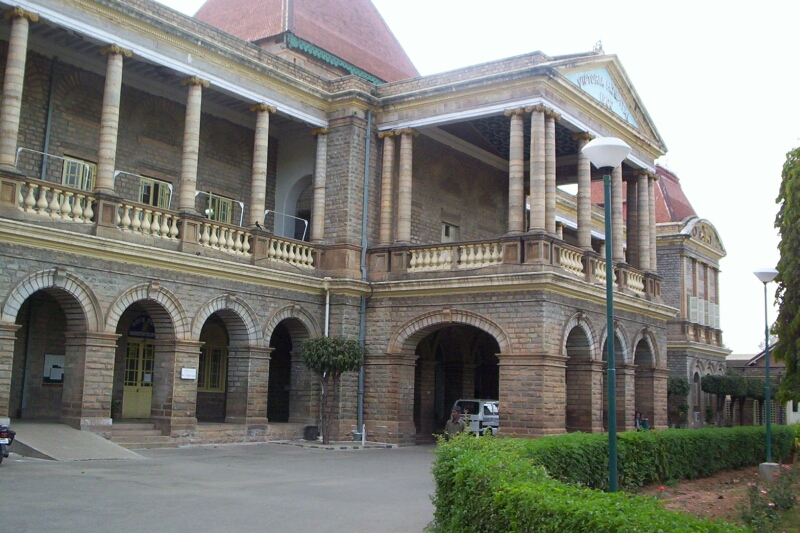
The old building of Victoria Hospital

The teaching hospitals attached to the institution are the following hospitals:

Name	Location	Type
Victoria Hospital	K. R. Road	General hospital
Vanivilas Women and Children Hospital	K. R. Road	Women and children's hospital
Minto Ophthalmic Hospital	Chamrajpet	Speciality eye institute
SDS Tuberculosis Sanatorium	near Hosur Road	Respiratory diseases and thoracic surgical centre

Victoria Hospital, inaugurated on 8 December 1900 by Lord Curzon the then Viceroy of India, started as a health centre with 140 bed strength, is now the second largest Hospital in India accommodating more than 1000 patients at a time. The facilities available includes departments of Medicine, Surgery, Orthopaedics, Dermatology, Psychiatry, Radiology and Radiotherapy, physiotherapy, Forensic Medicine super specialities include Plastic Surgery, Surgical and Medical Gastro Enterology, Neurology, Neurosurgery, Cardiology and Urology

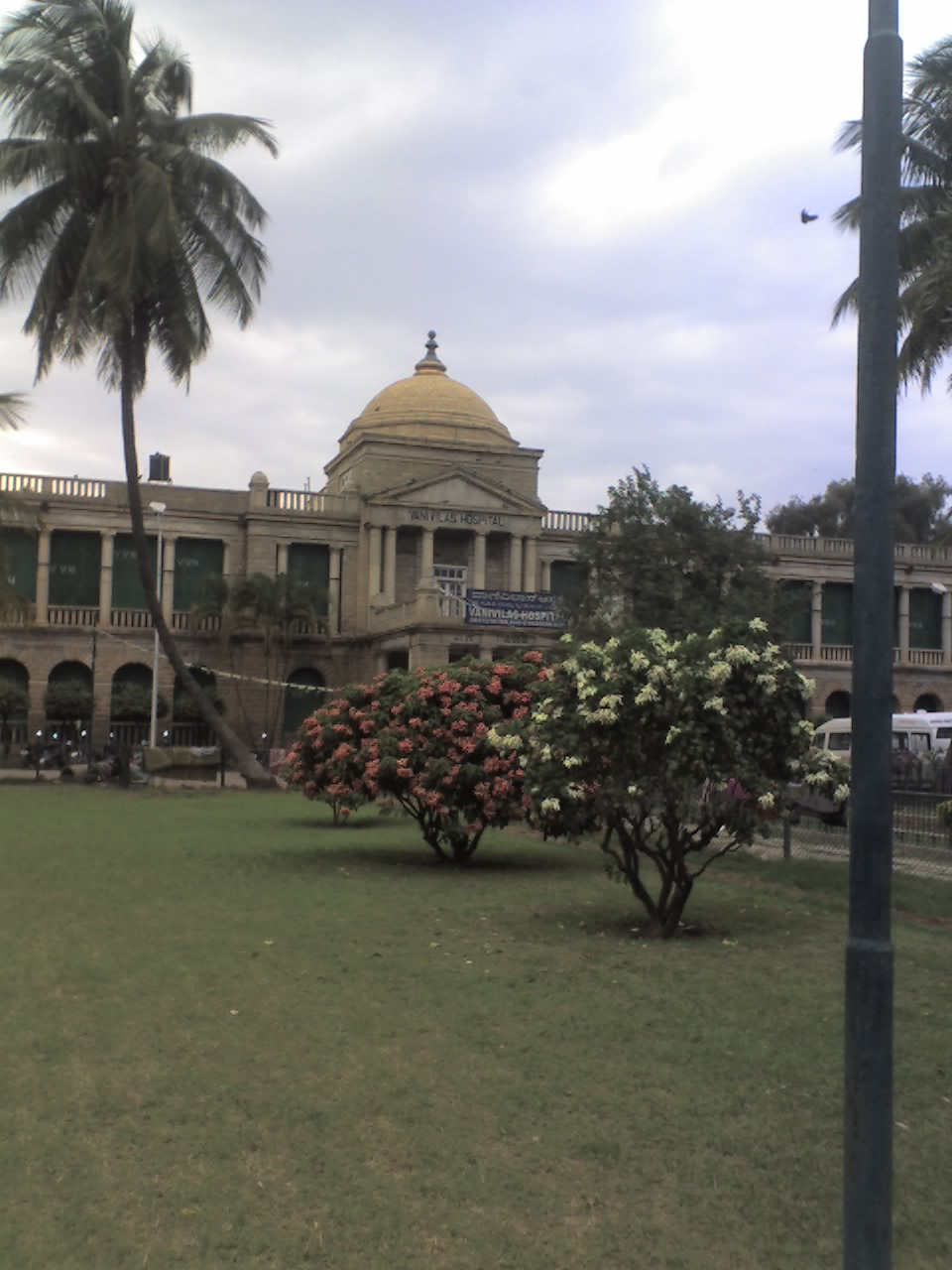
The main building of Vanivilas Women and Children Hospital

Vanivilas Women and Children Hospital, also one of the oldest hospitals has 536 beds and an average of 75-80 patients are treated as out-patients every day, 17-20 patients admitted, and average 500 surgeries per month are conducted. It has well equipped Obstetrics, Gynecology, Pediatrics and Pediatric Surgery Departments. There is a neonatal intensive care unit. Vanivilas hospital is a center for excellence in prevention of parent to child transmission of AIDS.

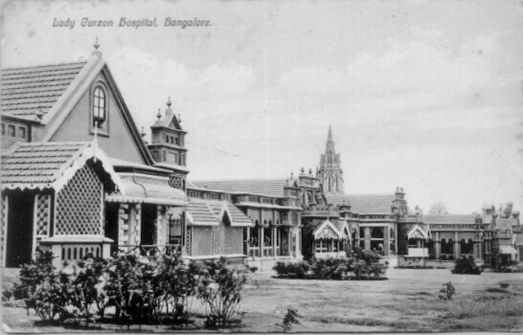
Bowring & Lady Curzon Hospitals

Bowring & Lady Curzon Hospitals is a multispeciality hospital, located in the heart of Bangalore City, at Shivajinagar. The hospital is over 100 years old, approximately 2 km towards east of Vidhana Soudha. It has 686 beds and an average of 700-900 patients are treated as outpatients every day, 70-80 patients get admitted, and average 420-450 deliveries per month are conducted in addition to 800 surgeries per month.

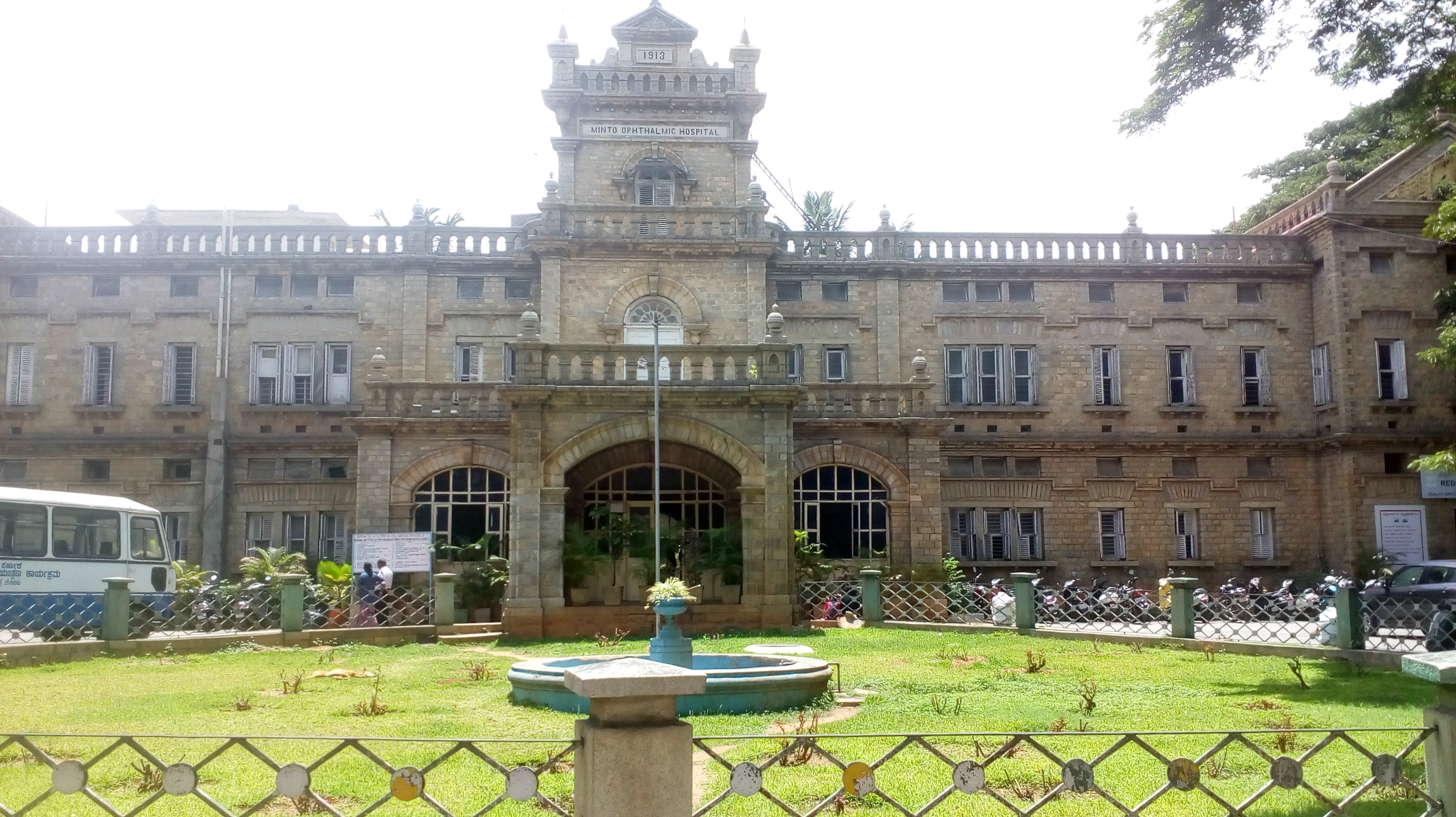
Minto Eye Hospital

Minto Eye Hospital is the 300 bedded, tertiary ophthalmic hospital attached to BMCRI, which caters to the need of Karnataka and also the neighbouring areas of other states. It includes an Eye Bank, Glaucoma clinic, Squint clinic and a Vitreo retinal centre.

A 203-bed super-speciality tertiary care hospital PMSSY Hospital has been constructed at a cost of ₹72 crores under the Pradhana Mantri Swasthya Suraksha Yojana (PMSSY) on the premises of the college. The new hospital has super-speciality departments of neurology, neurosurgery, plastic surgery, cardiology, paediatric surgery and surgical gastroenterology.

Apart from this, it is involved in community health facilities like Nelamangala Taluk Hospital, the urban family welfare center on Siddaiah Road and primary health centers in Pavgada, Sundekoppa, K. G. Halli and Hessarghatta. As a part of rural outreach specialist doctors are sent by the college to these rural centres every month. The teaching hospitals attached to Bangalore Medical College have more than 3,000 beds. Apart from undergraduate courses, postgraduate courses are available in most specialities. Mahabodhi Burns Centre is a state-of-the-art burns department with an associated Skin bank which caters to all of Karnataka.

These hospitals with total bed strength of around 3500, cater to half of the population of Bangalore City and surrounding areas.

== Campus ==
Basavarajendra Auditorium

Spread over a total area of 200 acres, the campus includes the academic block, hospitals, library, hostels, student lounge, food court, gymnasium, a basketball court, volleyball court etc. The boys hostels are Bheema Hostel located near Rayan Circle, Tunga Bhadra Hostel within campus and another near Palace Road which holds a special place. The ladies Kaveri hostel is located within campus next to the Tunga Bhadra hostel. The postgraduate hostel is located in Chamrajpet.

A digital library and a well equipped seminar hall has been constructed by the BMC Alumni Association. This digital library has 80 nodes, which have access to the latest medical journals and is used by the students and faculty of Bangalore Medical College and Research Institute for research purposes and to acquire the latest medical knowledge. A Seminar Hall has been constructed with a capacity of 280 seats with access to the latest equipment for Tele-medicine. The Tele-Medicine unit was started in collaboration with ISRO on the eve of Golden jubilee celebrations and it makes BMCRI the first Government Medical college to provide this facility in the state of Karnataka.

The Clinical Skills Centre in the BMCRI campus was inaugurated by Sri Ramadass SA, The Minister for Medical Education, Karnataka on 17 November 2011. The centre was set up at a cost of 95 lakhs INR with donations from the alumni, Infosys Foundation and GMR Varalakshmi foundation. The centre offers hands-on training in Microsurgery techniques applicable in various super specialties like laparoscopic surgery, neurosurgery, Plastic surgery, ENT surgery and Ophthalmology. The mentors at the centre include teaching faculty from BMCRI, other medical colleges and private practicing surgeons. With this, BMCRI became one of the very few centres in this country to offer this facility and training.

The Infosys Foundation has constructed a well equipped 24 hours central laboratory at Victoria Hospital campus which includes the Pathology, Microbiology and the Biochemistry labs. It provides the latest diagnostic tests at subsidised rates for the poor and needy patients.

The Centenary building houses new wards, the Nuclear medicine department with gamma camera and modern operation theatres. Vishranthi Dhama, A Dharmashala on the campus provides highly subsidized accommodation for patients' attendants.

== Student life ==
Cobalt Skies 2012

BMCRI annually holds an inter-collegiate fest called Cobalt Skies in October. Spread out over 3 days, it is one of the biggest college festivals in Karnataka. The festival draws the best talents of India to its competitions, covering areas ranging from music and drama to literary games and quizzing. There are several events focused on building social responsibility amongst the youth. Professional shows and workshops by groups are an added attraction.

Cobalt Skies also features a medical fest called Panacea which is one of the biggest medical fests in India. It brings participation from medical students from Karnataka and all over India in its various medical events. It aims to encourage interest and innovation in research and clinical medicine among students and to provide a platform for students and teachers to interact.

Samara is the annual intra-collegiate sports meet held in April at the Kanteerava Stadium, Bengaluru.

An annual Intra college Fest called Chrysalis is held in the month of April. It features various cultural and literary and sports events and helps in bringing out new, raw talents into the front through means of healthy competition between different batches of BMCRI.

BMCRI publishes an annual magazine Ambrosia which includes literary as well as professional contributions from the students as well as the faculty of the college.

The college also has various literary and educational clubs like chess society, quiz society, debate society, dance groups and a music society. Past college bands include The Dirty Aprons, Rudra, The Operation Theatre and Death on Diagnosis.

The college also has an informal literature club which publishes a monthly editorial titled Liber.

The college also has an art and photography club named, The Artisan Lounge.

== Ranking ==
University and college rankings

Medical – India
- India Today (2024): 13

BMCRI was ranked 13th among medical colleges in India in 2024 by India Today.

== Admissions ==
=== Undergraduate courses ===
==== M.B.B.S. ====
The college offers the four-and-a-half-year M.B.B.S. course with a one-year compulsory rotating internship in affiliated hospitals. There are 250 seats for which admission are through NEET-UG. 15% of the seats are reserved under all-India quota and 85% under the State quota. There are quotas for SC, ST and OBC students. Admission is extremely competitive.

==== Nursing ====
Government College Of Nursing established in 1971, which comes under BMCRI, located within the campus of Victoria Hospital (Bangalore Medical College). The college offers the following courses.

- Bsc in Nursing is four years undergraduate programme. There are 50 seats for Bsc in Nursing for which admissions are through KCET(KEA) earlier. From 2021 onwards admission will be through NEET-UG. Eligibility: PUC /Class 12( Physics, Chemistry and Biology).
- Msc in Nursing is 2 years post graduate programme. There are 18 seats for Msc in Nursing. Four seats in each specialty Medical-Surgical Nursing, Mental Health Nursing, Mid Wifery & Obstetric Nursing and Community Health Nursing.Admissions are through PGET (KEA). There will be 2 seats reserved for in-service candidates in each specialty.
- Post-Basic Bsc in Nursing is a 2-year course. There are 40 seats for PBscN for which admissions are through KEA.

==== Paramedical courses ====
There are 420 seats. Eligibility: SSLC /class 10th/PUC/Class 12 or equivalent pass

- Medical Laboratory Technology
- Medical X-Ray Technology
- Medical Radiotherapy Technology
- Health Inspector
- Dialysis Technology
- Operation Theatre Technology
- Ophthalmic Technology
- Medical Records Technology

=== Post-graduate courses ===
The college offers 135 seats for post graduate courses The seats are filled through NEET-PG.

==== M.D. ====
- Anaesthesiology
- Biochemistry
- Dermatology
- Forensic Medicine
- General Medicine
- Microbiology
- Gynaecology
- Pediatrics
- Pathology
- Pharmacology
- Physiology
- Preventive and Social Medicine
- Psychiatry
- Pulmonary Medicine
- Radio Diagnosis
- Radiotherapy

==== M.S. ====
- Anatomy
- Otorhinolaryngology
- General Surgery
- Ophthalmology
- Orthopaedics

=== Superspeciality courses ===
BMCRI has 12 seats for superspeciality courses. The number is scheduled to increase after the opening of the PMSSY Super-specialty Block.

==== M. Ch. ====
- Plastic surgery
- Urology
- Pediatric surgery
- Surgical gastroenterology
- Neuro surgery

==== DM ====
- Neurology
- Cardiology
- Critical Care Medicine

==== Diploma ====
BMCRI offer 71 seats for Diploma courses.

- Neurology
- Cosmetic Surgery
- Radiotherapy

==== Post-doctoral fellowship courses ====
BMCRI has 12 seats for Fellowship courses every year.

- Gastroenterology
- Vitreo-retinal surgery

== Notable alumni ==
- Sudhakar Shenoy MD, Adult, Child and Adolescent Psychiatrist, was nationally elected to the Board of Trustees for the American Psychiatric Association (APA), Washington DC, USA.
- Y. G. Parameshwara, alumnus and former faculty in pharmacology was the first blind person to qualify as a doctor of medicine in India
- Ramya Mohan, clinical psychiatrist with National Health Service
- Santosh G. Honavar, ocular oncologist, Shanti Swarup Bhatnagar laureate
- Hanumappa Sudarshan, Indian social worker and tribal rights activist, Right Livelihood Award and Padma Shri awardee
- T. K. Sreepada Rao, well known nephrologist. Discovered Nephropathies associated with intravenous Heroin addiction and HIV infection
- Dinker Belle Rai, surgeon, Fellow of the American College of Surgeons
- A. N. Prabhu Deva, former vice chancellor of Bangalore University
- Yathindra Siddaramaiah MLA of Varuna Constituency. He is a pathologist.
- Umesh Jadhav Member of Parliament from Gulbarga.
- M. K. Muneer, Former Minister for Social Welfare and Panchayath Affairs, Government of Kerala
- Jyotsna Srikanth, an indian-british violinist, who studied MD pathology

== See also ==
- Victoria Hospital
- Vanivilas Women and Children Hospital
- Bowring & Lady Curzon Hospitals
- Minto Eye Hospital
- List of medical colleges in India
- List of educational institutions in Bangalore
