= K. Bhujang Shetty =

Indian ophthalmologist (1953-2023)

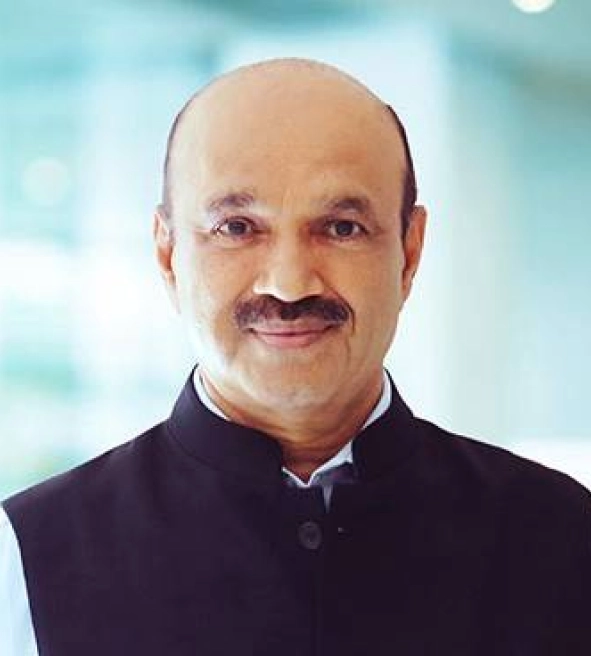
- Born: Katkeri Bhujang Shetty; 21 October 1953; Shankaranarayana, Udupi district, Karnataka, India
- Died: 19 May 2023 (aged 69); Bengaluru, Karnataka, India
- Occupation: Ophthalmologist
- Known for: Founder of Narayana Nethralaya
- Awards: Karnataka Rajyotsava Award (2010); Seva Rathna (2018)

Katkeri Bhujang Shetty (21 October 1953 – 19 May 2023) was an Indian ophthalmologist and the founder-chairman of Narayana Nethralaya, a super-speciality eye care hospital in Bengaluru, Karnataka. He was known for promoting eye donation in Karnataka and for initiating the KIDROP telemedicine programme for screening premature infants. He received the Karnataka Rajyotsava Award in 2010.

== Early life and education ==
Shetty was born on 21 October 1953 in Shankaranarayana village, Udupi district, Karnataka. He attended Baldwin Boys' High School in Bengaluru, where he was school captain and sports captain.

He completed his MBBS from Bangalore Medical College in 1978, and his MS in Ophthalmology from the Regional Institute of Ophthalmology, Minto Ophthalmic Hospital, Bangalore Medical College, in 1982.

== Career ==
After completing his postgraduate training in 1982, Shetty established a small ophthalmology clinic in Srirampuram, Bengaluru. In 1993, he opened a larger facility in Rajajinagar, which developed into Narayana Nethralaya, a multi-speciality eye hospital. The hospital later expanded to multiple campuses across Bengaluru.

Shetty specialised in cataract and phacoemulsification surgery. An obituary in the Indian Journal of Ophthalmology noted that he was among the first to establish higher-end private-sector eye care services in Karnataka.

In December 2022, a free eye hospital named Narayana Devalaya was inaugurated in Tumakuru under the Narayana Nethralaya umbrella.

== Eye donation advocacy ==
Shetty promoted eye donation in Karnataka. He enlisted the support of Kannada film actor Rajkumar, who pledged to donate his eyes, leading to the establishment of the Dr. Rajkumar Eye Bank at Narayana Nethralaya in 1994. Upon Dr Rajkumar's death the pledge was fulfilled by his family. When Rajkumar's son Puneeth Rajkumar died in October 2021, his corneas were donated to the eye bank and used to restore sight in four patients.

According to the Indian Journal of Ophthalmology, the eye bank had received more than 65,000 eye pledges and over 10,000 tissue donations by the time of Shetty's death in 2023.

== KIDROP programme ==
Shetty helped initiate the Karnataka Internet Assisted Diagnosis of Retinopathy of Prematurity (KIDROP) programme, a public-private partnership between Narayana Nethralaya and the Government of India, which began in 2008. The programme used trained technicians and wide-field digital imaging to screen premature infants for retinopathy of prematurity across rural neonatal units in Karnataka.

Peer-reviewed research published in the Indian Journal of Ophthalmology and Seminars in Fetal and Neonatal Medicine, on which Shetty was listed as a co-author, documented the programme's operation across multiple zones and over 80 neonatal units in Karnataka. The Indian Journal of Ophthalmology in memoriam stated the programme had screened more than 80,000 infants by 2023.

== Awards and honours ==
Karnataka Rajyotsava Award (2010), in the medical category Seva Rathna Award (2018)

== Death ==
Shetty died on 19 May 2023 in Bengaluru from cardiac arrest at the age of 69. He had returned home after seeing patients when he suffered the cardiac arrest and was admitted to Manipal Hospital, Yeshwanthpur, where he was declared dead at approximately 9:40 pm. His eyes were donated after his death, in keeping with his lifelong advocacy for eye donation.
