= Minto Eye Hospital =

Minto Ophthalmic Hospital
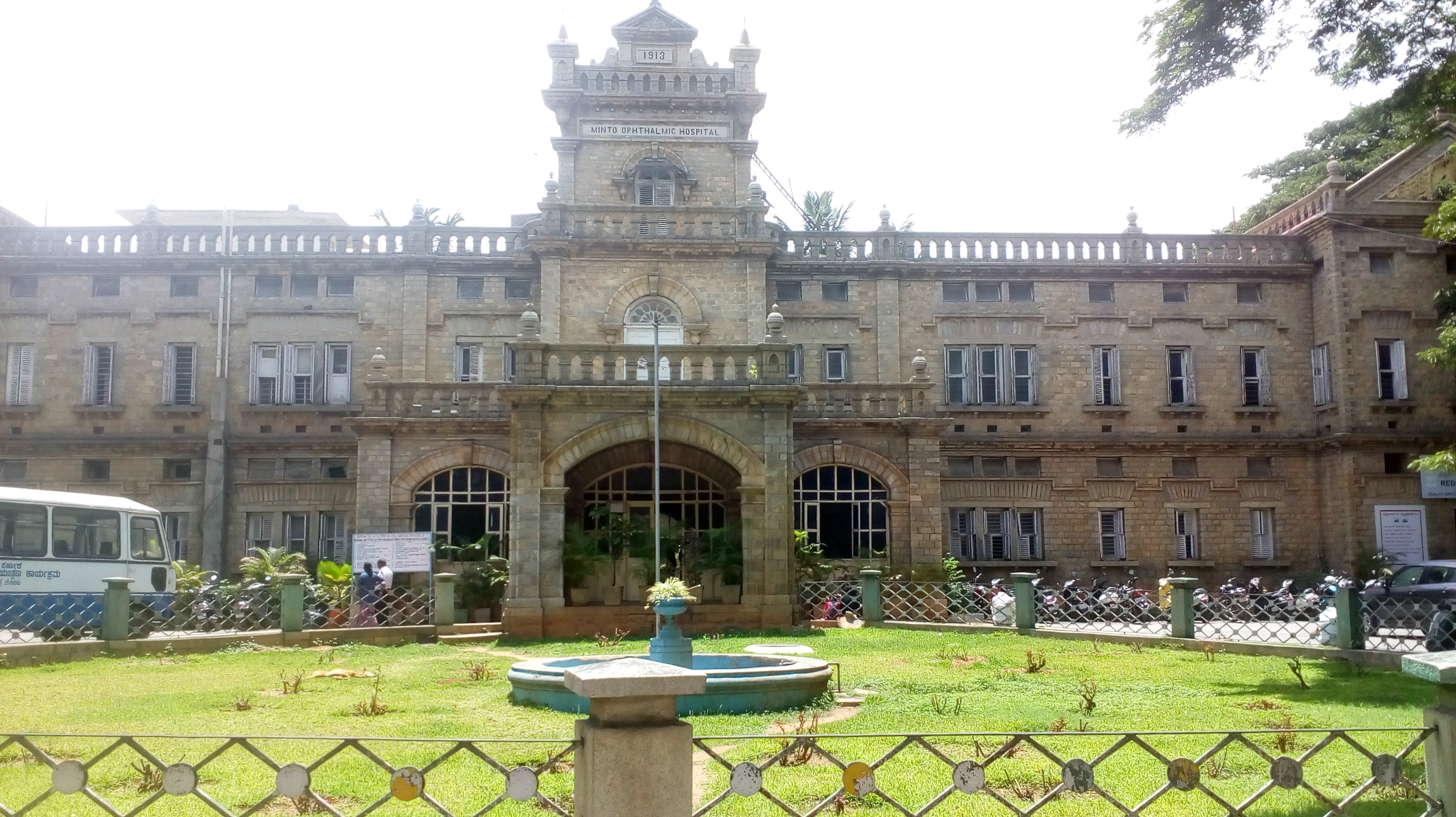

Geography
- Location: Chamrajpet, Bengaluru, Karnataka, India
- Coordinates: 12°57′42.93″N 77°34′18.84″E

Organisation
- Funding: Government hospital
- Type: Specialist/Teaching
- Affiliated university: Bangalore Medical College and Research Institute

Services
- Beds: 300

History
- Opened: 1896; 129 years ago

Links
- Website: https://mhbmcri.karnataka.gov.in/english
- Lists: Hospitals in India

Minto Ophthalmic Hospital is a government run specialty hospital in Bengaluru treating diseases of the eye. Minto Ophthalmic Hospital, (a.k.a. Regional Institute of Ophthalmology, Minto Ophthalmic Hospital), was established in 1896, making it one of the oldest speciality eye hospitals in the world. The hospital was started in Chikkapete area in 1896, moved to Lalbagh Lodge in 1897 and later shifted to the present building in 1913 which was constructed during the reign of Nalwadi Krishnaraja Wadiyar IV, the King of Mysuru state. It is affiliated to the Bangalore Medical College and Research Institute, and is an institution of national importance.

It is a 300 bedded, tertiary ophthalmic hospital. It includes Community Ophthalmology, Cornea & Eye Bank, Refractive Surgery, Glaucoma clinic, Squint, Oculoplasty & Neurophthalmology clinic, Low Visual Aids clinic and a Vitreo-retinal & Uvea clinic.

Hundreds of ophthalmologists have been trained at this institute since its inception. A tertiary referral centre, Minto Ophthalmic Hospital offers its services at subsidized rates to the poor and needy of Karnataka and its neighbouring states.

== Other sources ==
- Clinical phenotype and linkage analysis of the congenital fibrosis of the extraocular muscles in an Indian family
- A RARE CASE OF PROPTOSIS IN A NEW-BORN CHILD. Br J Ophthalmol. 1927 Feb;11(2):79
- Childhood blindness in a rural population of southern India: prevalence and aetiology - Ophthalmic Epidemiol. 2008 May-Jun;15(3):176-82
