= Y. G. Parameshwara =

Indian physician

Dr. Y. G. Parameshwara

Y. G. Parameshwara (Kannada: ವೈ.ಜಿ. ಪರಮೇಶ್ವರ) was a medical doctor in the state of Karnataka, India. He was the first Indian blind doctor and practiced medicine despite being blind.

== Early life and education ==
Dr. Y.G.Parameshwar was born at Yallambelase in Kadur taluk of Chikkamagaluru district. He studied medicine in Karnataka University but during his final year at MBBS he suffered retinal haemorrhage and lost his eyesight. He discontinued his studies for some time but was determined to complete his medical degree despite his vision being impaired. He succeeded in his venture and obtained an MBBS degree in 1977. With this, he became the first Indian and one of blind doctor in the world; the first one being Dr. David Hartman of the United States. Jacob Bolotin was the world's first totally blind physician fully licensed to practice medicine. He was married to Prema and had two sons.

== Career ==
After completing his MBBS, he started practicing medicine. In 1979, he was appointed Health Officer and Assistant Surgeon in the Department of Health and Family Welfare of the Government of Karnataka. He was also appointed as the curator of the Pathology museum in Bangalore. He decided later to devote himself to the teaching profession and joined the Bangalore Medical College as a lecturer in Pharmacology in 1980, a profession which he continued till his death.

== Awards and recognition ==
The Ministry of Social Welfare of the Government of India awarded him in 1984 with a citation that said that the award was for public recognition of his outstanding performance as the most efficient employee in the category of visually impaired. This award was presented to him by the then President of India, Giani Zail Singh. He was felicitated for his important service to the society by the organisation Chinnara Koota of Sagar in their first anniversary celebrations. Speaking in this function, Dr. Parameshwara indicated his dream of setting up a novel old-age home in Bangalore with the financial help of the government and other non-governmental organisations. However, this remained as a dream because within a week of receiving this award, Dr. Parameshwara suffered a fatal cardiac arrest. In order to promote the significant achievement of the doctor, the members of Chinnara Koota decided to urge the Karnataka Pre university course textbook committee to include a lesson on the life of the doctor and the challenges he faced in one of the textbooks. They were helped in this venture by B.R. Vijayakumar, the Principal of the Government PU Women's College of Sagar, who was also a member of the Text Book Committee. Their efforts were recognised when a lesson on Dr. Parameshwara was included in the first year Pre University English Text Book in the year 2005. The first copy of this textbook was presented to his widow Prema by Ramalinga Reddy, the Minister for Primary and Secondary Education in the Government of Karnataka.
