= Seedlings Braille Books for Children =

U.S. nonprofit organization

- Formation: 1984; 42 years ago
- Founder: Debra Bonde
- Type: 501(c)(3)
- Tax ID no.: 38-2565354
- Headquarters: 14151 Farmington Road; Livonia, Michigan
- Director: Debra Bonde
- Staff: 9 (2006)
- Volunteers: 50 (2006)
- Website: seedlings.org

Seedlings Braille Books for Children is an American 501(c)(3) non-profit organization based in Livonia, Michigan, that provides children’s books in braille free and below cost to children who are blind and visually impaired. It has distributed books across the United States, Canada, and over 75 other countries worldwide.

The organization also operates various programs that provide free braille materials in the United States and Canada. Most notable: the Book Angel Program which provides four free braille books a year to children with vision loss under 21 years of age. The Rose Project is another program that provides free braille transcriptions of World Book Encyclopedia articles to blind and visually impaired students. As well as the aforementioned programs Seedlings has a program for Teachers of the Visually Impaired in the U.S. to receive four free books each calendar year. These programs are always running and never end.

Seedlings is run by a staff of 11 full- and part-time employees, and many loyal volunteers.

== Recognition ==
The organization was awarded the Dr. Jacob Bolotin Award by the National Federation of the Blind for "outstanding contributions toward achieving the full integration of the blind into society on a basis of equality" in 2015.
