= Ramya (disambiguation) =

Ramya is an Indian feminine given name.

Ramya may also refer to:

- Ramya (actress) or Divya Spandana (born 1982), Indian film actress and politician

== See also ==
- Remya (disambiguation)
- "Ramaya", a 1975 song by Afric Simone
- Ramyah, a village in Lebanon
