= Vanivilas Women and Children Hospital =

Vani Vilas Women and Children Hospital
- Public Hospital
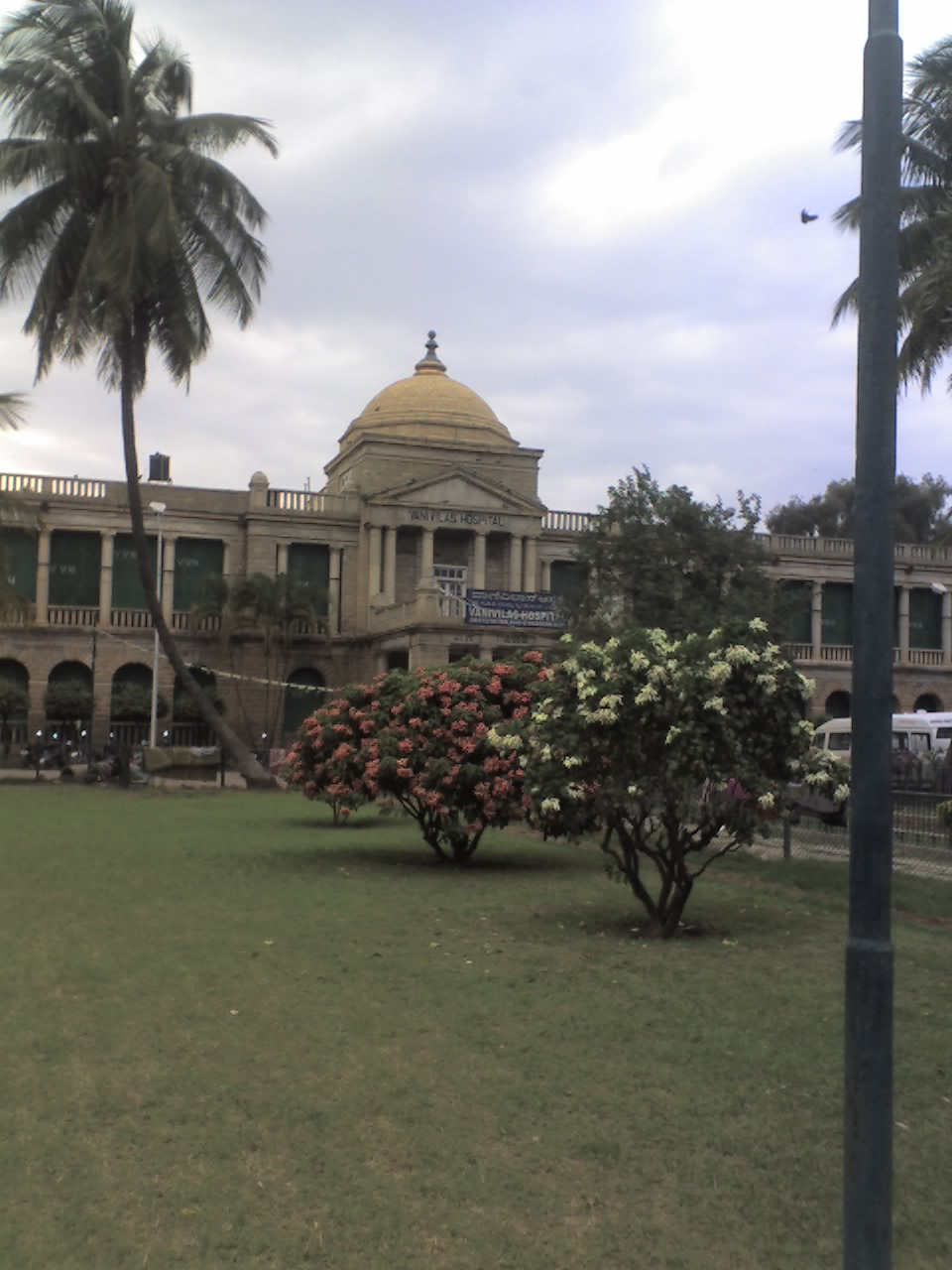
- The main building of hospital

Geography
- Location: Krishnarajendra Road, Bengaluru, India

Services
- Emergency department: Yes

History
- Founded: 1935; 91 years ago

Links
- Website: www.bmcri.org/vanivilas_hosp.html
- Lists: Hospitals in India

Vani Vilas Women and Children Hospital is a government run hospital in Bengaluru, Karnataka, India. It is attached to the Bangalore Medical College and Research Institute.

It was built in 1935, at a cost of ₹ 4 lakhs. The first medical superintendent was M. C. Albuquerque. It was renovated in 2002 at a cost of ₹ 4.2 crores.

In 2000, it was selected as one of the 11 AIDS control centres in India, and the sole one in Karnataka.

The Vani Vilas Hospital stands on the grounds where the Fort Church and the Fort Cemetery once stood. The Land was acquired from the Church of England by the Mysore Government. Land was provided at Hardinge Road, Chamarajpet as compensation, where now stands the St. Luke's Church.

== Notable ==
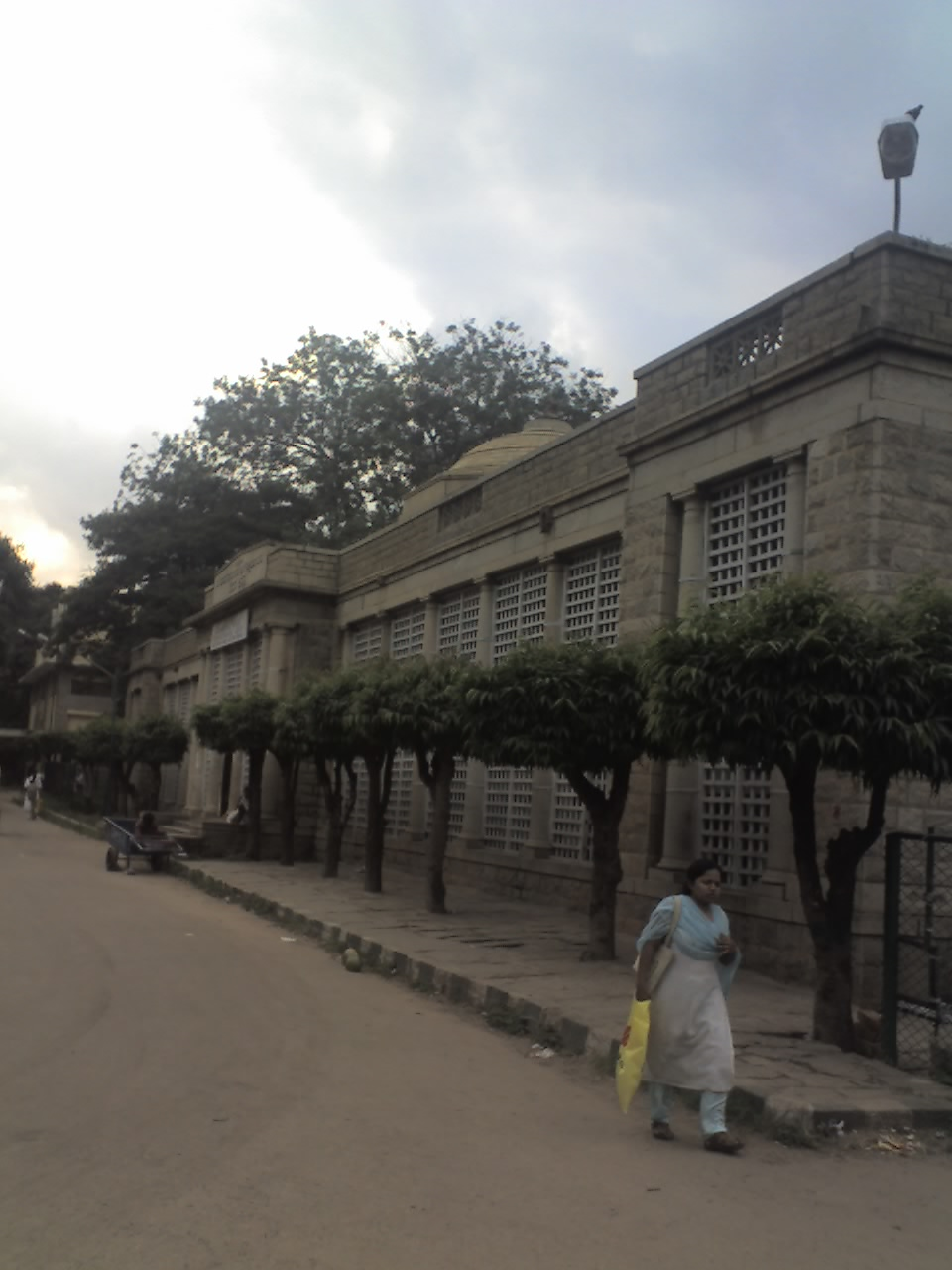
The out patient department of Vanivilas Women and Children Hospital

Indian movie superstar Rajnikanth was born at this hospital on 12 December 1950.
