= Bangalore Water Supply and Sewerage Board =

Government agency in Bengaluru, Karnataka, India

- BWSSB logo

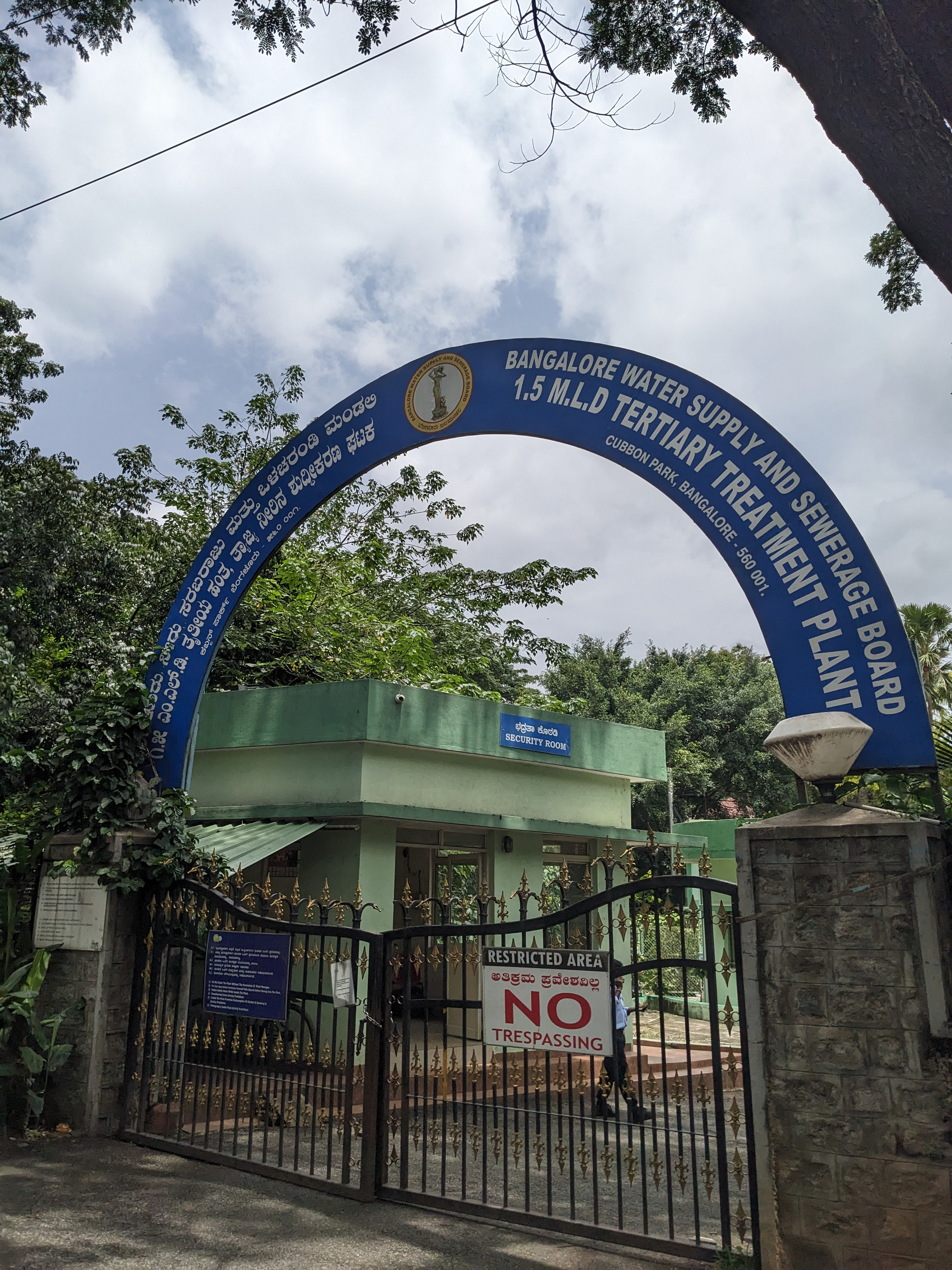
- A water treatment plant of BWSSB

Statutory corporation overview
- Formed: 10 September 1964 (62 years ago)
- Jurisdiction: Government of Karnataka
- Headquarters: Bengaluru, Karnataka, India
- Website: https://bwssb.karnataka.gov.in/english

The Bangalore Water Supply and Sewerage Board (BWSSB) is the premier governmental agency responsible for sewage disposal and water supply to the Indian city of Bengaluru. It was formed in 1964.

== Water supply ==
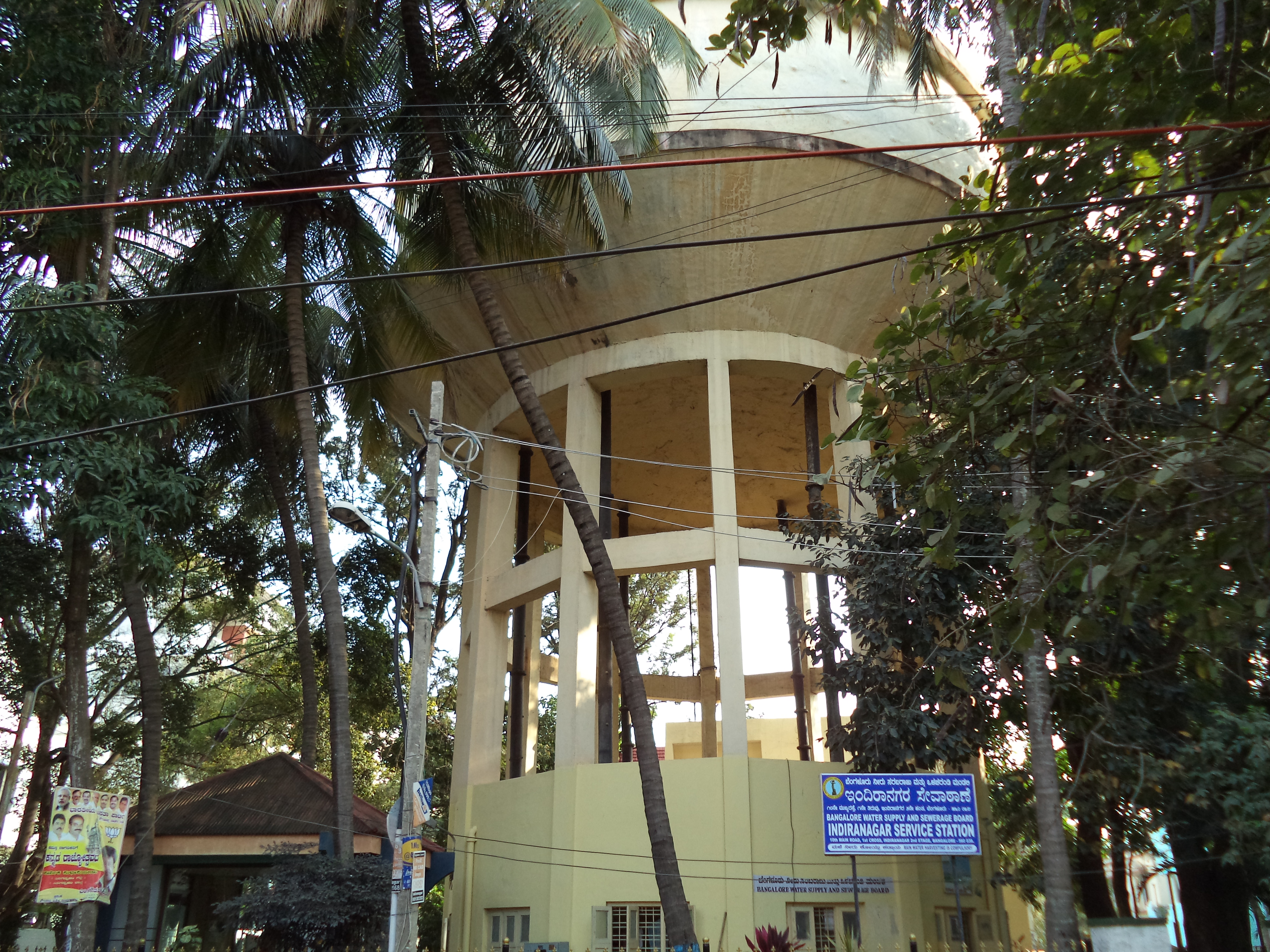
Typical BWSSB water supply tank for the locality.

BWSSB's Kaveri water meter for houses in Bengaluru (2026)

BWSSB currently supplies approximately 900 million liters (238 million gallons) of water to the city per day, despite a municipal demand of 1.3 billion liters. Water for the city (with a population of 10 million) comes from a number of sources, with 80% of it coming from the Cauvery River. Water is also drawn from the Arkavathy River, but the supply does not meet the demand.

The Per Capita water supply that BWSSB is able to provide averages 100 to 125 liters per capita per day. However, the actual availability of water to the poor areas of the city is limited by infrastructure, and so for these areas, the per capita supply can be as low as 40 to 45 liters per day. The per capita national standard for a city the size of Bengaluru is 150 to 200 liters per day, From the month of March 2012, water supply in Whitefield has been stopped, with even rich neighborhoods left to fend for themselves.

=== Kaveri River project ===
The majority of the water for Bengaluru is imported by the BWSSB from the Cauvery River, over 100 kilometers (62 mi) south of the city. Cauvery water was originally drawn from a reservoir near the village of Thorekadanahalli. To meet the increasing demand, the "Cauvery Water Supply Scheme" was undertaken by the BWSSB, with Stages I - III completed. Stage IV is currently being built, with Phase I completed and bringing an additional 270 million liters to the city. Construction of Stage IV: Phase II is expected to bring an additional 510 million liters, and will be completed by 2010.

The energy required to transport the water this distance consumes 75% of the agency's revenues.

=== Arkavathy River ===
Up to 20% of the normal water supply for Bengaluru comes from the Arkavathy River, from two reservoirs built on the river, the Hesaraghatta (or Hesseraggatta) which was built in 1894 and the Tippagondanahalli Reservoir (or T G Halli), which was built in 1933.

In June 2007, T G Halli, from which BWSSB pumped 35 million liters per day into the western parts of the city, had effectively gone dry due to lack of rainfall over its watershed. BWSSB officials stated that they would address the issue initially by making water available for only one hour a day, and then by diverting water from other parts of the city, as well as bringing water in by truck. The quality of the water in the reservoir has also become compromised by the discharge of effluent into the reservoir.

=== Rainwater harvesting ===
To further address water supply issues, BWSSB has studied the rainwater harvesting (RWH) techniques used in Chennai, where such methods have greatly reduced water shortage issues. RWH methods are becoming mandatory in Bengaluru. In addition, in April 2007, BWSSB issued a moratorium on new building hookups to the water system. The moratorium was lifted in July, but only on new buildings that have a RWH system installed.

=== Water rationing ===
The BWSSB is also considering implementing a mandatory water rationing program in order to evenly distribute what water supplies exist. A small trial rationing program was instituted in March 2007. Electronic water meters would shut off after the allotted amount of water was used, but the program was considered a technical failure, due in part to software issues.

=== Water table issues ===
Groundwater extraction has caused the water table to drop variously from 90 to 300 meters (300 to 980 feet) below ground level (as compared to an average water table depth of about 30 meters (98 feet) two decades ago), according to the Indian Institute of Science.

The situation affecting T G Halli are not isolated. Rapid urbanization in and around Bengaluru has destroyed many wetlands areas (of the 51 lakes in the city in 1973, only 17 remain in 2007), which has also contributed to the decrease in the water table.

== Sewerage system ==
Bengaluru's original sewerage system was built in 1922, a time when the city was much smaller than it is today; the original system served only the heart of the city. In 1950, with the city greatly expanding, a project was initiated to greatly expand the sewerage system. After the BWSSB was formed in the 1960s, programs were again implemented to expand the system to not sewer areas. The current sewer system utilizes stoneware pipes up to 300 millimetres (11.8 in) in diameter, and RCC pipes for the mains and outfalls up to 2,100 millimetres (82.7 in) in diameter.

There are three main sewage treatment plants, which are located in the Vrishabavathy, Koramangala-Chellaghatta and Hebbal valleys. Two additional mini-plants have been built near Madiwala and Kempambudi.

== See also ==
- Infrastructure in Bangalore
- Kaveri River Water Dispute
- Sanitary sewer overflow
