= Narayana Nethralaya =

Eye hospital in Bengaluru, India

- Narayana Nethralaya, Bannerghatta road, Bengaluru (2026)

Geography
- Location: Multiple campuses in Bengaluru, Karnataka, India: Rajajinagar (main): #121/C, Chord Road, 1st ‘R’ Block, Rajajinagar, Bengaluru 560010; Bommasandra: #258/A, Hosur Road, Bommasandra, Bengaluru 560099; Bannerghatta Road: No.63, Next to Royal Meenakshi Mall, Hulimavu, Bannerghatta Road, Bengaluru 560076; Indiranagar: #1/1, 1st Main, Binnamangala, Defence Colony, 100 Feet Road, Indiranagar, Bengaluru 560038; Whitefield (opened February 2025): Plot 3-C, Phase I, Doddenakkundi Industrial Area, Mahadevapura P.O., Next to Seetharamapalya Metro Station, Bengaluru 560048

History
- Founded: 1982 (by K. Bhujang Shetty)

Links
- Website: www.narayananethralaya.org

Narayana Nethralaya is a super-specialty eye care hospital based in Bengaluru, Karnataka, India. The institution operates several campuses across the city and provides ophthalmic services, along with medical research and community-based eye care programs.

== History ==
The hospital was founded in 1982 by ophthalmologist Dr. K. Bhujang Shetty as a small clinic in Srirampuram. A larger facility was established in Rajajinagar in 1993. Additional campuses were later opened in Bommasandra, Indiranagar, Bannerghatta Road, and Whitefield.

In 2022, Narayana Nethralaya's free eye hospital was established in Tumkur inaugurated by the Chief Minister of Karnataka.

Narayana Nethralaya has been actively involved in community outreach and eye donation programmes since its early years. The Dr. Rajkumar Eye Bank, established in 1994 at the hospital's Rajajinagar campus and inaugurated by actor Dr. Rajkumar, has facilitated thousands of corneal transplants.

The eye bank gained further prominence after eye donations by members of Dr. Rajkumar's family. Parvathamma Rajkumar donated her eyes to the bank in 2017. Following the death of actor Puneeth Rajkumar in October 2021 and his eye donation, which restored sight to four people, there was a significant surge in pledges. Narayana Nethralaya, which operates the eye bank, recorded nearly 1.28 lakh new eye pledges in the two years after his donation, along with the collection of 3,989 eyes for transplantation.

== Services and facilities ==
Narayana Nethralaya provides specialised treatment in areas such as cataract, refractive surgery, retina, glaucoma, cornea, pediatric ophthalmology, and oculoplasty. The hospital has received NABH accreditation.

Narayana Nethralaya provides emergency ophthalmic care, including treatment of firecracker related eye injuries that occur during festivals such as Diwali. The hospital has reported treating dozens of such cases annually in Bengaluru.

The hospital performs corneal transplantations and operates the Dr. Rajkumar Eye Bank to address corneal blindness. India faces a large gap between the demand and supply of donor corneas, with millions waiting for transplants nationwide.

== Programs and research ==
The hospital runs KIDROP, a free tele ROP screening program launched in 2008 in partnership with the Government of Karnataka to prevent blindness in premature infants in rural areas. The program has expanded nationwide.

Research activities are conducted through the GROW Research Laboratory. The hospital has developed gene therapies for ocular diseases and received approval for human clinical trials. In 2025, it announced plans to reduce gene therapy costs by 80%.

Other initiatives include collaboration on an augmented reality device for low vision patients and the operation of eye banks such as the Dr. Rajkumar Eye Bank
