= SDS Tuberculosis Sanatorium =

Shanthabai Devarao Shivaram Tuberculosis Sanatorium and Rajiv Gandhi Institute of Chest Diseases

Geography
- Location: Bengaluru, Karnataka, India
- Coordinates: 12°55′2.19″N 77°37′22.37″E

Organisation
- Type: Specialist
- Affiliated university: Rajiv Gandhi University of Health Sciences

Services
- Speciality: Cardio Thoracic and Chest Diseases

History
- Founded: 1948; 78 years ago

Links
- Website: rgicd.karnataka.gov.in
- Lists: Hospitals in India

The SDS Tuberculosis Sanatorium and Rajiv Gandhi Institute of Chest diseases is a government institute specializing in treating tuberculosis and other chest diseases. The SDS TRC and RAJIV GANDHI Institate of Chest Diseases is housed on a sprawling campus near Hosur Road in Bengaluru.

SDS Tuberculosis Sanatorium is named after the wife of philanthropist Devarao Shivaram as Shanthabai Devarao Shivaram Tuberculosis Sanatorium.

Later, as it became a teaching hospital associated with the Bangalore Medical College and Research Institute, and under development plans of the Government of Karnataka, it was called Rajiv Gandhi Institute of Chest Diseases.

It is located adjoining the Indira Gandhi Institute of Child Health and the NIMHANS campus.

It is an institute focused on treating chest diseases. Attributed to the hospital is its treatment of tuberculosis which is a major cause of mortality and morbidity in the region. Specialised treatment of tuberculosis and its varied complications are dealt with medically and if need surgically. It also functions as a chest injury and trauma care referral hospital.

Undergraduate students in the MBBS and Respiratory therapy, course and post graduate students from the medicine, surgery and allied departments are posted on rotation basis for a definite period for gaining clinical and surgical experience in identifying, treating and following up pulmonary disease.
