= T. K. Sreepada Rao =

Indian nephrologist (born 1943)

T K Sreepada Rao
- Born: 4 June 1944 (age 82); Kolar, India
- Education: Bangalore Medical College, Bangalore
- Known for: Drug related Nephropathy
- Scientific career
- Fields: Medicine
- Workplaces: State University of New York (SUNY); Downstate Medical Center

Notes
- His eldest brother was the kannada novelist T K Ramarao

T. K. Sreepada Rao (born 4 June 1943) is an Indian-American nephrologist and academic. His biggest scientific achievement is discovering two new renal diseases: nephropathy associated with intravenous heroin addiction in early 1970s, and nephropathy associated with HIV infection in early 1980s. He successfully transported two cadaver donor kidneys from New York to Bombay and participated in the renal transplantation. He has more than 130 scientific publications to his credit. He is one of the few international medical graduates who has a tenured professorship in a medical school in the United States.

== Early life ==
Rao was born in a Madhwa family in Kolar, Karnataka, India. He was the fifth child of T. K. Krishnamurthy Rao and Nagamma. His father was a railway station master who died of a heart attack when Rao was six years old. His eldest brother was the popular Kannada author and novelist T K Ramarao

His early schooling was in Channapatna, Karnataka. He graduated from high school in First Class, establishing a record for the highest marks scored in Channapatna, and in the top 15 in Karnataka State. He graduated in first class in pre-university studies at National College, Bengaluru in Bangalore, and was admitted to Bangalore Medical College. He stayed in Ramakrishna Vidhyarthi Mandiram throughout his student career.

He completed his medical degree from Bangalore Medical College as the top student with five gold medals. After completing one year of house surgeoncy, he left for the United States in June 1967. He completed four years of medical residency at New Jersey College of Medicine hospitals in Newark and East Orange, New Jersey.

== Career ==
From 1971 to 1973, he was a fellow in renal medicine at State University of New York Downstate Medical Center, and Kings County Hospital. After passing the American Board of Internal Medicine, he was awarded a fellowship from the American College of Physicians. Subsequently, he was also board-certified in the sub-specialty of Nephrology. During his fellowship, he published his original work on heroin-associated nephropathy inThe New England Journal of Medicine. In 1984, he described for the first time renal disease in patients with acquired immunodeficiency syndrome (AIDS). His original work, "AIDS Associated Nephropathy", was published in The New England Journal of Medicine in 1984.

Rao started working at SUNY Downstate Medical Center as a nephrologist. He was promoted to professor of medicine and associate director of renal diseases. He was also the director of hemodialysis services at Kings County Hospital and a consultant in nephrology at Brooklyn Veterans Administration Hospital. He has published more than 130 scientific articles and chapters in textbooks. He is the founding member, past president, board of trustees, and CME chairman of the American Association of Physicians Queens and Long Island chapter.

Rao was the nephrologist who cared for Jayaprakash Narayan when he visited the United States. He was also a nephrologist in charge of M. G. Ramachandran, chief minister of Tamil Nadu, and Chenna Reddy, chief minister of Andhra Pradesh, both of whom underwent renal organ transplantation at Downstate Medical Center. He was also a consultant for the Governor of Pondicherry, who suffered renal insufficiency.

Rao was awarded honorary degrees from Madras University and Manipal University. He has been honored by the Indian Society of Nephrology and the American Nephrologists of Indian Origin, Nassau County, New York.

== Personal life ==
Rao is married to Pushpa and has two children. He lives in Long Island, New York. He is a member of the Indian Association of Long Island, and the Bangalore Medical College Alumni Association.

== Selected publications ==
- Rao, TK Sreepada (2004). "Human Immunodeficiency Virus in Patients with End Stage Renal Disease". In Hörl, Walter H; Koch, K M; Lindsay, Robert M; Ronco, Claudio; Winchester, J F (eds.). Replacement of Renal Function by Dialysis. Springer. ISBN 978-1-4020-0083-6.
