= M. C. Albuquerque =

Indian physician

- M. C. Albuquerque, from a 1918 photograph.
- Born: Goa
- Other names: Mary C. Albuquerque, MC Albuquerque
- Occupations: Physician, hospital administrator
- Known for: Medical superintendent, Vanivilas Hospital for Women and Children in Bangalore (1935-1948)

Mary C. Albuquerque (born about 1890 – died after 1952), known professionally as M. C. Albuquerque or MC Albuquerque, was an Indian physician. She was medical superintendent of the Vanivilas Women and Children Hospital in Bangalore from 1937 to 1948.

== Early life ==
Albuquerque was from Goa. She trained as a doctor at Madras Medical College, and in England at the London School of Medicine for Women, where she earned a diploma in medicine, surgery, and midwifery in 1916. In 1938, she was admitted as a member of the Royal College of Obstetricians and Gynaecologists.

== Career ==
During World War I, Albuquerque was a resident medical officer on the staff of the Essex County Hospital in Colchester; she and Flora Nihal Singh were the first women doctors and the first Asian doctors on the staff.

On her return to India, Albuquerque worked with Jerusha Jhirad at the Bangalore Maternity Hospital, as senior obstetrician from 1922 to 1925. After Jhirad left for Bombay, Albuquerque became senior medical officer at the hospital. In 1935 she was appointed medical superintendent at the new Vanivilas Women and Children Hospital. She established the hospital's nursing school and dormitory for nurses. She served on the faculty of the medical school at the University of Mysore.

Albuquerque retired from Vanivilas in 1948, but continued practicing as a physician. She was an adviser to the Mysore State Medical Department. She advocated for the establishment of the All-India Tuberculosis Institute. She was honored by the Mysore State government with the title "Sastra Vaidya Praveen". She was a member of the local reception committees when the Indian Science Congress met in Bangalore in 1932 and in 1951. In 1953, she was president of the Bangalore branch of the All-India Women's Food Council.
