= Remya =

Remya may refer to:

- Remya Nambeeshan (born 1986), Indian actress.
- Remya, a genus of plants in the family Asteraceae.

== See also ==
- Ramya (disambiguation)
