= Hebbal Lake =

Hebbal Lake may refer to:

- Hebbal Lake, Bengaluru, a lake in Karnataka, India
- Hebbal Lake, Mysore, Karnataka, India
- Hebbal Reservoir, Heggadadevankote, Heggadadevankote Taluk, Mysore district, Karnataka, India
