= Ramya Ramana =

American poet (born 1995)

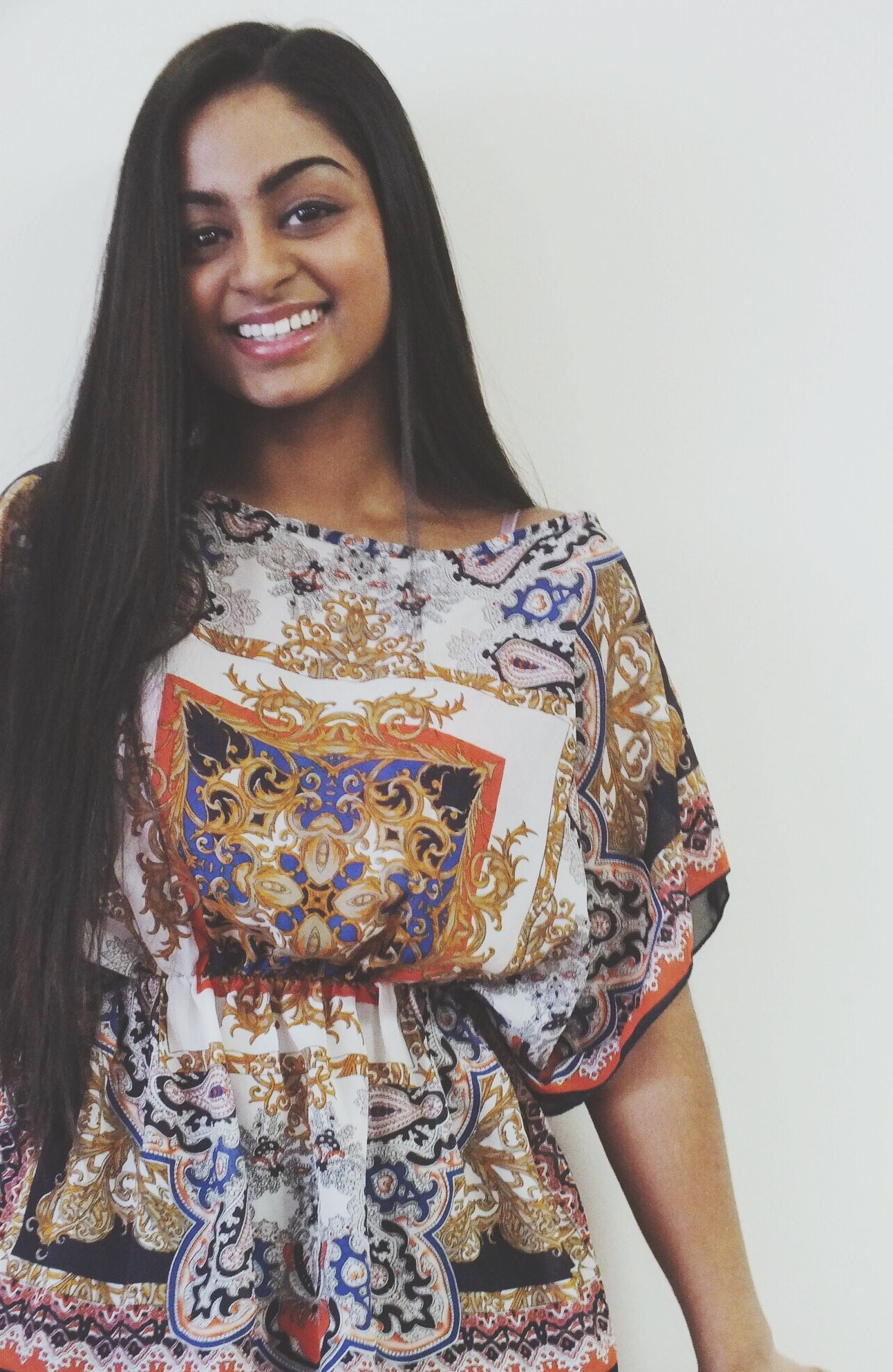
- Born: March 3, 1995 (age 31)
- Education: St. John's University
- Occupation: Poet
- Years active: 2014–present
- Known for: Youth Poet Laureate
- Website: ramyaramana.me

Ramya Ramana (born March 3, 1995) is an American poet based in New York City. Ramana is a winner of the Youth Poet Laureate of New York City award. In 2015, Ramana was invited to participate in a local event in Guyana hosted by One Billion Rising a domestic violence awareness organization.

== Career ==
In 2014, Ramana won the New York Knicks Poetry Slam with a scholarship to St. John’s University. In January 2014, Ramya was invited to read a poem titled New York City at the inauguration ceremony for Mayor Bill de Blasio. Ramana also appeared in a TV show Verses & Flow which was aired in 2014.

As a Youth Poet Laureate, Ramana has been working with the New York City Campaign Finance Board’s voter education campaign. In March 2014, she performed at the Joe's Pub at The Public.

== Notable poems ==
- Miss America poem
- New York City
- It Is Not Your Problem
- We Will No Longer Stay Silent to this Classism
- Don't Drown Her in the Baptism
