= Ramya Mohan =

British doctor and psychiatrist

Dr Ramya Mohan
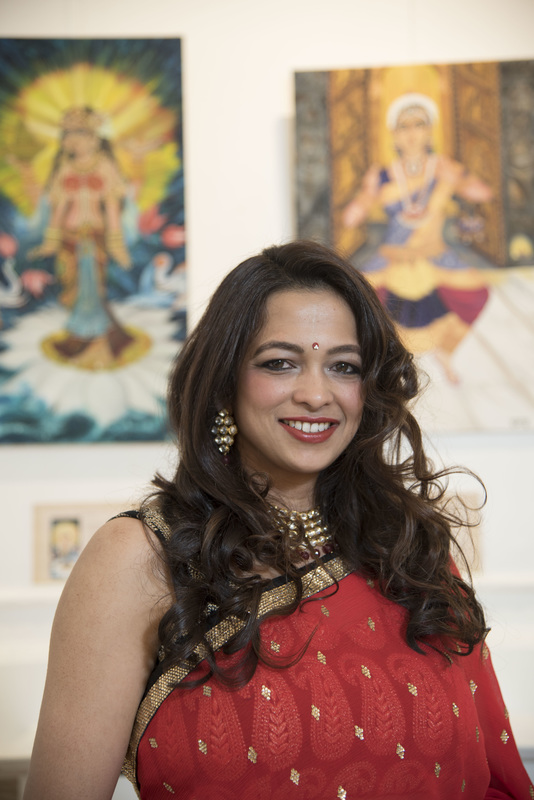
- Born: Bangalore, Karnataka, India
- Education: Bangalore Medical College and Research Institute
- Occupation: Clinical Psychiatrist

Dr Ramya Mohan is a British doctor, psychiatrist, educator, musician and an artist of Indian Kannada origin. She studied at Bangalore Medical College (BMC) in Bangalore, India and later worked as a senior consultant in the UK for the National Health Service.

== Early life ==
Mohan was involved in art before going to medical college. She is an alumna of Bangalore Medical College (BMC) where she obtained her degree in M.B.B.S. In 1993, she won the Prime Minister's medal for creating a marble art mural for Republic Day. The award was presented to her by then Prime Minister of India, P.V. Narasimha Rao. She later discovered during her psychiatric training she could use art to aid recovery and communication in children.

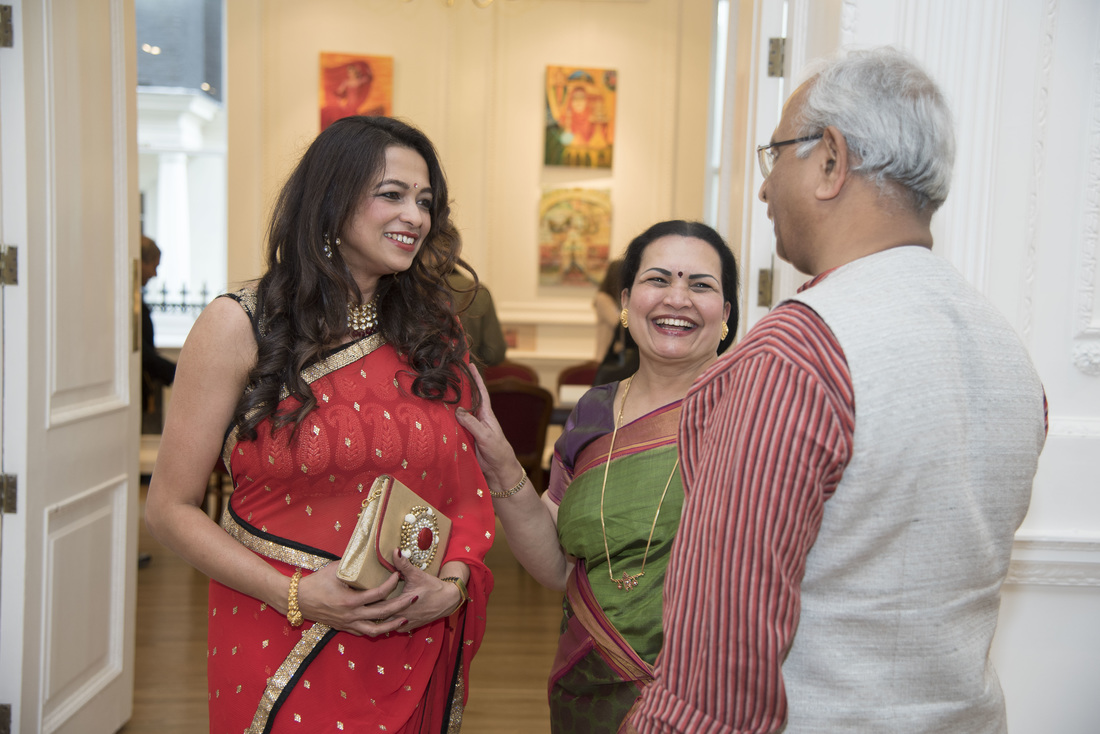
Dr. Ramya Mohan interacting with guests at ‘VISMAYAA: Discovering the artist within’ an artwork collection and Community Mosaic Art Project held at The Nehru Centre, Mayfair, United Kingdom.

== Career ==
=== Medicine and Psychiatry ===
She is known for her work in the field of Clinical Psychiatry by integrating Neuroscience with the Creative Arts. Since 2008, she has been with National Health Service as a Senior Consultant Psychiatrist and a Medical Educator. She employs her self-developed therapeutic technique ‘CAPE: Creative Arts for Processing Emotions’ where she uses music & art as media to support emotional well-being, cure mental illnesses and aid personality development. In 2015, she founded iMANAS London, an organisation created to promote the integration of medicine, arts and neuroscience.

In May 2016, she released her self-guided therapeutic technique ‘CAPE: Creative Arts for Processing Emotions’ in collaboration with the Bharatiya Vidya Bhavan, musicians and linguists. This technique has a basis in her Neuroscience research on music, emotions and the brain (Presented at the European Psychiatric Association conference, the Royal College of Psychiatrists International Conference and published in European Psychiatry, bringing together Eastern and Western music and well-evidenced therapeutic techniques like mindfulness, guided imagery and CBT to support self-guided emotional processing and regulation. Mohan has composed the vocals and lent her voice to this project; a collaborative effort with well-known musicians and linguists. CAPE has been referenced and featured in various media publications namely The Huffington Post and Deccan Herald.

=== Singing-songwriting and music composing ===
Mohan has received formal training in Carnatic music and Hindustani Music. She has performed in classical, semi-classical and contemporary music at venues in the UK and India. In 2016 she released an album, CAPE (in the United Kingdom and India) of Western and Indian music with vocals in Sanskrit. The album was designed to allow the listener to cope with mental illness.

=== Art ===
Mohan's artwork has been displayed in exhibitions in UK and India. In May 2016, she spoke on BBC Radio 3's In Tune, about her art exhibition at the Nehru Centre in London.

== Recognition ==
In May 2016, Mohan was invited by the cultural wing of the Indian High Commission UK, Ministry of external affairs, to talk on the topic 'Science, Art and Creativity: A mosaic of the human mind’.

In September 2016, she was one of the contributors to the Mental Wealth Festival in London, which had participation by various individuals from the fields of medicine, arts, music, politics and community development.
