= A. N. Prabhu Deva =

Vice Chancellor of Bangalore University

A. N. Prabhu Deva is the former vice chancellor of Bangalore University. He was the director of Sri Jayadeva Institute of Cardiovascular Sciences and Research before getting appointed as VC of Bangalore University.
