= Oculoplasty =

Oculoplasty, or oculoplastic surgery, involves medical and surgical treatment for deformities and abnormalities of the eyelids, lacrimal (tear) system, orbit (bony cavity around the eye), and the adjacent face. This specialized branch of ophthalmology requires adherence to strict medical guidelines and legal frameworks to ensure patient safety and professional accountability.

== Types of Oculoplastic Procedures ==
- Eyelid Surgery: Eyelid surgery, also known as blepharoplasty, is perhaps the most common type of oculoplastic procedure. It involves the removal of excess skin, fat, or muscle from the eyelids to correct drooping lids and puffy bags.
- Tear Duct Surgery: When tear ducts are blocked or damaged, it can cause chronic tearing or infections. Tear duct surgery, such as dacryocystorhinostomy (DCR), aims to create a new drainage pathway for tears to alleviate these issues.
- Orbital Surgery: Orbital surgery deals with problems within the eye socket, or orbit. This can include the removal of tumors, treatment of fractures, or reconstruction following trauma.
- Cosmetic Oculoplasty: Cosmetic oculoplasty focuses on enhancing the appearance of the eyes and surrounding areas. This can range from eyelid lifts to brow lifts and even procedures to reduce wrinkles and fine lines around the eyes.

== See also ==
- EyeWiki
- Eye disease
- List of systemic diseases with ocular manifestations
- Eye surgery
- Optometry
- Orthoptics
- Eye care professional
