= Jacob Bolotin =

American physician

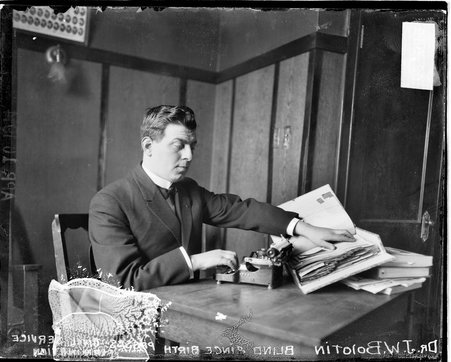
- Bolotin at his desk, 1914
- Born: January 3, 1888; Chicago, Illinois, US
- Died: April 1, 1924 (aged 36)
- Occupation: Physician
- Known for: First totally blind physician

Jacob W. Bolotin (January 3, 1888 – April 1, 1924) was the world's first totally blind physician.

Born in 1888 to a poor immigrant family in Chicago, United States, Bolotin fought prejudice and misconceptions about the capabilities of blind people in order to win acceptance to medical school and then into the medical profession. He fought his way into and through the Chicago Medical School, graduated with honors at 24, and became the world's first totally blind physician fully licensed to practice medicine. He was particularly recognized for his expertise on diseases of the heart and lungs. Bolotin used his many public speaking engagements to advocate for the employment of the blind and their full integration into society. After he died at the young age of 36, his funeral was attended by 5,000 people.

== Legacy ==
In 2007, a biography of Botolin, The Blind Doctor: The Jacob Bolotin Story by author Rosalind Perlman was published. In 2008, Perlman designated the National Federation of the Blind to present the Dr. Jacob Bolotin Award given to innovating individuals working in the field of blindness.
