= Bowring & Lady Curzon Hospitals =

Hospital in Bengaluru, Karnataka, India

Bowring and Lady Curzon Hospitals (BLCH) is a teaching hospital and autonomous university in Bengaluru, Karnataka, India. It was originally a medical institution belonging to Mysore State, but in 1884 it was made over to the Civil and Military Administration. This hospital was only the Civil Medical Institution of Bengaluru till 1890. It had accommodation for 104 beds, of which 80 were for men and 24 for women patients. Additional accommodation for female patients was provided by the donations contributed by philanthropic citizens and by the Government of India. Sri Atal Bihari Vajpayee Medical College and Research Institute inaugurated on 29 December 2020 is located close by.

Located in Shivajinagar in the city's central business district, the 152-year-old hospital has also taught students pursuing medical degrees since the late 19th century during the British Raj.

== History ==
The Bowring & Lady Curzon Hospitals was built on the plan of the Lariboisière Hospital in Paris and was formally opened in 1868 by Mr. Lewin Benthon Bowring, the then Commissioner of Mysore. It was originally a medical institution belonging to Mysore State, but in 1884 it was made over to the Civil and Military Administration. This hospital was only the Civil Medical Institution of Bengaluru till 1890. It had accommodation for 104 beds, of which 80 were for men and 24 for women patients. Additional accommodation for female patients was provided by the donations contributed by philanthropic citizens and by the Government of India. This additional hospital was named Lady Curzon Hospital. The two hospitals were fully equipped with X - ray and Pathological laboratory. They were both placed in the combined charge of one Superintendent in 1911. In 1947, the Civil and Military station were retroceded to the Mysore Durbar. As a consequence of this, the Bowring & Lady Curzon Hospitals along with other medical institutions of the area were placed under the administrative control of the Mysore Medical Department.

Research activity : The institute played active role during COVID-19 pandemic not only by providing healthcare services but also enriching medical science through its research work.

== Vintage Gallery ==
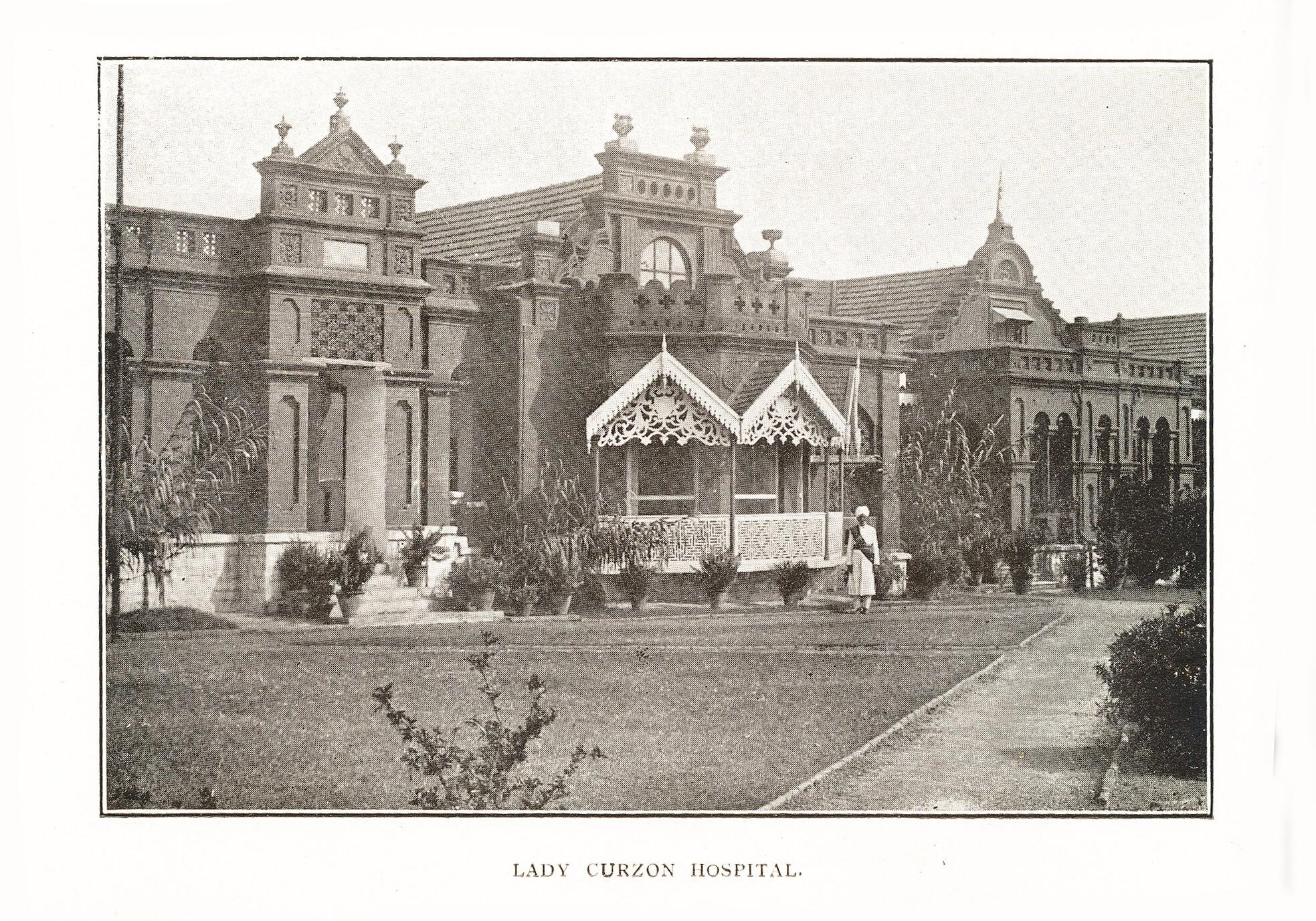
Lady Curzon Hospital, Bengaluru by CH Doveton (1900)
