= Kidwai (disambiguation) =

The Kidwai or Qidwai are a community of Muslims in South Asia.

Kidwai may also refer to:

== People ==
- Akhlaqur Rahman Kidwai (1921–2016), Indian chemist
- Anis Kidwai (1906–1982), Indian writer
- Ayesha Kidwai, Indian theoretical linguist
- Begum Siddiqa Kidwai (1914–1964), Indian politician
- Fareed Mahfooz Kidwai (born 1944), Indian politician
- Khalid Kidwai, Bollywood film producer
- Mohsina Kidwai (born 1932), Indian politician
- Naina Lal Kidwai (born 1957), Indian banker
- Rafi Ahmed Kidwai (1894–1954), Indian politician
- Rasheed Kidwai (born 1967), Indian journalist
- Sadiq-ur-Rahman Kidwai, Indian writer
- Saleem Kidwai (1951– 2021), Indian medieval historian
- Saleem Kidwai (Muslim Council of Wales), Welsh Muslim
- Shafey Kidwai (born 1960), Indian academic

== Other uses ==
- Kidwai Memorial Institute of Oncology, hospital in India
- Kidwai Nagar, neighbourhood in Kanpur, Uttar Pradesh, India
  - Kidwai Nagar Assembly constituency, assembly constituency of Uttar Pradesh
  - Delhi Public School, Kidwai Nagar, school in India
- Rafi Ahmed Kidwai Award, Indian agriculture award
- Kidwaipuri, neighbourhood in Patna, Bihar, India
- Anwar Kidwai, fictional professor in the 2012 Indian film Ek Tha Tiger, portrayed by Roshan Seth
