= Anwar Jamal Kidwai =

Indian academic administrator and civil servant

6th Vice-Chancellor of Jamia Millia Islamia
- In office 1978–1983
- Chancellor: Mohammad Hidayatullah
- Preceded by: Masud Husain Khan
- Succeeded by: Ali Ashraf

Secretary to the Government of India of Ministry of Information and Broadcasting
- In office 1980's – --
- Preceded by: unknown
- Succeeded by: unknown

Secretary to the Government of India of Ministry of Science and Technology
- In office 1972–1973
- Succeeded by: Dr. A Ramachandran

Personal details
- Born: 1917 Barabanki, United Provinces of Agra and Oudh, British India
- Died: 3 January 1996 (aged 78–79)
- Parent: Wilayat Ali (father)
- Relatives: Anis Kidwai (sister); Rafi Ahmed Kidwai (uncle); Shafi Ahmed Kidwai (Brother in law)

Anwar Jamal Kidwai (1917–1996) was an Indian civil servant and educator who served as the sixth Vice Chancellor of Jamia Millia Islamia, from 1978 to 1983. He established the A.J.K. Mass Communication Research Centre and also served as the first Chairman of Film and Television Institute of India.

== Early life and education ==
Anwar Jamal was born in 1917 in Barabanki at United Provinces of Agra and Oudh during British rule, into the Kidwai family. He was the youngest son of Indian satirist Wilayat Ali. His older sister Anis Kidwai was a writer and politician who served as a member of Rajya Sabha, the upper house of Indian parliament.

== Career ==
He worked in the National Herald followed by a six month stint with the BBC after which he joined The Hindustan Times and served as a war correspondent during the Japanese occupation of Indonesia.

Kidwai initially joined Indian Foreign Service in 1947 on invitation by Jawaharlal Nehru. After 10 years, he quit the foreign service and later joined as an officer of the Central Secretariat Service. As a civil servant, he served as the deputy secretary to the Ministry of External Affairs and later as Educational and Scientific Adviser to the High Commission of India in London.

He then served as the Secretary to the Government of India in Ministry of Information and Broadcasting and Ministry of Science and Technology. He retired in 1983.

=== Jamia Millia Islamia ===
In 1978, he was appointed the vice chancellor of Jamia Millia Islamia, a central university, where he established A.J.K. Mass Communication Research Centre in collaboration with James Beveridge. He also established a hostel for working women.

Kidwai expanded academic disciplines and facilities at Jamia Millia Islamia, launching faculties in Humanities, Languages, Natural Sciences, Social Sciences, and creating a Centre for Coaching & Career Planning (1983) catering to student enrichment and support.

==== Support for Palestine and Political Advocacy ====
In 1982, during Lebanon’s escalation and the violence inflicted on Palestinian refugees, Kidwai publicly campaigned within Delhi’s academic circles for revoking Menachem Begin’s Nobel Peace Prize as a stance of solidarity with Palestine. He saw the struggle of the Palestinians as spiritually resonant with early Islamic revolutionary history, and evoked figures like Ho Chi Minh when addressing the Palestinian cause.

Palestinian leader Yasser Arafat visited Jamia on May 23, 1982, invited directly by Kidwai, who addressed him with deep reverence—drawing on Jamia’s heritage as an institution born in a freedom struggle. In later years, Jamia established two halls—Yasser Arafat Hall and Edward Said Hall—near the Vice Chancellor’s office to commemorate solidarity with oppressed intellectuals and political figures.

== Personal life ==
He died on 3 January 1996.
