= List of chancellors and vice-chancellors of Jamia Millia Islamia =

The chancellor of Jamia Millia Islamia is the ceremonial head of the university. The vice-chancellor of Jamia Millia Islamia is the executive head of the university.

== Chancellors of JMI ==
The chancellors of JMI are as follows.

1. Hakim Ajmal Khan (1920–1927)
2. Mukhtar Ahmed Ansari (1928–1936)
3. Abdul Majeed Khwaja (1936–1962)
4. Zakir Husain (1963–1969)
5. Mohammad Hidayatullah (1969–1985)
6. Khurshed Alam Khan (1985–1990)
7. S. M. H. Burney (1990–1995)
8. Khurshed Alam Khan (1995–2001)
9. Fakhruddin T. Khorakiwala (2002–2011).
10. Mohammad Ahmed Zaki (2012–2017)
11. Najma Heptulla (2017- 2023)
12. Mufaddal Saifuddin (2023–Incumbent)

== Vice chancellors of JMI ==
The vice chancellors of JMI are as follows.

1. Mohammad Ali Jouhar (1920–1923)
2. Abdul Majeed Khwaja (1923–1925)
3. Dr. Zakir Husain (1926–1948)
4. Mohammad Mujeeb (1948–1973)
5. Masud Husain Khan (1973–1978)
6. Anwar Jamal Kidwai (1978–1983)
7. Ali Ashraf (1983–1989)
8. Syed Zahoor Qasim (1989–1991)
9. Bashiruddin Ahmad (1991–1996)
10. Mohammad Ahmed Zaki (1997–2000)
11. Syed Shahid Mahdi (2000–2004)
12. Mushirul Hasan (2004–2009)
13. Najeeb Jung (2009–2013)
14. Talat Ahmad (2014–2018)
15. Najma Akhtar (2019–2023) (First women Vice-Chancellor)
16. Mazhar Asif (2024– )
