= Pravara Rural Education Society =

The Pravara Rural Education Society (PRES) was established in July 1964 at Pravara, Loni, a large village in Maharashtra state in India. It is located between Pune to the South and Nashik to the North. The founder, Padamshri Vitthalrao Vikhe Patil, was a leader of the cooperative movement. The society's first school was an English medium school.

Padam Bhushan Sh Balasaheb Vikhe Patil is the chairman of the society.And Rajendra Bhane Patil is an [ Executive Chairman ]

== Progress ==
The Pravara Rural Education Society operates 11 technical colleges, 6 senior colleges, 6 English medium schools including a Sainik School and 32 Marathi medium schools. In all, over 40,000 students are presently on the rolls of these institutions.

== Major institutions ==
=== Technical colleges ===
- Pravara Rural Engineering College, Loni
- Sri Visvesvaraya Institute of Technology, Chincholi, Nashik.
- Padamshri Vitthalrao Vikhe Patil Institute of Technology & Engineering, Loni
- Pravara Rural College of Pharmacy, Loni
- Pravara Women's College of Pharmacy, Chincholi
- Pravara Rural College of Architecture, Loni
- College of Pharmacy, Chincholi
- Industrial Training Institute, and Women Industrial Training Institute, Loni
- HAL-Pravara Aviation Institute, Ozar, Nashik

=== Senior colleges ===
- Padamshri Vikhe Patil College of Arts, Science and Commerce, Pravaranagar
- Arts, Commerce and Science College, Satral
- Pravara Women's College of Home Science and BCA, Loni
- College of Agricultural Biotechnology, Loni
- Pravara Rural College of Education, Loni
- College of Physical Education, Loni

=== English medium schools ===
- Pravara Public School, Pravaranagar
- Pravara Central Public School, Pravaranagar
- Padamshri Vitthalrao Vikhe Patil Sainik School, Loni
- Pravara Girls English Medium School & Junior College, Loni
- Pravara High School, Kolhar
- Padmashri Balasaheb Vikhe Patil International School, Loni
