= Subhadra Joshi =

Indian politician (1919–2003)

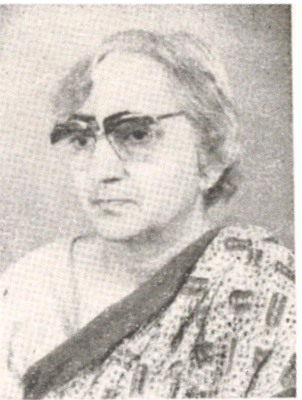
- Portrait of Subhadra Joshi

Personal details
- Born: Subhadra Datta; 23 March 1919 Sialkot, Punjab, British India
- Died: 30 October 2003 (aged 84) Delhi, India
- Education: Maharaja Girls' School, Lady Maclegan High School, Kanya Mahavidyalaya, and Forman Christian College

Subhadra Joshi (née Datta; 23 March 1919 – 30 October 2003; Sialkot, Punjab) was an Indian freedom activist, politician and parliamentarian from Indian National Congress. She took part in the 1942 Quit India movement, and later remained the president of the Delhi Pradesh Congress Committee (DPCC). She was from Sialkot (now in Pakistan).

== Early life and education ==
She attended the Maharaja Girls' School, Jaipur, the Lady Maclegan High School, Lahore and the Kanya Mahavidyalaya at Jalandhar. She obtained a master's degree in Political Science from the Forman Christian College, Lahore. Her father V.N Datta was a police officer with the Jaipur State and a cousin, Krishnan Gopal Datta was an active Congressman in Punjab.

== Career ==
=== Role in the freedom struggle ===
Attracted by the ideals of Gandhiji, she visited his Ashram at Wardha when she was studying in Lahore. As a student she took part in the Quit India Movement in 1942 and worked with Aruna Asaf Ali. During this time, she relocated to Delhi where she went underground and edited a journal ‘Hamara Sangram’. She was arrested and after serving time at the Lahore Women's Central Jail, she started working among industrial workers.

During the communal riots that ensued in the wake of Partition she helped set up a peace volunteer organization,‘Shanti Dal’ which became a powerful anti-communal force during those troubled times. Joshi was made the party convenor. She also organized rehabilitation of evacuees from Pakistan. Anis Kidwai in her book, "In Freedom's Shade", mentions many instances when she and Subhadra Joshi would rush to different villages around Delhi to try and stop the forced evacuation of Muslims and maintain peace. She was also very close to Rafi Ahmad Kidwai and recalled his role in encouraging her in politics in an interview she gave in December 1987. In a 1998 interview with Sagari Chhabra, Joshi talked about her work trying to maintain communal harmony during the Partition.

=== Role in Independent India ===
Subhadra Joshi was an ardent secularist who dedicated her life to the cause of communal harmony in India. She spent several months in Sagar when the first major post independence riots of India broke out there in 1961. The following year she set up the 'Sampradayikta Virodhi Committee' as a common anti-communal political platform and in 1968, launched the journal Secular Democracy in support of the cause. In 1971, the Qaumi Ekta Trust was established to further the cause of secularism and communal amity in the country.

=== As a parliamentarian ===
She was a parliamentarian for four terms from 1952 to 1977 - from Karnal (Haryana) in 1952, Ambala (Haryana) in 1957, Balrampur (Uttar Pradesh) in 1962 and from the Chandni Chowk Lok Sabha constituency in 1971. After defeating Atal Behari Vajpayee in Balrampur in 1962, she then lost 1967 Lok Sabha election to him from the same seat. She won Lok Sabha election from Chandani Chowk in Delhi in 1971 but lost from the same seat in 1977 to Sikandar Bakht. She became the first woman MP from the state of Punjab when she got elected from Karnal (then in Punjab). In an interview given in 1987, she recalled how it was decided that she should stand for the election from Karnal. In the 1962 election, she defeated Atal Bihari Vajpayee, who was the sitting MP from Balrampur. She made important contributions to the passage of Special Marriage Act, the Nationalization of Banks, Abolition of Privy Purses and the Aligarh University Amendment Act. She introduced the Code of Criminal Procedure (Amendment) Bill, 1957 (Bill No. 90 dated 19 December 1957) "to remove the hardship caused to a woman in spending money on litigation when her husband commits the offence of bigamy". It was passed in 1960 and is one of only 15 Private Members' Bills passed since independence. Her crowning achievement however was her successful move to amend the code for Criminal Procedure that made any organized propaganda leading to communal tensions or enmity a cognizable offence. She is alleged to have had an affair with Indira Gandhi's husband, Feroze Gandhi.

On 29 March 1963, she moved a motion in the Lok Sabha to nationalize banks to mobilize the national resources after Sino-Indian War. On 6 September 1963, the motion was defeated with 119 against it and 27 supporting it.

She was awarded the Rajiv Gandhi Sadhbhavana Award given by the Rajiv Gandhi Foundation.

== Death and legacy ==
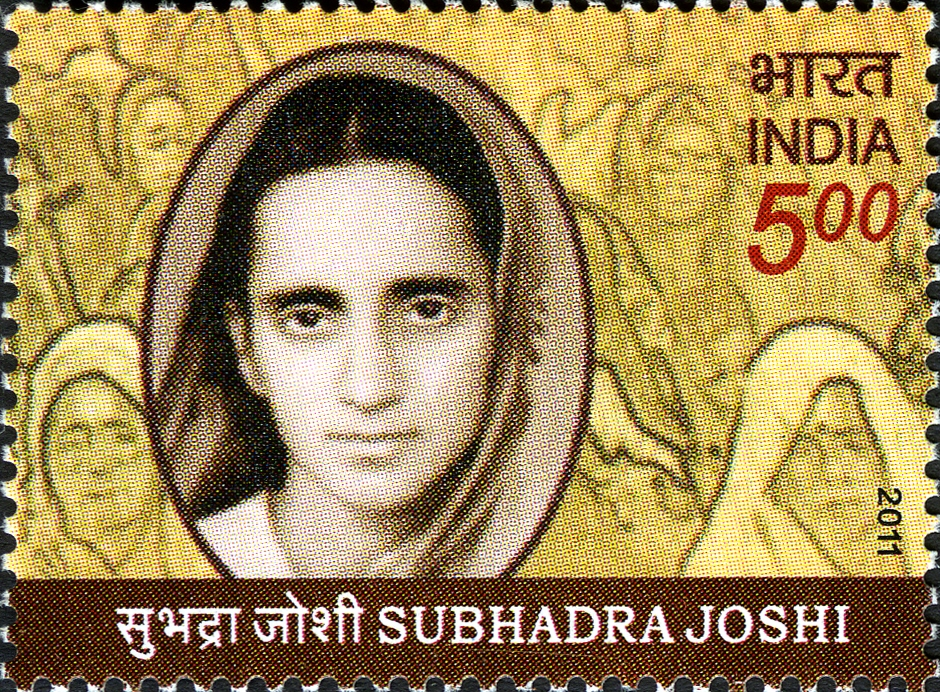
commemorative stamp, 2011

Subhadra Joshi died on 30 October 2003, at the Ram Manohar Lohia Hospital, Delhi, after a prolonged illness at the age of 84. She had no children. A commemorative stamp was issued in her honour by Department of Posts on her birth anniversary, 23 March 2011.
