= List of pharmacy colleges in India =

This is a list of government owned and privately owned pharmacy schools in India. The Colleges are Approved by Pharmacy Council Of India (PCI) for conduction of D.Pharma or B.Pharma Course.

== Andhra Pradesh ==
- A.S.N Pharmacy College, Guntur DisT
- Adarsha College of Pharmacy
- Annamacharya College of Pharmacy
- B.V.K. Junior College, Dwarkanagar
- Bapatla College of Pharmacy
- Chalapathi Institute of Pharmaceutical Sciences, Guntur
- Department of Pharmaceutical Sciences
- Dr. Samuel George Institute of Pharmaceutical Sciences, Thokapally Markapur
- Fathima Institute of Pharmacy, Pulivendula road, Kadapa
- Govt. Junior College, Srikakulam Dist
- Govt. Junior College, Anantpur Dist
- Govt. Junior College, Cuddapah Dist
- Govt. Junior College for Boys
- Govt. Junior College for Girls, Chittoor Dist
- Govt. Polytechnic for Women, East Godavari
- Govt. Polytechnic for Women, Anantpur Dist
- Hindu College of Pharmacy Guntur
- Institute of Pharmaceutical Technology
- KJR College of Pharmacy
- K.D.R. Govt. Polytechnic
- K.V.S.R. Siddharatha College of Pharmaceutical Sciences
- Kakateeya Junior College, Cuddapah Dist
- L.A. Govt, Junior College for Girls
- Malineni Lakshmaiah College of Pharmacy
- Nirmal College or Pharmacy, Buddayapalle (P.O.)
- Nirmala College of Pharmacy Guntur, Mangalagiri (Mdl)
- Raghavendra Institute of Pharmaceutical Education & Research (RIPER), Chiyyedu (PO) Anantapuram (Dt)
- Ramakrishna Junior College
- Rao's College of Pharmacy
- S.V.Govt.Polytechnic, Chittoor Dist
- Sarada College of Pharmaceutical Sciences
- Sasikanth Reddy College of Pharmacy
- Shir V.C. Memorial Polytechnic, Cuddapah Dist
- Shri Vishnu College of Pharmacy, West Godavari District
- Siddhartha College of Pharmaceutical Sciences, Siddhartha Nagar
- Sir C.R.Reddy College, West Godavari Dist
- Sree Vidyanikethan College of Pharmacy, A.Rangampet, Chittoor Dist.
- Sri Dwarakanath Junior College, Chittoor Dist
- Sri G.Pulla Reddy Govt. Polytechnic
- Sri P. Rami Reddy Memorial College of Pharmacy, Utukur
- Sri Padmavathi Mahila Visvavidyalaya, Chittoor District
- Sri Padmavathi School of Pharmacy, Bypass Road, Chittoor District
- Sri Padmavathi Women's Polytechnic, Chittoor Dist
- Sri Vasavi Institute of Pharmaceutical Sciences, West Godavari District
- Sri Venkateshwara College of Pharmacy, By the Side of Iron Yard
- Sri Venkateswara College of Pharmacy, RVS Nagar, Chittoor
- Swathi College of Pharmacy, next to Nellore toll plaza, Venkatachalam Post & Mandal, Nellore
- Vagdevi College of Pharmacy
- Vignan Pharmacy College
- Vignan's Institute of Pharmaceutical Sciences
- Vikas College of B.Pharmacy
- Vishwa Bharathi College of Pharmaceutical Sciences

== Arunachal Pradesh ==
- College of Pharmaceutical Sciences, Himalayan University, Itanagar, Arunachal Pradesh

== Assam ==
- Department of Pharmaceutical Sciences
- Institute of Pharmacy Assam Medical College
- Institute of Pharmacy Guwahati Medical College, Guwahati
- Institute of Pharmacy Silchar Medical College, Silchar

== Bihar ==
- B.R. Ambedkar Institute of Pharmacy Sciences
- Bihar College of Pharmacy
- Birla Institute of Technology
- Govt.Pharmacy Institute
- Kishanganj Pharmacy College
- Mother Teresa Institute of Pharmacy, P.O. Dhelwanm, Via-Lohia-Nagar
- Muzaffarpur Institute of Technology
- Patliputra College of Pharmacy, New Bailey Road
- R.L.S. Yadav College of Pharmacy, Kidwaipuri

== Chhattisgarh ==
- Columbia Institute of Pharmacy, Tekari
- Govt. Women's Polytechnic, Raipur
- Institute of Pharmaceutical Sciences
- Raigarh College of Pharmacy, Raigarh

== Dadra and Nagar Haveli ==
- SSR College of Pharmacy, Sayli, Silvassa

== Delhi ==
- Aditya College of Pharmacy, Vasant Gunj
- Baba Haridas College of Pharmacy, Jarodha Kalan
- Delhi Institute of Pharmaceutical Sciences and Research (DIPSAR)
- School of Pharmaceutical Sciences (SPS, DPSRU)
- Faculty of Pharmacy, Jamia Hamdard
- Maharaja Surajmal Institute of Pharmacy
- Mahatma Gandhi Institute Of Technology and Management (MGITI)
- St. Lawrence Pharmacy College, near Petrol Pump
- Subramaniam Bharati College of Science & Technology

== Goa ==
- Goa College of Pharmacy, Panaji

== Gujarat ==
- Kalol Institute of Pharmacy, Kalol, North Gujarat
- KV Virani institute of Pharmacy and Research Centre.
- Institute of Pharmacy, Nirma University, Ahmedabad
- A R College & G H Patel Institute of Pharmacy
- Atmiya Institute of Pharmacy, Rajkot
- B K Mody Government Pharmacy College
- C.U. Shah College of Pharmacy & Research, Kotharia Road
- Dr. Dayaram Patel Pharmacy College
- Faculty of Technology
- Indukaka Ipcowala College of Pharmacy
- Institute of Ayurvedic Pharmaceutical Sciences, Irwin Hospital Road
- K.B. Institute of Pharmaceutical Education & Research
- L.B. Rao Institute Of Pharmaceutical Education & Research
- L.J. Institute of Pharmacy, Ahmedabad
- L. M. College of Pharmacy
- Maliba Pharmacy College
- NIPER Ahmedabad, Thaltej
- Gandhinagar Institute of Pharmacy, Gandhinagar University
- Noble Pharmacy College, Junagadh
- Parul Institute of Pharmacy
- Pharmacy Department
- ROFEL Shri G.M. Bilakhia College of Pharmacy, VAPI-396191. (W) Ta: PARDI
- Shantilal Shah Pharmacy College, Gaurishankar Lake Road
- Shir B.M. Shah College of Pharmaceutical Education and Research
- Shree Maruti Kelavani Mandal Trust Managed Diploma Pharmacy College
- Shree S K Patel College of Pharm Edu & Res, Taluk & Dist. Mehsana
- Shri B.M. Shah College of Pharmacy, P.O. Box No. 12
- Shri G.M. Patel College of Pharmacy, Ramba Kanya Chhatralaya Campus, Highway
- Shri Sarvajanik Pharmacy College
- Smt. B.N.B. Swaminarayan Pharmacy College, Salvav, Vapi 396191 GJ
- Smt. Rupaben B. Patel Mahila Pharmacy College, Bhavnagar Road, Atkot, Jasdan Taluk
- Tolani Institute of Pharmacy, Nursery Garden, Ward 2/A, Adipur
- Vidyabharti Trust College of Pharmacy
- Bhagwan Mahavir College of Pharmacy, Surat.
- CK Pithawala Pharmacy College, Surat.

== Haryana ==
- Puran Murti College of Pharmacy, Sonipat ( Delhi- NCR )
- B.P.S. Mahila Polytechnic, Somepat Dist
- PM College of Pharmacy, Sonipat
- Jhankar Pharmacy College Gurgaon, Haryana India.
- Puran Murti Campus, Sonipat ( Delhi-NCR )
- B.S. Anangpuria Institute of Pharmacy
- Bharat Institute of Pharmacy
- Dehat Vikas College of Pharmacy, District Faridabad
- Department of Pharmaceutical Sciences
- Doon Valley Institute of Pharmacy & Medicine
- Faculty of Engineering & Technology
- Gandhi College of Pharmacy
- Govt. Polytechnic
- Govt. Polytechnic
- Govt. Polytechnic for Women
- Guru Gobind Singh College of Pharmacy
- GVM College of Pharmacy
- Hindu College of Pharmacy
- Jan Nayak Ch. Devi Lal Memorial College of B. Pharmacy
- Janta College of Pharmacy
- Kurukshetra University Institute of Pharmaceutical Sciences
- Lord Shiva College of Pharmacy
- Maharaja Agarsain Technical Institute
- Maharshi Pharmacy College, Taraori
- P.D.M. College of Pharmacy, Sarai Aurangabad, Bahadurgarh
- Pt.B.D. Sharma Post-Graduate
- R.K.S.D. College of Pharmacy
- Rajendra Institutes of Technology & Sciences
- Ram Gopal College of Pharmacy, Farrukhnagar Tehsil
- SDD Institute of Pharmacy
- Shri Baba Mast Nath Inst of Pharm Sci
- SGT COLLEGE OF PHARMACY, SGT UNIVERSITY

== Himachal Pradesh ==
- Government College of Pharmacy Rohru, Shimla, H.P
- Government College of Pharmacy Nagrota bagwan, kangra, H.P
- Government College of Pharmacy Rakar, kangra, H.P
- Government College of Pharmacy Seraj, Mandi, H.P
- Abhilashi College of Pharmacy
- Govt. Polytechnic
- Govt. Polytechnic for Women, Solan Dist
- Himalayan Institute of Pharmacy
- IEC School of Pharmacy, Baddi, Solan
- L.R. Institute of Pharmacy, Rajgarh roadhklh

== Jharkhand ==
- Bokaro Institute of Medical & Health Sciences, Baradih, Jainamore, Bokaro, ssmt College Koderma

== Karnataka ==
- Acharya & B.M Reddy College of Pharmacy, Hesaraghatta Road, Soladevanahalli
- Aditya Bangalore Institute of Pharmacy Education and Research, Yelahanka, Bangalore
- AECS Maaruti College of Pharmacy, Bannerghatta Road
- Al-Ameen College of Pharmacy
- Al-Falah College of Pharmacy
- Anupama College of Pharmacy, Mahalaxmipuram
- B.E.A's School of Pharmacy
- B.L.D.E. Association's College of Pharmacy
- B.L.D.E. Association's School of Pharmacy
- Bapuji Pharmacy College
- Basaveshwar College of Pharmacy
- Basaveshwara College of Pharmacy, Bidar Dist
- BES Institute of Pharmacy, Jayanagar
- Bharathi College of Pharmacy
- Oxbridge college of pharmacy (C.N.K. Reddy College of Pharmacy), mahadeshwar Nagar, herohalli cross, Magadi main road, Bangalore
- Chennigaramaih College of Pharmacy, Tumkur Dist
- CMR College of Pharmacy, HRBR Layout, 2nd Block
- College of Pharmaceutical Sciences
- College of Pharmacy, Sangolli Rayanna Nagar
- College of Pharmacy, CMH Road, Second Stage, Indiranagar, near Bata
- College of Pharmacy
- College of Pharmacy, Post Box No. 26
- D.R. Kari Gowda College of Pharmacy, Kuvempunagar
- Dayananda Sagar College of Pharmacy
- Dr H L Thimmegowda College of Pharmacy
- East West College of Pharmacy, 2nd Stage, Rajaji Nagar
- Farooquia College of Pharmacy, Tilak Nagar, Eidgah
- Friends Cultural Educational Society's, Thyagaraja Nagar
- G K M College of Pharmacy
- G.M. College of Pharmacy, Nelamangala, Bypass
- Golden College of Pharmacy
- Goutham College of Pharmacy
- Government College of Pharmacy
- H.K.E.S.'s College of Pharmacy
- Hillside College of Pharmacy and Research Centre
- Pharma Colleges in Karnataka
- Hanagal Shri Kumareshawr College of Pharmacy
- J S S College of Pharmacy
- K.C.T. College of Pharmacy, Qamar-ul Islam Colony, Roza
- K.L.E. Society's College of Pharmacy, Rajaijnagar
- K.L.E. Society's College of Pharmacy, J.N. Medical College Campus
- K.L.E. Society's College of Pharmacy, Gadag Dist
- K.L.E. Society's College of Pharmacy
- K.LE.'s College of Pharmacy
- K.R.E Society's Madam Mohan Harishchandra Goel Institute of Pharmacy, P.B. No. 53
- Karavali College of Pharmacy
- Karnataka College of Pharmacy
- Krupanidhi College of Pharmacy
- Luqman College of Pharmacy
- M.M.U. College of Pharmacy
- M S Ramaiah College of Pharmacy
- M.E.S College of Pharmacy, Arabic College Post
- M.M.J.G. College of Pharmacy, Gadag Dist
- Mallige College of Pharmacy, Chikkabanavara Post
- Maratha Mandal College of Pharmacy
- Milind Institute of Pharmacy
- Mohammadi College of Pharmacy
- Nargund College of Pharmacy, 100 ft Ring Road, Banashankari III Stage
- National College of Pharmacy
- NET Pharmacy College
- NGSM Institute of Pharmaceutical Sciences, Nanthoor
- Nitte Gulabi Shetty Memorial Institute of Pharmaceutical Sciences
- Niveditha College of Pharmacy, Bangalore road
- Noble College of Pharmacy, Karnataka
- Noorie College of Pharmacy
- The Oxford College of Pharmacy, Hongasandra, Begur Road
- P E S College of Pharmacy
- Pandey College of Pharmacy, Naubad
- Pavan College of Pharmacy, Pavan Nagar P.C. Halli Extn
- Priyadarshini College of Pharmacy, Hanumanthpura
- R.R.K. Society College of Pharmacy
- Raman College of Pharmacy, Kurubarahalli
- Rani Chennamma College of Pharmacy, Vaibhav Nagar
- RR College of Pharmacy, Chikkabanavara
- Rural College of Pharmacy
- S C S College of Pharmacy
- S J M College of Pharmacy
- S V E T S College of Pharmacy
- S. A. C. College of pharmacy, Hassan Dist
- S. A. C. College of pharmacy, Nagamangala Taluk
- S.B.D. Institute of Pharmacy
- S.E.S. Pharmacy College
- S.J.M.M. College of Pharmacy, P.B.No. 47
- S.J.R.E Society's School of Pharmacy, Race Course Road
- Sardar V.V. Patil School of Pharmacy
- Sardavilas College of Pharmacy
- Seshadripuram College of Pharmacy
- Shivaji School of Pharmacy
- Shree Devi College of Pharmacy, Mangaluru
- Shridevi Institute of Pharmaceutical Sciences, Tumakuru
- Shuttaria Institute of Pharmacy, Neelamangala, B.H. Road
- Siddalingeshwar College of Pharmacy, SYE Society
- Sonia Education Trust's College of Pharmacy
- Sree Krishna College of Pharmacy, Batawadi
- Sree Siddaganga College of Pharmacy
- Sri Adichunchanagiri College of Pharmacy
- Sri K V College of Pharmacy
- Sri Ramakrishna College of Pharmacy
- Sri Subrahmanya Swamy College of Pharmacyll
- Sri Vasavi Pharmacy College
- Sri Venkateshwara College of Pharmacy, Banashankari, Iind Stage
- Srinivas College of Pharmacy
- St John's Pharmacy College
- Tipu Sultan College of Pharmacy
- Togari Veeramallappa Memorial College of Pharmacy
- Trident Educational Society's Valley College of Pharmacy, J.C. Nagarpipe Line Road
- V.M.V.V.S. School of Pharmacy
- V.V.S.P.B. College of Pharmacy
- Vasavi Jnana Peeth College of Pharmacy, Vijay Nagar
- VES's Pharmacy College, Dharward Dist
- Vidya Vikas Trust's College of Pharmacy
- Vidya Siri College of Pharmacy
- Visveswarapura Institute of Pharmaceutical Sciences
- Vivekananda College of Pharmacy
- Vutkoor Laxmaiah College of Pharmacy

== Kerala ==
- A.J. College of Pharmacy
- A.M. College of Pharmacy, Karunagappally
- Al-Shifa College of Pharmacy
- Amrita School of Pharmacy, Ponekkara (P.O)
- Calicut Medical College
- Caritas College of Pharmacy
- Chemists College Of Pharmaceutical Sciences And Research, Ernakulam
- College of Pharmaceutical Sciences
- College of Pharmaceutical Sciences, Gandhinagar, P.O.
- College of Pharmaceutical Sciences
- College of Pharmacy
- College of Pharmacy, Ernakulam
- College of Pharmacy
- Crescent B.Pharm. College
- Dale View College of Pharmacy and Research Center
- Devaki Amma Memorial College of Pharmacy, Malappuram
- Fathima College of Pharmacy, Kallumthazham, Kilikollur
- Grace College of Pharmacy
- Institute of Pharmaceutical Sciences, Medical College P.O.,
- Jamia Salafiya Pharmacy College
- JDT Islam College of Pharmacy, Kozhikode
- John Enoch college of Pharmacy, Karamana
- K.T.N College of Pharmacy, Chalavara, Palakkad
- Maharaja College of Pharmacy
- Malik Deenar College of Pharmacy
- Mar Dioscorus College of Pharmacy, Sreekariyam P O,
- National College of Pharmacy Manassery
- Nehru College of Pharmacy, Thiruvilwamala
- Priyadarsini Institute of Para Medical Science
- Sree Krishna College of Pharmacy & Research Centre
- St. James College of Pharmaceutical Sciences, River Bank, Chalakudy
- St. Joseph's College of Pharmacy, Vadakamcherry
- T.D. Medical College
- West Fort College Of Pharmacy, Pottore, Thrissur

== Madhya Pradesh ==
- Adina College of Pharmacy, Sagar
- B R Nahata College of Pharmacy, Mandsaur.
- Bansal Diploma Pharmacy College
- College of Pharmacy, Rajendra Nagar, A.B. Road
- Department of Pharmaceutical Sciences
- Department of Pharmacy
- Devi Ahiya College of Pharmacy, near Jaora Compound
- Dr. Shri R.M.S. Institute of Science & Technology College of Pharmacy
- Govt. Kalaniketan (Polytechnic)
- Gry Institute of Pharmacy, Sarvar Deula Road, Borwan
- Guru Ramdas Khalsa Institute of Science & Technology (Pharmacy)
- Indore Institute of Pharmacy, Opposite Indian Institute of Management Rau
- Institute of Pharmaceutical Sciences
- Mahakal Institute of Pharmaceutical Studies, Station Road, Datana
- Malhotra College of Pharmacy, Gandhi Nagar Bypass
- Mittal Institute of Pharmacy, Bhopal
- NRI Institute of Pharmaceutical Science, (NIPS) Opp. Patel Nagar, Raisen Road
- NRI Institute of Pharmacy (NIP), Bhopal
- Oriental Institute of Science & Technology
- Ravi Shankar college of pharmacy, Bhopal
- R.K.D.F. Institute of Science & Technology
- Rishi Raj College of Pharmacy, Indore
- Rajiv Gandhi College of Pharmacy Kolar Road, Bhopal
- S.V.Govt. Polytechnic
- Sagar Institute of Pharmaceutical Sciences, Sagar
- Sagar Institute of Research, Technology & Science-Pharmacy (SIRTS-P)
- Shri G.S. Institute of Technology & Science, Indore
- Shri Ram Nath Singh
- Shriram College of Pharmacy, near Gwalior
- Smriti College of Pharmaceutical Education, near Dewas Naka, Indore
- Sun Institute of Pharmaceutical Education & Research (SIPER)
- Truba Institute of Pharmacy, Bhopal
- Ujjain Institute Of Pharmaceutical Sciences, Ujjain
- V.N.S. Institute of Pharmacy, Vidya Vihar, Neelbad, Bhopal

== Maharashtra ==
- A.I.T's Institute of Pharmacy, Pharmacy Nagar
- A.S.P.M.'s K.T. Patil College of Pharmacy
- A.S.P.M's Diploma IN Pharmacy Institute, Chaadwad
- Abasaheb Kakade College of Pharmacy
- Adarsh Shikshan Sanstha's College of Pharmacy
- Agnihotri Institute of Pharmacy
- Alard College of Pharmacy, near Rajiv Gandhi Infotek Park
- All India Shri Shivaji Memorial Society's College of Pharmacy, near R.T.O.
- Allana College of Pharmacy, near Poorna College Camp
- Amrutvahini Institute of Pharmacy, Dist. Ahmednagar
- Anand Charitable Sanstha's College of Pharmacy, Tq- Ashti
- Anna Saheb Ajmera College of Pharmacy (Women), Deopur
- Annasaheb Dange College of B.Pharmacy
- Annasaheb Ramesh Ajmera College of Pharmacy (Women)
- Arunamai College of Pharmacy, Mumarabad, Jalgaon
- Anuradha College of Pharmacy, Chikhli, Buldhana district
- Appasahib Birnale College of Pharmacy
- Armed Forces Medical College
- Arts Science, Commerce & Pharmacy
- B.V. Institute of Pharmacy
- Bhagawan Pharmacy College
- Bharati Vidyapeeth's College of Pharmacy
- Bharati Vidyapeeth's College of Pharmacy
- Bharati Vidyapeeth's Poona College of Pharmacy
- Bhausaheb Mulak College of D. Pharmacy, Umrer
- Bhinav Education Society's College of Pharmacy
- Bombay College of Pharmacy, Kalina, Mumbai
- C U Shah College of Pharmacy
- Channabasweshwar Pharmacy College
- Charak College of pharmacy & Research Wagholi, Pune
- College of Pharmacy, Pusad, Yavatmal District
- College of Pharmacy
- College of Pharmacy (Polytechnic), Post. Alore, Talq
- D.S.T.S. Mandal's College of Pharmacy
- Dayanand College of Pharmacy, Dayanand Education Society Campus
- Department of Chemical Technology
- Department of Pharmaceutical Sciences
- Deptt. Of Pharmaceutical Science, Amravathi Road
- Dr. Bhanuben Nanavati College of Pharmacy, Mithibai College Campus, V.M. Road
- Dr. L. H. Hiranandani College of Pharmacy
- Dr. J.J. Magdum Pharmacy College
- Dwarka Institute of Pharmacy
- Geetadevi Khandelwal Institute of Pharmacy, Dabki Road
- Godavari Shikshan Mandal's Asian Institute of Pharmacy, Survey No.326/2 Pathardi Road
- Gondia Education Society's Manoharbhai Patel Institute of Pharmacy
- Government College of Pharmacy, Amravati
- Government College of Pharmacy, Aurangabad
- Government College of Pharmacy, Karad
- Government College of Pharmacy, Ratnagiri
- Govt. Polytechnic
- Gulabrao Patil College of Pharmacy, near Govt. Milk Scheme, Miraj
- Gurunanak Technical Institute (Diploma in Pharmacy), Foundry & Namagar Nagar
- H K College of Pharmacy, Jogeshwari, Mumbai
- Indira College of Pharmacy, New Pune Mumbai Highway Tathwade
- Institute of Diploma in Pharmacy
- Institute of Pharmaceutical Education and Research
- Institute of Pharmacy
- Institute of Pharmacy
- Institute of Pharmacy, Deopur
- Institute of Pharmacy
- Institute of Pharmacy, Station Road Yavatmal
- J L Chaturvedi College of Pharmacy
- J.B.S.P. Mandar's Institute of Pharmacy
- J.E.S.'s Institute of Pharmacy, Durga Mata Road
- Jijamata Education Society's College of Pharmacy, Nandurbar
- K.D. Pawar College of Pharmacy
- K.D.C.A's Institute of Pharmacy, Ujalaiwadi
- K.E.S's College of Pharmacy, Manwad Road
- Kamala Nehru Polytechnic (pharmacy)
- Kamla Nehru Pharmacy
- Lokmanya Tilak Institute of Pharmaceutical Studies, Laxmi Nagar
- M.A.H. College of Pharmacy
- Maharashtra Shikshan Samiti's 'Maharashtra College of Pharmacy
- Mahatma Basweshwar Education Society's College Pharmacy, MIDC Area, Barshi Road
- MGV Mandal's College of Pharmacy, Panchvati
- Modern College of Pharmacy, Sector 21, Yamunanagar, Nigdi
- Modern College of Pharmacy (Ladies Only), Borhadewadi, A/P Moshi, Taluk. Haveli
- Moze college of Pharmacy, Wagholi, Pune
- Mula Education Society's College of Pharmacy
- Mumbai Educational Trust's Institute of Pharmacy
- N D M V P Samaj's College of Pharmacy
- N.T.V.S. Institute of Pharmacy, Dhule
- N.Y.S. Society's Nagpur College of Pharmacy
- Nagpur College of Pharmacy/Sharad Pawar College of Pharmacy, Nagpur
- Department College of Pharmacy, Nagpur
- Navyug Vidyapeeth Trust's College of Pharmacy
- NCRD's Sterling Institute of Pharmacy
- NSS College of Pharmacy, 94, Tardeo Road, M.P.Mill Compound
- Oriental College of Pharmacy, Sanpada, Navi Mumbai
- P S G V P Mandal's College of Pharmacy
- Padmashree Dr D Y Patil College of Pharmacy
- Padmashri Dr Vithalrao Patil Foundation's
- Pataldhamal Wadhwani College of Pharmacy
- Pravara Rural College of Pharmacy
- Principal K M Kundnani College of Pharmacy
- R C Patel College of Pharmacy
- Rajgad Dnyanpeeth's College of Pharmacy
- Raoji Naik Institute of Pharmacy, Buldhana
- Ravi Institute of Diploma in Pharmacy, Sirapeth
- S.A.S. Polytechnic (Pharmacy), Bhiwandi
- S.C.S.MS. Institute of Pharmacy
- S.M.B.T. College of Pharmacy, Igatpuri
- Saraswati Vidya Bhawan's College of Pharmacy
- Satara Polytechnic (Dept of Pharmacy), Mangalwar Peth
- Seth Govind Raghunath Sable College of Pharmacy
- Sharad Pawer College of Pharmacy
- Sharadchandra Pawar College of Pharmacy
- Shikshan Prasark Mandal's College of Pharmacy
- Shivnagar Vidya Prasarak Mandal's College of Pharmacy
- Shree Sant Muktabai Institute of Technology (Pharmacy), P.O.Box 132
- Shree Shahu Chhatrapati Shikshan Sanstha's, Dasara Chowk
- Shri C.S. Shikshan Sanstha's SCSSS College of Pharmacy
- Shri D.F. Lodha Pharmacy College, Chaadwad
- Shri K.R. Pandav Institute of Pharmacy
- Shri Sadashivrao Patil S. Sanstha College of Pharmacy
- Shri Sharda Bhavan Education Society's College of Pharmacy, Seva Kendra
- Shri Shivaji Institute of Pharmacy, Parbhani
- Sinhgad College of Pharmacy, Narhe/Ambegaon/Lonavala/Kondhwa
- Smt Kishoritai Bhoyar College of Pharmacy
- Smt S S Patil College of Pharmacy
- Smt. Kashibai Navale College of Pharmacy, Saswad Road Kondhwa (Bk.)
- Smt. Kusumtai Wankhede Institute of Pharmacy
- Sri. Anand College of Pharmacy
- Sudhakarrao Naik Institute of Pharmacy
- Tapi Valley Education Society's College of Pharmacy
- University Deptt. Of Chemical Technology, Matunga Road
- V.J.S.M.'s Institute of Pharmacy, Junnar
- Veer Mata Hiraben P. Shah College of Pharmacy, Kasar-Vadavali, Ghodbunder Road
- Vidarbha Youth Welfare Society's Institute of Pharmacy
- Vidya Bharati College of Pharmacy
- Waghire College of Pharmacy, Saswad District
- Y B Chavan College of Pharmacy
- Yash Institute of Pharmacy
- Yashvantro Chavan College of Pharmacy, near Nagapur Bridge, near Manmad Road

== Odisha ==
- Balangi Pharmaceutical
- College of Pharmaceutical Sciences, Ganjam
- College of Pharmaceutical Sciences, Marina Drive Road P.O. Baliguali
- The College of Pharmaceutical Science, Via Janla
- Dadhichi College of Pharmacy
- Gayatri College of Pharmacy, Jamadarpali
- Indira Gandhi Institute of Pharmaceutical Sciences
- Indira Gandhi Memorial Institute of Pharmaceutical Sciences
- Institute of Pharmaceutical Sciences & Technology, P.O. Bahugram
- Institute of Pharmaceutical Technology
- Institute of Pharmacy & Technology
- Jeypore College of Pharmacy, Koraput
- Kanak Manjari Institute of Pharmaceutical Sciences
- Mayurbhanj Medical Academy, Baripada
- Om Sai College of academy, Ganjam
- Orissa College of Pharmaceutical Science
- Pharmaceutical College, Tingipali
- Pranabandhu Institute of Paramedical Science & Technology
- Roland Institute of Pharmaceutical Science, Behampur
- Ronald Institute of Pharmaceutical Sciences, (Ganjam)
- Royal College of Pharmacy & Health Sciences, Ganjam
- S.C.B. Medical College
- School of Pharmaceutical Sciences, Sikhya Anusandhan, Khurda
- Seemanta Institute of Pharmaceutical Sciences
- Siddheswar College of Pharmaceutical Sciences
- Sri Jayadev College of Pharmaceutical Sciences
- University Department of Pharmaceutical Sciences, Utkal University, Vani Vihar, BBSR (Govt.)
- V.S.S. Medical College
- Women's Polytechnic
- Govt. Medical College
- Govt Polytechnic for Women
- Govt Polytechnic Institute for Women

== Rajasthan ==
- Mahatma Gandhi College of pharmaceutical sciences Jaipur
- Akashdeep College of Pharmacy, Mansarovar
- Alwar Pharmacy College
- Baba Mungipa College of Pharmacy, Jhunjhunun
- Bharti Institute of Pharmaceutical Sciences, Hanumangarh Road
- Bhupal Nobels' College of Pharmacy
- Bhupal Nobles' College of Pharmacy
- Birla Institute of Technology and Sciences
- Deepshikha College of Pharmacy
- Department of Pharmacy, University of Technology
- Deptt. Of Pharmaceutical Science
- Deptt.of Pharmaceutical Science S.M.S. Medical College
- Goenka College of Pharmacy, Khuri Bari, Lachhmangarh Road
- Gyan Vihar School of Pharmacy, Mahal Jagatpura
- Jaipur College of Pharmacy, Sitapura, Tonk Road
- Lachoo Memorial College of Science & Technology (Pharmacy)
- Lal Bahadur Shastri College of Pharmacy, Tilak Nagar
- Maharaja Surajmal Institute of Pharmacy
- Maharishi Arvind College of Pharmacy, Ambabari
- Marwar Pharmacy College
- Nehru Memorial College of Pharmacy
- Permanand College of Technology
- Regional College of Pharmacy, Jaipur
- Sanjeevan College of Pharmacy
- Sanjivani College of Pharmaceutical Sciences
- Shri Bajrang College of Pharmacy, Deeg
- Shri U.S.B. College of Pharmacy, Santpur, Abu Road
- Sri Balaji College of Pharmacy
- Sri Ganganagar Institute of Pharmaceutical Sciences, near RIICO Bus Stand
- Swami Keshvanand Institute of Pharmacy, Jaipur

== Tamil Nadu ==
- A J College of Pharmacy
- Aadhi Bhagawan College of Pharmacy
- Adhiparasakthi College of Pharmacy, Chengai M.G.R. District
- Amrita Institute of Pharmaceutical Sciences, Elamakkara Post
- Annai Velakanni's Pharmacy College
- Antarcticaa College of Pharmacy, Palayamkottai
- Arulmigu Kalasalingam College of Pharmacy
- C L Baid Metha College of Pharmacy
- C.S. Jain College of Pharmacy, Srimushnam
- Cherraan's College of Pharmacy
- Coimbatore College of Pharmacy
- Coimbatore Medical College
- College of Allied Medical sciences, Shenoy Nagar
- College of Paramedical Sciences, Thindal Post
- College of Pharmacy
- College of Pharmacy Sri Gokulam Institute of Pharmedical Science, Premier Complex
- Department of Pharmacy, Porur
- Edayathangudy G.S. Pillay College of Pharmacy
- The Erode College of Pharmacy, Valipurathanpalayam (P.O.)
- Fathima College of Pharmacy, Nellai Kattabomman Dt.
- Institute of Pharmaceutical Technology
- J.K.K. Nattraja College of Pharmacy
- J K K Munirajah Medical Research Foundation
- J S S College of Pharmacy
- K M College of Pharmacy
- K. K. College of Pharmacy
- K.M.R. College of Pharmacy, Perundurai
- Kamalakshi Pandurangan College of Pharmacy
- KMCH College of Pharmacy
- KRS Pallavan College of Pharmacy, M.M. Avenue
- Laxmi Narayan College of Pharmacy
- Madras College of Pharmacy, Avadi
- Madras Medical College, Park Town
- Madurai Medical College
- Maharaja College of Pharmacy
- Mayor Radhakrishna Pillai Memorial College of Pharmacy
- Nadar Mahajana Sangam Jayaraj Annapackiam College of Paramedical Sciences
- Nandha College of Pharmacy
- National College of Pharmacy
- Padmavathi College of Pharmacy
- Pallavan Pharmacy College
- Pandyan College of Pharmacy, Virattipathu
- Pearl Peace Medical Mission College of Pharmacy, Nellai Kattabomman Dt.
- Periyar College of Pharmaceutical Sciences for Girls
- PGP College of Pharmaceutical Science & Research Institute
- PSG College of Pharmacy
- R V S College of Pharmaceutical Sciences
- Royal College of Pharmacy & Paramedical Science, Madukkarai
- S A Raja Pharmacy College
- S Chattanatha Karayalar College of Pharmacy
- S R M College of Pharmacy, Kanchipuram District
- S. B. College of Pharmacy
- Shoba College of Pharmacy, near Railway Station
- Sri Ramachandra College of Pharmacy, Sri Ramachandra Institute of Higher Education and Research (DU)
- Sri Ramakrishna Institute of Paramedical Science College, New Sidhapur
- Subbarayalu College of Pharmacy, Industrial Estate P.O.
- SSM College of Pharmacy
- Swamy Vivenkanandha College of Pharmacy.
- T.K. College of Pharmacy, Dharapuram Road.
- Texcity College of Pharmacy, Podanur Main road
- Thanjavur Medical College
- Thanthai Roever College of Pharmacy
- Trichy College of Pharmacy
- Ultra College of Pharmacy
- VEL's College of Pharmacy
- Venkateswara College of Pharmacy, Chennai main road, Anaikkarai, Thanjavur District
- Vinayaka Mission's College of Pharmacy

== Telangana ==
- Anwarul Uloom College of Pharmacy, New Mallepally, Hyderabad
- A.S.R. Govt. Junior College
- Balaji Institute of Pharmacy
- Balaji College of Pharmacy
- Bojjam Narasimhulu Pharmacy College for Women
- Care College of Pharmacy
- Deccan School of Pharmacy, Kanchanbagh
- G. Pulla Reddy College of Pharmacy
- Gokaraju Rangaraju College of Pharmacy
- Govt. Junior College, Warangal Dist
- Govt. Junior College for Boys
- Govt. Junior College for Girls, Malakpet
- Govt. Polytechnic for Women, Siddipet
- J.J. College of Pharmaceutical Sciences
- Jangaon Institute of Pharmaceutical Sciences
- KLR Pharmacy College
- Kamala Nehru Polytechnic for Women, Exhibition Grounds
- Krishnaveni Exhibition Society's
- L S Institute of Pharmaceutical Sciences
- Mak College of Pharmacy
- Madhira Institute of Technology & Science
- MLR Institute of Pharmacy
- Nalanda College of Pharmacy, Nalgonda
- NIPER Hyderabad
- Pragathi Pharmacy College
- Sarojini Naidu Vanitha Mahavidyalaya, Mukkaramjahi Road
- Shadan College of Pharmacy, Himayat Sagar Road
- Shadan Women's College of Pharmacy, Khairatabad
- Smt. Sarojini Ramulamma College of Pharmacy
- Sri Venkateswara College of Pharmacy, Serilingampally Mandal
- SRR College of Pharmaceutical Sciences
- St. Peter's Institute of Pharmaceutical Sciences
- Sultan-Ul-Uloom College of Pharmacy, Road No. 3, Banjara Hills
- Talla Padmavathi College of Pharmacy, near 100 ft Flyover Road
- University College of Pharmaceutical Sciences

== Uttar Pradesh ==
- Department of Pharmacy, Mohammad Ali Jauhar University, Rampur, U.P.
- A. N. D. College of Pharmacy
- PharmaState.academy, offers easy access to training & up-skilling programs created by experts from Pharma Industry.
- Advanced Institute of Biotech & Paramedical Sciences
- Amity Institute of Pharmacy, Amity University Uttar Pradesh, Lucknow Campus
- Maharana Peatap College of Pharmacy, Kanpur
- Amity Institute of Pharmacy, Noida
- Anand College of Pharmacy, NH-2 Keetham
- Azad Institute of Pharmacy & Research, via Bangla Bazaar Road
- Bhagwant Institute of Pharmacy, Bhagwantpuram, Muzaffarnagar
- BBS Institute of Pharmaceutical & Allied Sciences
- Department of Pharmaceutical Sciences
- Department of Pharmaceutical Engineering & Technology(Indian Institute of Technology- IIT(BHU), Varanasi)
- Department of Pharmacy, Bhojipura Post
- Dr. K.N. Modi Institute of Pharmaceutical Sciences & Research
- Faculty of Engineering & Technology (Department of Pharmacy)
- Faculty of Pharmacy, Uttar Pradesh University of Medical Sciences
- G.S.V.M. Medical College
- Govt. G' Polytechnic
- Govt. G' Polytechnic
- Govt. Polytechnic
- Govt. Polytechnic
- HIMT College of Pharmacy, Knowledge Park, 1 District, Gautam Budh Nagar
- Hind Institute of Medical Sciences, Barabanki Road
- HR Institute of Pharmacy, Meerut Road, Morta
- I.T.S. Paramedical (Pharmacy) College
- IIMT College of Pharmacy
- IEC college of Engineering & Technology (Department of Pharmacy), Greater Noida
- Innovative College of Pharmacy
- Institute of Pharmaceutical Sciences & Research
- Janta Polytechnic, Bhaipur
- K.G.'s Medical College
- Kamla Nehru Institute of Management and Technology, Faculty of Pharmacy
- KIET School of Pharmacy
- Krishnarpit Institute of Pharmacy, Allahabad
- L.L.R.M. Medical College
- Lucknow Model College of Pharmacy Ajeetan Khera Road Sadrauna Lucknow

7052180000

- M.L.N. Medical college
- Meerut Institute of Engineering & Technology, Bagpat Road-Bypass Crossing
- Nandini Nagar Mahavidyalaya College of Pharmacy
- NIPER Raibareli
- NKBR College of Pharmacy & Research Centre
- Om Sri Sai College of Pharmacy
- R. V. Northland Institute, Chithera Dadri
- R.K. College of Pharmacy
- Raj Kumar Goel Institute of Technology
- Rajarshi Rananjay Sinh College of Pharmacy, Amethi
- Rajiv Devi Ram Daya Mahila Polytechnic
- Rajiv Gandhi College of Pharmacy
- Rajiv Memorial Academy for Pharmacy, Mathura-Delhi Bypass Road
- Rakshpal Bahadur College of Pharmacy, Badaun Road
- S.D. College of Pharmacy
- S.N. Medical College
- Sanjay College of Pharmacy
- Saras College of Pharmacy
- Saroj Institute of Technology & Management, Lucknow-Sultanpur Road
- The Shivdan Singh Institute of Technology and Management, Aligarh-Mathura Road
- Shri Guru Ram Rai Institute of Technology & Science
- Shri Ram College of Pharmacy, Muzaffarnagar
- Sir Madan Lal Institute of Pharmacy
- Smt Vidyawati College of Pharmacy, Kanpur Road
- Spectrum Institute of Pharmaceutical Sciences & Research, near Kailash Hospital
- Translam Institute of Pharmaceutical Education & Research
- University Institute of Pharmacy, Kanpur
- Vishveshwarya Institute, G.T. Road, near Dadri
- SR Group of Institutions(College of Pharmacy), Ambabai, Jhansi
- SR College of Pharmaceutical Sciences, Ambabai, Jhansi
- Banaras Hindu University, Varanasi
- Shambhunath Institute of Pharmacy, Prayagraj.
- Sagar Institute of Technology & Management, Lucknow -Faizabad Road National Highway 27, Barabanki.
- Mangalayatan University, Aligarh

== Uttarakhand ==
- Gyani Inder Singh Institute of Professional Studies, Dehradun
- Siddhartha Institute of Pharmacy, Dehradun

== West Bengal ==
- Bengal College of Pharmaceutical Science and Research, Durgapur
- BCDA College of Pharmacy & Technology, Barasat
- Brainware University, Barasat
- Bengal School Of Technology, Chinsurah
- Burdwan Institute of Pharmacy, Purba Bardhaman
- Department of Pharmaceutical Technology, Jadavpur University
- Dr. B.C. Roy College of Pharmacy and Allied Health Sciences, Bidhan Nagar
- Gupta College of Technological Science
- Guru Nanak Institute of Pharmaceutical Sciences & Technology, Sodepur
- Institute of Pharmacy, Jalpaiguri
- Netaji Subhas Chandra Bose Institute of Pharmacy
- NSHM College of Pharmaceutical Technology
- Women's Polytechnic Govt. of West Bengal
- Haldia Institute of Pharmacy, Haldia
- Bharat Technology, West Bengal
