= Bidar Institute of Medical Sciences =

Medical school in Karnataka, India

Bidar Institute of Medical Sciences (BRIMS) ಬೀದರ್ ವೈದ್ಯಕೀಯ ವಿಜ್ಞಾನಗಳ ಸಂಸ್ಥೆ (ಬ್ರಿಮ್ಸ್)
- Type: Government
- Established: 2007 (19 years ago)
- Academic affiliations: Rajiv Gandhi University of Health Sciences
- Director: Dr. Shantala R. Koujalgi
- Location: Bidar, Karnataka, India; 17°55′14″N 77°30′56″E
- Campus: Urban, 27,806 m^{2} (299,300 sq ft)
- Website: bimsbidar.karnataka.gov.in/english

Bidar Institute of Medical Sciences, better and abbreviated as, BRIMS is a district Government Hospital and medical college in Bidar, Karnataka with a status of autonomous institute under Government of Karnataka. The college is recognised by National Medical Commission and is affiliated to Rajiv Gandhi University of Health Sciences.

Initially was tagged to district hospital of Bidar, which was of 300 beds strength and was later upgraded to new BRIMS teaching hospital of 750 beds. The new building has eight stories with various departmental OTs, central lab, upgraded equipments, which was inaugurated in 2017.

The Institution runs UG and PG courses in various specialities. Intake for MBBS was initially 100 annually and had been increased to 150 per annum since 2017. Admissions are through NEET UG.

PG seats are in the department of Anatomy, Physiology, Biochemistry, Pharmacology, Forensic medicine and Community medicine. Seats for clinical departments are expected to start from 2018 onwards in Medicine, Surgery, Ophthal, ENT and Pediatrics. Admissions are through NEET PG.

The institute is tagged with zonal pharmacovigilance centre and NODAL reference lab under NTCP (National Tuberculosis Control Programme).

== Campus ==
Campus is in a single premises spreading around 45 acres (18 ha), and consisting of

1. Main college and administrative office

2. Old hospital building

3. New hospital building

4. Staff quarters (1+1)

5. UG Boys hostel+mess

6. UG girls hostel + mess

7. PG boys hostel

8. PG girls hostel

9. 24*7 Blood bank

The campus is provided with uninterrupted electricity and water on most of the days of the year. UG hostels are attached with mess which provides both VEG and NON-VEG food. Mess is run by a student committee formed from representatives of each batch. Mess expenditures is shared by everyone.

The campus Is free of ragging and a task force of professors had been assigned as antiragging squad to control the same. hostels has TV room, recreational room, etc.

Nehru stadium is just adjacent to the campus. There is a swimming pool of district administration at a walkable distance of 300 metres (980 ft). Separate UG and PG hostel buildings of BRIMS with adequate parking place for two and four-wheelers.

== Departments ==
- Anatomy
- Physiology
- Biochemistry
- Microbiology
- Pharmacology
- Forensic Medicine
- Pathology
- Orthopedics
- OBG
- Paediatrics
- ENT
- Surgery
- Medicine
- Radiology
- Ophthalmology
- Dentistry
- Dermatology
- Com. Medicine
- Radiology
