= Ayesha Kidwai =

Indian theoretical linguist

- Education: Jawaharlal Nehru University
- Occupation: Linguist
- Awards: Infosys Prize

Ayesha Kidwai is an Indian theoretical linguist. She is a professor at the Jawaharlal Nehru University in New Delhi, and an awardee of the Infosys Prize for Humanities in 2013.

== Biography ==
She is the grand-daughter of Anis Kidwai. Kidwai obtained a master's and doctoral degree in linguistics from the Jawaharlal Nehru University.

In 2023 Ayesha Kidwai was elected Corresponding Fellow of the British Academy.

== Career ==
=== Academic ===
Kidwai's theoretical linguistics work has applied Noam Chomsky's notion of Universal grammar to South Asian languages. In particular, she studied the parameters that explain the syntactic properties of Meiteilon, Santali, Bengali and Malayalam. She proposed a novel theory on free word order, exemplified by scrambled noun-phrases in Hindi-Urdu.

Kidwai undertook several research projects in field linguistics. Between 1999 and 2001, she investigated the acquisition of the Hindi language among children, and she studied the Urdu's socio-cultural effects on other Indian languages.

In 2008, Kidwai showed that because Sanskrit-speaking ruling classes captured only the public domain, this prestige language was unable to completely cripple less prestigious languages (Indo-Aryan, Dravidian and Austro-Asiatic) that pervaded the subcontinent. Still, the smaller the language, the likelier it was to be dismissed as undeveloped, resulting in its speakers choosing not to take up education in it, fearing that they would be disadvantaged.

Her grandmother, Anis Kidwai's Urdu memoir Azadi ki chhaon mein (In Freedom's Shade), was translated by Kidwai into English in 2011. Anis's husband Shafi had been murdered in Mussoorie in 1947 following the Partition of India, which prompted Anis to become a social activist. Her memoir documents the efforts of the citizenry to stop the cycle of murders and retributions, the activities of the Shanti Dal, an organisation that helped to protect victims of the violence, and the attempts to recover abducted women. Kidwai continued the investigation of the fates of women abducted during the Partition, reporting in 2014 that nearly 80,000 women had been found in the massive recovery operations in the aftermath of the Partition.

=== Activism ===
In 1999, Kidwai set up a committee to help orient and sensitise against sexual harassment on the campus of Jawaharlal Nehru University. It was responsible for crisis management as well as mediation, investigation, and redress in response to complaints of sexual harassment. The template was adopted by other universities across India. In 2013, a survey she co-organised with Madhu Sahni revealed that more than half the women in JNU had suffered sexual harassment.

In 2016, Kidwai headed the Jawaharlal Nehru University Teachers' Association (JNUTA). When the student union president Kanhaiya Kumar was arrested on charges of sedition, she joined in the ensuing protests on behalf of the JNUTA.

== Selected works ==
=== Articles and presentations ===
- Ayesha Kidwai (27 August 2016). "The Question of Language in Education". Economic and Political Weekly. 51 (35).
- Ayesha Kidwai (8 July 2014). Re-Viewing Partition, Re-Claiming Lost Ground: A Critical Recovery of the Recovery Operation (Speech). New Delhi: Kiran Nadar Museum of Art.
- Emily Manetta; Ayesha Kidwai (2014). "Introduction To Formal Syntax, Semantics, And Morphology Of South Asian Languages". Linguistic Analysis. 40 (3&4). ISSN 0098-9053. Archived from the original on 5 January 2018.
- Prabir Purukayathra; Ayesha Kidwai (March 2013). "India's Freedom Struggle and Today's BDS Movement". In Rich Wiles (ed.). Generation Palestine: Voices from the Boycott, Divestment and Sanctions Movement. University of Chicago. ISBN 9780745332444.
- Ayesha Kidwai (January 2013). "Chomsky's Innateness Hypothesis: Implications for Language Learning and Teaching" (PDF). Language and Language Teaching. 2 (1): 57–61.
- Ayesha Kidwai (2010). "The cartography of phases: fact and inference in Meiteilon". In A.M. Di Sciullo; V. Hill (eds.). Edges, Heads, and Projections: interface properties. Amsterdam: John Benjamins.
- Ayesha Kidwai (2008). "Managing Multilingual India" (PDF). The Marxist. XXIV (2).
- Anvita Abbi; Imtiaz Hasnain; Ayesha Kidwai (2004). "Whose language is Urdu?". Heidelberg Papers in South Asian and Comparative Politics.
- Ayesha Kidwai (2004). "The Topic Interpretation in Universal Grammar". In V. Dayal; A. Mahajan A. (eds.). Clause Structure in South Asian Languages. Studies in Natural Language and Linguistic Theory. Vol. 61. Dordrecht: Springer. pp. 253–289. doi:10.1007/978-1-4020-2719-2_9. ISBN 978-1-4020-2717-8.
- Ayesha Kidwai (2002), Unaccusatives, Expletives and the EPP- feature of υ, Delhi University

=== Books ===
- Anis Kidwai (2021). Dust of the Caravan. Translated by Ayesha Kidwai. Zubaan. ISBN 9789385932892.
- Anis Kidwai (1 July 2004). In the Shadow of Freedom. Translated by Ayesha Kidwai. Zubaan. ISBN 978-81-89013-07-3.
- Anvita Abbi; R.S. Gupta; Ayesha Kidwai, eds. (2001). Linguistic Structure and Language Dynamic in South Asia : Papers from the Proceedings of SALA XVIII Roundtable. Motilal Banarsidas.
- Ayesha Kidwai (2000). Xp-Adjunction in Universal Grammar: Scrambling and Binding in Hindi-Urdu. Oxford University. ISBN 9780198030393.
- Ayesha Kidwai (1995). Binding and Free Word Order Phenomenon in Hindi-Urdu (PhD). Jawaharlal Nehru University.
