= Rajiv Gandhi University of Health Sciences =

State University in Karnataka

- Motto: Right for Rightful Health Science Education
- Type: Government
- Established: 28 June 1996; 30 years ago
- Affiliations: UGC, ACU
- Chancellor: Governor of Karnataka
- Vice-Chancellor: Dr. Bhagavan B. C.
- Location: Jayanagara, Bengaluru, Karnataka, India; 12°55′34.04″N 77°35′33.15″E
- Campus: Urban
- Website: www.rguhs.ac.in

Rajiv Gandhi University of Health Sciences (RGUHS) is a public university located in Bengaluru, Karnataka, India. It was chartered in 1996 by the Government of Karnataka, India, for the regulation and promotion of higher education in health sciences throughout the state of Karnataka. It is the largest medical university in India.

== History ==
Rajiv Gandhi University of Health Sciences (RGUHS) was established in 1996 by the Government of Karnataka with the primary aim of promoting and regulating higher education in health sciences across the state. Prior to its formation, health science education in Karnataka was overseen by multiple universities, leading to a fragmented system with varying standards. Recognizing the need for a centralized body to ensure uniformity, quality, and progress in health science education, the Karnataka government passed the RGUHS Act in 1994, which came into effect two years later, formally founding the university.

Named in honor of Rajiv Gandhi, the former Prime Minister of India, RGUHS was tasked with overseeing a wide range of health disciplines, including medicine, dentistry, nursing, pharmacy, and allied health sciences. This was a critical step in improving the quality of education and ensuring consistent academic and clinical training across affiliated institutions.

== Affiliated medical colleges ==
- Ballari Medical College and Research Centre
- Bengaluru Medical College and Research Institute
- Shri Atal Bihari Vajpayee Medical College and Research Institute, Bengaluru
- Bidar Institute of Medical Sciences
- Chamarajanagara Institute of Medical Sciences
- Coorg Institute of Dental Sciences
- Dharwad Institute of Mental Health and Neurosciences
- Dr. B. R. Ambedkar Medical College
- ESIC Medical College, Bengaluru
- ESIC Medical College, Kalaburagi
- Father Muller Medical College
- Gadag Institute of Medical Sciences
- Gulbarga Institute of Medical Sciences
- Hassan Institute of Medical Sciences
- Karnataka Medical College and Research Institute
- Kempegowda Institute of Medical Sciences
- Kidwai Memorial Institute of Oncology
- Kodagu Institute of Medical Sciences
- Mandya Institute of Medical Sciences
- M. S. Ramaiah Medical College
- Mysore Medical College & Research Institute
- SDS Tuberculosis Sanatorium
- Shimoga Institute of Medical Sciences
- Shridevi Institute of Medical Sciences and Research Hospital
- Sri Jayadeva Institute of Cardiovascular Sciences and Research
- St. John's Medical College
- The Oxford Medical College, Hospital & Research Centre
- Koshys Institute of Health Sciences
- KVG Medical College and Hospital

== Notable alumni ==
- Y. S. Rajasekhara Reddy, former Chief Minister of Andhra Pradesh
- M. K. Muneer, former Cabinet Minister in Government of Kerala
- C. N. Manjunath, Member of Parliament, Lok Sabha
- Y. Bharath Shetty, Member of Karnataka Legislative Assembly
- H. C. Mahadevappa, Cabinet Minister in Government of Karnataka
- Suraj Revanna, Member of Karnataka Legislative Council

== Controversy ==
In March 2023, Government of Karnataka led by the then Chief Minister, Basavaraj Bommai, wanted to rename the university after Kengal Hanumanthaiah, which was met with resistance and eventually the prospect was scrapped.
