= Siddiqa Kidwai =

Indian politician

Member of the Rajya Sabha
- In office 24 November 1956 – 02 April 1958
- Preceded by: Onkar Nath
- Succeeded by: Ahmed Ali Mirza

Personal details
- Born: 24 March 1914 Delhi
- Died: 18 August 1964 (age 50 years) Delhi
- Party: Indian National Congress
- Spouse: Shafiq Ur Rahman Kidwai
- Children: 3 sons and 1 daughter (including Sadiq-ur-Rahman Kidwai)

Begam Siddiqa Kidwai (25 March 1914 – 19 August 1964) was an Indian politician. She was a Member of the Rajya Sabha from Delhi since 25 November 1956 to 2 April 1964. She was elected in the by-election and again elected on 3 April 1958.

== Early life ==
She was born to Anwar Ur Rahman Kidwai and Wajih Un Nisa Kidwai on 25 March 1914 in Delhi, India.

== Personal life ==
She was married to Shafiq Ur Rahman Kidwai, then education minister of Delhi and they had 3 sons including Sadiq-ur-Rahman Kidwai and 1 daughter.
