= Anis Kidwai =

Indian activist and politician (1906–1982)

Anis Kidwai (1906–1982) was a writer, an activist and a politician from Uttar Pradesh. She worked towards peace and the rehabilitation of the victims of India's bloody partition, and spent a majority of her life in service of the newly independent India. She served two terms as a Member of the Parliament in the Rajya Sabha as a part of the Indian National Congress from 1956 to 1962.

== Personal life ==
Anis Kidwai was born in 1906 in Barabanki, United Provinces of Agra and Oudh into a patriotic and orthodox family of Awadh, known as the Kidwai family. Her father, Wilayat Ali was a prominent lawyer who wrote humorous columns in local papers. Anis was a self-taught student. She became well-versed in Urdu and English literature by listening to the tutors that taught her brothers. After her father's death, she was consigned to a life behind the purdah until the late 1930s, when India's final efforts at the freedom struggle allowed her a greater degree of participation in public life.

Anis married her cousin Shafi Ahmed Kidwai in 1920 and lived with him first in Allahabad and then in other cities, wherever her husband's job took them. Her husband's brother Rafi Ahmed Kidwai was a freedom fighter and was regularly imprisoned for his activism, and his family, including Shafi and Anis regularly faced political persecution for it.

In October 1947, her husband was murdered in a brutal communal attack, and this catapulted Anis into her role as an activist and a writer. She gave up wearing the burkha and came to Delhi to offer her support to Gandhi and his cause.It was after she came to Delhi that she was suggested by Gandhi to focus on helping others. In just a few months, working alongside Subhadra Joshi, Anis helped victims of the communal bloodbath that followed Independence; and with Mridula Sarabhai she helped in the recovery of abducted women.

In 1973, her daughter Azadi died after many years battling rheumatic heart disease.

Anis Kidwai died on 16 July 1982, leaving behind a daughter and two sons – Seema, Parvez and Kamal.

== Political career ==
Anis Kidwai's political career began in part due to the death of her brother-in-law Rafi on 24 October 1954. Shortly after his death, the Congress offered a Rajya Sabha seat 'to the family'. Although Rafi and Shafi's younger brother Mahfuz could have assumed the seat, he asked that Anis be the nominee. Anis Kidwai served as a Member of the Parliament from the Indian National Congress party from Bihar at the Rajya Sabha for two terms, from 1956 to 1962 and then from 1962 to 1968. She retired on 2 April 1968.

During her tenure, she participated actively in the proceedings alongside other women MPs like Savitry Devi Nigam, Dr Seeta Parmanand and Subhadra Joshi. She spoke in favour of the Punishment for Molestation of Women Bill 1958, which was introduced by Savitry Devi, which eventually lapsed and was not taken up again. Before her official political career began, Anis served as a secretary of the Women's Congress Committee from 1921 to 1923.

In 1961, she was the sole woman member of a six-member parliamentary committee constituted by Jawaharlal Nehru to look into possible reforms of Muslim Personal Law, which was disbanded almost immediately as its very first meeting drew vociferous protests by Muslim MPs and ministers.

== Literary work and awards ==
Anis wrote a memoir in Urdu, Azaadi Ke Chaaon Mein (In Freedom's Shade) which gives a detailed account of the struggles faced by the refugees post partition and the emotional dilemma's she faced as she worked for the resettlement of the abducted women. It was published in 1974 to great critical acclaim and won her an award from the Urdu Academy of Uttar Pradesh. In 1976 and 1980, two collections of essays were published, titled Nazre Khush Guzre and Ab Jinke Dekhne Ko. In her book Zulum, she condemns the inhumanity of communal violence. She also authored Char Rukh, a book on the lives and work of writers and poets. Anis Kidwai was honoured by the Sahitya Kala Parishad for her contribution to literature.

== Published accounts ==
=== Film ===
Mersiya 1947, is a short film documenting the oral histories of partition survivors and the stories of women across religions and borders experiencing the different phases of partition violence. The film was co-directed by Akanksha Damini Joshi and is titled Mersiya 1947. This film is based on the accounts of two social workers, Anis Kidwai and Kamala Ben Patel who had rescued abducted women for three years after partition. The opening credits of the Bollywood film Pinjar contains a dedication to Anis Kidwai.
