= Mandya Institute of Medical Sciences =

Indian medical college in Mandya, Karnataka

Mandya Institute of Medical Sciences (MIMS) ಮಂಡ್ಯ ವೈದ್ಯಕೀಯ ವಿಜ್ಞಾನಗಳ ಸಂಸ್ಥೆ (ಮಿಮ್ಸ್)
- Type: Government
- Established: 2005; 21 years ago
- Affiliations: Rajiv Gandhi University of Health Sciences
- Principal: Dr. Thammanna P. S.
- Director: Dr. Mahendra B. J.
- Undergraduates: 150
- Postgraduates: 59
- Location: Mandya, Karnataka
- Campus: 25.3 acres; District Hospital, Mandya

Mandya Institute of Medical Sciences, in short MIMS, is an autonomous government medical college of Government of Karnataka. Located on the National Highway 275 of Bengaluru - Mysuru at a distance of 90 kilometers from Bengaluru and 46 kilometers from Mysuru.

== Background ==
The institution started in 2005 and the first batch of students was admitted in 2006. The first batch of postgraduate students, including pre- and paraclinical subjects, was admitted in 2010–2011.

== Campus ==
The medical college and its ancillaries are located on a sprawling 25 acres of campus, located abutting the highway. The college has an attached 550-bed hospital. The campus also houses the residential quarters for the faculty and staff and separate male and female hostels for undergraduate and postgraduate students.

A COVID-19 lab has been established at MIMS on the wake of COVID-19 pandemic. MIMS was in news for delivering 107 healthy babies from corona affected pregnant women.

== Administration ==
The management of the institution vests with the governing council, which is chaired by the Karnataka Minister for Medical Education. The head of the institution is the director, who is assisted by the principal, medical superintendent, chief administrative officer, financial advisor and the heads of departments.

== Admission ==
MIMS is a 100% merit-oriented institution and the students are selected through the common entrance test at the state level (85% of the seats) and the national-level entrance test (15% of the seats).

== Courses offered ==
The offered courses are officially permitted by the National Medical Commission.

=== Undergraduate ===
- M.B.B.S.

The college offers the four-and-a-half-year M.B.B.S. course with a one-year internship in affiliated hospitals. Total sanctioned seats for this course is 150, out of this, 85% seats are for Karnataka students and 15% seats for All India Quota students.

=== Postgraduate ===
- Postgraduate degree courses (MD/MS)

50% seats for Karnataka state students and 50% for All India quota students.

1. Anatomy
2. Physiology
3. Biochemistry
4. Pathology
5. Microbiology
6. Pharmacology
7. Forensic Medicine
8. Community Medicine
9. Dermatology
10. Ophthalmology
11. ENT
12. General Medicine
13. Anaesthesia
14. Orthopedics
15. Paediatrics
16. General Surgery
17. OBG
18. Radiology
19. Psychiatry

=== Paramedical courses ===
Two-year course for PUC-passed students and three-year course for SSLC-passed students.

1. Diploma in Health Inspector (DHI)
2. Diploma in Medical Laboratory Technology (DMLT)
3. Diploma in Operation Theatre Technology (DOTT)
4. Diploma in Medical Record Technology (DMRT)
5. Diploma in Ophthalmic Technology (DOT)
6. Diploma in X-Ray Technology (DMXT)

Note: Each paramedical course carries 20 seats.

== See also ==
Medical Colleges in Karnataka
