= Ahmed Ali Mirza =

Indian politician (1907 – 1968)

Member of Rajya Sabha
- In office 17 September 1958 – 2 April 1964
- Preceded by: Begum Siddiqa Kidwai
- Constituency: Delhi

Personal details
- Born: 9 February 1907
- Died: 18 November 1968 (aged 61)
- Party: Independent
- Spouse(s): (i) Rafiq Jahan Begum & (ii) Rashid Jahan Begum
- Parent: Dr Mohammed Ali (Father)

Ahmed Ali Mirza (9 February 1907 – 18 November 1968) was an Indian politician who served as a member of Rajya Sabha (the Upper house of the Parliament of India) from 1958 to 1964. He was also the member of Delhi Corporation in 1958.
