= Ali Ashraf (academic) =

Indian academician

Vice-Chancellor of Jamia Millia Islamia
- In office 1983–1989
- Preceded by: Anwar Jamal Kidwai
- Succeeded by: Syed Zahoor Qasim

Personal details
- Born: 1930
- Died: 1996 (aged 65–66)

Ali Ashraf (1930–1996) was an Indian academician who served as the vice-chancellor of Jamia Millia Islamia from 1983 to 1989.

== Life and career ==
Ali Ashraf was born in 1930. He taught at the IIT Kanpur. He was seen as a political scientist. He was also a director of Gandhian Institute of Studies, in Varanasi.

Ashraf died in 1996.

== Publications ==
Ashraf's works include:

- Ethnic identify and national integration
- The Muslim elite
- Political sociology: a new grammar of politics
