= The Oxford College of Pharmacy =

Coordinates: 12.90010°N 77.6279°E

- Type: Private
- Established: 1992
- Affiliations: Rajiv Gandhi University of Health Sciences, PCI and Accredited by National Board of Accreditation. Recognized by the Government of Karnataka.
- Principal: Dr. Padma M Parakh
- Undergraduates: B.Pharm
- Postgraduates: M.Pharm Pharmacology, M.Pharm Pharmaceutics, M.Pharm Industrial Pharmacy, M.Pharm Pharmacognosy, Pharm D(Post Baccalaureate)
- Doctoral students: Pharmacognosy
- Other students: D.Pharm
- Location: Bangalore, Karnataka, India
- Campus: 6/9, 1st Cross, Begur Road, Hongasandra, Bangalore – 560 068 (adj. to The Oxford College of Engineering and The Oxford Dental) College)
- Website: http://www.theoxford.edu/pharmacy/index.htm

The Oxford College of Pharmacy is a private college run under The Oxford Educational Institutions, which is the academic arms of the Children's Education Society in Bangalore, Karnataka, India. The Oxford College of Pharmacy was established in 1992. Over a period of years, the college has produced Pharmacists who are serving the profession by working in fields of Pharmacy like marketing, R&D, production, and academics.

== Affiliation and accreditation ==
The college is recognized by the government of Karnataka and is affiliated to the Rajiv Gandhi University of Health Sciences, Karnataka. The college has been approved by AICTE, Pharmacy Council of India and accredited by the National Assessment and Accreditation Council.

== Courses offered ==
- D. Pharma (2 years after PUC / 10 + 2)
- B. Pharma (4 years after PUC / 10 + 2)
- M. Pharma (Pharmaceutics) (2 years after B.Pharm)
- M. Pharma (Pharmacognosy) (2 years after B.Pharm)
- M. Pharma (Pharmacology) (2 years after B.Pharm)
- M. Pharma (Industrial Pharmacy) (2 years after B.Pharm)
- Pharm. D (6 years after PUC / 10 + 2)
- Pharm. D.[Post Baccalaureate] (3 years after B.Pharm)
- Ph.D in Pharmacognosy (after M.Pharm)

== Facilities ==
=== Library and Information center ===
The Oxford college of Pharmacy library subscribes to daily news papers and journals on the relevant subjects. The library keeps the previous years question papers and all dissertations.

=== Labs ===
The labs have instruments like HPLC and HPTLC. The Pharmacology lab has polyrite apparatus, Langendorff Apparatus etc. There is a Pharmacognosy lab for the PhD scholars.

=== Locations ===
The Oxford College of Pharmacy is adjacent to The Oxford College of Engineering and The Oxford Dental College at 6/9, 1st Cross, Begur Road, Hongasandra, Bangalore – 560 068
