= Sri Jayadeva Institute of Cardiovascular Sciences and Research =

Healthcare institute in Karnataka

Sri Jayadeva Institute of Cardiovascular Sciences and Research (SJICR)
- Autonomous, Government of Karnataka

Geography
- Location: Bengaluru; Mysuru; Kalaburagi; Hubballi, Dharwad

Organisation
- Type: Cardiology and Cardiovascular research
- Affiliated university: Autonomous

Services
- Beds: 1150

History
- Founded: 1972; 54 years ago

Links
- Website: www.jayadevacardiology.com

Sri Jayadeva Institute of Cardiovascular Sciences and Research (SJICR) is a tertiary care autonomous healthcare institute run by the Government of Karnataka, in Bengaluru, with additional centers in Mysuru and Kalaburagi. At the Bengaluru campus, it presently has 1,150 in-patient beds for cardiology, cardiothoracic surgery and pediatric cardiology, spread over two eight story buildings and is considered one of the largest dedicated heart hospitals in Asia. This campus was opened in 2001 and was built at a cost of US $ 17 million.

== Campuses ==
=== Main campus ===
- Bannerghatta Road, Jayanagara 9th block, Bengaluru, Karnataka, 560041.

=== Other campuses ===
- KRS Road, Kumabarakoppal, Mysuru, Karnataka, 570016.
- Gulbarga Institute of Medical Sciences Campus, Sedam Road, Kuvempunagara, Kalaburagi, Karnataka, 585105.

== History ==
The Sri Jayadeva Institute of Cardiovascular Sciences and Research traces its origins to the philanthropic vision of Late Sri Ambali Channabasappa (1914–1979), a Bengaluru-based entrepreneur and founder of the Jayadeva Charitable Trust.

Born in 1914 to Nanjappa and Rudramma in a modest family, Ambali Channabasappa discontinued his formal education following the death of his father in 1936 in order to support his family. He later established a textile business under the name Jayadeva Textiles in 1941. Influenced by his family's spiritual traditions and sustained involvement in charitable activities, he regularly supported hospitals and educational and religious institutions.

In 1972, Ambali Channabasappa established the Jayadeva Charitable Trust and formally approached the Government of Karnataka to set up a specialised cardiac hospital in Bengaluru. The official Bye-Laws of the institute identify him as "the donor of Cardiology Institute" who "realised this need for such a centre in our state and started this Institute in 1972." A Government Order (No. HMA 25 MED 72, dated 27 September 1972) was subsequently issued for the creation of a "Separate Independent Institute of Cardiology."

With the support of the then Health Minister H. Siddaveerappa, the government accepted an initial donation of ₹3,00,003 on 18 August 1972 for the establishment of the hospital within the Victoria Hospital complex. Channabasappa subsequently made a further donation of ₹1,00,001 for the construction of the first floor of the institute building. The Karnataka High Court also acknowledged that "the Institute had came into existence with the help of an initial donation" made by Channabasappa.

The foundation stone was laid on 28 May 1973 by D. Devaraj Urs, then Chief Minister of Mysore.

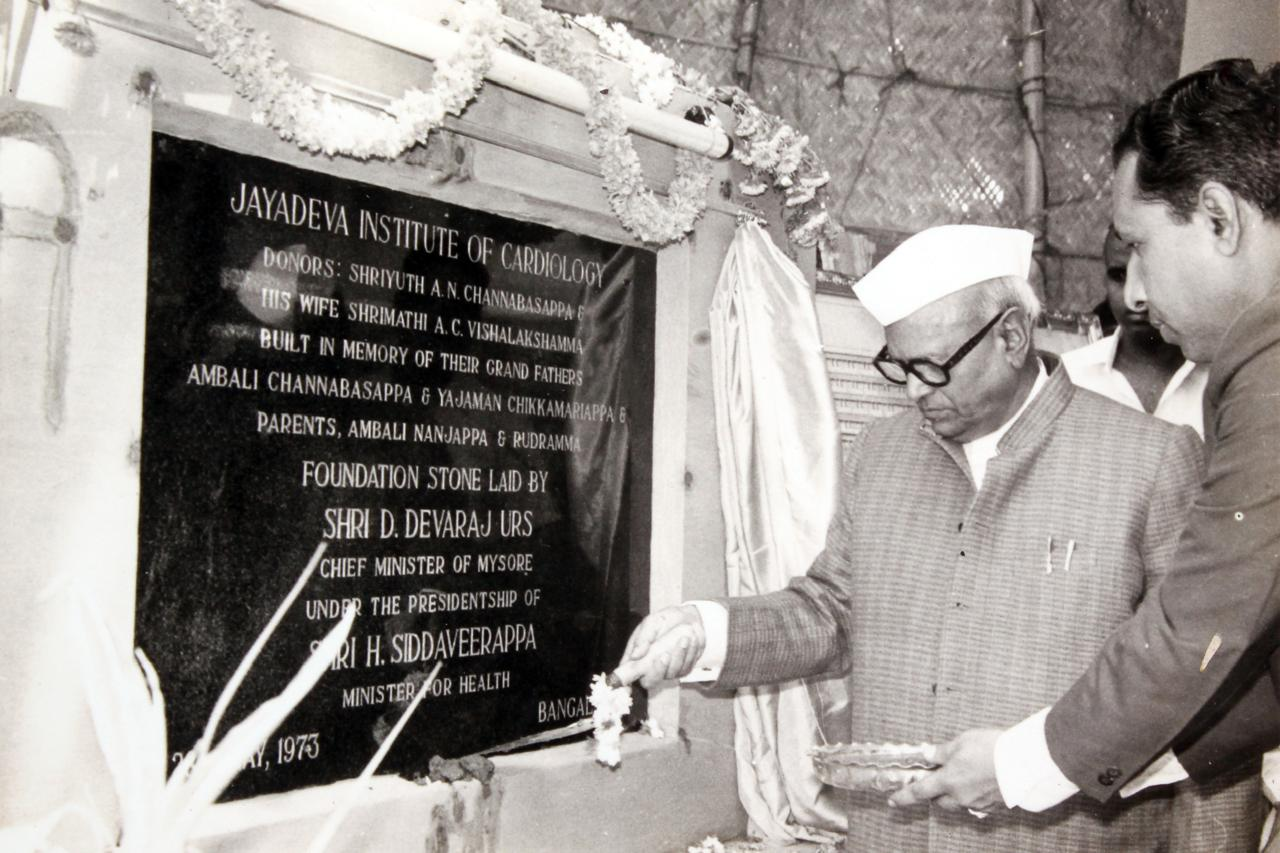
Foundation stone of the Jayadeva Institute of Cardiology, naming donors Shriyuth A.N. Channabasappa and Shrimathi A.C. Vishalakshamma. Stone laid by Chief Minister D. Devaraj Urs on 28 May 1973, under the presidentship of Health Minister H. Siddaveerappa.

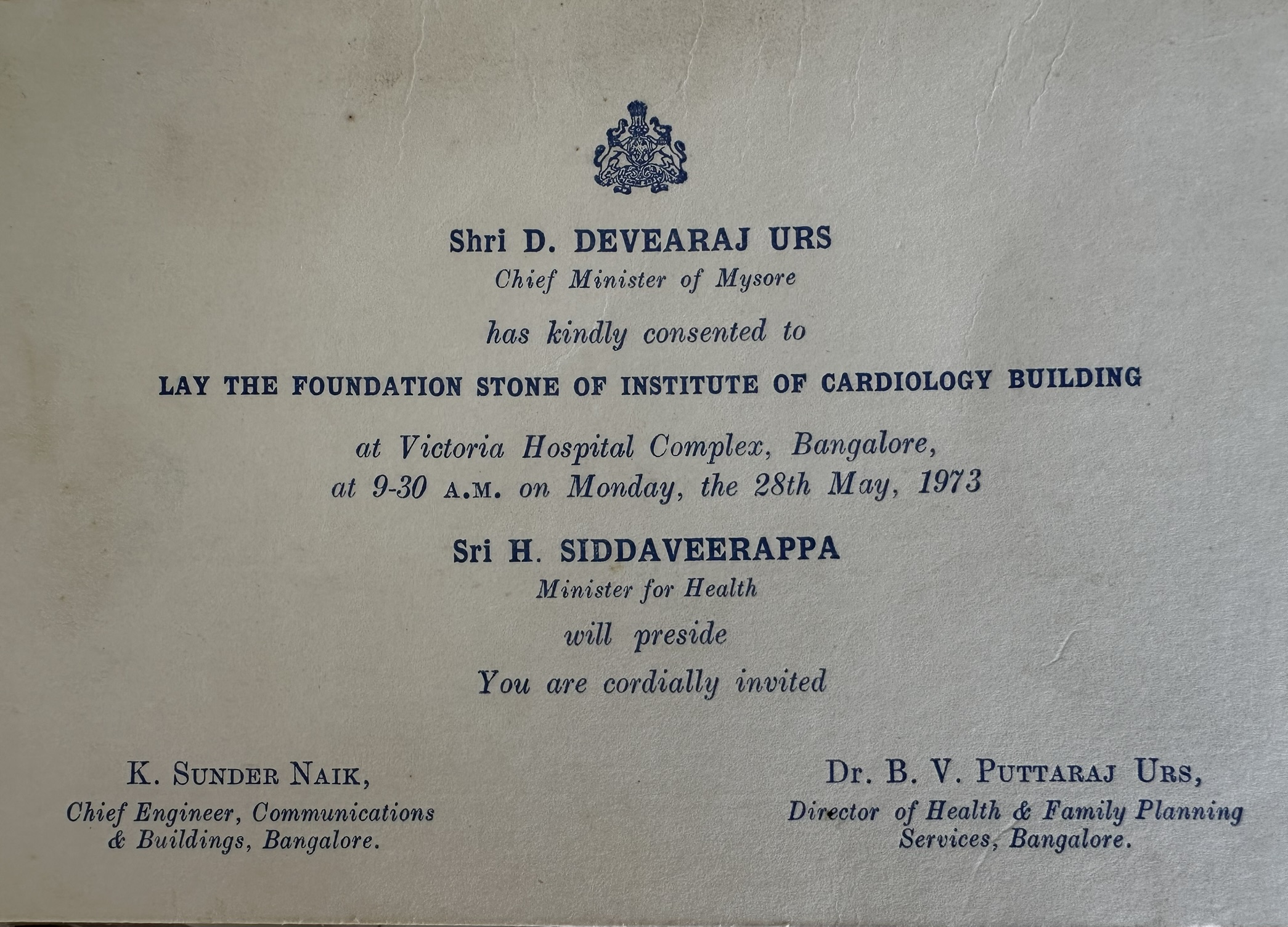
Official invitation card for the foundation stone laying ceremony of the Institute of Cardiology building at Victoria Hospital Complex, Bangalore (1973).

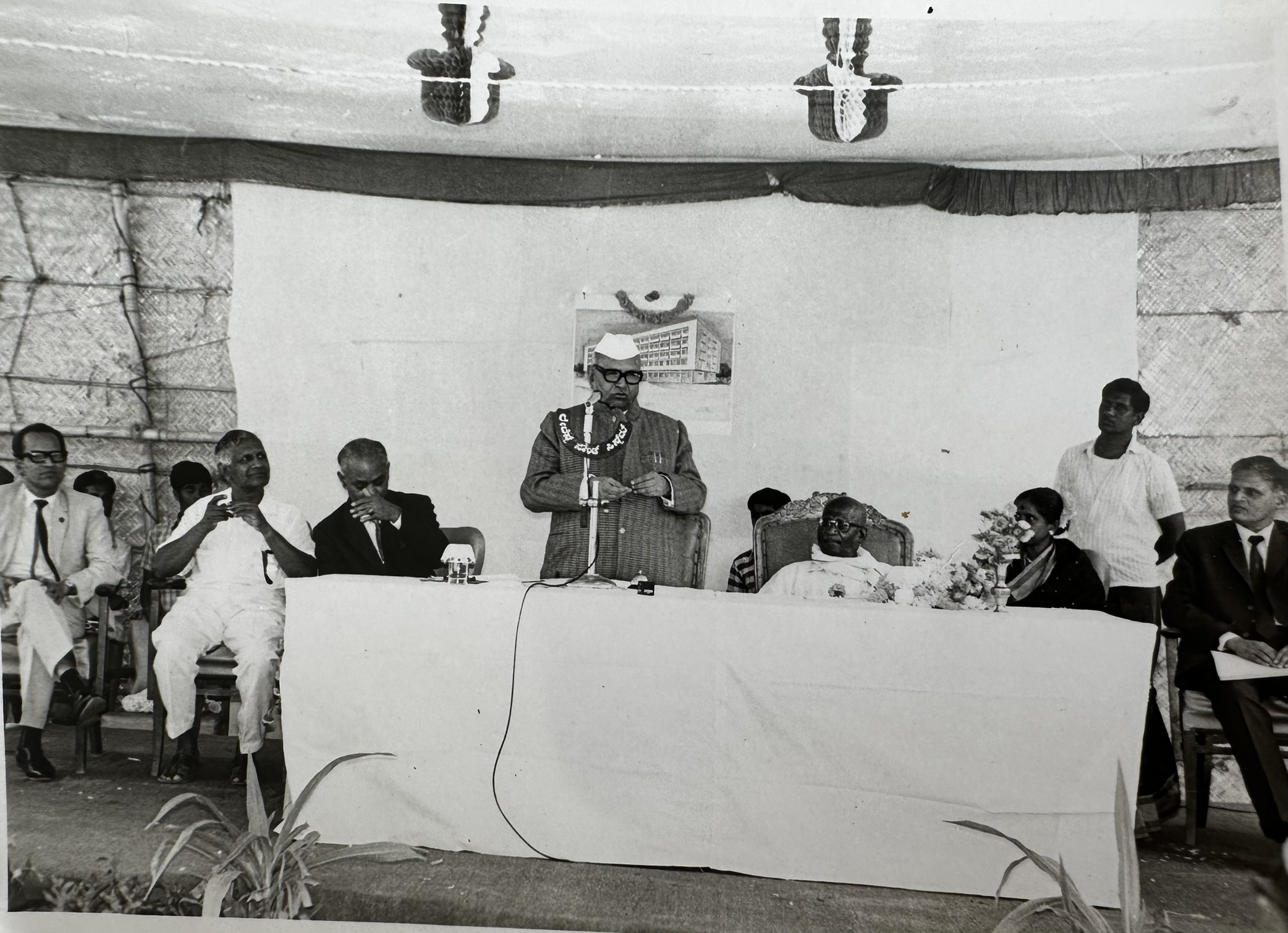
Foundation stone laying ceremony of the Institute of Cardiology at Victoria Hospital Complex, Bangalore on 28 May 1973, with Chief Minister D. Devaraj Urs presiding.

The Jayadeva Charitable Trust made further contributions during the construction and development phases of the hospital. After nearly seven years of development, the Jayadeva Institute of Cardiology was inaugurated on 26 March 1979. Ambali Channabasappa passed away later that year on 12 November 1979.

In recognition of its expanding role and specialised mandate, the institute was granted autonomous status on 9 April 1984 during the tenure of Chief Minister Ramakrishna Hegde and Health Minister P. G. R. Sindhia. Over the years, the institute expanded its facilities and services and was later relocated to its present campus on Bannerghatta Road, Bengaluru.

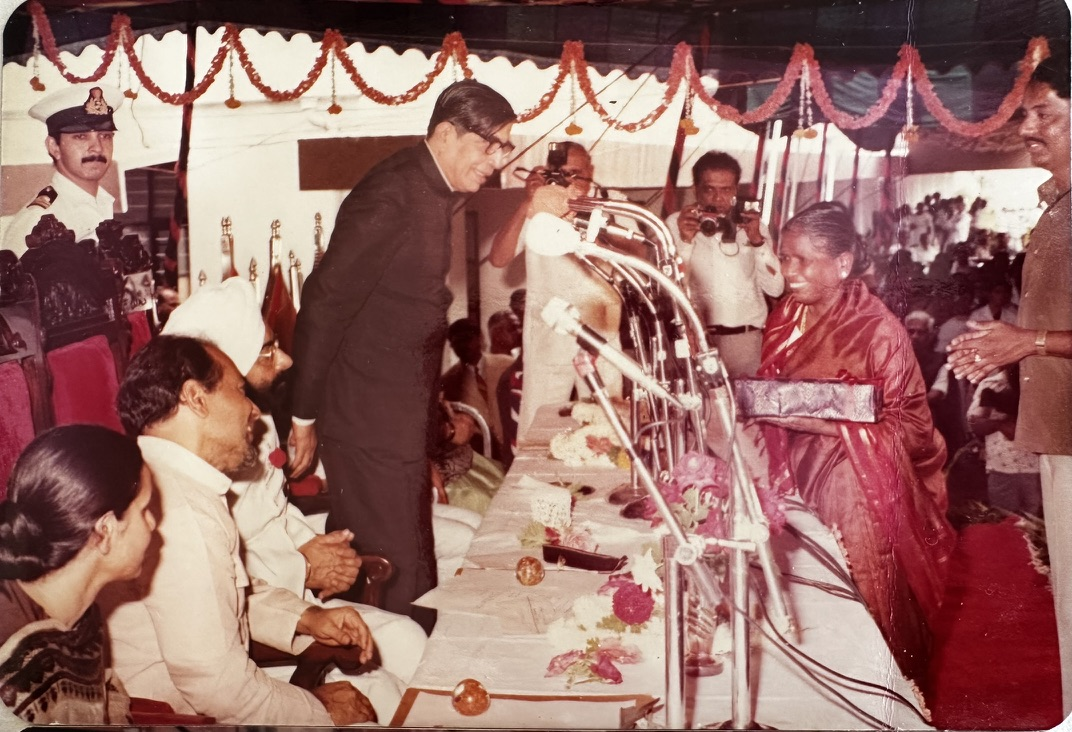
Public address during an inaugural ceremony related to the Institute of Cardiology at the Victoria Hospital Complex, Bangalore (1984).

The Jayadeva Charitable Trust continues to be associated with the institute through representation on its governing council, in accordance with the hospital bye-laws. The Trust is now handled by A. C. Shadakshari, who serves as a member of the Governing Council of the Sri Jayadeva Institute of Cardiovascular Sciences and Research. In 2022, a ward at the Mysuru branch was named in memory of Late Ambali Channabasappa and Vishalakshamma, sponsored by the Jayadeva Charitable Trust.

=== Campus layout ===
SJICR campus in Bengaluru consists of twin eight story towers, with a separate facility for library and Cath labs. The emergency rooms are located in the basement with access from Bannerghatta road

=== Out patient Departments ===
The hospital caters to approximately 165,000 patients a year and both cardiology, cardio-thoracic and pediatric cardiology OPDs run Monday to Saturday from 9 am to 4 pm. The average patient volume per day is around 1,000 - 1,200 OPD visits.

=== In Patient facilities ===
There are more than 1,150 in-patient beds, spread over 8 floors of the two buildings most of them being in general wards and intensive care units and only a few in two private wards. It is considered to be the best cardiology set up in India and Asia and the super specialty training program is considered to be one of the best in India, at par with AIIMS cardiology.

Expansion to other cities:

The Kalaburagi campus was opened to public on 24 April 2016 and the Mysuru campus was opened to public on 24 February 2018.

== Intensive Care Units ==
SJIC has 4 cardiac intensive care units, with 100 beds, and are well equipped with individual ventilators, touch panel monitors, infusion pumps, powered beds and all necessary ancillary medical equipment.

== Echo-cardiography lab ==
The echo lab at SJICSR is one of the busiest, with an average daily ECG turnover of 160 trans-thoracic echo-cardiograms and 10 trans-esophageal echo-cardiograms. The number of ECGs done each year is the highest in India and Asia.

== Interventional work ==
Average interventional cardiology workload ranges between 150 cases a day of which 700 - 800 cases per month are percutaneous coronary interventions; there are six Philips digital Cath labs, of which one is the only swing Cath lab in the region, enabling large case volumes and more efficient patient care. One cath lab is dedicated to electrophysiology and one for pediatric cardiology. SJICR interventional cardiology includes both adult and pediatric cardiology, and every form of interventional procedure, from primary angioplasty, to septal ablation (Sigwart procedure) is performed on a regular basis. It has the distinction of performing the highest number of percutaneous mitral valvulotomy procedures in the world for stenosis of the mitral valve. Pediatric cardiology in SJIC performs all standard pediatric interventional procedures, including percutaneous closure for Atrial septal defect, ventricular septal defect and also the relatively rare procedure of percutaneous closure of peri membranous ventricular septal defects. The angioplasty work carried out in the hospital is around 32,000 per year, the highest in India for a government set up. The institute boasts of the latest instruments and for most of the latest procedures in cardiology or Cath Lab, it is the pioneer in India.

== Post Graduate Programs ==
SJIC is the only government center in the state of Karnataka to run post doctoral courses in cardiology, cardio-thoracic surgery, pediatric cardiology and cardiac anesthesia. There are 21 seats for Doctorate in Medicine (DM) Cardiology and Master Chirurgiae (MCh) Cardio-thoracic surgery and 8 seats for Cardiac Anesthesia every year. These three-year courses are akin to the fellowship courses in cardiology and cardiothoracic surgery in other countries, and are entered to after a three year residency (MD/DNB) in either Medicine or Surgery, and are thus considered "Post Doctoral" courses or fellowships. These fellowships are much in demand partly since they are the only government sponsored courses in the state and also due to the high patient volume at SJIC which results in a higher degree of interventional experience after having completed the course, and, as such, are determined after an intensely contested all - India level examination conducted by the government of India. The patient load is one of the highest in India and so the choice of most of the post graduate doctorate trainees.

In 2008, the number of DM seats was increased to an unprecedented 21 per year and MCh seats to 12 per year, making it one of the largest Super-specialty training courses in India and Asia.

== Director ==
The present director is Padma Shri Professor C. N. Manjunath, an academic and interventional cardiologist. Manjunath is reported to have been the innovator of a new method of balloon mitral valvuloplasty. His research has been published in several articles and scientific papers in peer reviewed national and international journals; PubMed, an online repository of medical data has listed 73 of his articles. He is known to have performed over 26,000 interventional procedures and is credited with the highest number of balloon mitral valvuloplasty procedures using Accura balloon catheters in India. He is associated with Mallige Medical Centre, Bengaluru as a consultant and is a member of the Indian Medical Association. He has also served as the President of the Indian College of Cardiology. The Government of Karnataka awarded him the Rajyotsava Prashasti in 1998; he also received the fourth highest Indian civilian honor of Padma Shri in 2007. Rajiv Gandhi University of Health Sciences (RGUHS) honored him in 2012 with the degree of Doctor of Science (Honoris Causa).
