= Gulbarga Institute of Medical Sciences =

Medical College in Gulbarga, Karnataka

Coordinates: 17.328555°N 76.839859°E

Gulbarga Institute of Medical Sciences (GIMS) ಗುಲ್ಬರ್ಗ ವೈಧ್ಯಕೀಯ ವಿಜ್ಞಾನಗಳ ಸಂಸ್ಥೆ (ಜಿಮ್ಸ್)
- Type: Public
- Established: 2013
- Affiliations: Rajiv Gandhi University of Health Sciences
- Dean: Dr. Umesh S. R.
- Location: Kalaburagi, Karnataka, India
- Campus: District Hospital, Sedam Road, Kalaburagi - 585105
- Website: gimsgulbarga.karnataka.gov.in

Gulbarga Institute of Medical Sciences (GIMS) is a medical college located in Kalaburagi, Karnataka and run by the Government of Karnataka. The institution is affiliated to Rajiv Gandhi University of Health Sciences.

== Attached hospitals ==
The teaching hospital attached to the institution is the Government District Teaching Hospital, Kalaburagi. It is a government run 750-bed hospital with felicities a Regional Diagnostic Laboratory, Dialysis Unit, Blood Bank, Mortuary / PM, X-Ray, Burns Ward, ART Centre and Ayush Center.

== Admissions ==
=== Undergraduate courses ===
==== MBBS ====
The college offers the four-and-a-half-year MBBS course with a one-year compulsory rotating internship in affiliated hospitals.

== Departments ==
- Anatomy
- Physiology
- Biochemistry
- Pharmacology
- Pathology
- Microbiology
- Forensic medicine
- Community medicine
- General medicine
- Paediatric
- TB and chest
- Skin and V D
- Psychiatry
- General surgery
- Orthopedics
- Ent
- Ophthalmology
- OBG
- Anesthesia
- Radiology
- Dentistry

== Access ==
Kalaburagi is well connected by air, railway lines and roads. It is an important rail head on the Central Southern Railway zone line connecting to Bangalore, Mumbai, Delhi and Hyderabad.

It is well connected by National Highways with Bangalore and Hyderabad, which are 610 kilometres (380 mi) and 225 kilometres (140 mi) away respectively, from Kalaburagi. Road distances to other cities within the state are: Basavakalyan-80 kilometres (50 mi), Bidar -120 kilometres (75 mi), Raichur - 155 kilometres (96 mi) and Bijapur - 160 kilometres (99 mi).

Kalaburagi Airport is the nearest airport.
