= Qidwai =

Community of Muslims in India and Pakistan

Qidwai/ Kidwai
- Religions: Islam
- Languages: Urdu and Hindi and Arabic and Persian
- Populated states: Uttar Pradesh India and Sindh Pakistan; Middle East region

The Qidwai or Kidwai (Urdu: قدوائی, Arabic: قدوائی) are a community of Muslim Sheikhs in South Asia, who migrated from present day Israel and Palestine. They belong to the Israelites tribe of the regions. Their lineage which traces back to Isaac, is different to the rest of the Muslims whose lineage comes from the other son of Abraham, Ishmael. because, that their lineage is from actual wife of Abraham (Sarah) and not through (Hagar), Kidwais were always monotheist, unlike rest of the Arabs. They are mostly now settled in the state of Uttar Pradesh in India and Karachi, Sindh, Pakistan. They are also settled in areas of the Middle East specifically, Saudi Arabia, Palestine and Qatar.

The Qidwai, together with the Khan, Milki, Malik and Chaudhary form a community of substantial landowners.

== History and origin ==
The Qidwai claim descent from Qazi Qidwat-ud-din, a son of the Sultan of Rum. Their lineage before converting to Islam follows from Levi tribe. They were originally jews and belonged to one of the Twelve Tribes of Israel, known as Tribe of Levi. Qazi Qidwa fell out with his brother who was the then ruling Sultan, and migrated to India with his wife and son. There he became a close associate of the famous Sufi saint, Mu'in al-Din Chishti (1143-1236). The Sufi saint is said to have sent Qazi Qidwa to the Awadh region to spread Islam, where he is said to have won over fifty villages to Islam over some time. These fifty villages were later awarded to him by King of Delhi Shahab-ud-din Ghori Muhammad Of Ghor., and the region became known as Qidwara., later they moved in Barabanki and settled permanently.

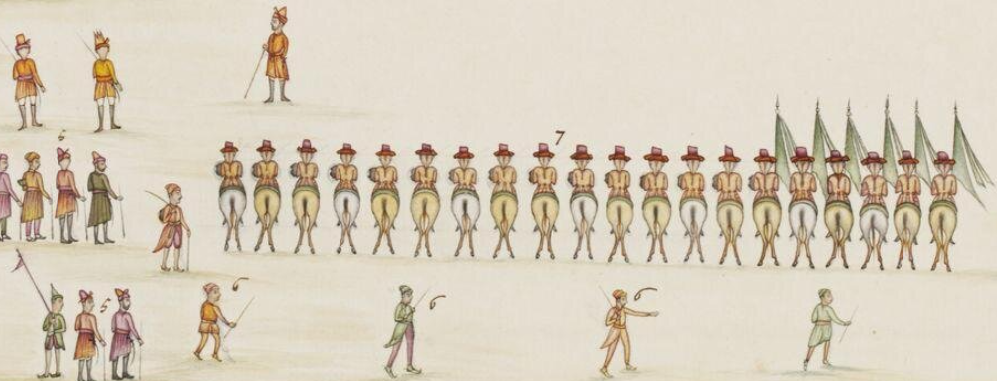
Camp of Shuja-ud-Daula of Awadh

The Qidwai's Fought Third Battle of Panipat., under the Nawab of Awadh Shuja-ud-Daula, the Qidwai were recruited in the household cavalry of Shuja-ud-Daula, which was mainly composed of the Sheikhzadi.

These clans had not taken any profession other than a soldier or a civil officer.

== Present circumstances ==
The abolishment of the zamindar system by the newly independent India in 1947 had a major impact on the Qidwai community. The larger estates were broken, and land given to the farmers who worked on their lands. This led to some emigration of the Qidwais to Pakistan.

The Qidwais are still found mainly in the districts of Lucknow.

== Rafi Ahmed Kidwai Award ==
The Rafi Ahmed Kidwai Award was created in 1956 by the Indian Council of Agricultural Research (ICAR) to recognize Indian researchers in the agricultural field. Awards are distributed every second year, and take the form of medals, citations, and cash prizes.

== Notable people ==
- Rafi Ahmed Kidwai (18 February 1894 - 24 October 1954), Veteran Indian politician, Indian independence activist and the Minister of Communications in the first Cabinet of Independent India (First Nehru Ministry).
- Abdul Majid Daryabadi(16 March 1892 – 6 January 1977), influential Islamic scholar, philosopher, writer, critic, researcher, journalist, and Quranic exegete active in the Indian subcontinent during the 20th century.
- Shafey Kidwai born 8 April 1960) an Indian academic, bilingual critic, translator, columnist, and author who is the recipient of prestigious Sahitya Akademi Award , Iqbal Sammaan and Urdu Academy awards.
- Syed Amir-uddin Kedwaii
- Fuad Shahid Hussain Qidwai (1924-1969), Indian World War II pilot, later Pakistan Air Force pilot

== See also ==
- Sayyid
- Siddiqui
- Kidwai Memorial Institute of Oncology
- Shaikhs in South Asia
