= Saleem Kidwai (Muslim Council of Wales) =

Saleem Kidwai OBE is Secretary General of the Muslim Council of Wales, An accountant by profession, in 2014 Kidwai was awarded an Honorary Fellowship by Cardiff Metropolitan University. He was appointed an Officer of the British Empire in the 2006 Birthday Honours for "services to Diversity and Business in Wales".

In 2015 Kidwai made the national headlines when, after being invited to speak about Islam at a village in Ceredigion, West Wales, concerned locals called the police because he was a Muslim.
