= Syed Zahoor Qasim =

Indian marine biologist (1925–2015)

Sayed Zahoor Qasim
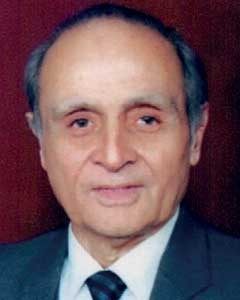
- Born: 31 December 1926; Rakswara, United Provinces, British India
- Died: 20 October 2015 (aged 88); Delhi, India
- Education: Majidiya Islamiya Intermediate College Allahabad; Aligarh Muslim University; University College of North Wales
- Scientific career
- Fields: Marine biology

Sayed Zahoor Qasim (31 December 1926 – 20 October 2015) was an Indian marine biologist. Qasim helped lead India's exploration to Antarctica and guided the other seven expeditions from 1981 to 1988. He was a Member of the Planning Commission of India from 1991 to 1996. He was the Vice Chancellor of Jamia Milia Islamia from 1989 to 1991 and an Honorary Professor of universities including Aligarh Muslim University, Madurai Kamaraj University, Anna Malai University, Indian Institute of Technology Madras, and Jamia Millia Islamia. He was awarded the highest civilian awards Padma Shri and Padma Bhushan by the Government of India.

== Early life ==
Qasim was born in Rakswara Gram Allahabad presently Kaushambi in 1926. His ancestor were rulers of Kaushambi. He began his schooling from Majidiya Islamiya Intermediate College Allahabad, and then moved to Aligarh Muslim University, where he obtained a B.Sc. degree in 1949 and a M.Sc. degree in zoology in 1951. He stood first in the order of Merit for which he was awarded the University Gold Medal. For several years, he was a lecturer in the Department of Geography at Aligarh Muslim University before proceeding to the United Kingdom for higher studies in 1953. In 1956 he completed his D.Sc. and Ph.D. degrees from University College of North Wales. He was the Director of Central Marine Fisheries Research Institute, Kochi, Kerala from 1971 to 1974. On 20 October 2015, he died at the age of 88.

== Awards and honours ==
- Padma Shri (1974)
- Rafi Ahmed Kidwai Award (1978)
- Lal Bahadur Shastri national Award (1988)
- Padma Bhushan (1982)
- Oceanology International Lifetime Achievement Award, UK (1999)
- First National Ocean Science and Technology Award by Government of India (2003–04)
- Asian Society Gold Medal (2005)
- SOFTI Biennial Award (2007)
- Lifetime Achievement Award, Indian Science Congress (2008)
