= Kidwai Memorial Institute of Oncology =

Coordinates: 12.9375°N 77.5981°E

Kidwai Memorial Institute of Oncology ಕಿದ್ವಾಯಿ ಸ್ಮಾರಕ ಗಂಥಿ ಸಂಸ್ಥೆ

Geography
- Location: Bengaluru, Karnataka, India

Organisation
- Affiliated university: Rajiv Gandhi University of Health Sciences for Academics

History
- Founded: 26 June 1973; 53 years ago

Links
- Website: kmio.karnataka.gov.in

Kidwai Memorial Institute of Oncology (Kannada: ಕಿದ್ವಾಯಿ ಸ್ಮಾರಕ ಗಂಥಿ ಸಂಸ್ಥೆ ) is a cancer care hospital in Bangalore, Karnataka. It is an autonomous institution of the Government of Karnataka and a Regional Cancer Centre funded by the Government of India. It was granted Regional Cancer Center status on 1 November 1980. The Indian Council of Medical Research has recognized this referral Institution as a research organization.

== History ==
Kidwai Memorial Institute of Oncology is named after Rafi Ahmed Kidwai, Who was a politician, an Indian independence activist, a socialist, and the Governor of Bombay. Rafi Ahmed Kidwai played a major role in donating 20 acres of the campus land and Rs. 100,000 for the radiotherapy machine. It was founded on 26 June 1973. The Government of Karnataka, by an order on 27 December 1979, converted the institute into an autonomous institution. The institute was registered on 8 January 1980 as an independent body. The first director of the institute, Dr. M. Krishna Bhargava, took charge on 23 January 1980.

== Treatment and training ==
It is a member of the Union for International Cancer Control and is recognized by the World Health Organization.

== Academics ==
College of Oncology

The academic cell has been in existence since 1987. The main objective and functioning of the academic cell is to facilitate the academic activities of the institute in the specialty of oncology. The institute imparts training in various discipline sub-specialties of oncology to Post-graduate students, Undergraduate students, interns (both national and international), nurses and scientists of allied sciences from various medical and paramedical institutions in the state and country. These courses are affiliated to Rajiv Gandhi University of Health Sciences and have recognition by the respective bodies such as the National Medical Commission, National Board of Examinations and the Indian Nursing Council.

== Charitable institute ==
KMIO is recognized as a charitable institute by the Endowment Department of Karnataka, considering its commitment for services to poor cancer patients. The charges levied for cancer investigations and treatment are well within the reach of poor patients. In cases where the total treatment cost is too high, patients are financially assisted by various schemes like free drugs from the institute, Karnataka Chief Minister's Medical Relief Fund, Poor Patients Welfare Fund, Children Welfare Fund, and Kidwai Cancer Drug Foundation. The anti-cancer drugs sold at Kidwai Cancer Drug Foundation are 40% to 60% cheaper than market rates.

== Kalaburagi branch ==
Kalaburagi branch has the facilities, including a LINIAC machine, a full-fledged CT simulator, chemotherapy unit and operation theater.
