= Wilayat Ali =

Indian satirist

Wilayat Ali (1885–1918; pen name Bambooque; Urdu: ولایت علی, romanized: vilāyat 'alī) was an Indian satirist who wrote in both Urdu and English. He was born in Masauli, Uttar Pradesh and studied at the Muhammadan Anglo-Oriental College. He was a staunch critic of British rule of the Indian subcontinent, often writing in The Comrade and New Era.
