= Kidwaipuri =

Kidwaipuri P&T Colony
- Neighbourhood
- Location in Patna, India
- Coordinates: 25°36′42″N 85°7′50″E
- Country: India
- State: Bihar
- Metro: Patna

Languages
  - Spoken: Hindi, English
- Time zone: UTC+5:30 (IST)
- PIN: 800001
- Planning agency: Patna Regional Development Authority
- Civic agency: Patna Municipal Corporation

Kidwaipuri, also known as P&T Colony, is a neighbourhood of Patna. It is centrally located residential colony of Patna, adjacent to Nageshwar Colony. Sri Krishna Nagar, Buddha colony and Patna Women's College mark other boundaries of Kidwaipuri. This area is under the jurisdiction of Kotwali police station of Patna Police.

== Transport ==
It is 2.5 km away from Patna Junction railway station and about 3.5 km away from Patna Airport.

== Landmarks ==
Kidwaipuri is well planned small colony with the apartments and commercial centers located near Nageshwar colony due its proximity to Boring Road and Boring Canal Road.

- Planetarium (100 m)
- Patna High Court (250 m)
- Boring Road Crossing (1 Km)
- Patna Junction (2.5 km)
- Sanjay Gandhi Biological Park Zoo (2.5 Km)
- Income Tax Office (100 m)
- Patna Museum Campus (0.3 km)
- Adalatganj (0.4 km)
- Patna Women's College (0.5 km)
- Nageshwar colony (0.8 km)
- Mount Carmel High School, Patna (0.8 km)
- New Patna Club (0.9 km)
- Patna G.P.O Campus (1 km)
- Mithapur Railway Over Bridge (1.1 km)
- Hardinge Park (1.1 km)
- R Block (1.3 km)
- Rajendra Path (1.7 km)
- R.L.S. Yadav College of Pharmacy
- Patliputra junction (9.0 km)
- Danapur Station (11.7 km)
