= Sadiq-ur-Rahman Kidwai =

Indian writer and academician

- Born: India
- Occupations: Academician, writer
- Spouse(s): Azra Kidwai - Academician, author, social worker
- Children: Jamal Kidwai, Saif Kidwai
- Parent(s): Father: Shafiq Ur Rahman Kidwai, Freedom Fighter, Social Reformer, MLC. Mother: Siddiqa Kidwai, Social Worker
- Awards: Padma Shri
- Website: Official web site

Sadiq-ur-Rahman Kidwai is an Indian writer, academician and a former dean of the School of Languages, Jawaharlal Nehru University, known for his scholarship in Urdu literature. He is the secretary of the Ghalib Institute, renowned educational and cultural institution in Delhi and a member of the Goethe Society of India. He was honored by the Government of India, in 2010, with the fourth highest Indian civilian award of Padma Shri.

== See also ==
- Mirza Ghalib
- Faiz Ahmed Faiz
