= Rafi Ahmed Kidwai =

Indian politician (1894-1954)

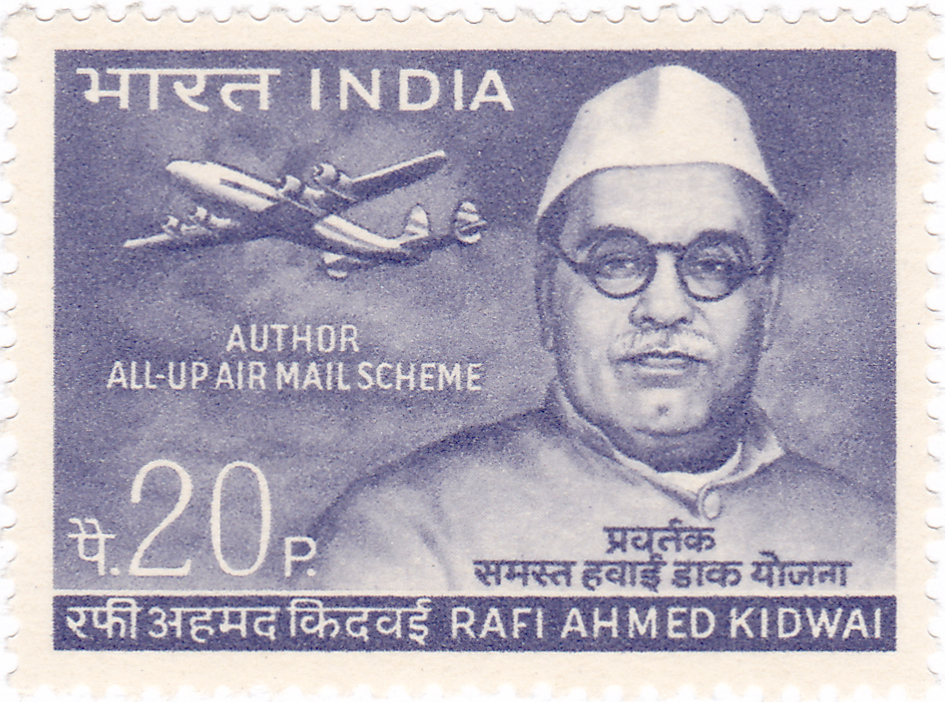
- Kidwai on a 1969 stamp of India

Union Minister of Food and Agriculture
- In office 13 May 1952 – 24 October 1954
- Prime Minister: Jawaharlal Nehru
- Preceded by: Kanaiyalal Maneklal Munshi
- Succeeded by: Panjabrao Deshmukh

Union Minister of Communications
- In office 15 August 1947 – 15 April 1952
- Prime Minister: Jawaharlal Nehru
- Preceded by: Office established
- Succeeded by: Amrit Kaur

Member of Parliament, Lok Sabha
- In office 13 May 1952 – 24 October 1954
- Preceded by: Office established
- Succeeded by: Jogendra Singh
- Constituency: Bahraich

Personal details
- Born: 18 February 1894 Barabanki, North-Western Provinces, British India
- Died: 24 October 1954 (aged 60) Delhi, India
- Party: Indian National Congress
- Education: Muhammadan Anglo-Oriental College, now called Aligarh Muslim University
- Khilafat Movement (1919-1922)

Rafi Ahmed Kidwai (18 February 1894 – 24 October 1954) was a politician, an Indian independence activist and a socialist. Kidwai served as Minister of Agriculture in the interim government of India and as first Minister of Communications in the first cabinet of independent India. He was also the first Member of Parliament for Bahraich and before that a member of the Constituent Assembly.

He hailed from Barabanki District of Uttar Pradesh, in north India.

== Biography ==
Rafi Ahmed Kidwai was born on 18 February 1894 in a middle class family in the village of Masauli, in Barabanki district (now in Uttar Pradesh). As a young man, after graduating from the Muhammadan Anglo-Oriental College at Aligarh, he became politically active and was a regular member of Khilafat Movement in 1920. He also vigorously supported the Non-cooperation movement (1919-1922) in the Barabanki district. In 1946, he became the Home Minister of Uttar Pradesh.

After the 1951-52 general elections in India, Jawaharlal Nehru made Rafi the minister of food and agriculture. At that time, there was food rationing all over India due to man-made food scarcity. Rafi worked very hard as a minister to solve that problem. He is said to have boldness and an imaginative approach in solving problems. Rafi also was a man of action and provided vigorous support to Nehru in the Indian National Congress national government.

== Death ==
Rafi Ahmed Kidwai died in Delhi on 24 October 1954. He had heart failure after experiencing an attack of asthma while delivering a speech. His burial site, at his home village, was later covered by a Mughal-style mausoleum. According to historian Paul Brass, "A formidable fund-raiser for Congress movements and elections, he distributed his largesse to all and sundry, but died in debt, leaving behind only a decaying house in his home village."

== Legacy ==
The Rafi Ahmed Kidwai Award was created in 1956 by the Indian Council of Agricultural Research (ICAR) to recognize Indian researchers in the agricultural field. Awards are distributed every second year, and take the form of medals, citations, and cash prizes. In his famous autobiography, Jawaharlal Nehru mentioned that Rafi Ahmad Kidwai was part of District Congress Committee and had signed a book containing recommendations to solve agrarian problem in United Provinces of British India in 1931.

According to Parliament of India or Rajya Sabha website, Rafi Ahmed Kidwai profile says:

"An eminent patriot, valiant freedom fighter and brilliant administrator, Rafi Ahmed Kidwai was a man of drive, quick decisions and firm action".

== Commemorative postage stamp ==
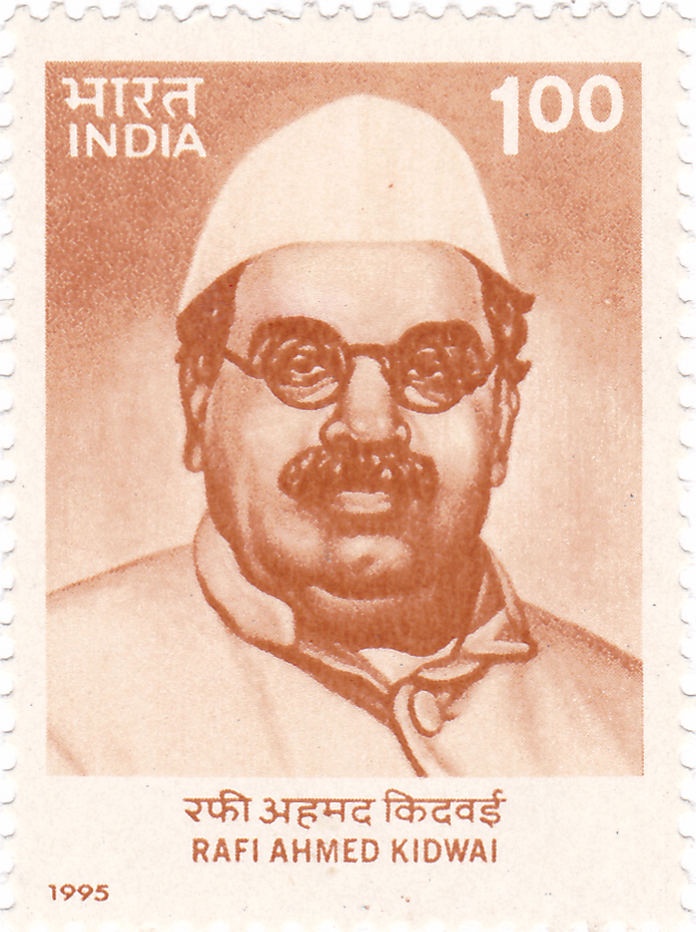

India Post issued a commemorative postage stamp On 1 April 1969 to acknowledge his services to India.

In November 2011, the Postal Staff College in Ghaziabad was named as the Rafi Ahmed Kidwai National Postal Academy.

There is also a street named after him in Kolkata.

There is a road named after him in Wadala Mumbai.

The Parliament of India has a portrait of Kidwai in a Committee Room.

Rafi Ahmed Kidwai also played a major role in donating 20 acres of the campus land and Rs. 100,000 for the radiotherapy machine for the establishment of cancer care hospital in Bangalore Karnataka state, India which is named after him - Kidwai Memorial Institute of Oncology.
