= K. R. Market =

Wholesale market in Bangalore, India

Coordinates: 12°57′49″N 77°34′39″E

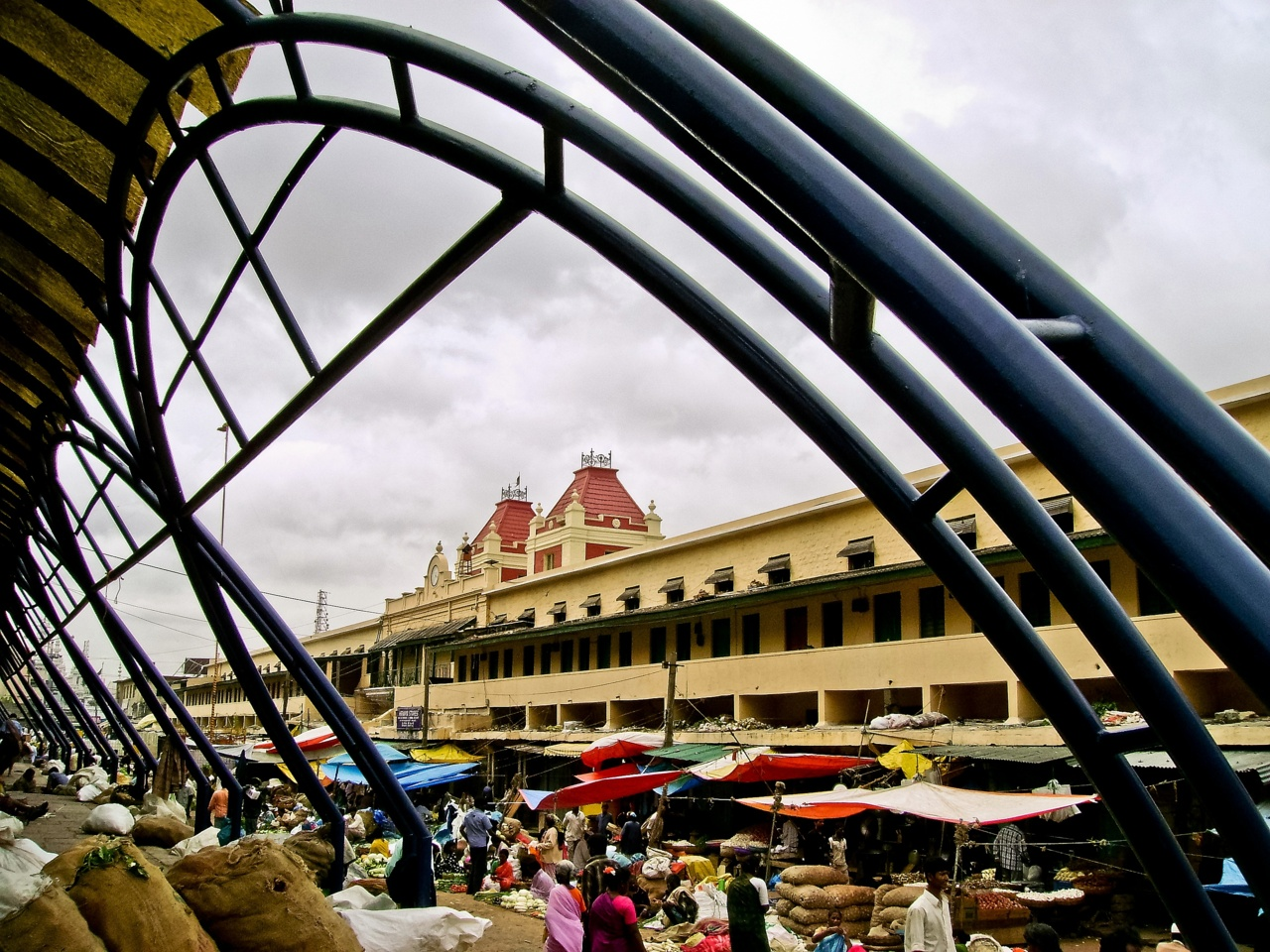
KR Market in 2011

K R Market (Krishnarajendra Market), also known as City Market, is the largest wholesale market dealing with commodities in Bangalore, India. It is named after Krishnarajendra Wodeyar, a former ruler of the princely state of Mysore. The market is located in the Kalasipalya area, adjacent to the Tipu Sultan's Summer Palace, on Mysore Road at itrajendra Road. It is the first locality in the whole of Asia to get and considered to be one of the biggest flower markets in Asia.

== History ==
K R Market was established in 1928. The location of the market is said to have been a water tank and then a battlefield in the 18th century during the Anglo-Mysore Wars. From the British era, two buildings remain, at the front and back of the market area.

== Present day ==
A new concrete 3-story structure was erected in the 1990s between the two older buildings to provide more space for vendors and better overall conditions. At the basement is an underground parking above which stand three commodity-specialised floors: flowers and vegetables on the lower ground floor, dry goods on the upper ground floor and tools and machine-tools accessories on the first floor.

== Gallery ==
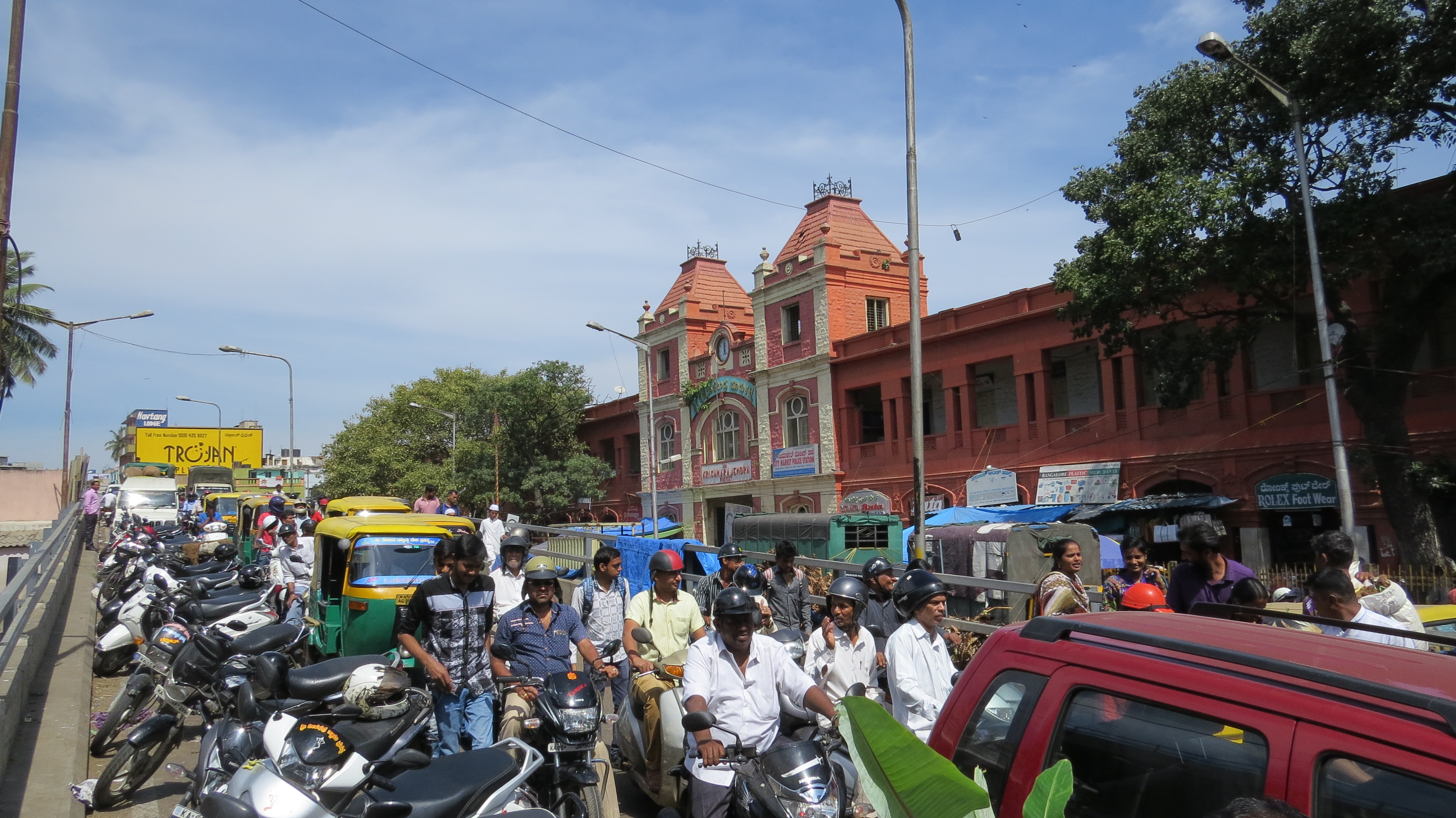
Entrance of the British-era front building

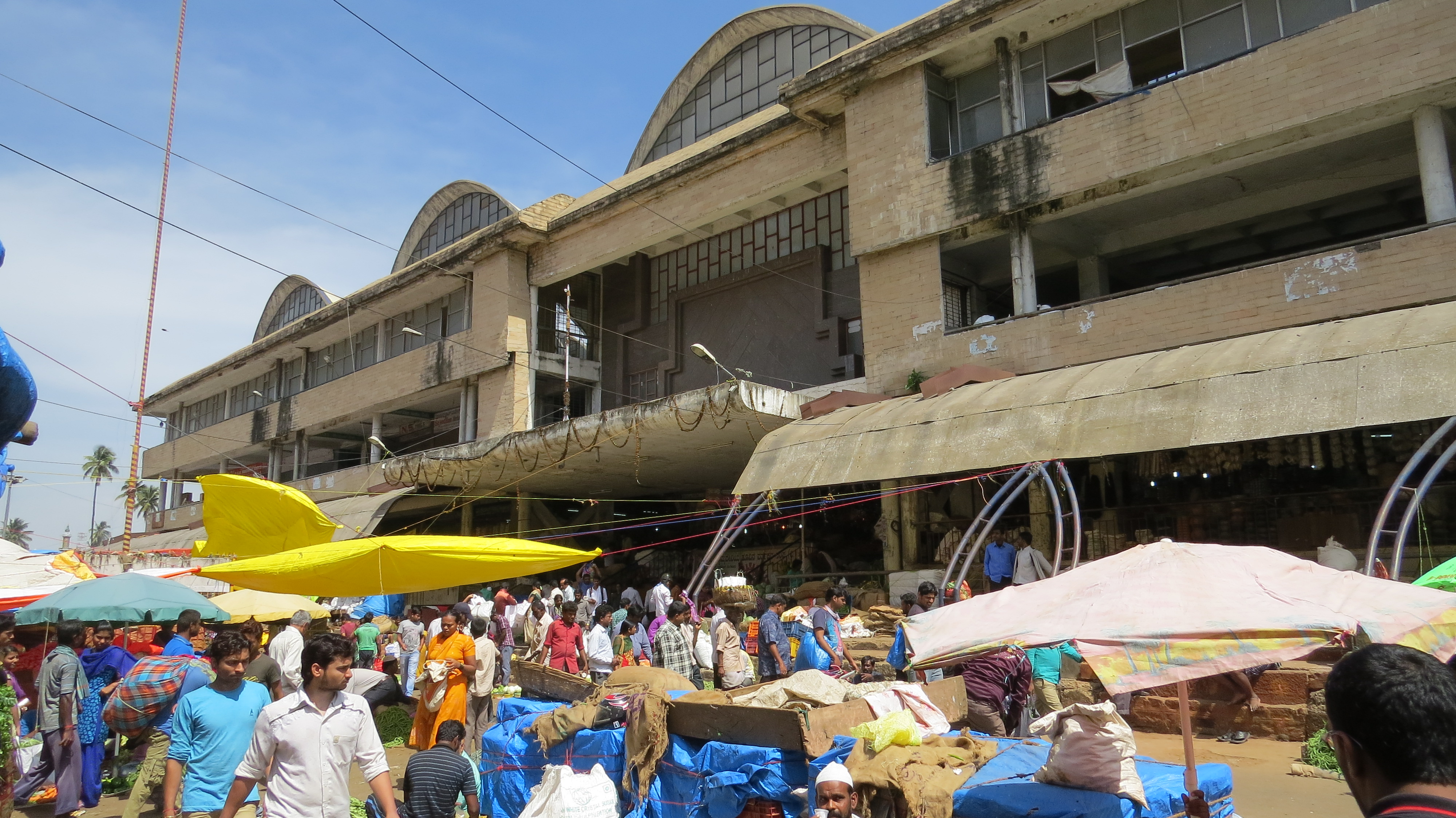
Front of modern (1990s) building

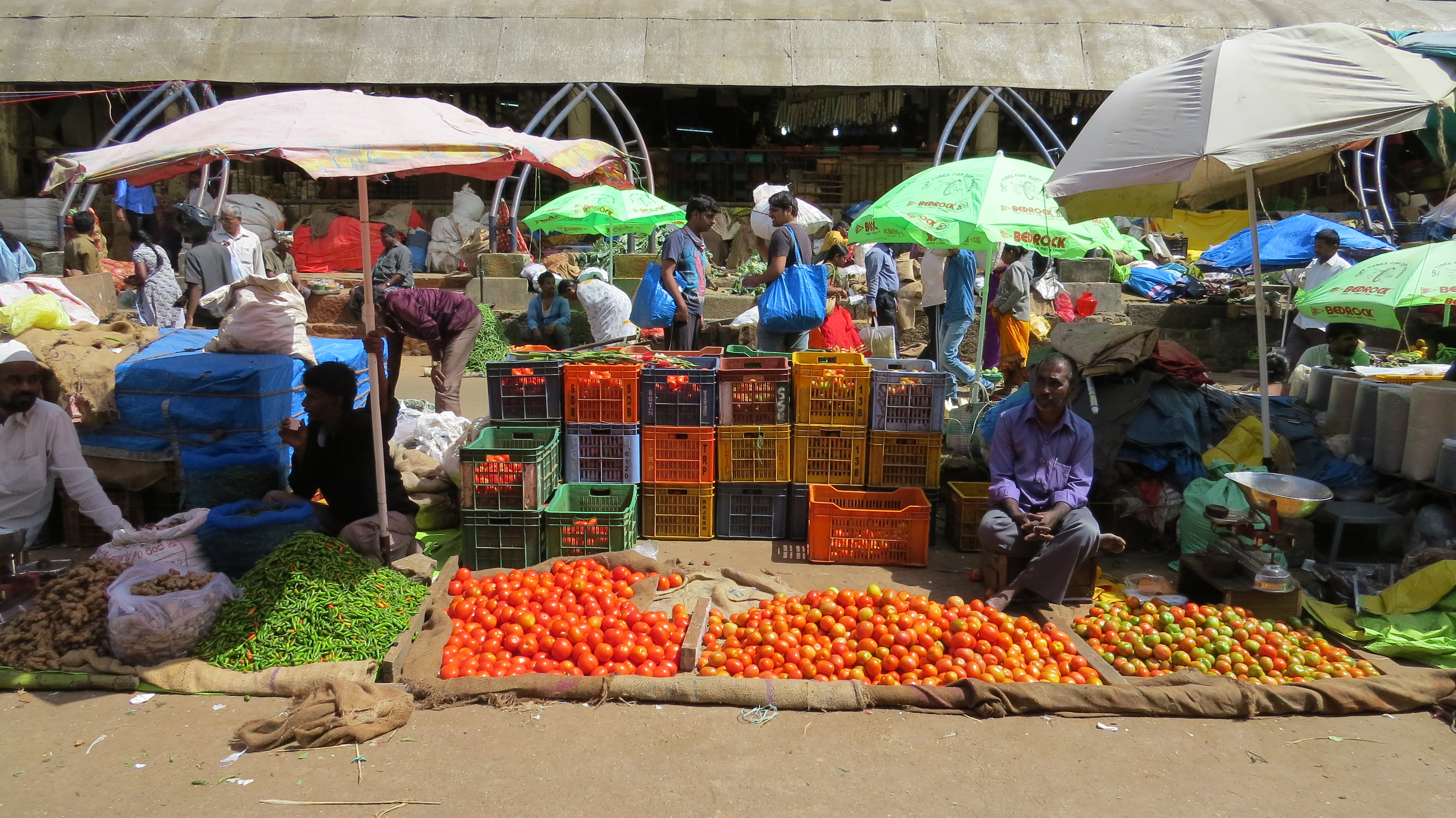
Tomato seller in the open-air section

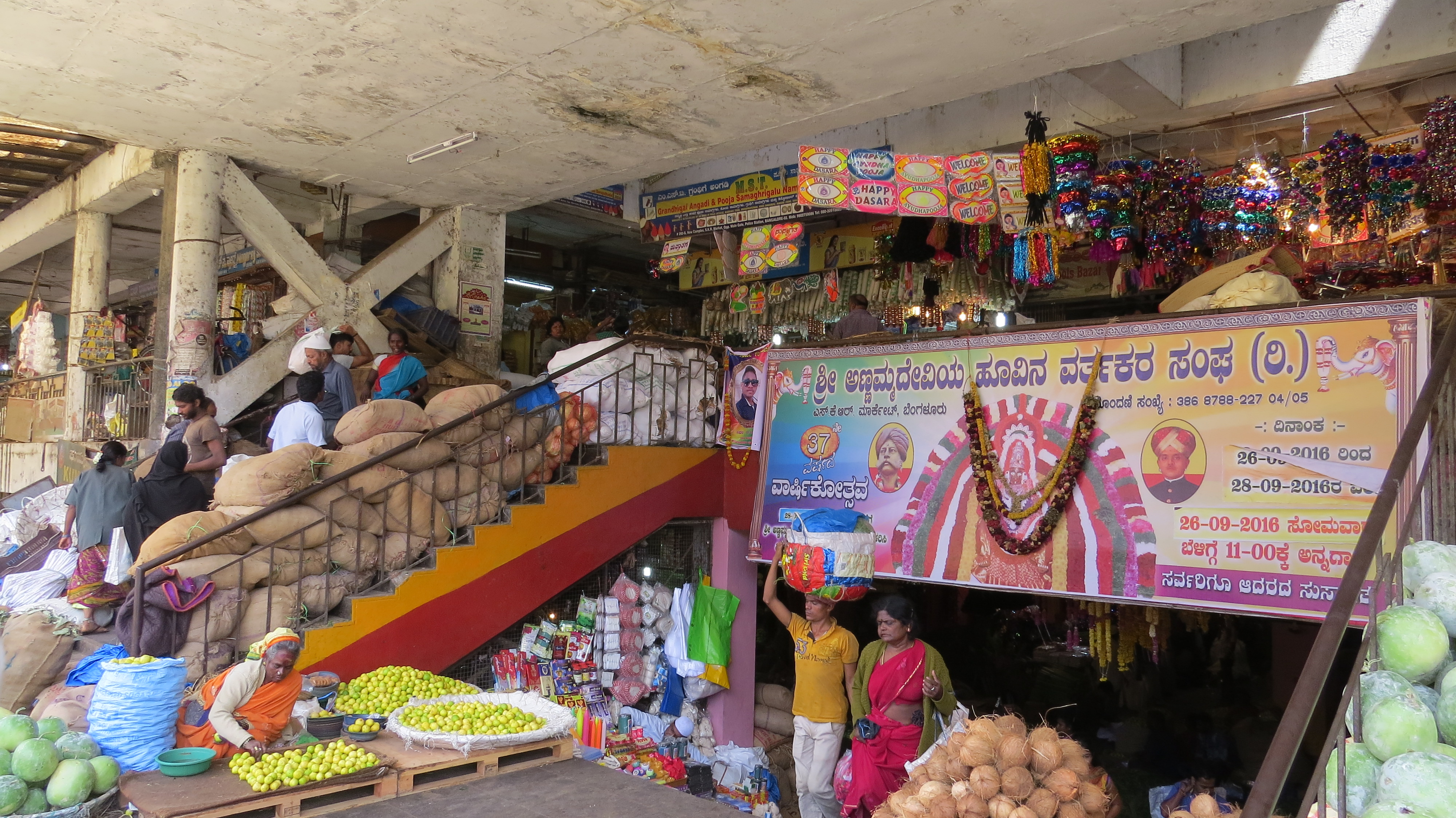
Entrance of the modern building

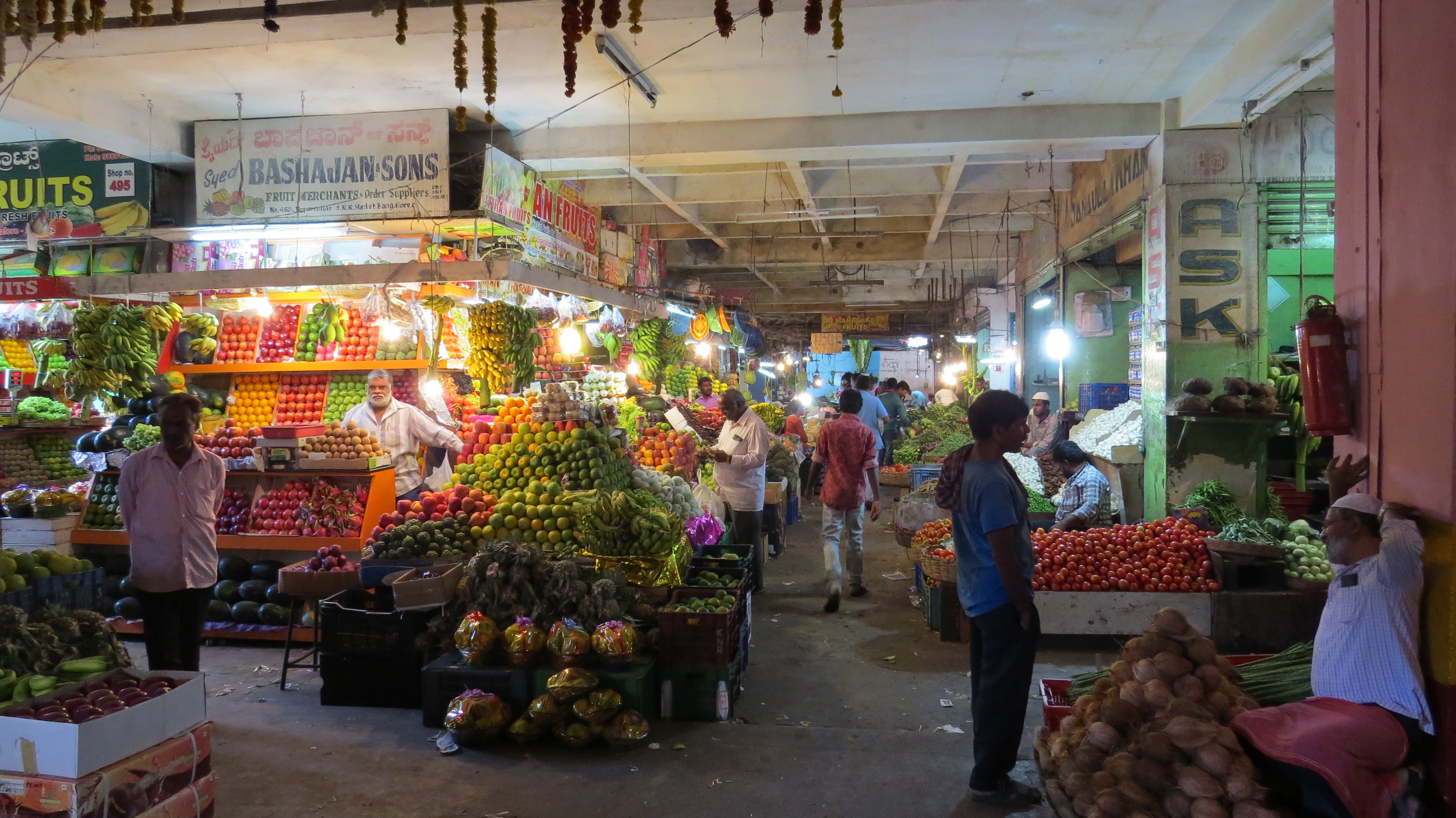
Basement level: Fruit and vegetable stalls

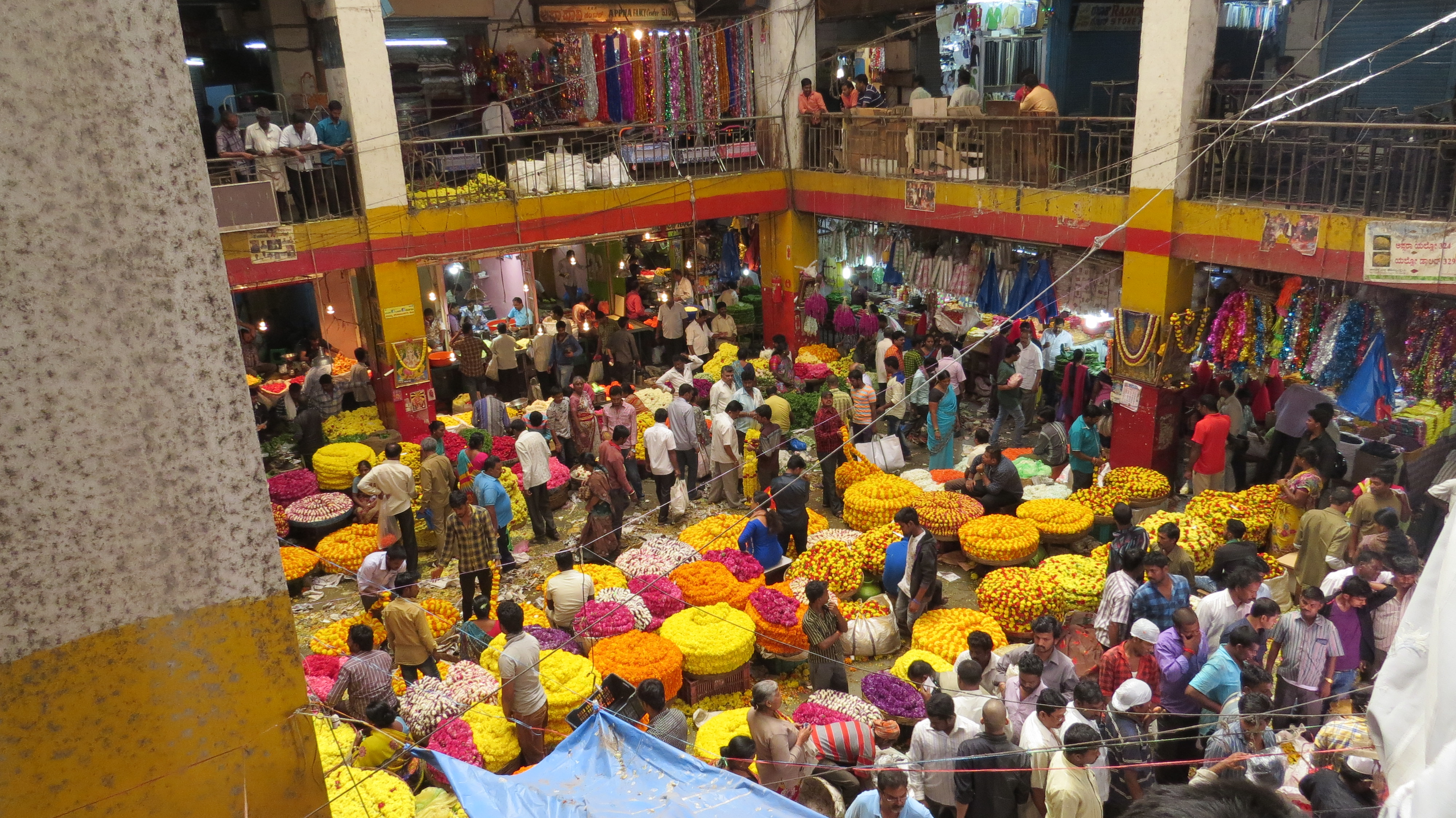
Basement level: flower sellers

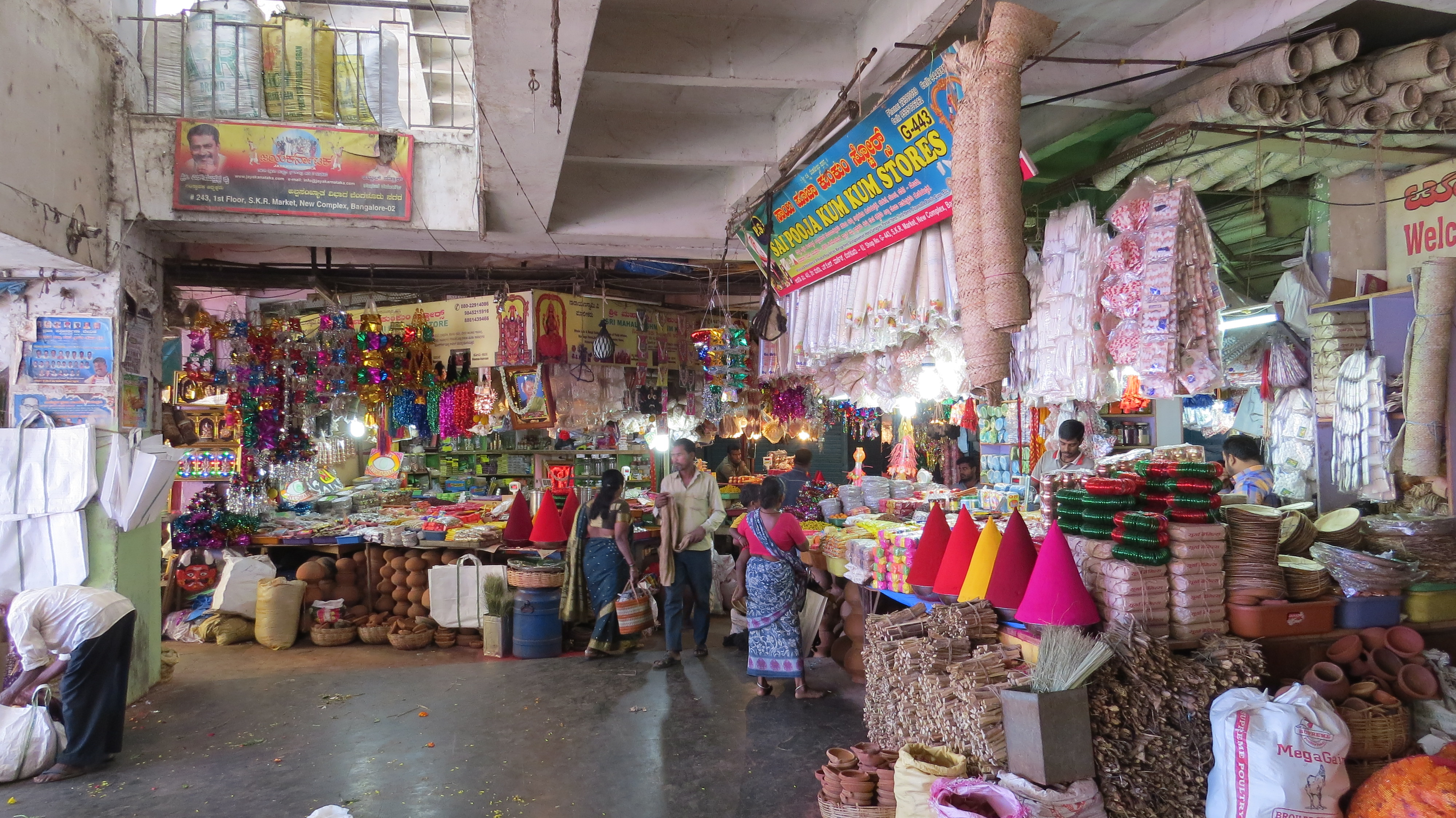
Ground Floor: Dry goods stalls

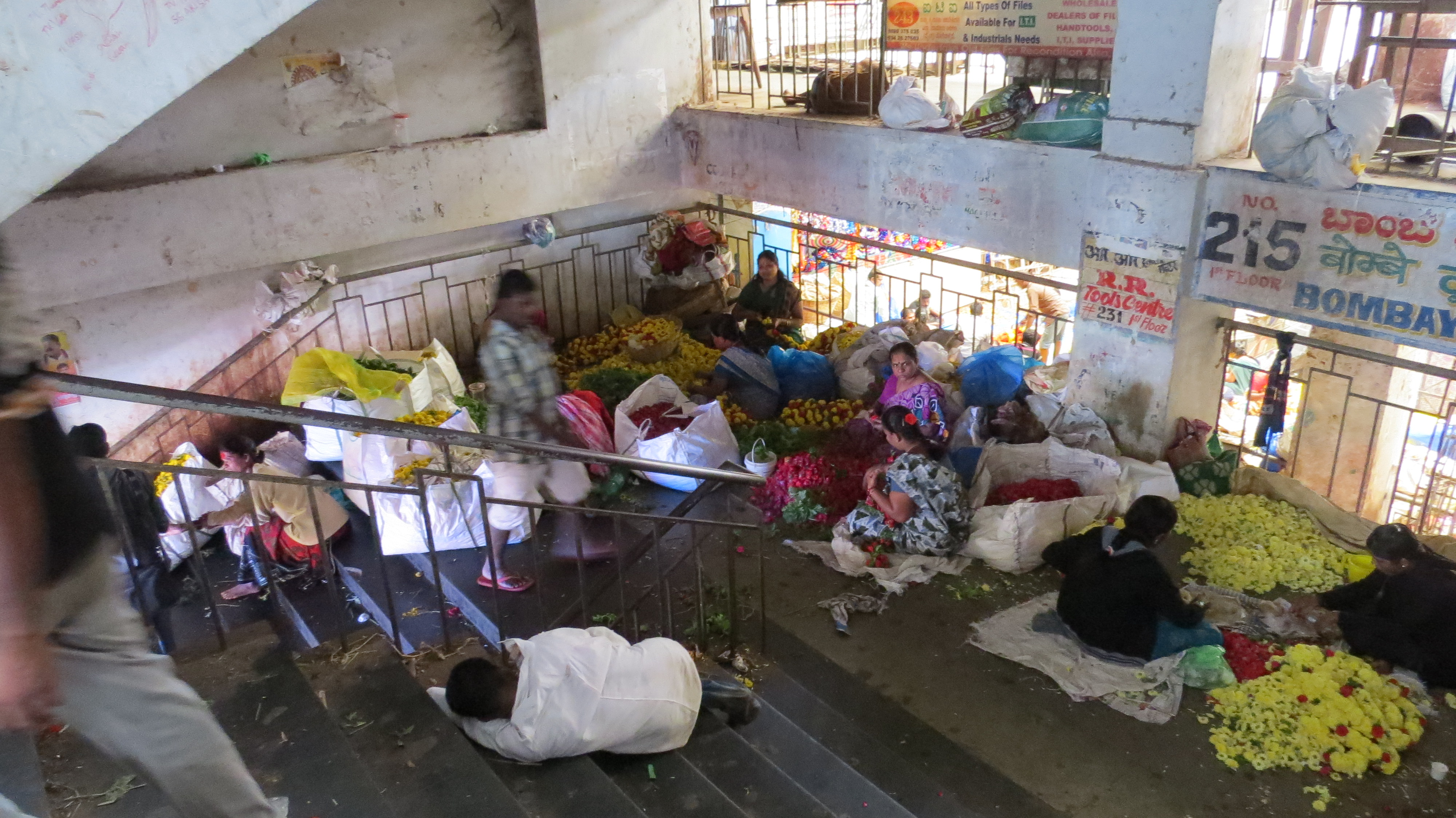
Staircase to the first floor

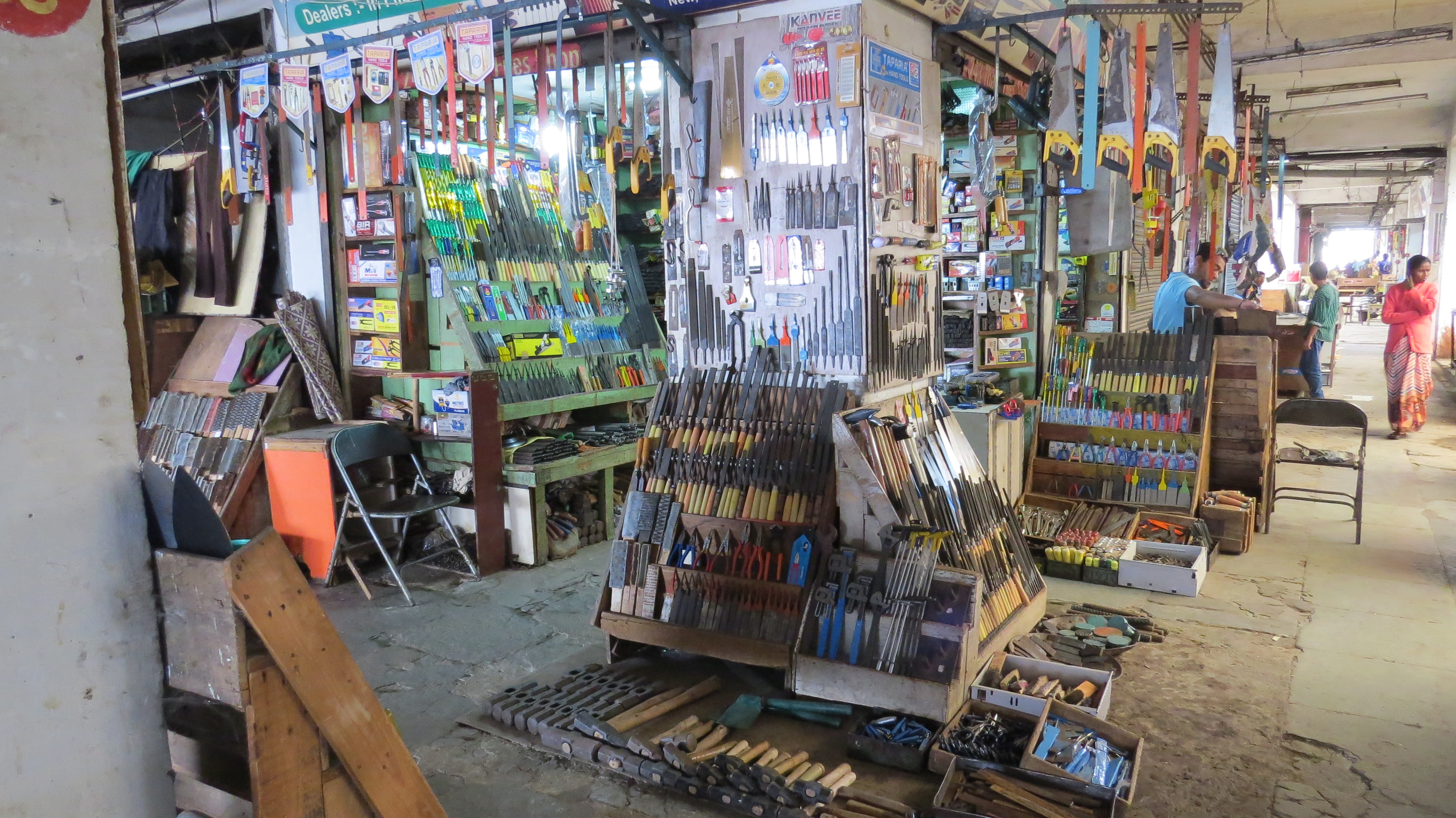
First floor: Tools and machine-tools stalls

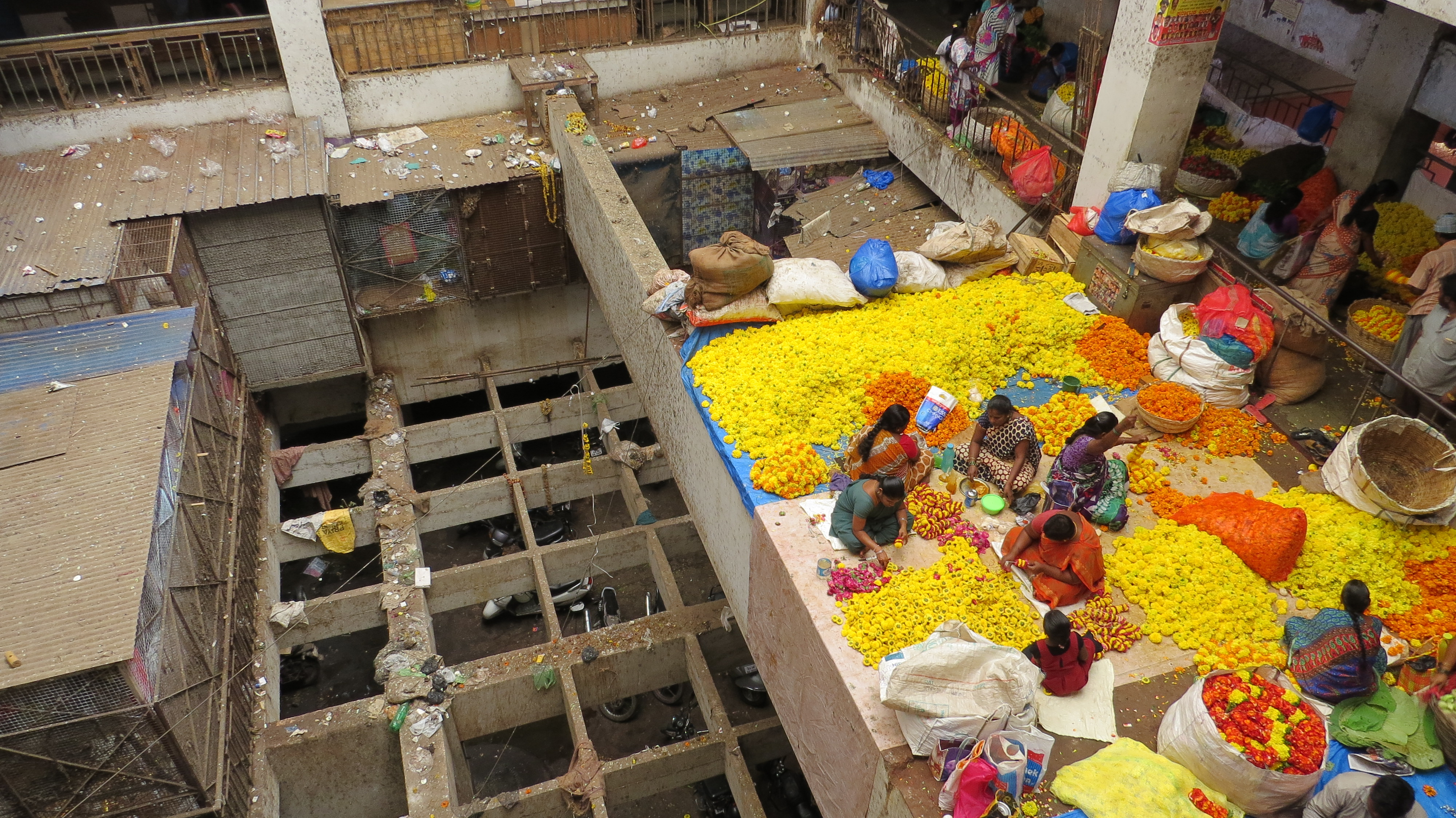
Flower-garland makers working on the intermediate level of one of the central lighting pits (4 in all)

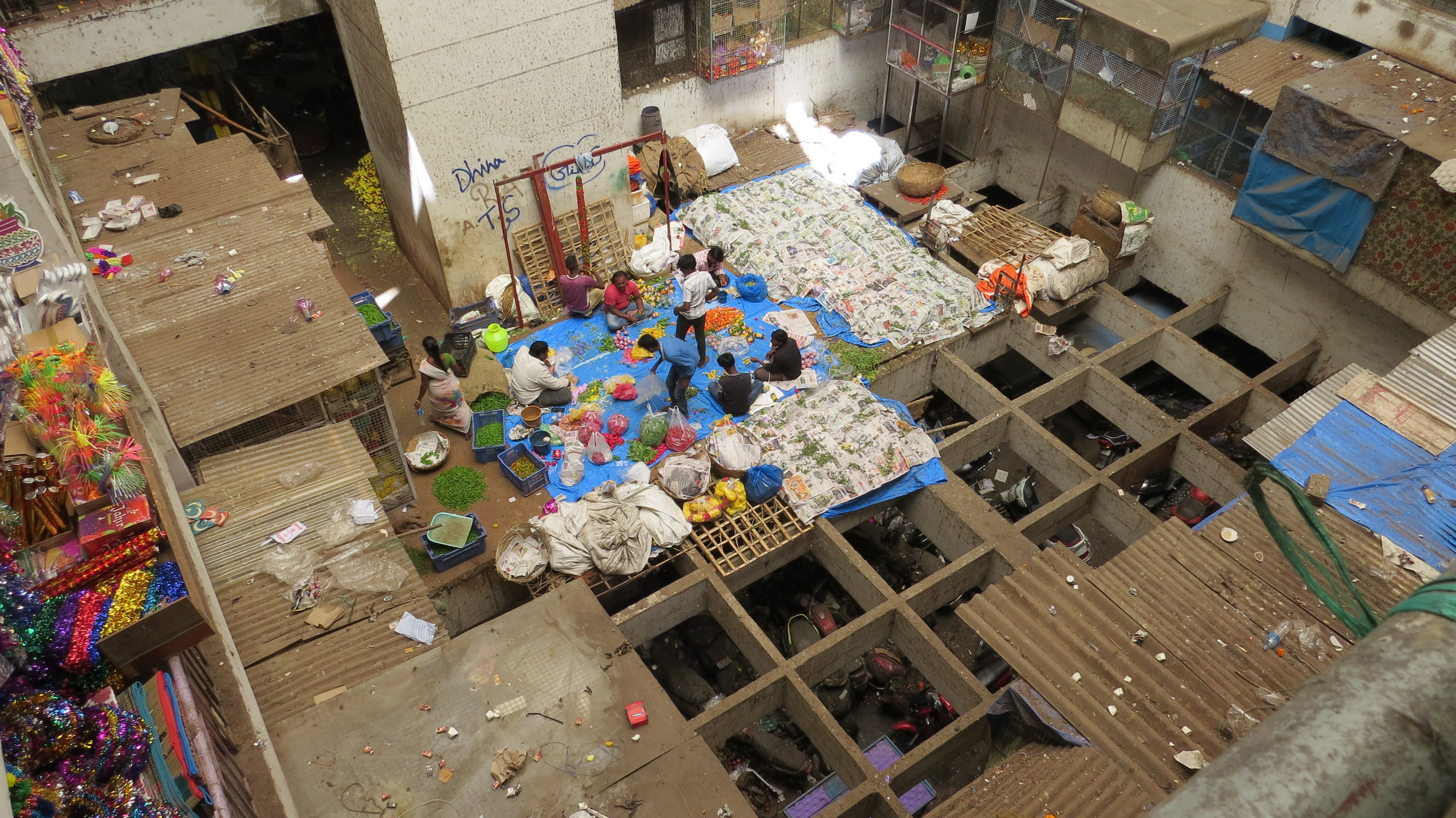
Another lighting pit

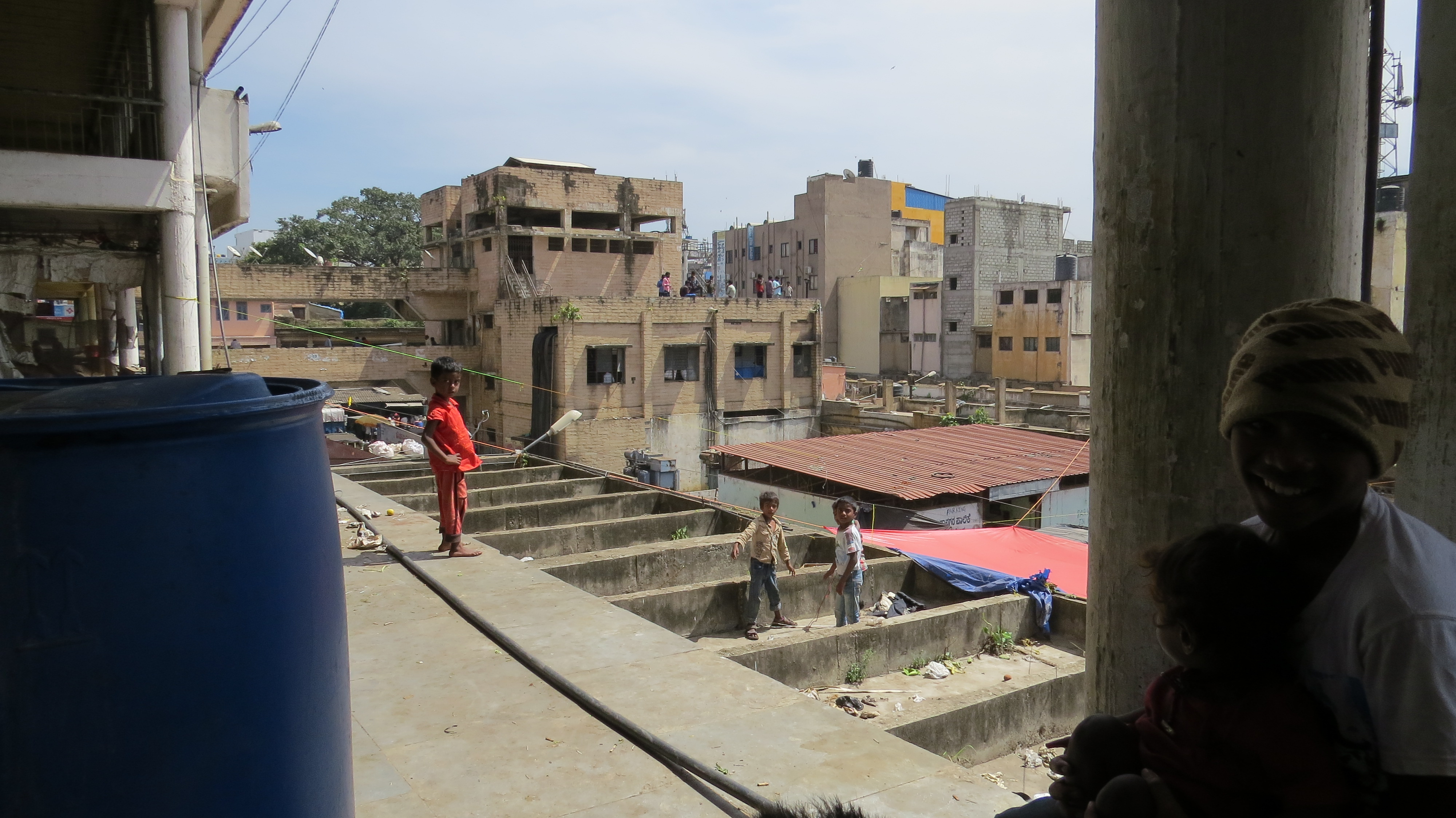
Kids playing on one of the concrete awnings above an entrance

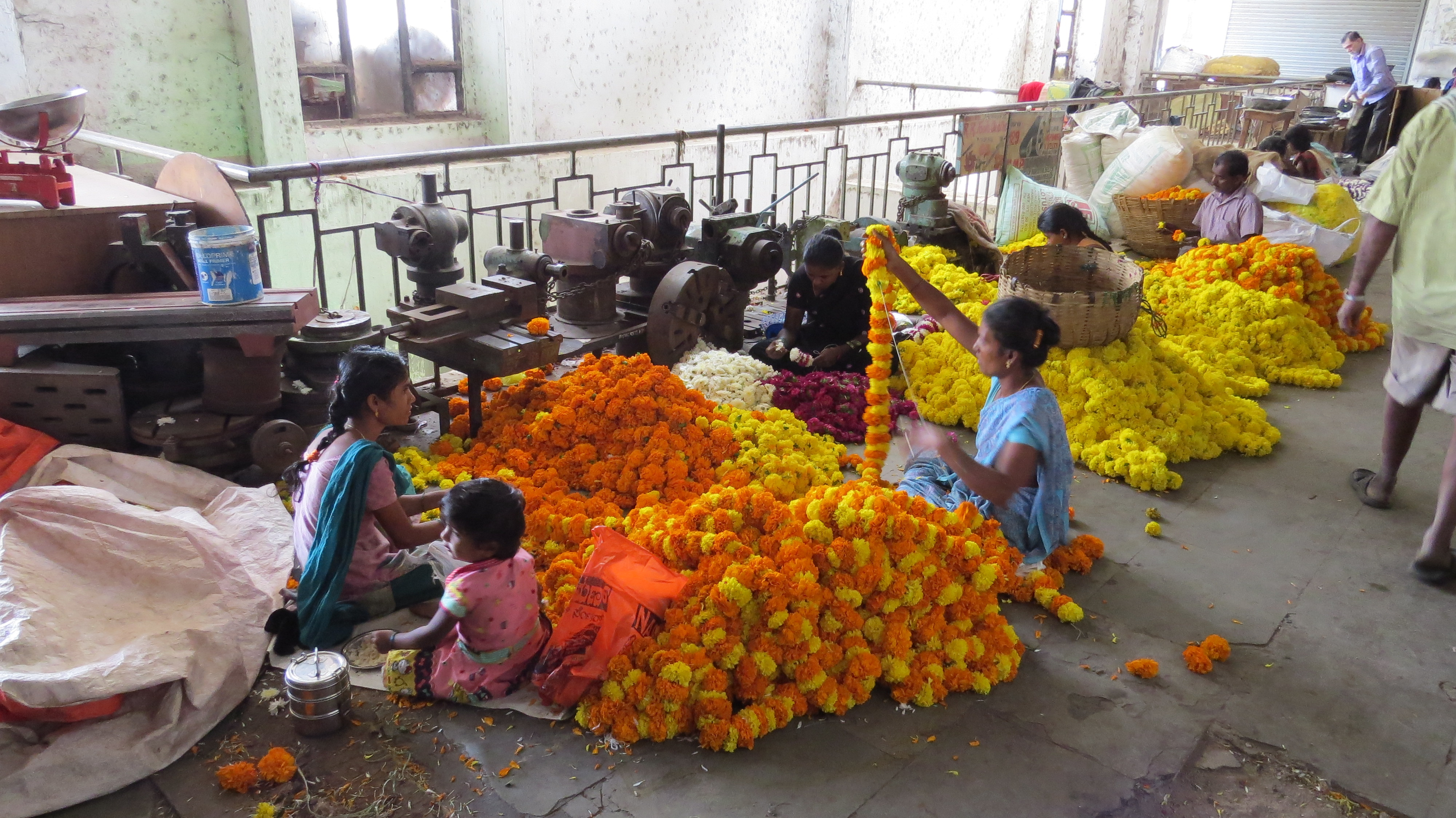
Flower-garland makers working next to decaying machine tools kept for parts on the first floor

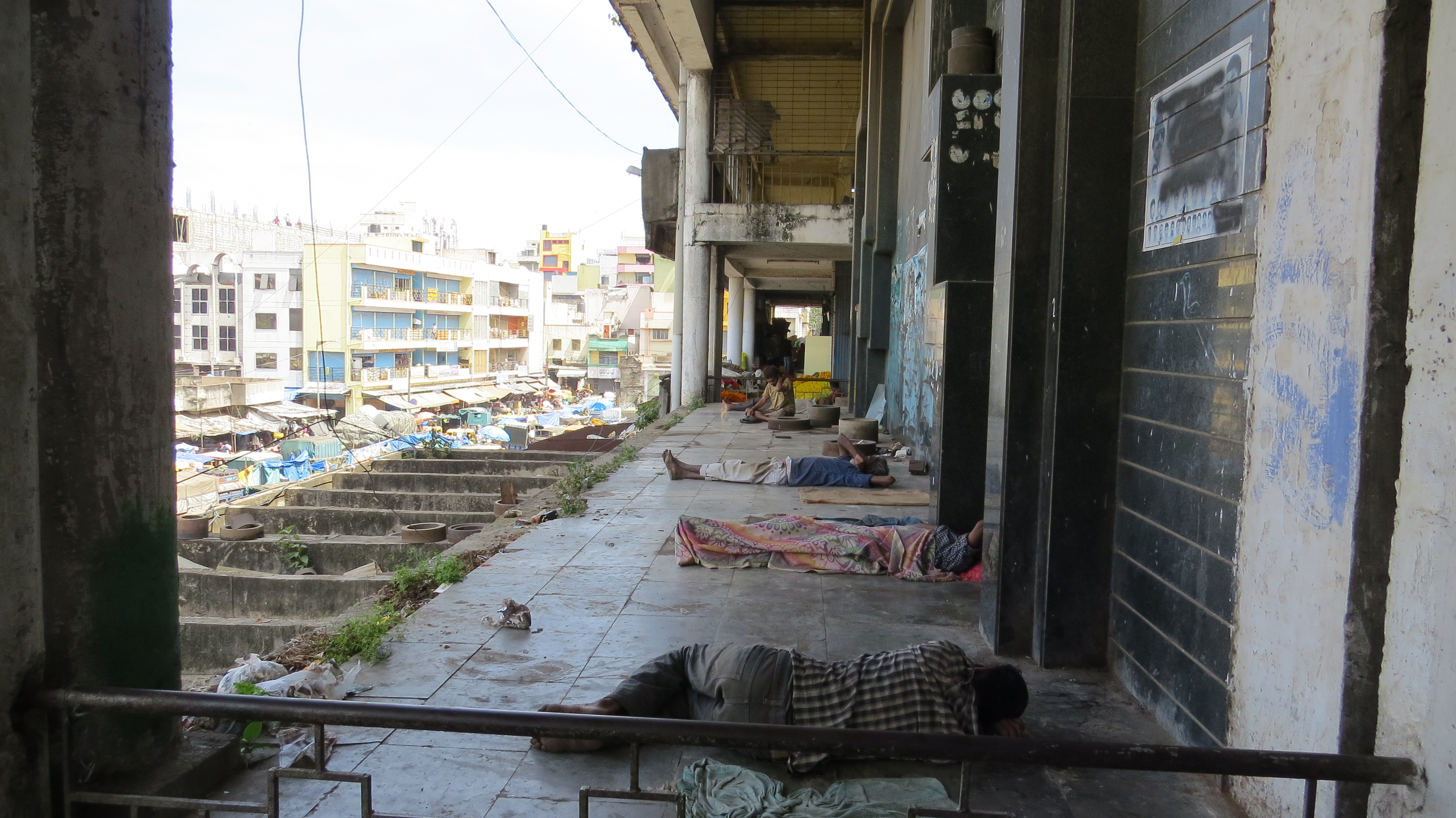
Workers sleeping

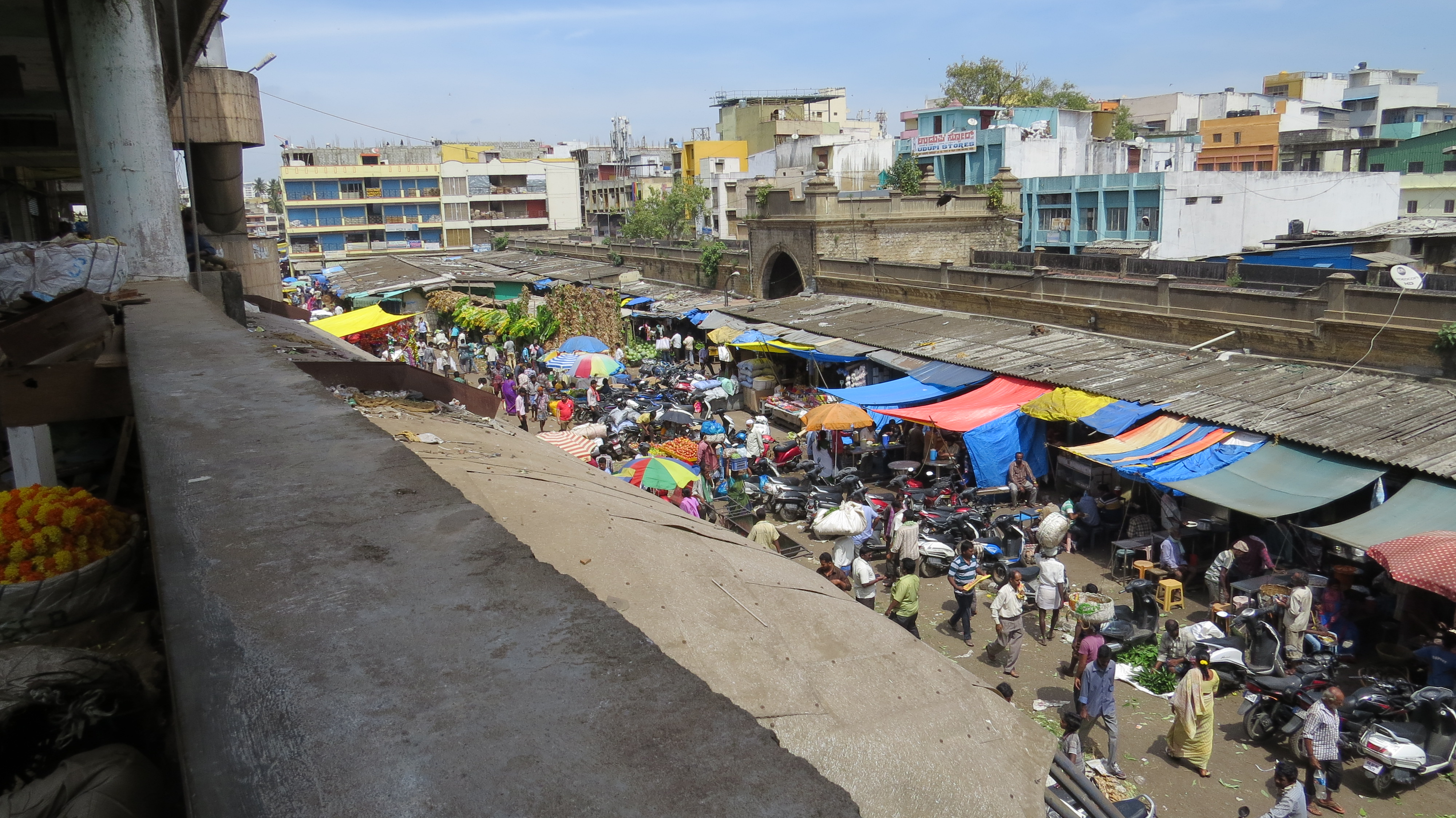
At the back of the modern building, another remnant of the British-era structure

== See also ==
- Bengaluru Pete
