= Kalasipalyam =

- Neighbourhood
- Kalāsipāḷya
- Interactive map of Kalasipalyam
- Coordinates: 12°57′36″N 77°34′44″E
- Country: India
- State: Karnataka
- Metro: Bangalore

Languages
  - Official: Kannada
- Time zone: UTC+5:30 (IST)
- PIN: 560002

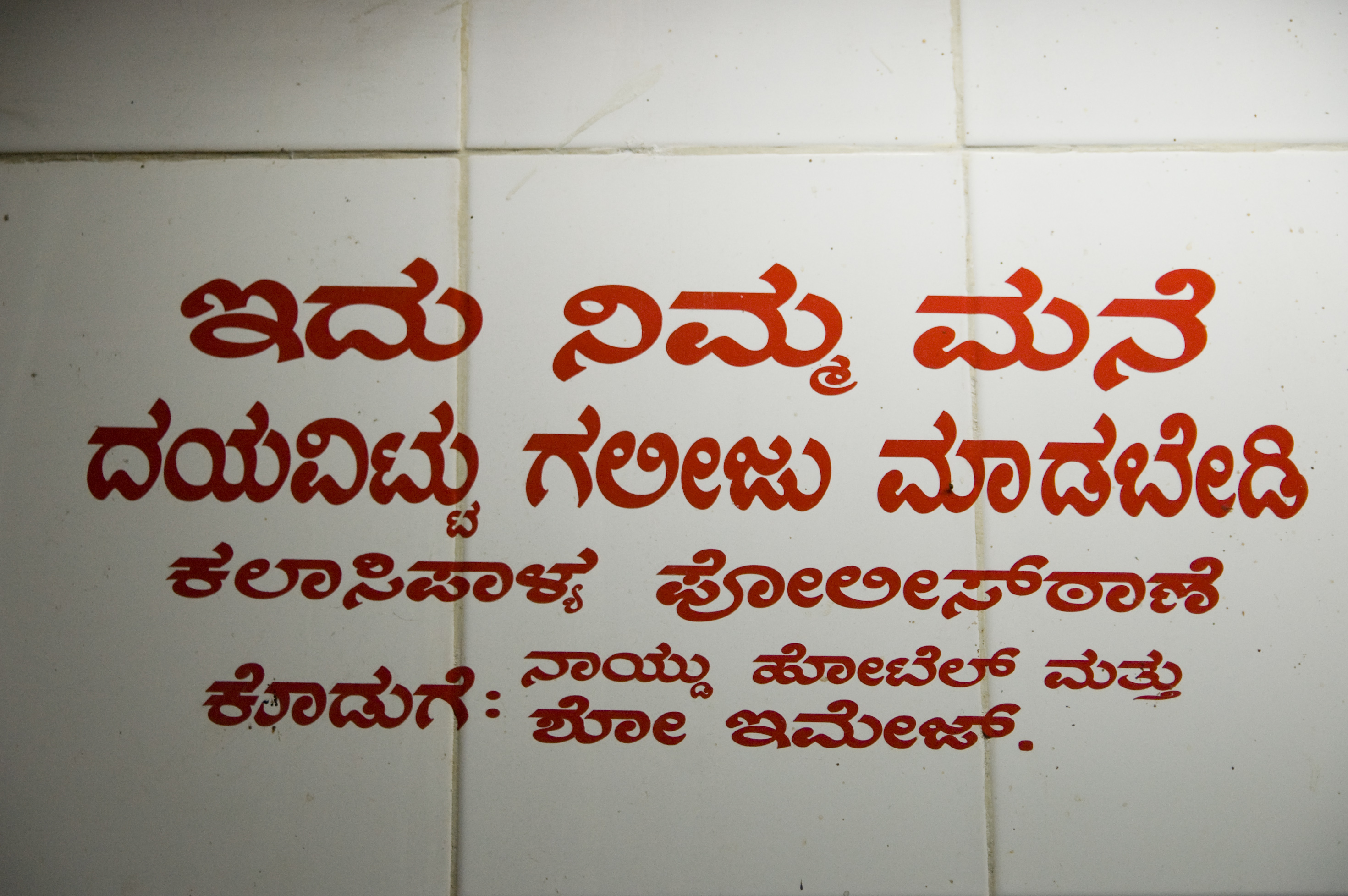
An anti-litter sign in Kannada by Kalasipalyam Police Station which translates to "This is your house. Please do not litter"

Kalasipalyam, also spelled Kalasipalya, is a locality in the central part of Bangalore, Karnataka, India, and one of the older areas in the city. It is home to landmarks such as Bangalore Fort and Tipu Sultan's Summer Palace. The area is known for its high traffic congestion and unhygienic conditions of roads.

== History ==
Kalasipalyam is said to have been created in the latter half of the 18th century during Hyder Ali and Tipu Sultan's rule over Bangalore during which period the city was expanded. The expansion to the east of the fort came to be known as Kalasipalyam; kalasi means "tent-pitchers and organizers of military camps" and palyam means an area of land ruled by a chieftain.

== Transportation system ==
The area has become a transport hub in recent years, with the Kalasipalyam Bus Station serving thousands of intra-city and outstation buses, and an estimated 800,000 passengers per day. Apart from the state-run KSRTC and BMTC buses, hundreds of private buses to southern states of Kerala and Tamil Nadu originate at the station. The station was said to have been constructed in the 1920s. The bus station is infamous for its garbage dumping, open urinals and muddy ground. In 2016, it was announced that the BMTC would replace the existing bus station, which was plagued by craters and filth, with a new terminal at a cost of ₹60 crore and ready for operation in two years.

In June 2017, the K. R. Market station of Namma Metro's Green Line was opened for operation. The station serves the Kalasipalyam area and was labelled as the "gateway to Pete areas". Apart from the fort and the palace, the station is surrounded by Bangalore Medical College, Victoria Hospital, Vanivilas Hospital, Minto Eye Hospital, Kalasipalyam Bus Station and K. R. Market.

== Markets and religious sites ==
Kalasipalyam is also a market hub with K. R. Market located in the area and the Pete area located in close proximity. The locality is said to have been of religious importance to Hindus and Muslims who believed it to be the place where saints walked. The Kote Venkataramana Temple and the Kote Jalakantheshwara temple are situated on the Krishnarajendra Road in Kalasipalyam.

== See also ==
- History of Bangalore
