= Kote Jalakantheshwara temple =

Coordinates: 12.961420°N 77.576486°E

Religion
- Affiliation: Hinduism
- District: Bangalore
- Deity: Lord Shiva

Location
- Location: Kalasipalya Bus Stand, Bangalore
- State: Karnataka
- Country: India
- Interactive map of Kote Jalakantheshwara temple

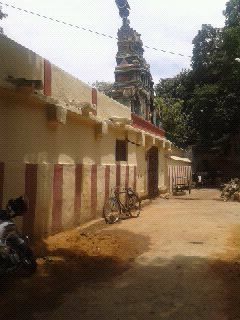
Entrance to Jalakantheshwara temple

A temple dedicated to the Hindu God Shiva located near the Kalasipalya Bus Stand, Bangalore, Karnataka, India. The temple dates back to the Chola era and was renovated by Kempegowda. The unique feature of this temple is it contains three sanctums dedicated to Jalakantheshwara, Parvathi and Kailashnathar.
