= Tipu Sultan's Summer Palace =

Building in Bangalore, India

Coordinates: 12°57′34.18″N 77°34′24.86″E

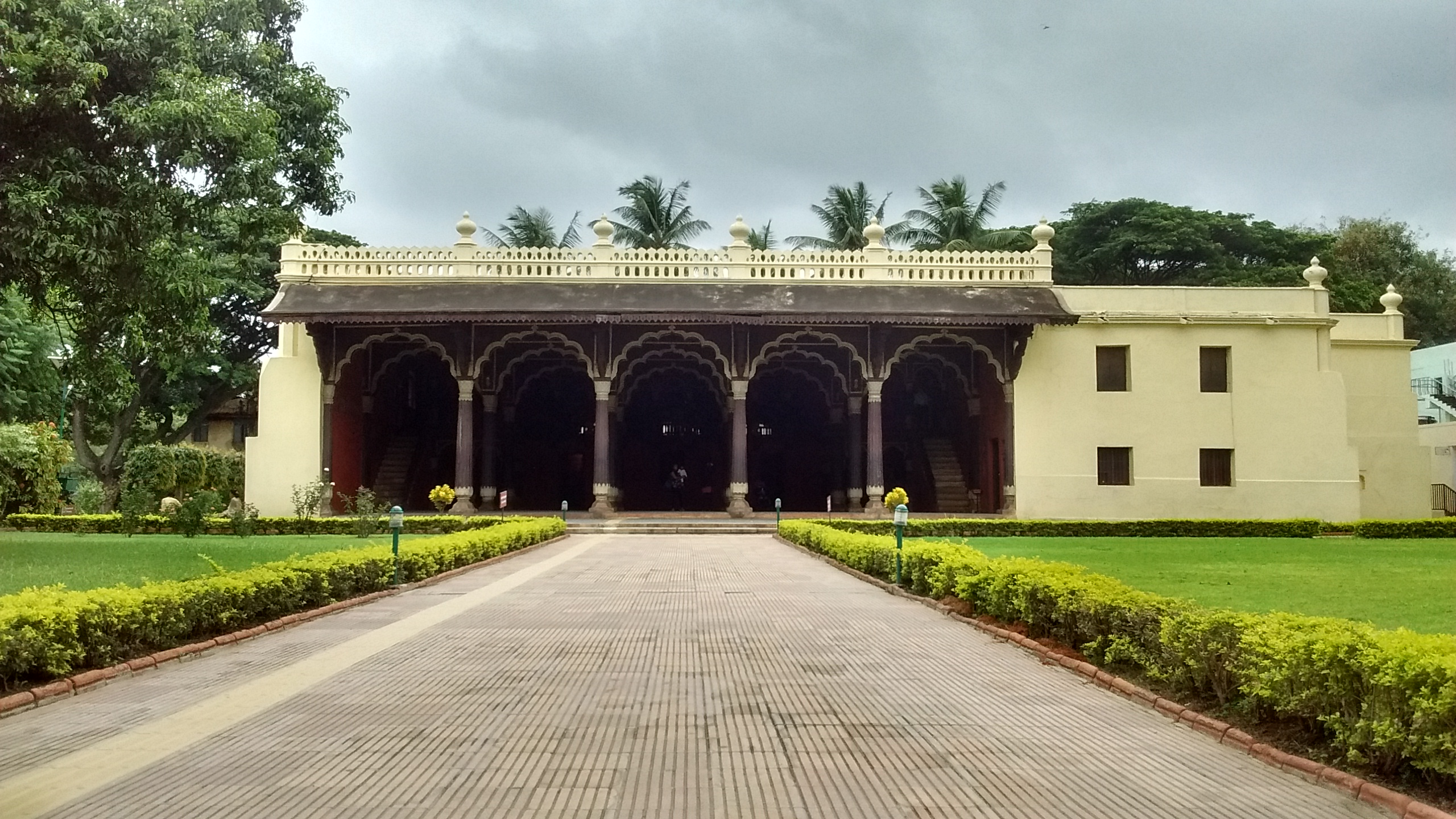
- Façade of the Palace
- Interactive map of the Tipu Sultan's Summer Palace area

General information
- Architectural style: Indo-Islamic
- Location: Bangalore, Karnataka, India
- Construction started: 1781
- Completed: 1791
- Owner: Tipu Sultan (1791-1799); Archeological Survey of India (present)

Tipu Sultan's Summer Palace, in Bangalore, India, is an example of Indo-Islamic architecture and was the summer residence of the Mysorean ruler Tipu Sultan. Hyder Ali commenced its construction within the walls of the Bangalore Fort in 1781, and it was completed during the reign of Tipu Sultan 10 years later in 1791. After Tipu Sultan died in the Fourth Anglo-Mysore War, the British Administration used the palace for its secretariat before moving to Attara Kacheri in 1868. Today the Archaeological Survey of India maintains the palace, which is located at the center of Old Bangalore near the Kalasipalya bus stand, as a tourist spot. Entry fee is ₹20 for Indian citizens, while for foreign visitors is ₹200 (US$2.40).

The structure was built entirely of teak and stands adorned with pillars, arches and balconies. It is believed that Tipu Sultan used to conduct his durbar (court) from the eastern and western balconies of the upper floor. There are four smaller rooms in the corners of first floor which were Zenana Quarters. There are beautiful floral motifs embellishing the walls of the palace. The site also holds a painting of grand throne visualized by Tipu Sultan himself. Coated with gold sheets and adorned with precious emerald stones, Tipu had vowed never to use it until he completely defeated the British Army. After Tipu Sultan, the British dismantled the throne and auctioned its parts as it was too expensive for a single person to buy whole.

The rooms in the ground floor have been converted into a small museum showcasing various achievements of Tipu Sultan and his administration. There are newly done portraits of the people and places of that time. There is a replica of Tipu Sultan's Tiger, which is in the Victoria and Albert Museum in London. Tipu Sultan's clothes and his crown are present in silver and gold pedestals. The silver vessels given by a general to Hyder Ali is also displayed.

The Horticulture Department, Government of Karnataka, maintains the area in front of the palace as a garden and lawn.

== Inscriptions ==
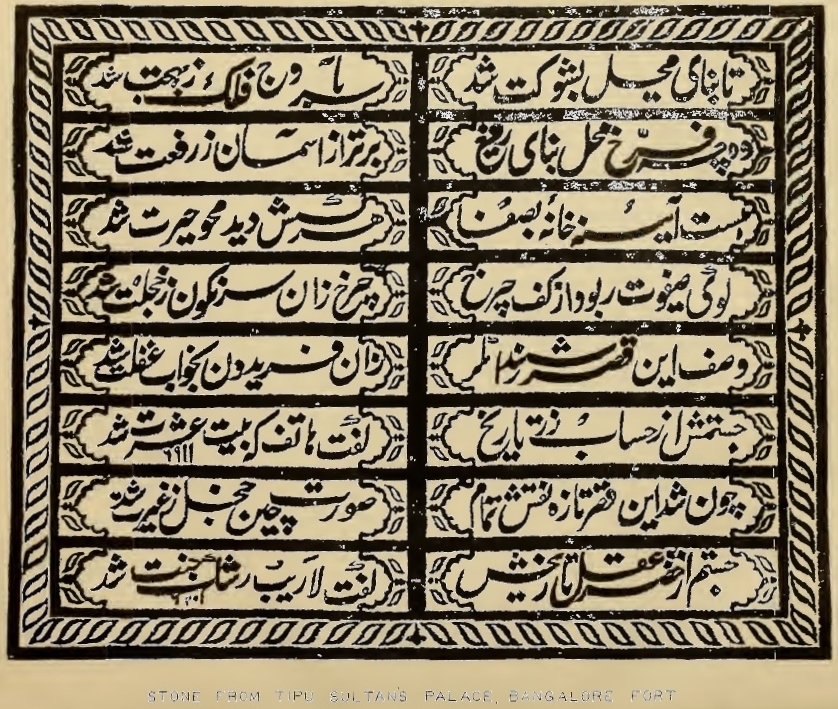
Farsi inscription at Tipu Sultan's Palace by Benjamin Lewis Rice

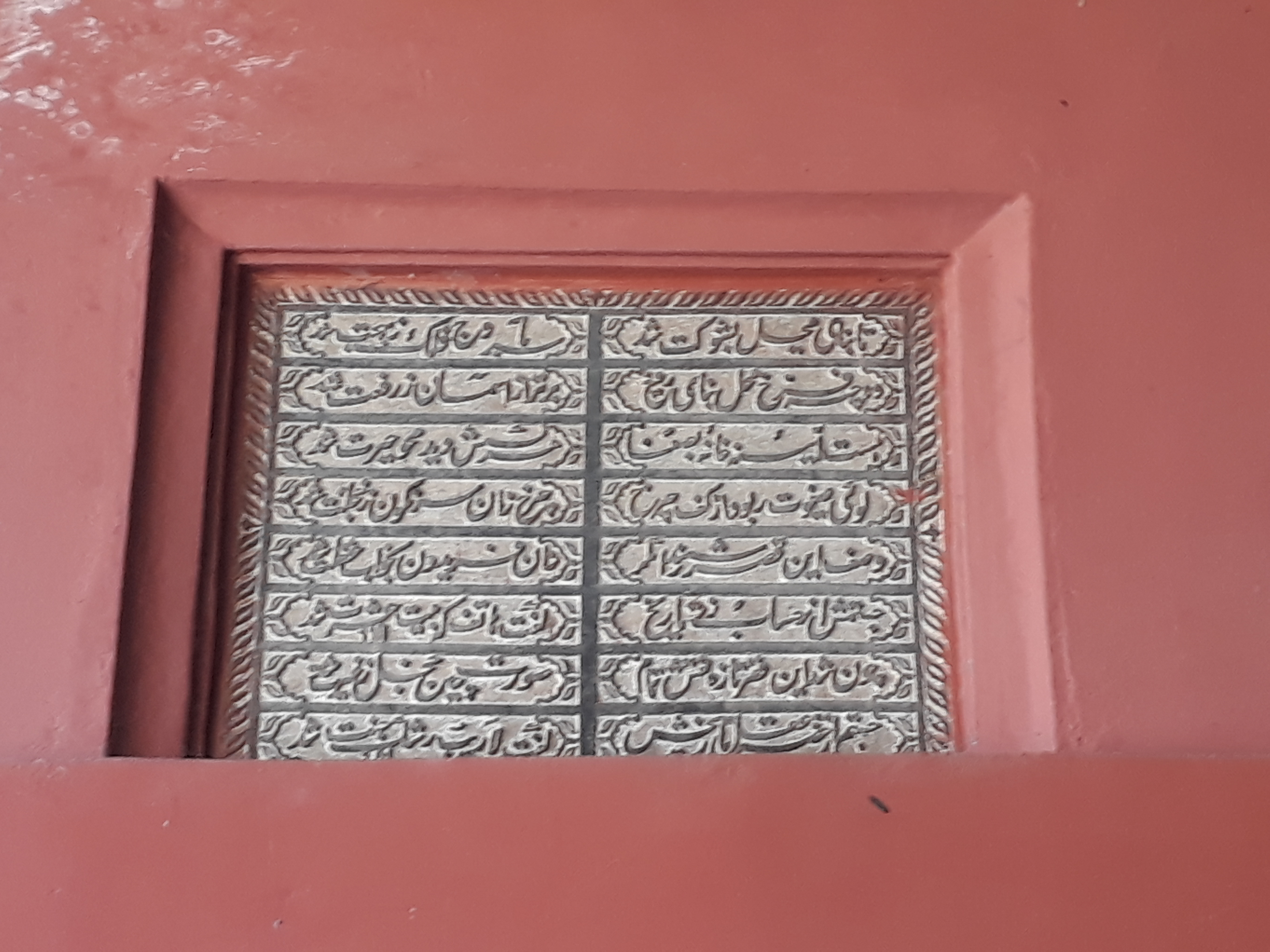
Photo of the Farsi inscription at Tipu Sultan's Palace

Farsi Inscription (Roman Letters)

Ta. bina e mahal ba shaukat shud
Sar ba anje falak za bohjat shud
Vah che farrokh raahal bina e rafi
Bar tar az asman za rafat shud
Hast aina khaua e ba safa
Har kasash did raahave hirat shud
G6 e safvat rabud az kafe charkh
Charkh ziin sar niguu za khijlat shud
Vasfe in khasr ra shunid magar
Zan FaiiJun ba khabe ghalat shud
Justamash az hisabe Zar tarikh
Goft Hatif ke baite ishrat shud
Chun ahud in khasre taza nakhsh tamam
Surate Chin khajil za ghirat shud
Justam az khizre akhl tarikhash
Goft laraib rashke jannat shud
DaU 1791 A.D.

English Translation

As soon as the foundation of this palace was laid,
its head was raised to heaven with joy.
Oh, what a lofty mansion, a home of happiness,
its summit being above the skies.
It is a house of glass in purity,
all who see it are struck with wonder.
In magnificence it rivals the sky,
which hangs down its head with shame.
The description alone of this palace, when heard by Faridiin,
It caused hira to go to his long sleep.
I sought by computation according to Zar(2) for the date,
and an unseen angel said—"A house of happiness," 1196(1781 A.D.).
When the painting of this new palace was finished,
it cast the beauty of China into oblivion.
I sought for this date from Khizir(3) the wise,
who said— "Doubtless it is envied by heaven,"
1206(1791 A.D.)

(2)Zar – A system invented by Tipu Sultan, calculating by abtas instead of the ordinary abjad, the Arab notation in common use among Muhammadans. (See Mysore Gazetteer, revised edition of 1897, Vol. I, Appendix, p. 812)

(3)A prophet who was minister to a king of Persia. He discovered and drank of the fountain of life and became immortal. By some he is confused with the prophet Elias, and likewise with St. George of England, whom they call Khizir Elias.

== Vintage Gallery ==
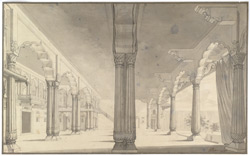
British Period Engravings of the King Tipu of Mysore Palace at Bangalore by Robert Home (1752–1834)

=== Sketches of James Hunter ===
James Hunter served as a lieutenant in the Artillery. He was a military painter, and his sketches portrayed aspects and everyday life. Hunter served the British India Army and took part in Tippu Sultan Campaigns.

Hunter has sketched different landscapes of South India, including Bangalore, Mysore, Hosur, Kancheepuram, Madras, Arcot, Sriperumbudur, etc. These paintings were published in 'A Brief history of ancient and modern India embellished with coloured engravings', published by Edward Orme, London between 1802 and 1805, and 'Picturesque scenery in the Kingdom of Mysore' published by Edward Orme in 1804.

Hunter died in India in 1792. Some of his paintings of Bangalore Palace are below.

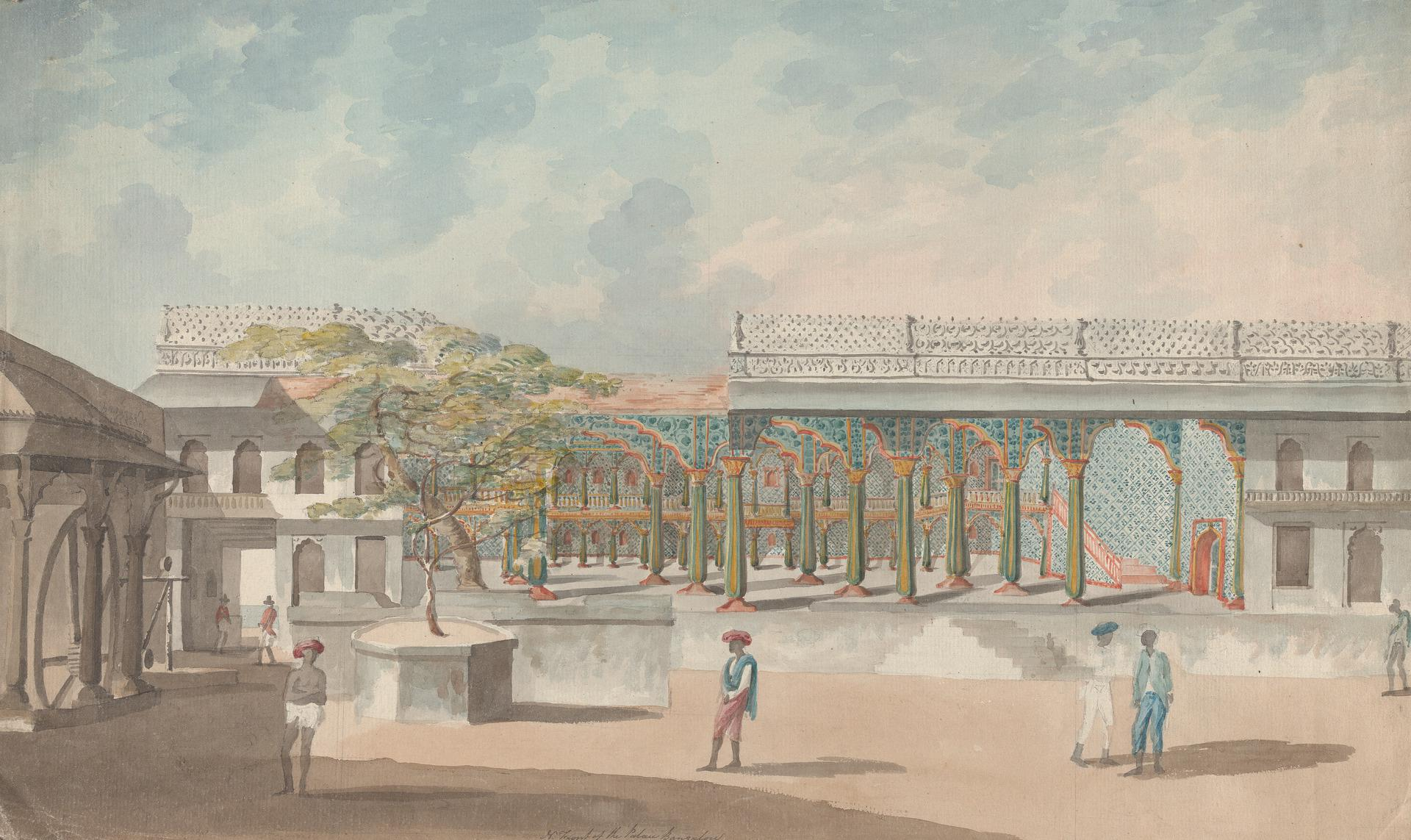
'Yale Center at Bangalore' and 'The Entrance of Tippoo's Palace, Bangalore Feb 92, by James Hunter (d.1792)

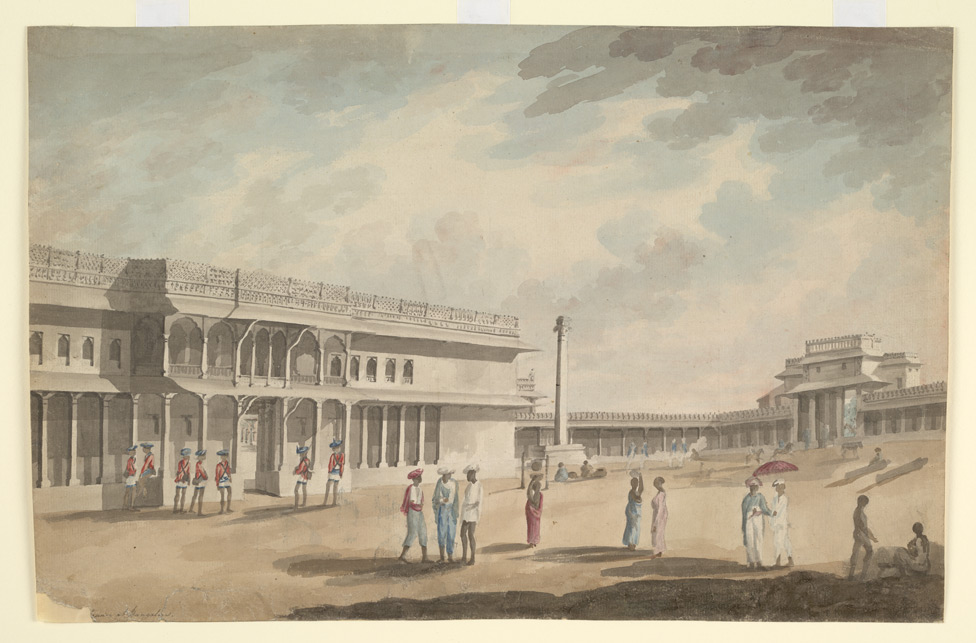
'Square at Bangalore' and 'The Entrance of Tippoo's Palace, Bangalore Feb 92, by James Hunter (d.1792)

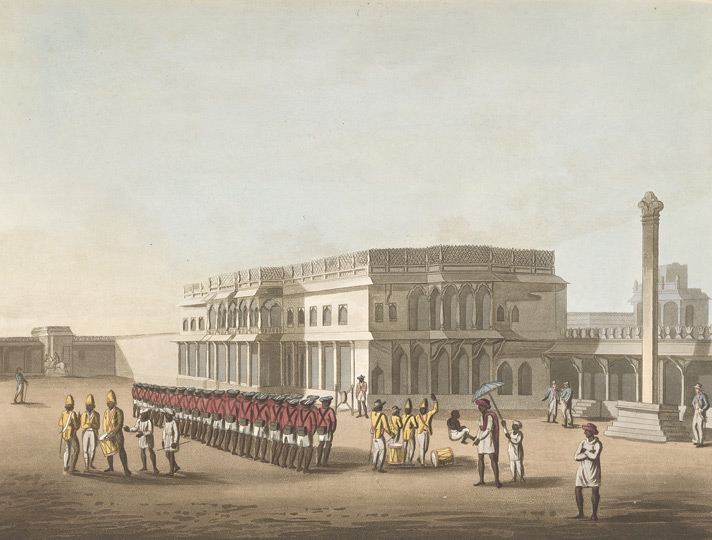
North Entrance Of Tippoo's Palace At Bangalore, by James Hunter (d.1792)

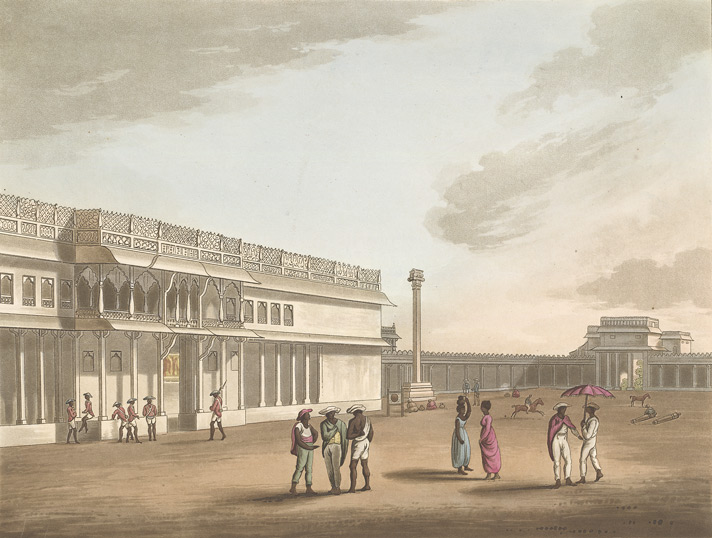
The Square And Entrance Into Tipu's Palace, Bangalore, by James Hunter (d.1792)

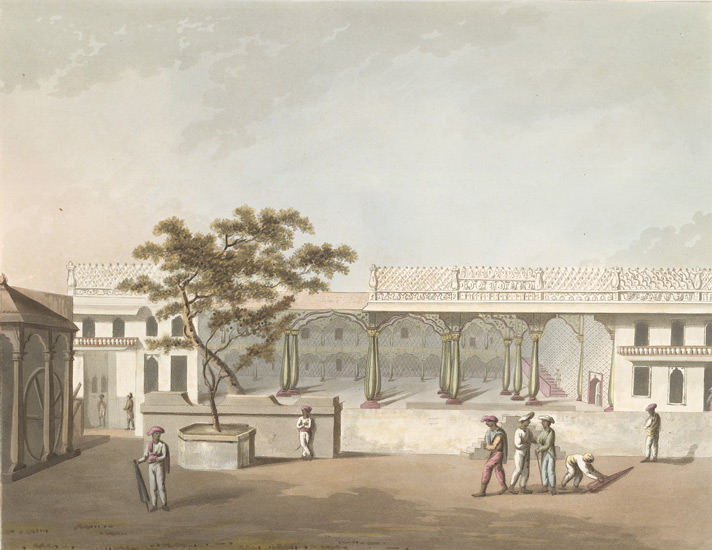
North Front Of Tippoo's Palace, Bangalore, by James Hunter (d.1792)

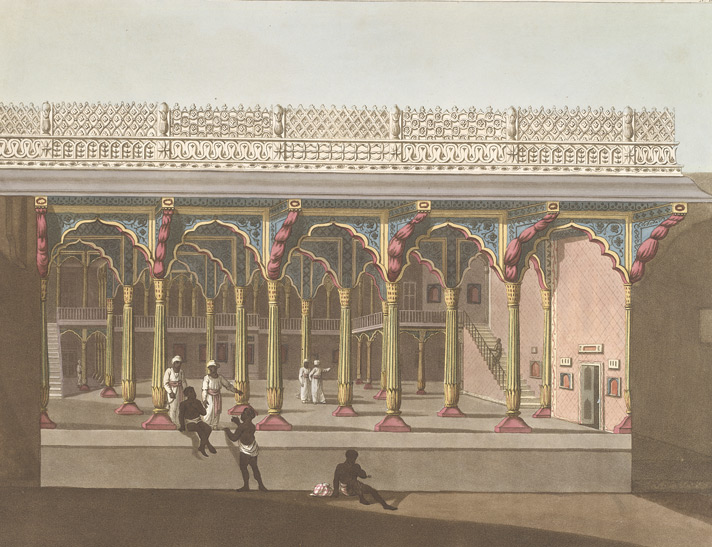
West Front Of Tippoo's Palace, Bangalore by James Hunter (d.1792)

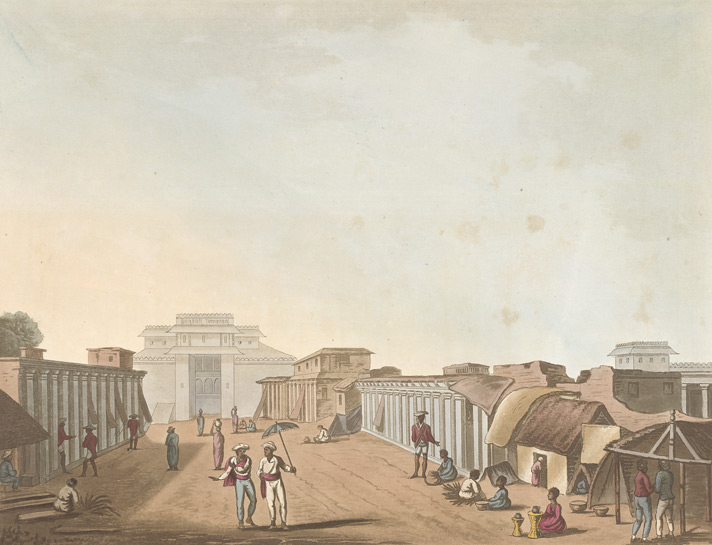
A Street Leading To The Palace Of Bangalore by James Hunter (d.1792) (the gateway in the end is on the right side of next 2 photos)

== Gallery ==
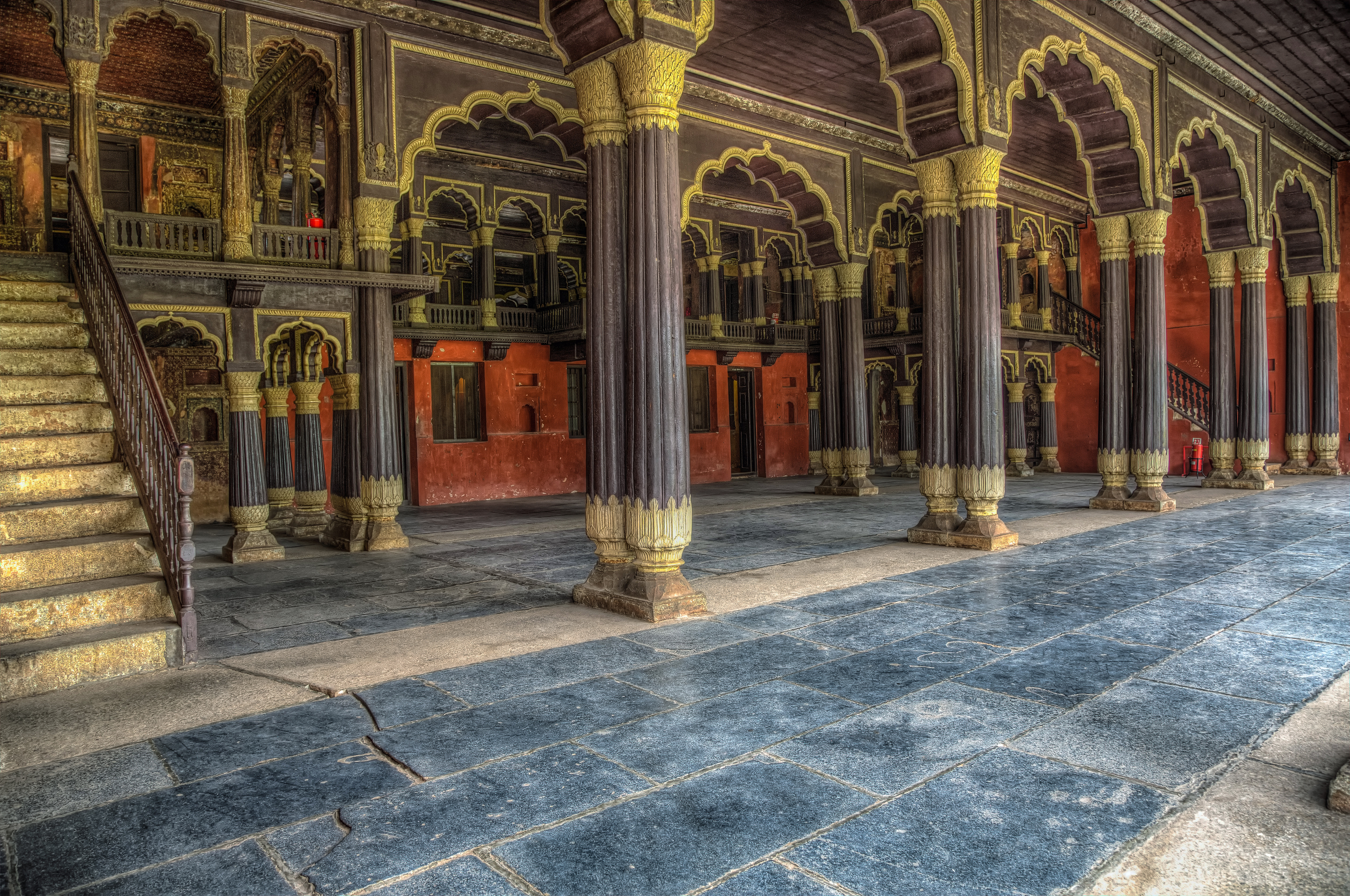
Hall

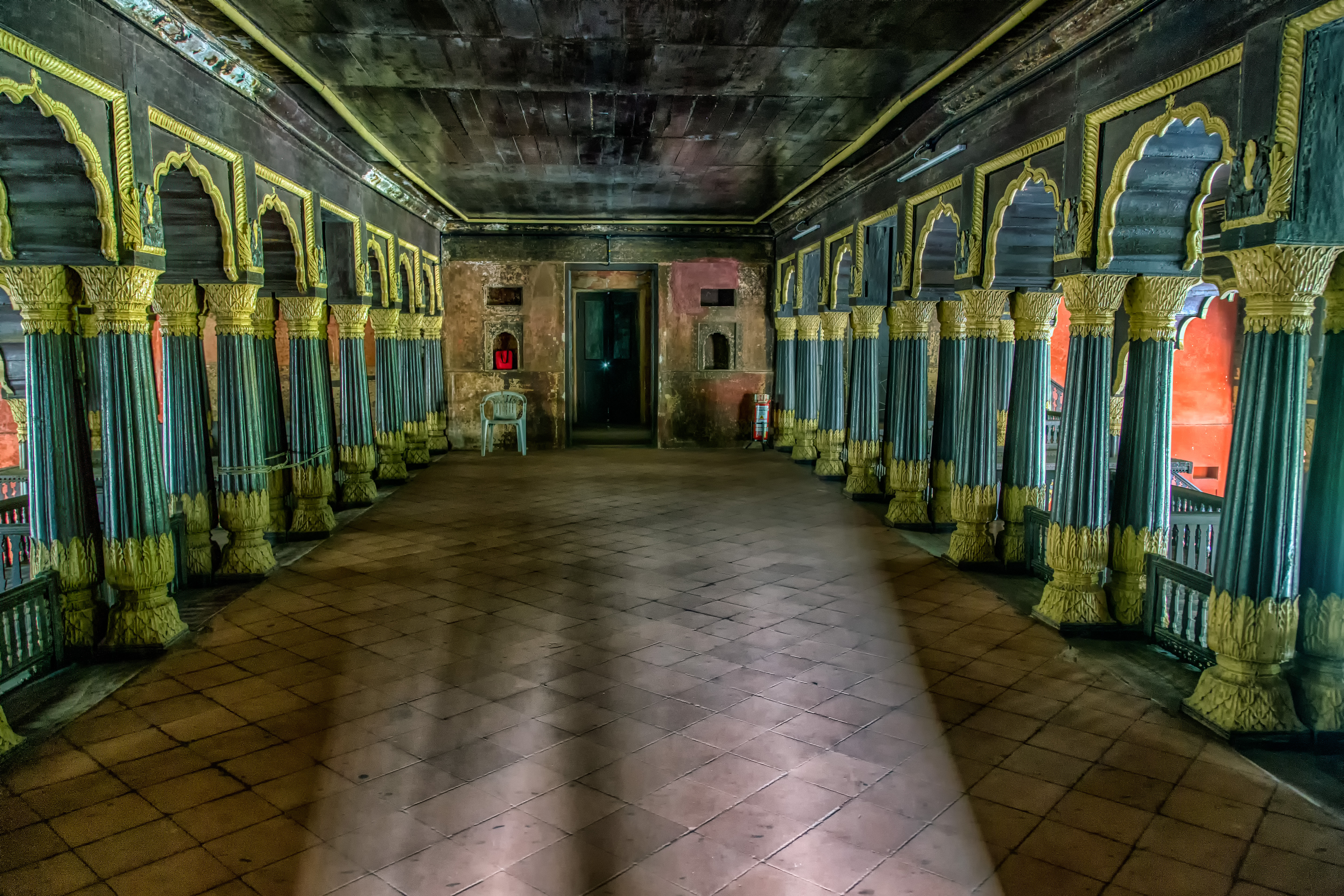
Passageway of the Palace

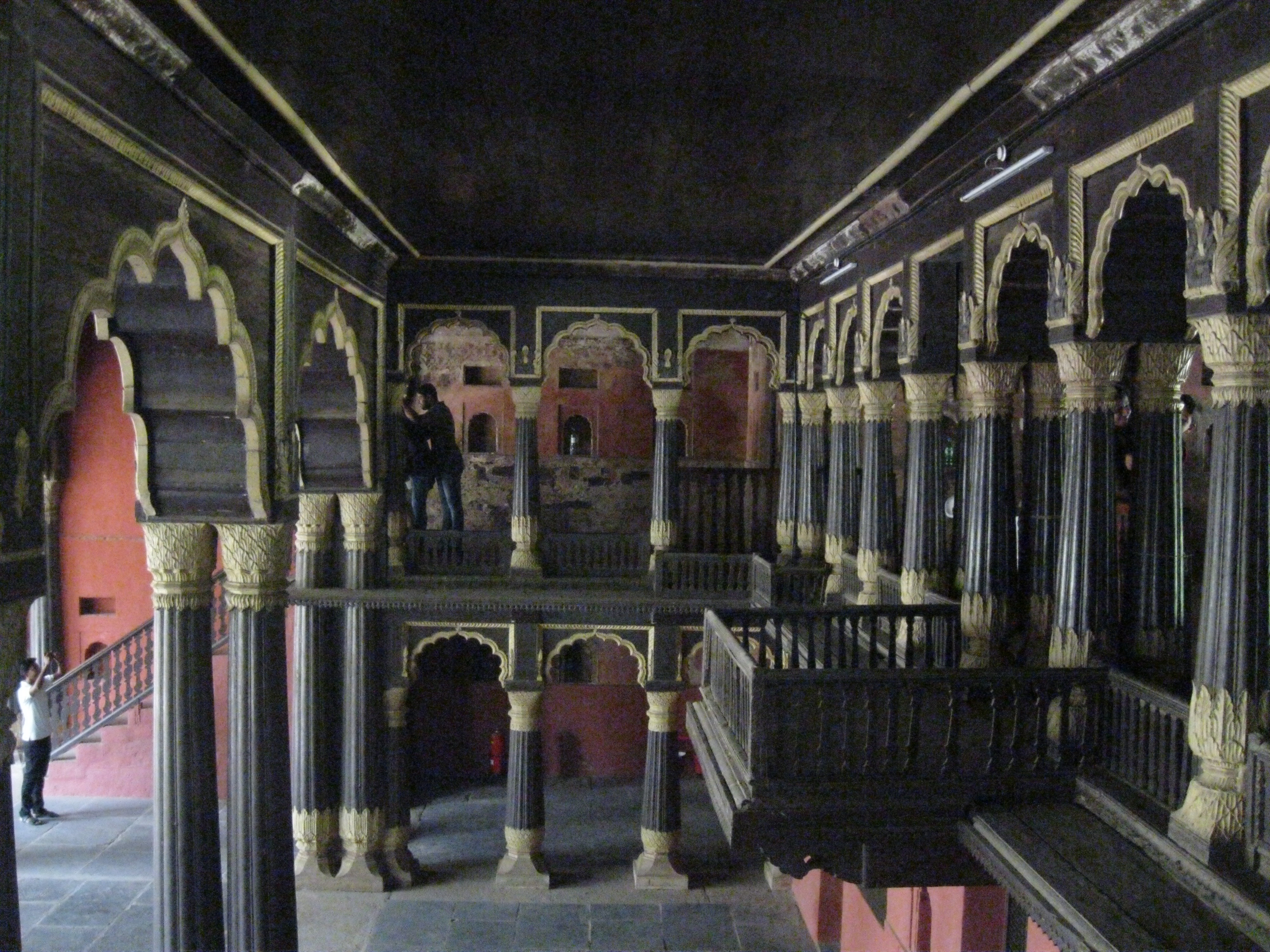

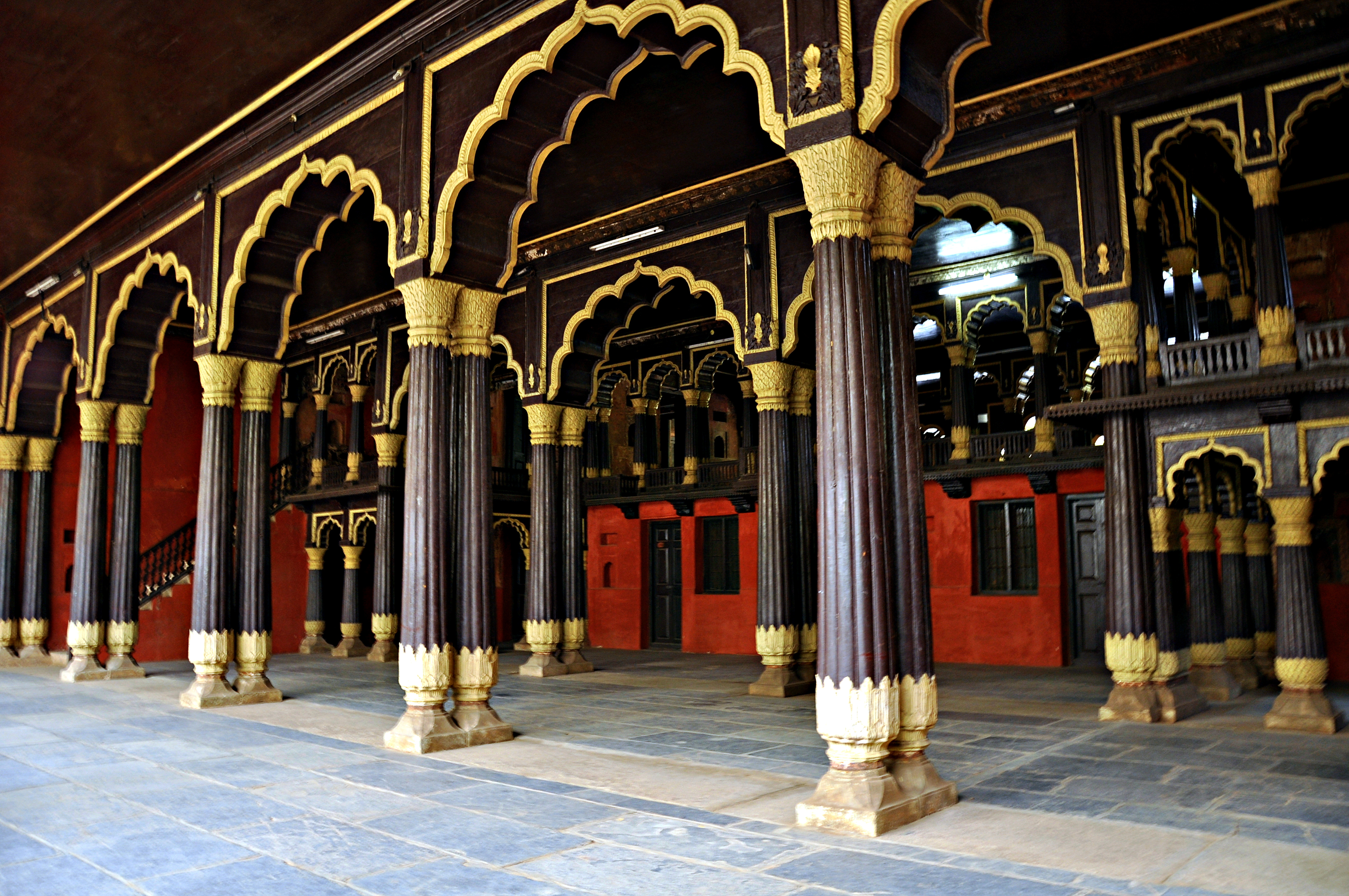

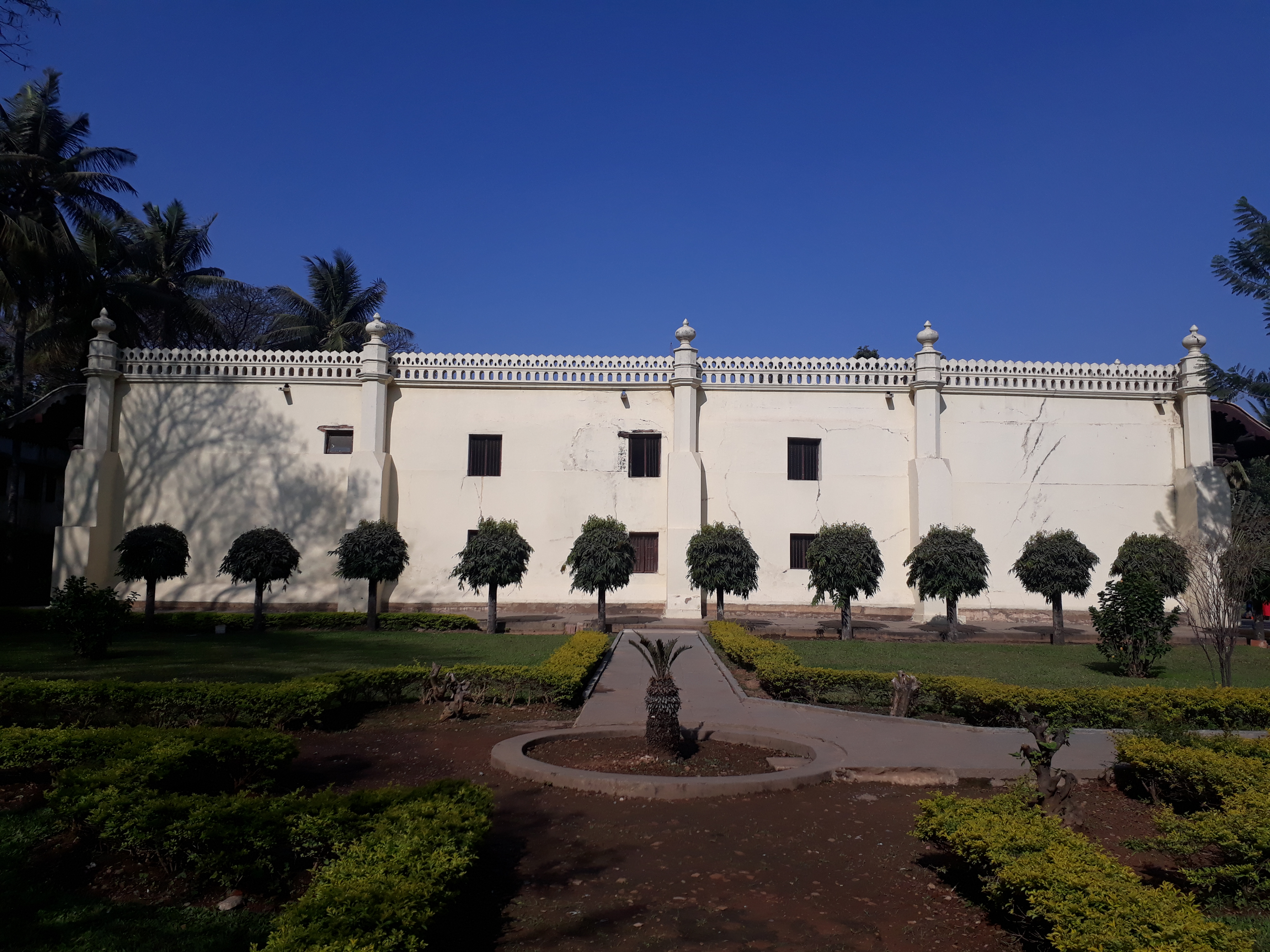
side view

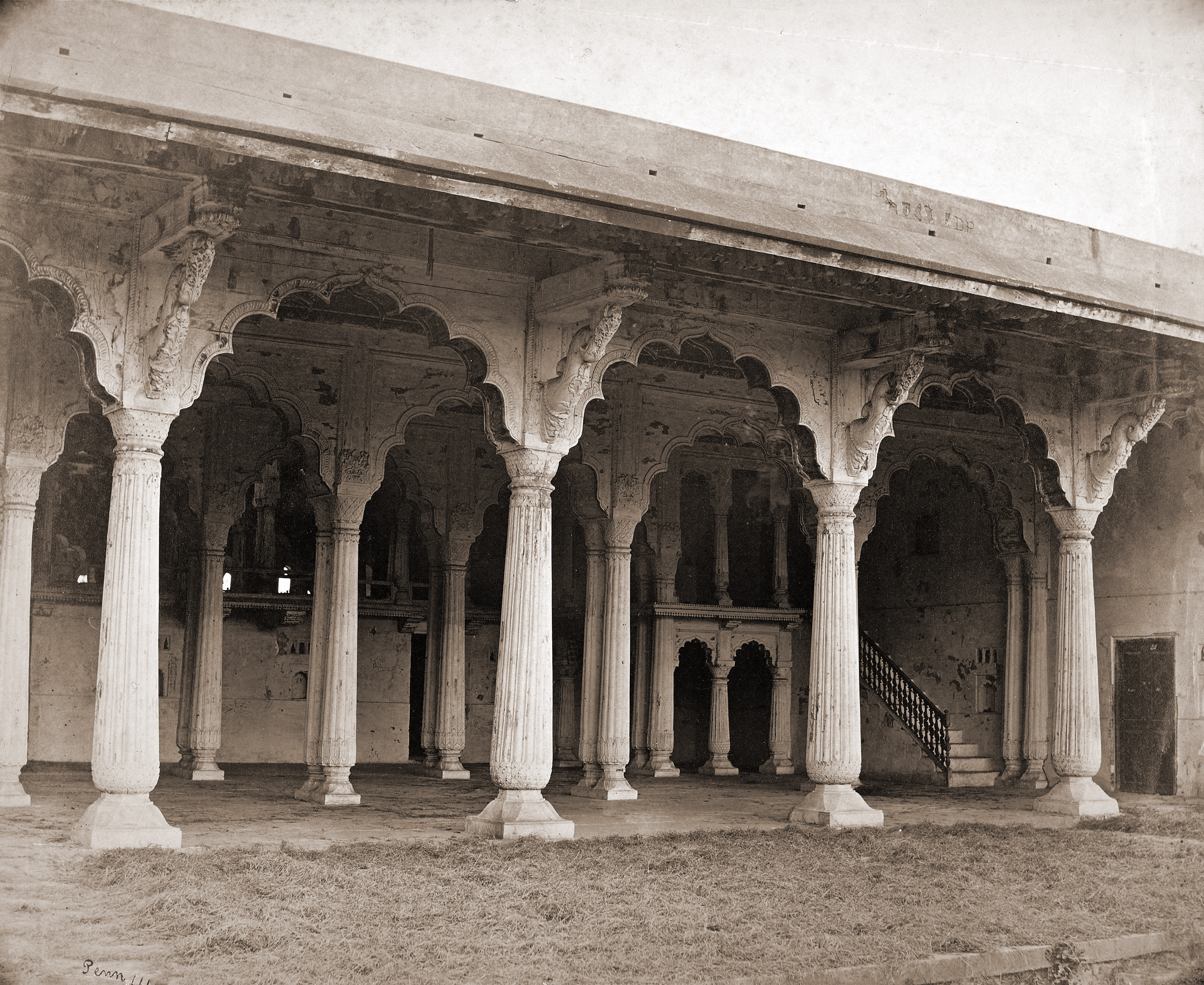
The Old Palace in the Fort, Bangalore by Albert Thomas Penn, 1870
