= Kaikondrahalli inscriptions and hero stones =

Coordinates: 12.91069°N 77.6807°E

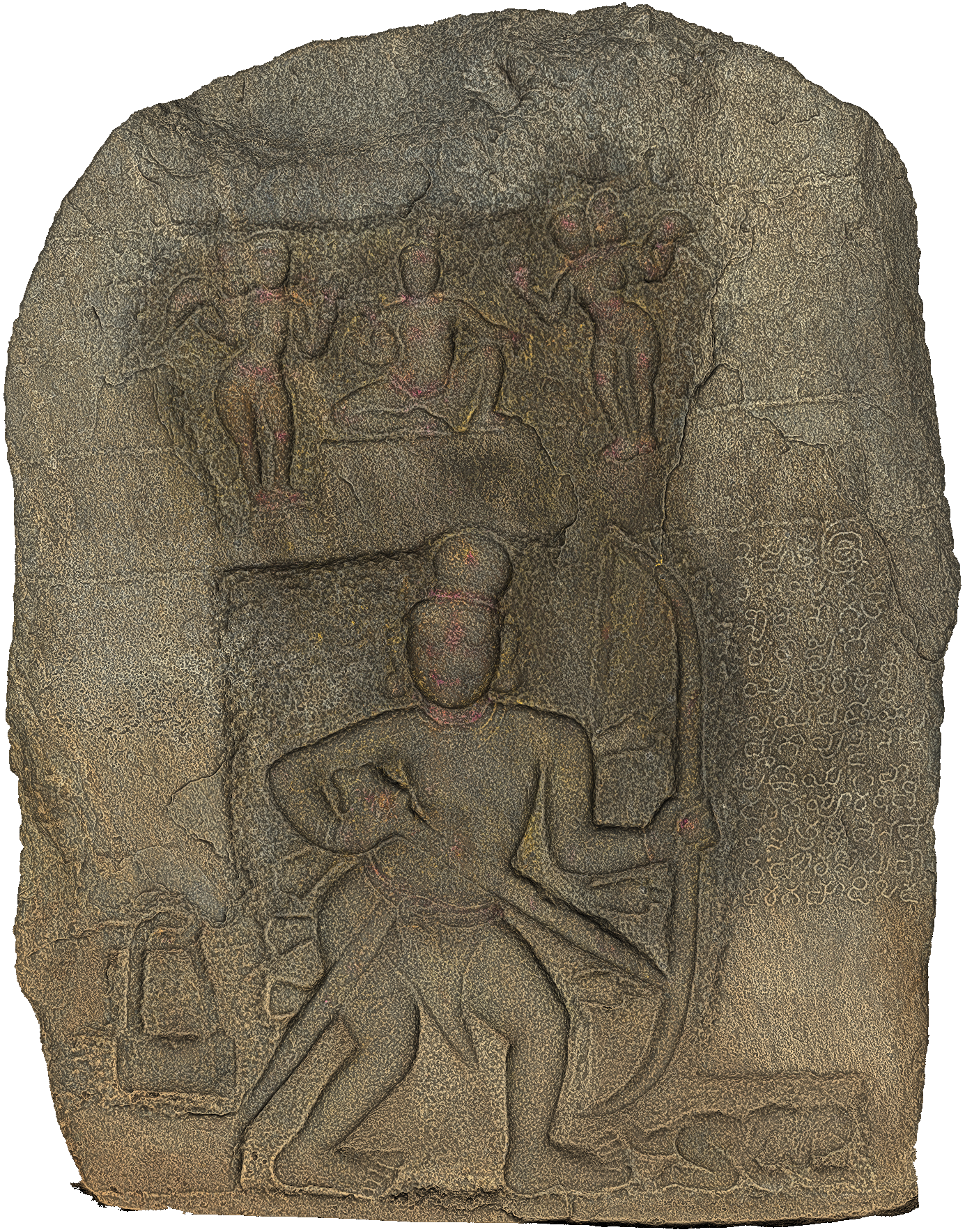
The Kaikondrahalli 900CE Ereyanga Vadaraga Herostone with Inscription

Kaikondrahalli inscriptions and hero stores are relics more than 1,000 years old found in Kaikondrahalli, a locality in Bengaluru, India.

The locality houses a 10th-century (dated paleographically) Herostone with a Kannada Inscription of the Western Gangas. The inscription records the demise of an Erayenga Vadaraga during a raid aimed at destroying his village, Kannili, where he worked as a servant of Ereyamma, the Gavunda of Kannili. This relic was commissioned by Marasingha Vadaraga, son of Erayenga Vadaraga to honor his father's memory.

== Nagattara ==
The herostone was inscribed during the reign of Nagattara, a Western Ganga Chieftain who ruled this region from his administrative seat in Beguru. Nagattara was bestowed the title Kaliyuga Hanumantha as indicated in the inscription, signifying his might like the Hindu god Hanumantha. This inscription makes it evident that Kannili (presently known as Kanneli) constituted an integral part of the Begur administrative division he governed, indicating a documented history of over millennium for this region. The inscription records the term "Gamunda" denoting the position of a village head. It was mentioned in various inscriptions as "Gavunda", "Gavundar" and "Gamundar". Today, the term has evolved into "Gowda", a common surname used by caste communities including Lingayats, Vokkaligas, Kurubas, Halakki Vokkaligas, and Vellalars. The inscription is located in the rear setback Eating Love Building, Sarjapur Road, Kasavanahalli, located to the south of TNT Emerald. The inscription was first published by Adappa Pasodi in the Itihasa Darshana Journal. Nagattara was also responsible for the construction of the Nageshwara Shiva temple, in the Panchalingeshwara temple complex in Begur. The temple is the earliest documented temple of the Bengaluru Region.}

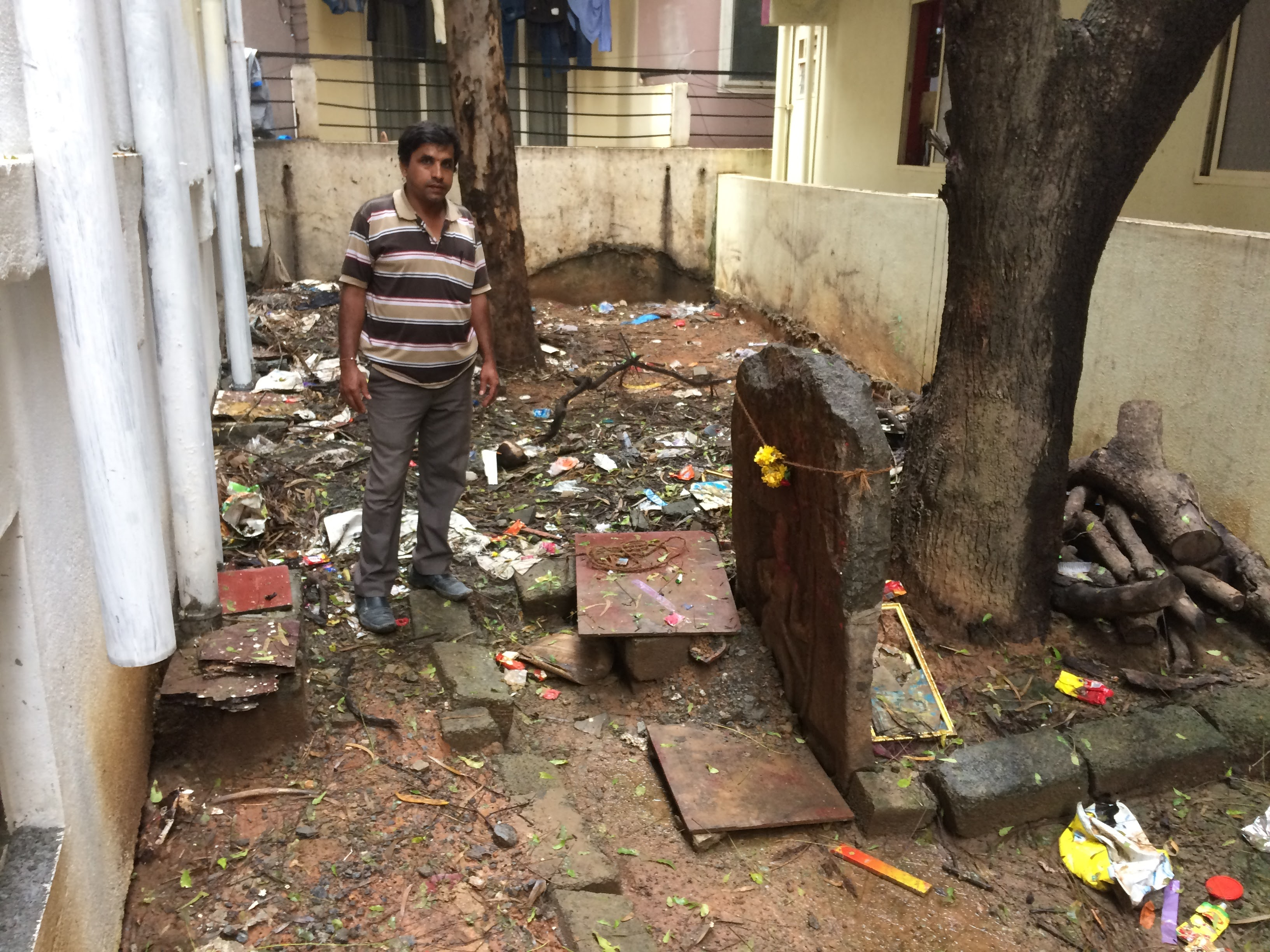
The Kaikondrahalli 900CE Ereyanga Vadaraga Herostone with Inscription

== Physical characteristics ==
The inscription is 127 cm tall, 99 cm wide. The Kannada Characters are approximately 2.4 cm tall, 2.5 cm wide & 0.26 cm deep (very shallow). The stone displays a sizable sculpture of a slightly plump man standing, grasping a bow in one hand and a sword in the other, despite multiple arrows piercing his body. In front of him lies the body of a deceased man. To his right side lies a bag with a long strap and on the panel above, a seated man on a stool is depicted, flanked on each side by apsaras gracefully holding flywhisks (chamara). Adappa Pasodi suggests a unique inference to the small bag in the sculpture as that used to carry betel leaves given by soldiers' wives who would send their husbands off to war with such a basket. The tradition of offering betel leaves to guests continues.

== Transliteration ==
The text below is the rereading published in the Journal of the Mythic Society.

Digital Images of each of the characters of this inscription, images of the inscription itself, summary and the other information about the inscription have been shared via Aksharabhnadara Software.

Line Number	Kannada	IAST
1	. ಸ್ವಸ್ತಿ ಶ್ರೀ	. svasti śrī
2	ಕಲಿಯುಗದ	kaliyugada
3	ಣುವಂ ನಾಗತ್ತ	ṇuvaṃ nāgatta
4	ರಂ ರಾಜ್ಯಂಗೆ	raṃ rājyaṃgĕ
5	ಯ್ಯುತ್ತಿರೆ ಕಣ್ನಿ	yyuttirĕ kaṇni
6	ಲಿಯ ಎಱೆಯ	liya ĕṟĕya
7	ಮ್ಮ ಗಾವುಣ್ಡನಾಳೆ	mma gāvuṇḍanālĕ
8	ಎಱೆಯಂಗ ವಾ	ĕṟĕyaṃga vā
9	ದರಗಂ ಯೂರಳಿವಿ	daragaṃ yūralivi
10	ನಲ್ಸತ್ತಂ ಅವನ ಮ	nalsattaṃ avana ma
11	ಗಂ ಮಾರಸಿಂಘ ವಾ	gaṃ mārasiṃgha vā
12	ದರಗಂ ಮಾಡಿಸಿದಂ	daragaṃ māḍisidaṃ
