= Begur inscriptions and hero stones =

Inscriptions in Bangalore South, India

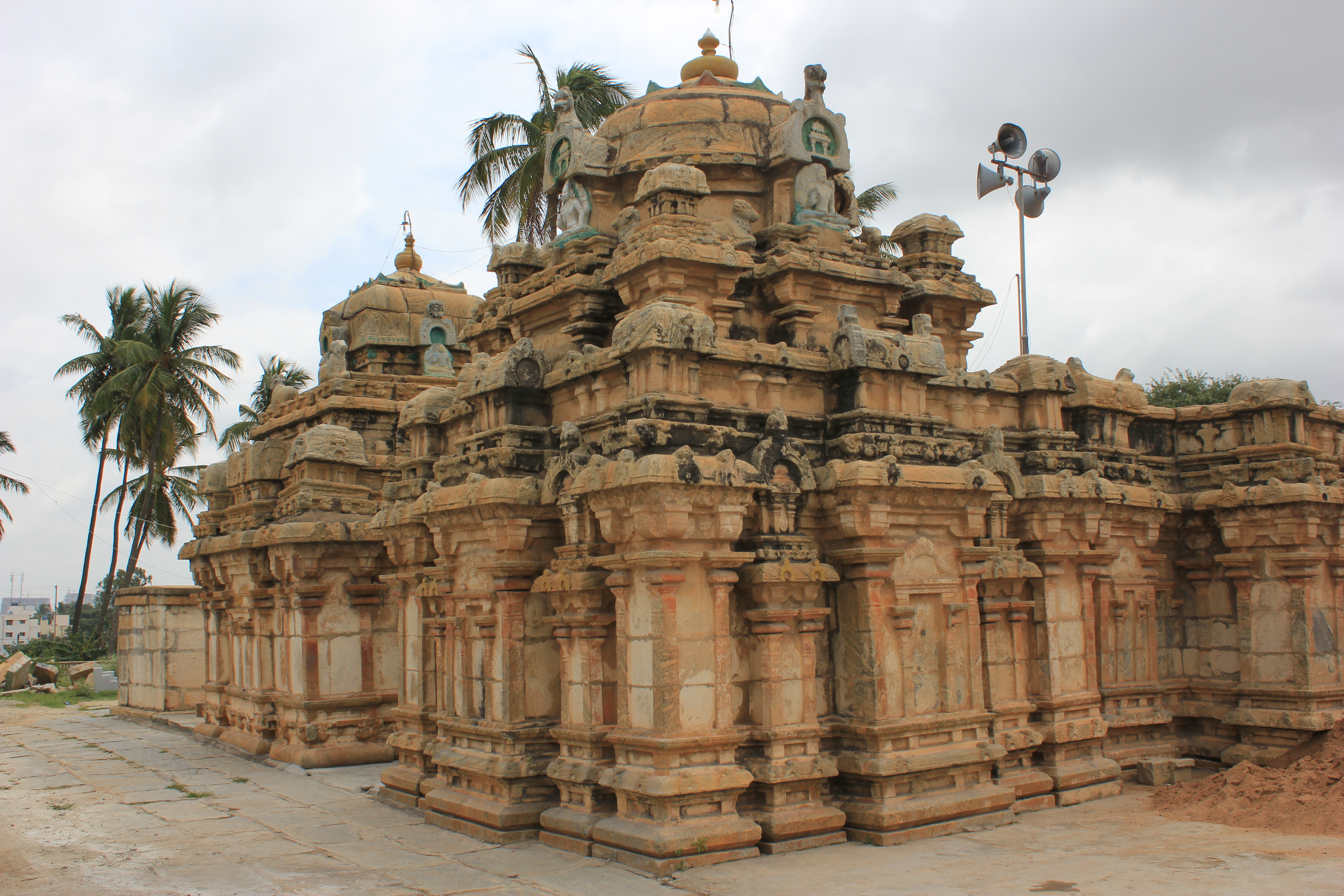
Panchalingeshwara Temple at Begur

The Begur inscriptions and hero stones are significant archaeological and epigraphical artifacts located primarily in Begur, a locality within the Bengaluru South taluk. Spanning a period from the Western Ganga dynasty (c. 6th-10th centuries CE) through the Chola and later periods (up to the 16th century CE), these artifacts are crucial for understanding the early history of Bengaluru. Notably, a 9th/10th-century inscription found here contains the earliest known written reference to "Bengulooru" (Bengaluru), challenging later narratives about the city's founding.

The inscriptions and hero stones, mainly concentrated within the Panchalingeshwara Temple complex (also known as Nageshvara Temple), provide valuable insights into the region's political history, including the rule of the Western Gangas and Cholas, administrative divisions like Bempur-naadu, and local conflicts. They also illuminate diverse religious practices, revealing the co-existence and patronage of both Hinduism (specifically Shaivism) and Jainism, evidenced by temple grants and records of the sallekhana ritual. Furthermore, the artifacts shed light on socio-cultural aspects, such as the veneration of heroes (viragallu), community rituals, and the evolution of the Kannada and Tamil languages in the area. Ongoing conservation efforts, including digital preservation initiatives, aim to safeguard these irreplaceable links to Bengaluru's past.

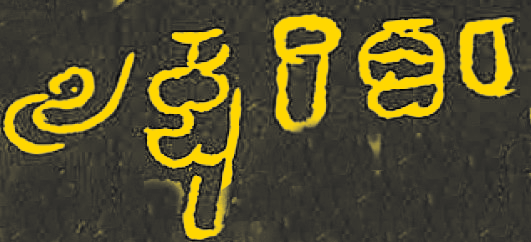
Estampage Highlighting the Place Name 'Bempurishwara' (Begur) in The Mallohalli 517CE Copper Plate Inscription

== Significance ==
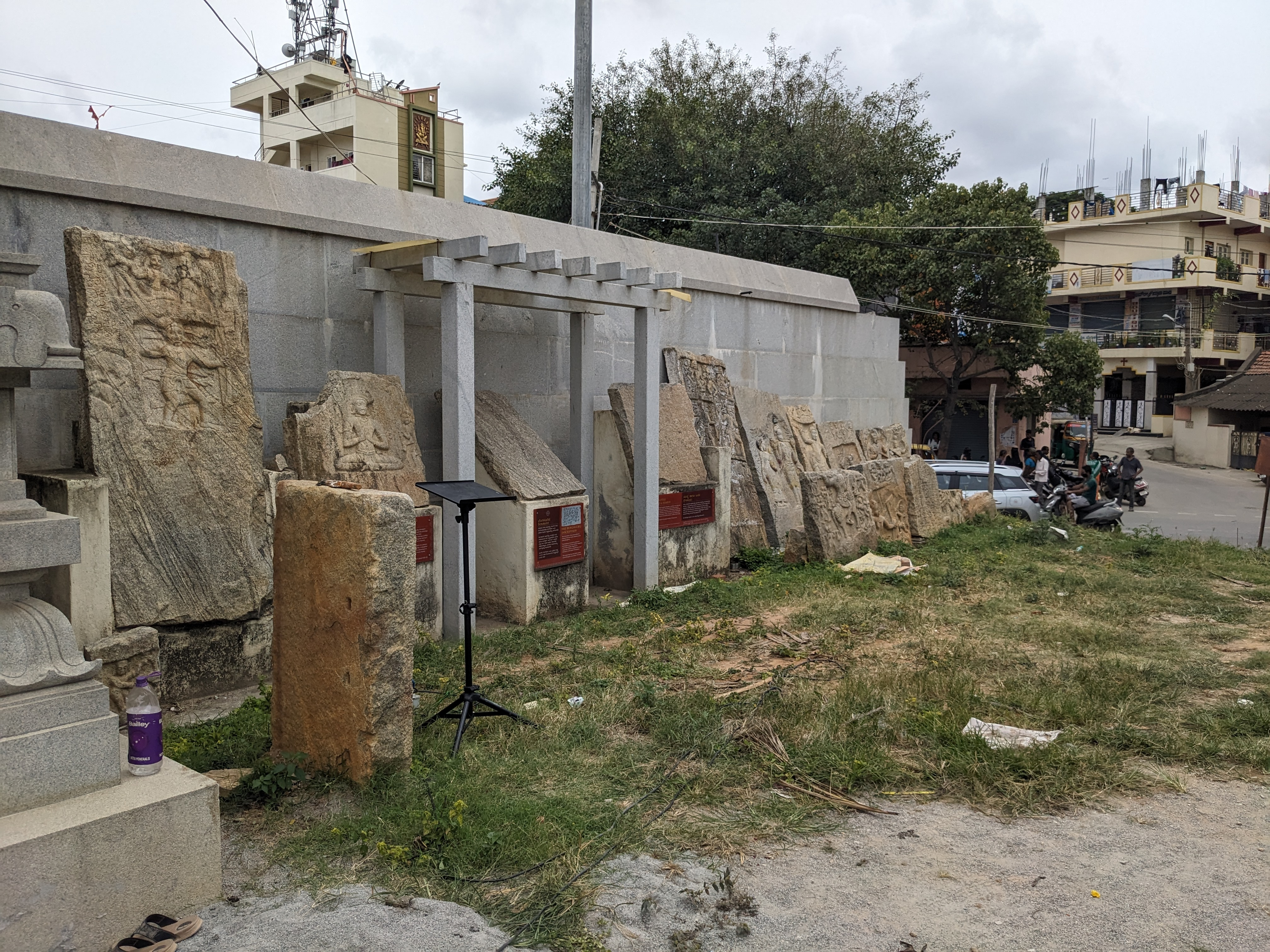
Inscriptions and herostones housed at Begur Nageshwara Temple Complex

The Begur inscriptions and hero stones collectively hold immense significance for reconstructing the history and culture of the Bengaluru region and medieval South India more broadly.

Begur has a long history, known in various periods by names such as Bempur, Veppur, and Behur.^{1} The earliest documented evidence of the settlement comes from a copper plate inscription dated 517 CE, cataloged as Doddaballapur inscription number 68 in Volume 9 of Epigraphia Carnatica. Inscriptions indicate that Begur, often referred to as Bempur-naadu or Begur-naadu, functioned as a significant administrative division (naadu) over several centuries. The existence of a fort and numerous inscriptions and hero stones dating from the 10th to the 16th centuries further underscore its historical importance within the Bengaluru region.

Early history of Bengaluru: The most prominent significance lies in establishing the antiquity of the name "Bengaluru" . The c. 900 CE hero stone mentioning the "Bengaluru battle" provides the earliest known written evidence for the place name, pushing its documented existence back by over 600 years compared to the 16th-century founding attributed to Kempe Gowda I. This finding fundamentally reshapes the understanding of the city's origins.

Political and Administrative History: The inscriptions offer crucial data on the Western Ganga dynasty's administration in the region. They confirm Begur's status as an important administrative center (naadu) within Gangavadi and illuminate the role of powerful local chieftains like Nagatara, who acted as governors, military leaders, and patrons. References to specific Ganga kings (Ereyappa, Satyavakya Permmadi) and documented conflicts (Battle of Tumbepadi, battles against Beeravarma, Viramahendra) provide anchors for political chronology and illustrate interactions with contemporary powers like the Nolambas and possibly the Cholas or Chalukyas. The later Tamil inscriptions reflect the subsequent Chola political dominance.

Religious Landscape: The inscriptions from Begur reveal a strong presence of both Hinduism and Jainism, highlighting the region's diverse religious practices. The construction of the Somanatha temple, now known as the Nageshwara temple, by the chieftain Nagatara in 900 CE reflects the significance of temple building and religious patronage. This temple became the focal point of the Begur Panchalingeshwara temple complex, which later housed several other temples. An inscription from 900CE details the grant of tax revenues and lands to the Somanatha temple, highlighting the economic support provided to religious institutions. The inscription also mentions the practice of kālaṃkaḻci (foot-washing ritual), performed by Nagatara as an act of devotion, and records various donations to temples, indicating the community's active involvement in religious life. The prevalence of Jainism is evident from the inscription mentioning Tondabbe as Nagatara's daughter, who chose the Jain ritual of Sanyasam (voluntary death) for her final moments, and another inscription documenting a donation to the Chokkimayya Jinalaya, a Jaina Basadi. Additionally, hero stones commemorating individuals who died in battles reflect the warrior culture and the importance of valor in the society.

Socio-Cultural Practices: Hero stones (viragallu) are particularly rich sources for understanding societal values and practices. They underscore the high cultural value placed on heroism, martial prowess, and self-sacrifice for the community, whether in large-scale battles (Nagatara hero stone), defending cattle (turugol stones like Bydukura Kerega's), or protecting the village. The detailed sculptural depictions on stones like Nagatara's provide visual information on warfare techniques, weaponry, attire, ornamentation, and status symbols of the period. Inscriptions also record specific rituals like kālaṃkaḻci (foot-washing as part of a grant) and sallekhana, offering glimpses into religious and social customs. These stones provide a unique window into the lives and ideals of individuals, including local leaders and potentially commoners, complementing records focused solely on royalty.

Linguistic evolution: The inscriptions serve as primary data for tracing the development of the Kannada language and script during the c. 9th-15th centuries. The presence of later inscriptions also documents linguistic interaction and the influence of different ruling powers and communities in the region over time.

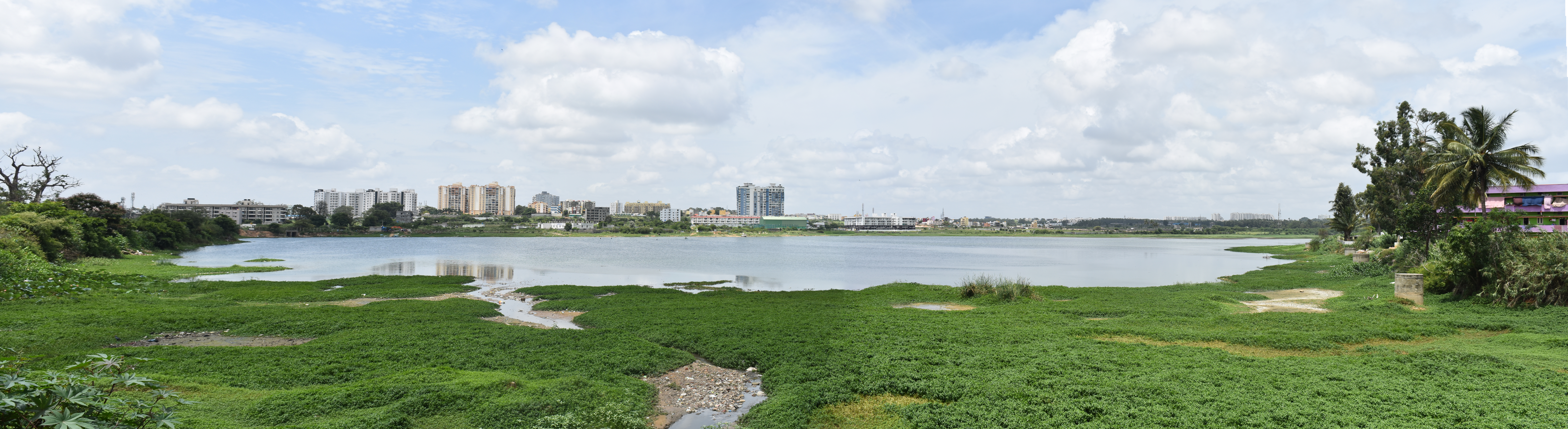
Begur Lake

Urban development: The 900CE inscription mentioning the "Benguluru" battle is the first written record of the city's name, firmly establishing Begur as a crucial location in Bengaluru's early history and pushing back the documented history of the city's name by several centuries. The inscription that mentions twelve villages under the administration of Begur (Bempuru) points to the existence of a network of settlements in the region, indicating an early form of urban organization. These villages, including present-day Begur, Togur, and Hulimangala, offer a glimpse into the spatial extent of Begur's influence in ancient times. Additionally, the mention of specific locations like Tumbepadi (possibly present-day Tumbadi in Tumkur district) and Saraki (still bearing the same name today) provides valuable geographical context and helps in understanding the historical landscape of the region. The reference to "khandugas" of land in an inscription offers insights into the land measurement systems used during that period, contributing to our understanding of administrative practices and economic activities related to land ownership. Furthermore, the Begur lake, referred to as "Veppur Periya Ēri" in a 12th-century Tamil inscription, highlights the importance of water resources in the development of the settlement.

The concentration of numerous inscriptions, hero stones, a major temple complex (Panchalingeshwara), and a fort indicates that Begur was a well-established and significant settlement during the medieval period, functioning as an administrative, religious, and likely economic hub. The epigraphic evidence thus contributes to understanding the patterns of early urban development in the Bengaluru region.

The Begur site contains stone inscriptions and memorial art that provide evidence of political, religious, social, and cultural developments in medieval South India.

== Discovery and dating ==
The discovery and documentation of Begur's inscriptions and hero stones represent a cumulative effort spanning over a century. The initial systematic recording was undertaken by Benjamin Lewis Rice, whose work published in the Epigraphia Carnatica (EC) series, particularly Volume 9 (1905) and its supplements, documented many of the inscriptions first known to scholarship. Rice's pioneering work laid the foundation for subsequent research.

Following Rice, academic fieldwork and scholarly publications continued to uncover and analyze Begur's epigraphs. A notable example is the discovery and publication of the Nagatara temple construction inscription by historian Dr. Devarakonda Reddy in Itihasa Darshana (Volume 3), the journal of the Karnataka Itihasa Academy. Such academic endeavors have refined interpretations and brought previously overlooked inscriptions to light. The "Bengaluru War" inscription, though identified and recorded in 1915, gained wider attention later.

More recently, the "Bengaluru Inscriptions 3D Digital Conservation Project," initiated by The Mythic Society in 2021, represents a modern phase of discovery and documentation. This project uses high-resolution 3D scanning technology not only to preserve existing inscriptions digitally but also to aid in their decipherment and has led to the identification of previously undocumented inscriptions in the broader Bengaluru region. This ongoing process highlights that the study of Begur's epigraphy is dynamic, with new information and interpretations emerging even in the 21st century.

Dating these artifacts relies on several methodologies. For inscribed stones, paleography, the analysis of the script's form and evolution, is a primary tool. J.F. Fleet's detailed analysis of the Kannada characters on the large Nagatara hero stone in Epigraphia Indica Vol. VI provides a classic example, comparing letter forms to establish a relative chronology. Historical context is also crucial; inscriptions are often dated by referencing known rulers (like Ganga king Ereyappa or Satyavakya Permmadi) or specific events (like the "Bengaluru battle") mentioned in the text. Cross-referencing details with other dated inscriptions from the region further aids in establishing timelines.

However, challenges exist. Many hero stones (viragallu) lack inscriptions, making dating more complex. In such cases, dating relies on analyzing the sculptural style, including depictions of clothing, weaponry, ornamentation, and artistic conventions, comparing them to dated examples. Furthermore, the intense urbanization of the Bengaluru region has resulted in many documented inscriptions being lost, damaged, or moved from their original locations, complicating verification and study. The Mythic Society's project attempts to track the current status of these stones, marking them as traceable, lost, or of unknown status on their digital maps. This multi-faceted approach, combining epigraphy, paleography, art history, historical correlation, and modern documentation techniques, is necessary to understand the chronology of the Begur artifacts.

== Begur 900 CE Nagatara's Somanatha Temple construction inscription ==
Begur 900 CE Nagatara's Somanatha Temple Construction Inscription
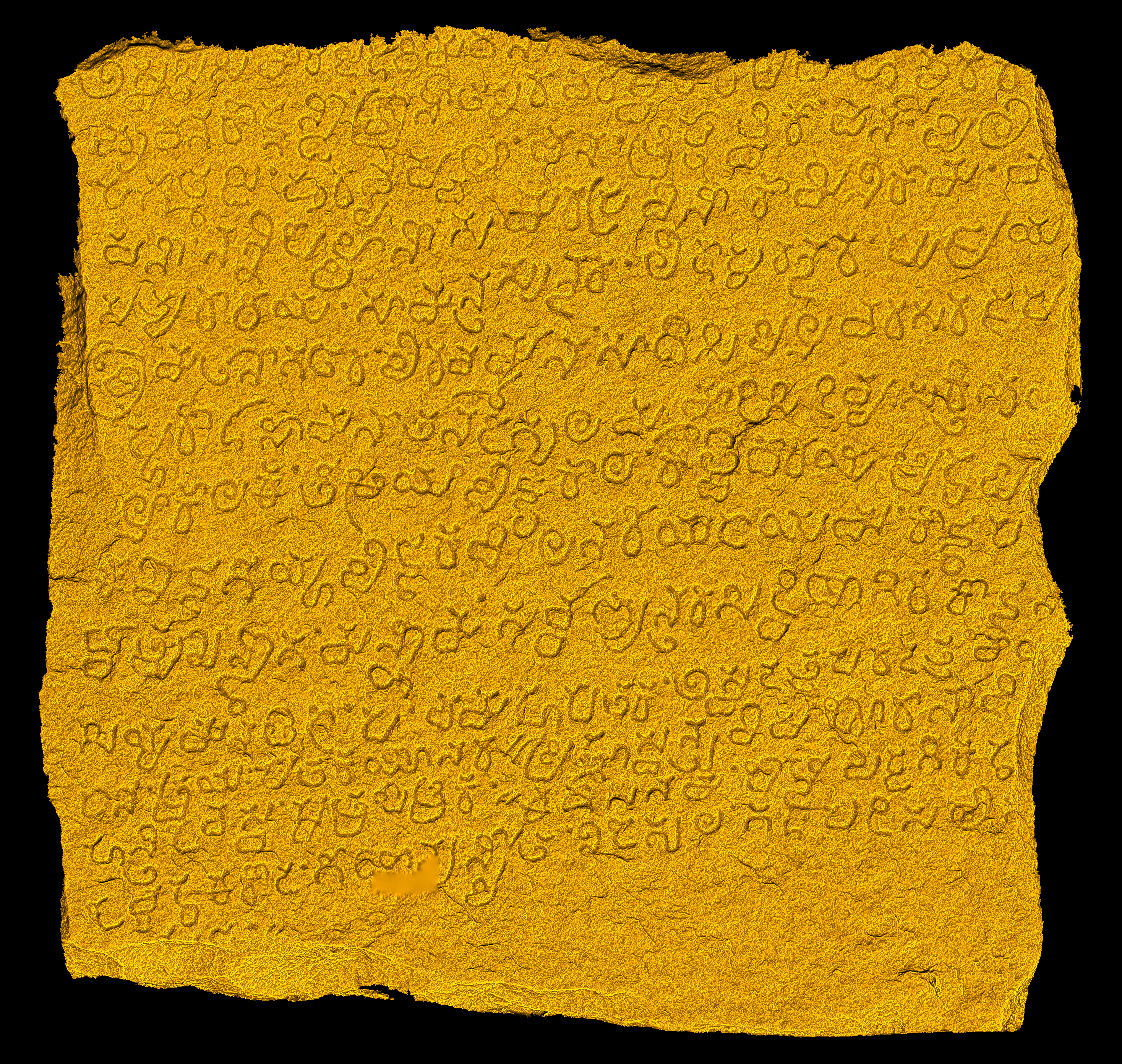
- The Begur 900 CE Nagatara's Somanatha Temple construction inscription
- Material: Stone
- Height: 93 cm (37 in)
- Width: 95 cm (37 in)
- Writing: Kannada script of the time
- Created: 900 (1126 years ago)
- Discovered: 1988
- Discovered by: Dr Devarkonda Reddy
- Present location: 12.876472°N 77.626222°E
- Language: Kannada language of the time

This stone inscription, dated paleographically to the early 10th century CE (c. 900 CE), documents the construction of the Somanatha Temple by the Western Ganga chieftain Nagatara. It provides significant insights into the political, religious, and social context of Begur during the Ganga period.

=== Context of the inscription ===
This period marked the rule of the Western Ganga Dynasty in the region, with Begur, serving as a vital administrative center under a powerful chieftain named Nagatara. He administered Bempur during the reign of the Western Ganga Dynasty in the 10th century CE and is mentioned in at least ten inscriptions found in Begur and other parts of Bengaluru. The inscription also references Satyavakya Permmadi as the reigning Western Ganga ruler during this time, hailing Nagatara as the "Kaliyuga Hanumanta". This title emphasizes Nagatara's strength and prowess as a loyal chieftain serving under the Western Ganga king. Furthermore, Nagatara features prominently in this inscription and is mentioned in several other inscriptions found across Bengaluru, highlighting his significant influence in the region. The fact that he commissioned the construction of the Somanatha Temple

highlights his prominence and likely wealth. The inscription also sheds light on the prevailing religious practices and the significance of temple construction during this era, as the act of building a temple dedicated to Somanatha, a deity associated with Lord Shiva, points toward the prevalence of Shaivism in the region.

=== Summary ===
This inscription records the construction of the Somanatha Temple in Begur by Nagatara. The Somanatha Temple, now known as the Nageshwara Temple, stands within the Begur Panchalingeshvara temple complex. This complex is also home to several other temples, including the Nagareshwara, Choleshvara, Kalikamba, Karneshwara, Parvati, Kali-Kammateshwara, and Suryanarayana temples. These other temples were constructed after the Somanatha Temple. According to the inscription, Nagatara built the Somanatha temple during the 10th century CE to commemorate his triumph over Beeravarma. As a gesture of devotion, he entrusted the temple to a revered Divyasakti Bhatta by performing a ceremonial foot-washing (kālaṃkaḻci) ritual and granting him authority over the temple. The inscription mentions that Nagatara made donations to the temple in the form of tax revenues and lands, referred to as Khandugas, a unit of measurement for area. The specific details of the grant are illegible. It contains various warnings regarding the violation of the grant, along with incentives to safeguard it. This inscription is present in the precincts of the Panchalingeshwara temple complex.

=== Physical characteristics ===
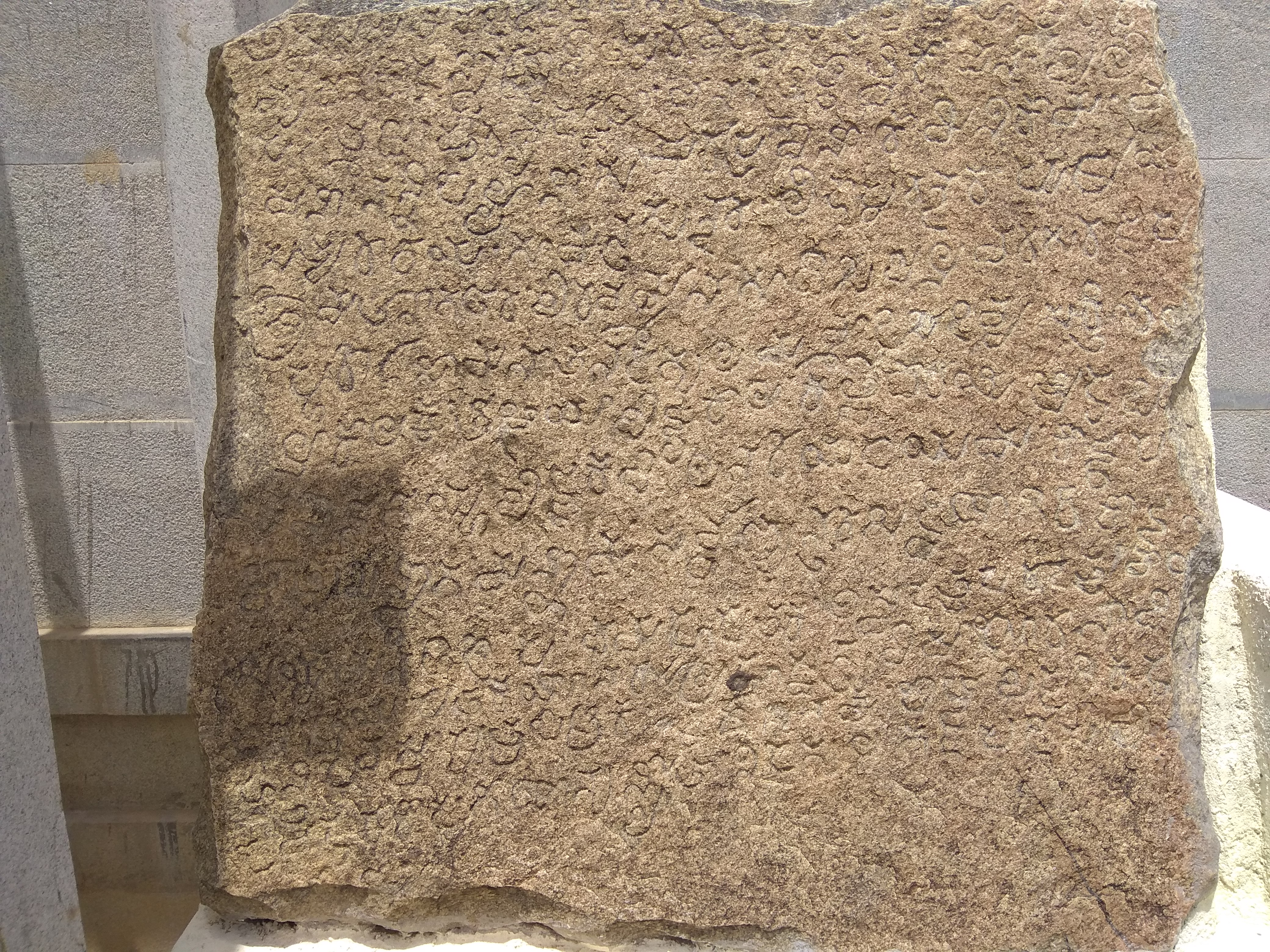
The Begur 900 CE Nagatara's Somanatha Temple construction inscription

The inscription is engraved on a stone slab measuring 93 cm in height and 95 cm in width. The Kannada characters typically measure 3 cm tall, 4 cm wide, and 0.27 cm deep. This inscription was discovered in the mid-90s during clearance work at the temple foundation and subsequently published by historian Dr. Devarakonda Reddy in Itihasa Darshana (Volume 3), the journal of the Karnataka Itihasa Academy.

=== Transliterations of the text ===
The transliteration has been published in Itihasa Darshana (Volume 3). The text below is the recent rereading of the inscription published by Mythic Society.

Line Number	Kannada	IAST
1	಄ ಸ್ವಸ್ತಿ ಸಮರ ಜಳಧಿ ಮಥನ . . . . . . . . . .	಄ svasti samara jal̤a̤dhi mathana . . . . . . . . . .
2	ಭುವನ ಕೊಳ್ಗಣ್ಡಂ ಶ್ರೋಣೀತಪುರವರೇಶ್ವರ . . . . . . . ಶ್ವರ .	bhuvana kŏl̤ga̤ ṇḍaṃ śroṇītapuravareśvara . . . . . . . śvara
3	ಪಗಾತ್ಮಜಂ ಹರ ವೃಷಭ ಲಾಂಚನಂ ತ್ರಿಫ್ತಾತ್ಥಿಕಾಂಚನಂ ಬಲಿ	pagātmajaṃ hara vṛṣabha lāṃcanaṃ triphtātthi kāṃcanaṃ bali
4	ಷಣಂ ನನ್ನಿ ಪೆರ್ಬ್ಬಾಣಂ ಸಮರಪ್ರವೀಣ ಕಾಮಿನೀಕಾಮಂ ಮ .	ṣaṇaṃ nanni pĕrbbāṇaṃ samarapravīṇa kāminīkāmaṃ ma . .
5	ಸತ್ಯರಾಧೆಯಂ ಸಾಮನ್ತಸುನ್ದರಂ ಲೀಳಾಪುರನ್ದರಂ ಘಟೆಯ	satyarādhĕyaṃ sāmantasundaraṃ līl̤āpur ̤ andaraṃ ghaṭĕya
6	ಶ್ರೀಮತ್‌ ನಾಗತರಂ ಬೀರವರ್ಮನಂ ಸಾಧಿಸಿ ಬಲ್ಲವರಸ ರಟ್ಟ ಪ . .	śrīmat nāgataraṃ bīravarmmanaṃ sādhisi ballavarasa raṭṭa pa . .
7	.(ಬೆಂ)ಪೂರೊಳ್‌ ಸೋಮನಾತನ ದೇಗುಲಮಮ್ಮಾಡಿಸಿ ದಿವ್ಯಾಸಕ್ತಿ ಭ .	.(bĕṃ)pūrŏl̤ somanā ̤ tana degulamammāḍisi divyāsakti bha
8	. ಲ್ಲಾ ಕಾಲಕ್ಕಂ ತೆಱೆಯಾ ಬಿಟ್ಟು ಕಾಲಂಕೞ್ಚಿ ಧಾರೆಯೆಱೆದು ಬ . .	llā kālakkaṃ tĕṟĕyā biṭṭu kālaṃkaḻci dhārĕyĕṟĕdu ba .
9	ಕ್ಕೆಞ್ಚಟ್ಟಗೆಯೂ ಬಿಟ್ಟು ಕವಿಲನರೆಯದಾಯಮಂ ಕೊಟ್ಟು ಪ	kkĕñcaṭṭagĕyū biṭṭu kavilanarĕyadāyamaṃ kŏṭṭu pa
10	. ತ್ತು ಖಣ್ಡುಗಂ ಮಣ್ನುಮಂ ಸರ್ವಭ್ಯನ್ತರ ಸಿದ್ಧಿಯಾಗಿರೆ ಕೊಟ್ಟನ್‌ . .	. ttu khaṇḍugaṃ maṇnumaṃ sarvabhyantara siddhiyāgirĕ kŏṭṭan .
11	ಸಿಯುಮನೞಿದೊಂ ಪಂಚಮಹಪಾತಕಂ ಄ ಸ್ವದತ್ತಂ ಪರದತ್ತಂ ವಾ .	siyumanaḻidŏṃ paṃcamahapātakaṃ ಄ svadattaṃ paradattaṃ vā .
12	ದಾನಂ ತ್ರಯಃ ಪತಕ ಯೋ ನರ || ಬ್ರಹ್ಮಸ್ವನ್ತುವಿಷಂ ಘೋರಾನಾದಿ	dānaṃ trayaḥ pataka yo nara || brahmasvantu viṣaṃ ghorānād
13	ಹನ್ತಿ ದೇವಸ್ವಂ ಪುತ್ರ ಪೌತ್ರಿಕಂ || ಈ ಶಾಸನಮಂ ಬಿೞ್ದೆಬಟ್ಟಗಿ ಕಡು	hanti devasvaṃ putra pautrikaṃ || ī śāsanamaṃ biḻdĕbaṭṭagi kaḍu
14	ದೆವುದುಈ ಕೊಡಂಗೆಯ್ವೋನುಣ್ಬಾತಂನೀ ದೇಗುಲಂಗಳಾ ಪಡಿಸಲಿ .	dĕvudu ī kŏḍaṃgĕyvonuṇbātaṃnī degulaṃgal̤ā̤ paḍisali .

== Begur 900 CE Nagatara's herostone with inscription ==
Begur 900 CE Nagatara's Herostone
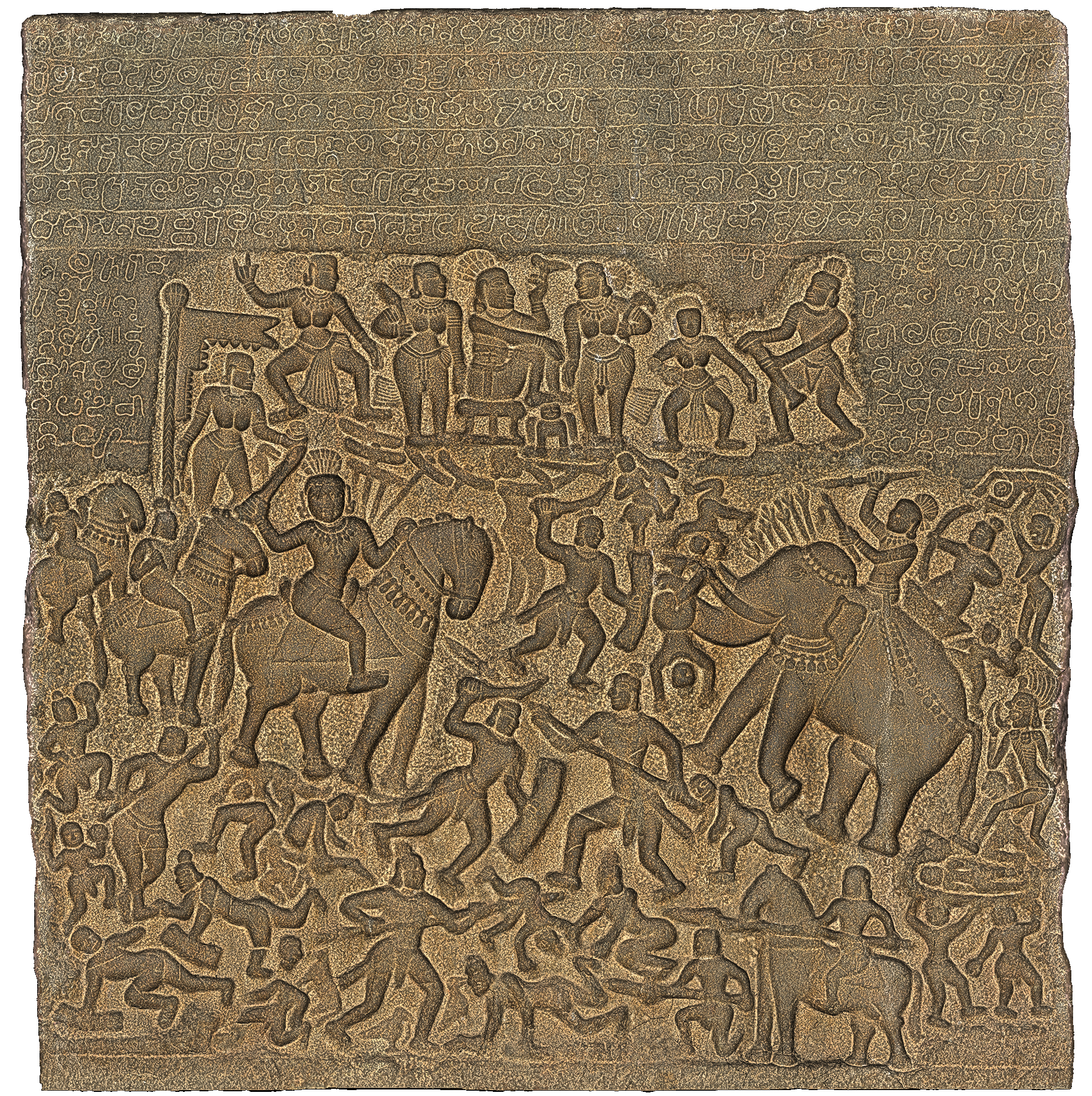
- The Begur 900 CE Nagatara's Somanatha Temple construction inscription
- Material: Stone
- Height: 208 cm (82 in)
- Width: 200 cm (79 in)
- Writing: Kannada script of the time
- Created: 900 (1126 years ago)
- Discovered: 1877
- Discovered by: Probably B L Rice, the then Director of Mysore Archaeology Department
- Present location: 12.974639°N 77.596028°E
- Language: Kannada language of the time

=== Context of the inscription ===
The Western Ganga dynasty ruled parts of present-day Karnataka and Tamil Nadu from the 4th to the 11th centuries CE. They were known for their patronage of the arts, literature, and architecture, and their reign witnessed significant cultural and economic developments in the region. This inscription falls within the later period of Ganga rule, a time marked by increasing pressure from neighboring kingdoms, such as the Rashtrakutas and the Cholas.

The inscription mentions King Ereyappa as the ruler of Gangavadi-96,000, which was a very large administrative unit within the Ganga Kingdom, highlighting the kingdom's extensive reach during this period. Feudatory chieftains like Nagatara played a crucial role in maintaining the Ganga kingdom's power and stability. They were responsible for governing specific territories, collecting taxes, and providing military support to the king.

=== Summary ===
This inscription dates approximately to 900 CE, coinciding with the reign of the Western Ganga Dynasty. It specifically names Ereyappa as the ruler of Gangavadi-96000, a vast administrative division encompassing a significant portion of present-day Karnataka. Under Ereyappa's rule, Nagatara served as a key chieftain, governing Bempur (today's Begur).

This hero stone commemorates Nagatara's bravery and sacrifice. The inscription describes a fierce battle at Tumbepadi, likely present-day Tumbadi in Tumkur district. It recounts that Nagatara fought alongside Aiyyapadeva against Biramahendra. When it became evident that they were going to lose, Nagatara charged into the enemy ranks and was tragically killed by an elephant's peirce, which ultimately led to his demise. Moved by Nagatara's sacrifice, King Ereyappa posthumously honored him by bestowing the title "Nagatara" to Iruga and donated a group of twelve villages in the Bempur region.

This act emphasizes the hierarchical nature of the Ganga administration, where the king ruled over vast territories through loyal chieftains like Nagatara, who governed specific regions. The inscription also records a grant of twelve villages to Iruga, highlighting the king's authority to reward service and ensure continued allegiance. The battle at Tumbepadi suggests a complex interplay of alliances and rivalries among the chieftains under Western Ganga rule, which likely played a significant role in shaping the political landscape of the region. The inscription lists these villages, including Bempuru (today's Begur), Tovaguru (Togur), Puvinapullimangala (Hulimangala), Kutanidunalluru, Nalluru, Komarangundu, Iggaluru, Dugmonelmalli, Galanjavagilu, Saraki, Elkunte, Paravuru, and Kudale (Kudlu). This herostone is currently housed in the Government Museum, Bengaluru.

=== Physical characteristics ===
This herostone with inscription is carved on a stone that measures 208 cm in height and 200 cm in width, with characters typically measuring 5 cm tall, 4 cm wide, and 0.26 cm deep.

=== Transliteration of the text ===
The transliteration has been published by the Epigraphia Carnatica. The text below is the recent rereading of the inscription published by Mythic Society.

Line Number	Kannada	IAST
1	ಸ್ವಸ್ತಿ ಸಮಸ್ತ ಭುವನ ವಿನೂತ ಗಙ್ಗಕುಳ ಗಗನ ನಿರ್ಮ್ಮಳ ತಾರಾಪತಿ ಜಳಧಿ ಜಳವಿಪುಳ ವಳಯಮೇಖಳ ಕಳಾಪಾಳಂ	svasti samasta bhuvana vinūta gaṅgakul̤a ̤ gagana nirmal̤a t ̤ ārāpati jal̤adhi jal̤a̤vipul̤a val̤a̤yamekhal̤a kal̤āpāl̤aṃ
2	ಕ್ರಿತ್ಯೈಳಾಧಿಪತ್ಯ ಲಕ್ಷ್ಮೀಶ್ವಯಂ ವೃತಪತಿತಾಳ್ವಾದ್ಯಗಣಿತ ಗುಣ ಗಣ ವಿಭೂಷಣ ವಿಭೂಷಿತ ವಿಭೂತಿ ಶ್ರೀ ಮದೆಱೆಯಪ್ಪರಸರ್‌	krityail̤ādhipa ̤ tya lakṣmīśvayaṃ vṛtapatitāl̤v̤ādyagaṇita guṇa gaṇa vibhūṣaṇa vibhūṣita vibhūti śrī madĕṟĕyapparasar
3	ಪಗೆವರೆಲ್ಲಮಂನ್ನಿಕ್ಷತ್ರಮ್ಮಾಡಿ ಗಙ್ಗವಾಡಿ ತೊಮ್ಭತ್ತಱುಸಾಸಿರಮುಮನೇಕ ಛತ್ರಚ್ಛಾಯೆಯೊಳಾಳುತ್ತಮಿೞ್ದು ಬೀರಮ	pagĕvarĕllamaṃnnikṣatrammāḍi gaṅgavāḍi tŏmbhattaṟusāsiramumaneka chatracchāyĕyŏl̤ā̤l̤utt̤ amiḻdu bīrama
4	ಹೇನ್ದ್ರನೊಳ್ಕಾದಲೆನ್ದು ಅಯ್ಯಪದೇವಙ್ಗೆಸಾಮನ್ತಸಹಿತಂ ನಾಗತ್ತರನಂ ದಣ್ಡುವೇೞ್ದೊಡೆ ತುಮ್ಬೆಪಾದಿಯೊಳ್ಕಾದಿ ಕಾಳೆಗ ಮಿಮ್ಬ	hendranŏl̤k̤ādalĕndu ayyapadevaṅgĕ sāmantasahitaṃ nāgattaranaṃ daṇḍuveḻdŏḍĕ tumbĕpādiyŏl̤k̤ādi kāl̤ĕg̤ a mimba
5	ೞಿದೊಡೆ ಆನೆಯೊಳಾನ್ತಿಱಿದು ಸತ್ತೊಡದಂ ಕೆಳ್ದೆಱೆಯಪಂ ಮೆಚ್ಚಿ ಇರುಗಙ್ಗೆ ನಾಗತ್ತರವಟ್ಟಂಗಟ್ಟಿ ಬೆಂಪೂರ್ಪ್ಪನ್ನೆರಡು	ḻidŏḍĕ ānĕyŏl̤ān̤ tiṟidu sattŏḍadaṃ kĕl̤dĕṟ ̤ ĕyapaṃ mĕcci irugaṅgĕ nāgattaravaṭṭaṃgaṭṭi bĕṃpūrppannĕraḍu
6	ಮಂ ಶಾಸನಬದ್ಧಂ ಕಲ್ನಾಡಿತ್ತನವಾವುವೆನ್ದೊಡೆ || ಬೆಂಪೂರು|| ತೊವಗೂರು ಪೂವಿನಪುಲ್ಲಿಮಙ್ಗಲ ಕೂತನಿಡುನಲ್ಲೂರು	maṃ śāsanabaddhaṃ kalnāḍittanavāvuvĕndŏḍĕ || bĕṃpūru|| tŏvagūru pūvinapullimaṅgala kūtaniḍunallūru
7	ನಲ್ಲೂರು | ಕೊಮ	nallūru | kŏma
8	ರಂಙ್ಗುನ್ದು || ಇ	raṅgundu || i
9	ಗ್ಗಲೂರು || ದು	ggalūru || du
10	ಗ್ಮೊನೆಲ್ಮಲ್ಲಿ	gmŏnĕlmalli
11	ಗೞಂಜವಾ	gaḻaṃjavā
12	ಗಿಲೂ	gilū
13	ಸಾಱಕಿ	sāṟaki
14	ಎೞ್ಕುಣ್ಟೆ ಪರವೂರು	ĕḻkuṇṭĕ paravūru
15	ಕೂಡಲೆ | ಇನಿತುಮ	kūḍalĕ | inituma
16	ಪೊಲಮೇರೆ ಸಹಿತ	pŏlamerĕ sahita
17	ಮಿತ್ತನೆಱೆಯಪಂ	mittanĕṟĕyapaṃ
18	ಶವುಚರನ್ನಾಗರಂ	śavucarannāgara
19	ಙ್ಗೆ ಮಙ್ಗಳ ಮಹಾಶ್ರೀ	ṅgĕ maṅgal̤a mahāśri

=== Translation ===
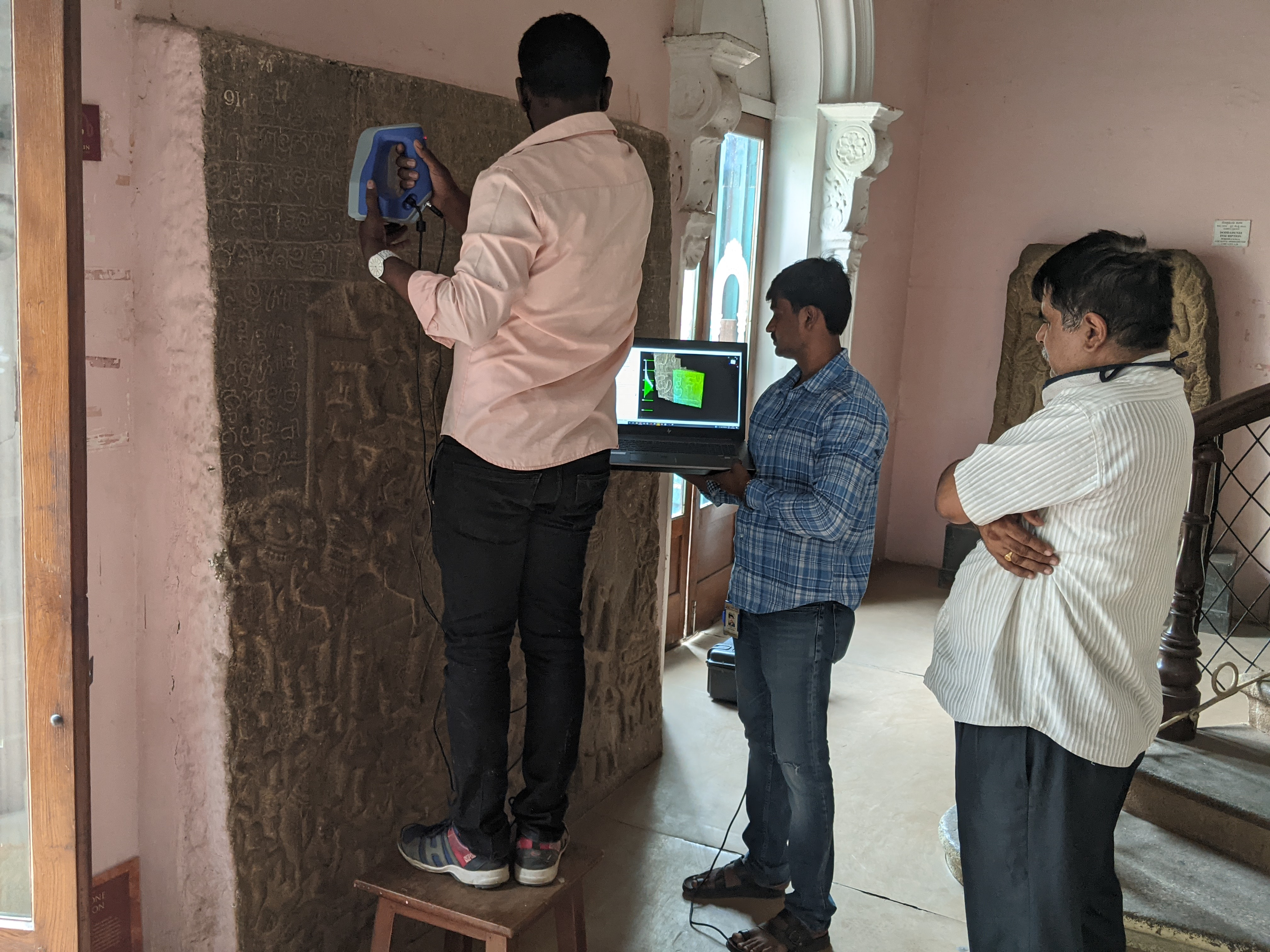
3D scanning of the Begur 900CE Nagatara's herostone with inscription

The translation is published in the Epigraphia Carnatica Volume 9. The text reads as follows,

"Be it well. When, a spotless moon in the sky the Ganga-kula praised in all the world, the self-chosen lord of the Lakshmi of sovereignty over the earth decorated at her waist with a zone of the wide circle of the waters of the ocean, his greatness adorned with the ornament of these and a host of countless virtues, Srimad Ereyaparasa, having made all his enemies powerless, was ruling the Gangavadi Ninety-six Thousand under the shadow of one umbrella, on ordering Nagatara along with his feudatories and the army to Ayyapa-Deva in order to fight against Bira Mahendra, fighting in tumbĕpādi when the battle was losing ground, going close up among the elephants, he slew and died.

Hearing that, Ereyapa was pleased, and binding the Nagattara crown on Iruga, gave him the Bempur Twelve, secured by a sasana, as a kalnāḍ. Those are as follows, bĕṃpūru, tŏvagūru, pūvinapullimaṅgala kūtaniḍunallūru, nallūru, kŏmaraṅgundu, iggalūru, dugmŏnĕlmalli, gaḻaṃjavā, gaḻaṃjavāgilu, sāṟaki, ĕḻkuṇṭĕ, paravūru, kūḍalĕ. Thus much, with the fields anp boundaries, did Ereyapa give for the dutilul Nagatara, maṅgal̤a mahāśri.

== Begur 900 CE Pervvonashetti and Buttanapati's herostone with inscription ==
Begur 900CE Pervvonashetti and Buttanapati's Herostone
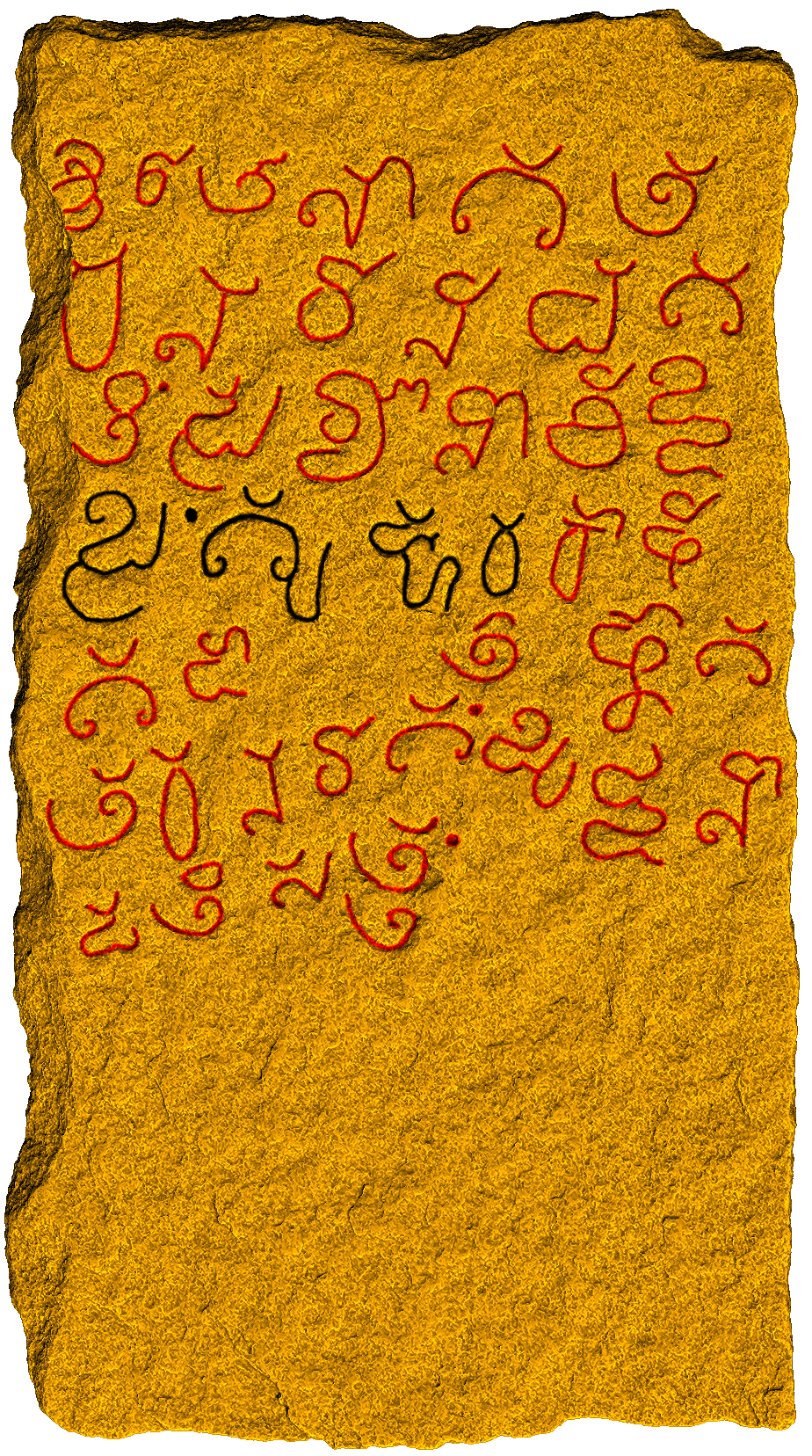
- Digital image obtained by 3D scanning of the Beguru 900CE Pervvonashetti and Buttanapati's herostone with inscription
- Material: Stone
- Size: 442x442px
- Height: 125 cm (49 in)
- Width: 68 cm (27 in)
- Writing: Kannada script of the time
- Created: 900 (1126 years ago)
- Discovered: 1914
- Discovered by: R Narasimhachar, the then Director of Mysore Archaeology Department
- Present location: 12.974639°N 77.596028°E
- Language: Kannada language of the time

=== Context of the inscription ===
This inscription was discovered in 1914 by R Narasimhachar and is a significant piece of evidence for understanding the early history of Bengaluru. This inscription is housed in the Panchalingeshwara temple complex in Begur and is particularly noteworthy for being the earliest known written record of the name 'Bengaluru'. The inscription dates back to 900CE, a period marked by the presence of several powerful dynasties in South India. This Inscription was erected under the rule of the Western Gangas, whose rule was a prominent force in the region, controlling a significant portion of present-day Karnataka.

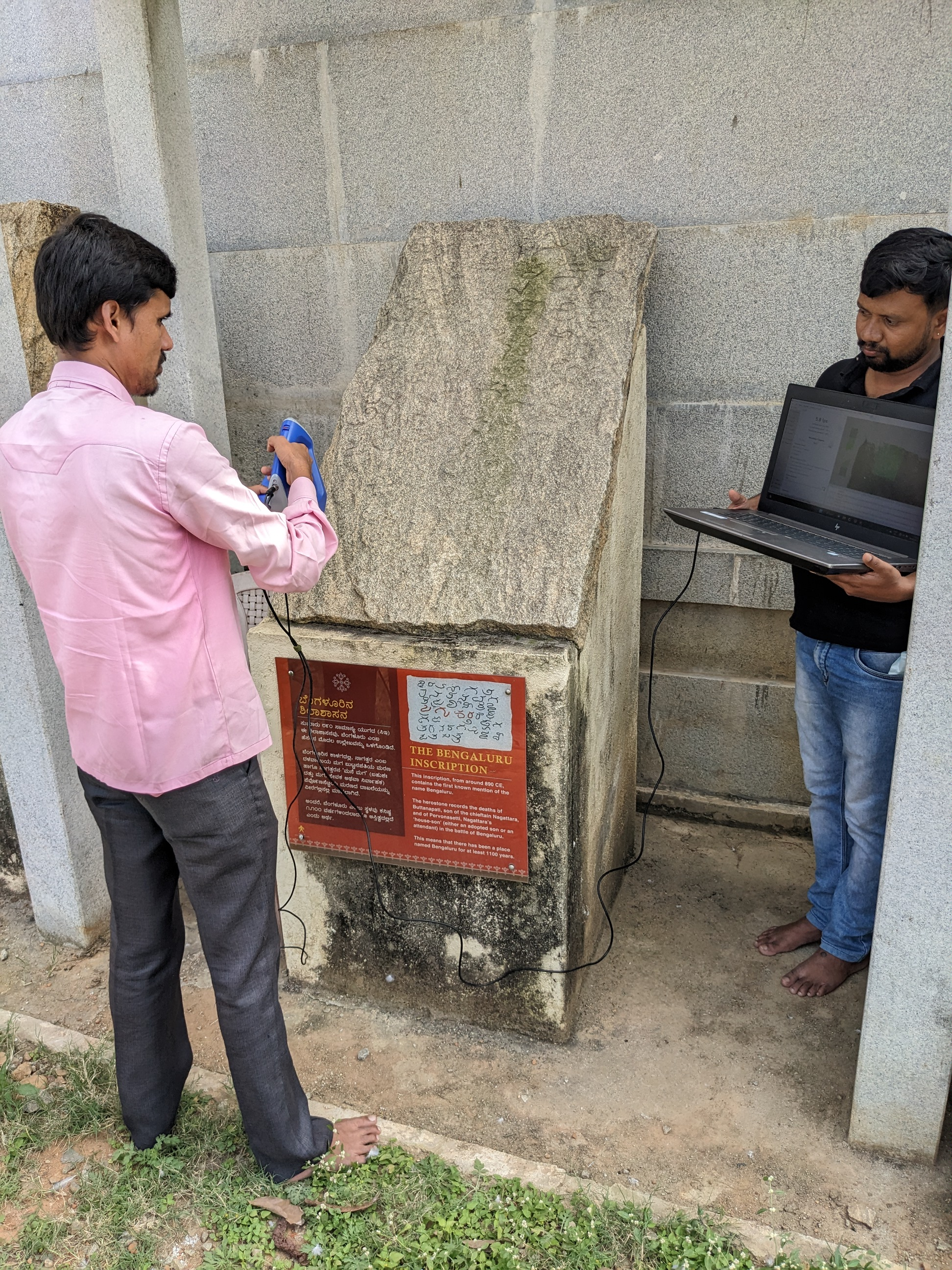
3D Scanning of the Begur 900CE Pervvonashetti and Buttanapati's Herostone with inscription

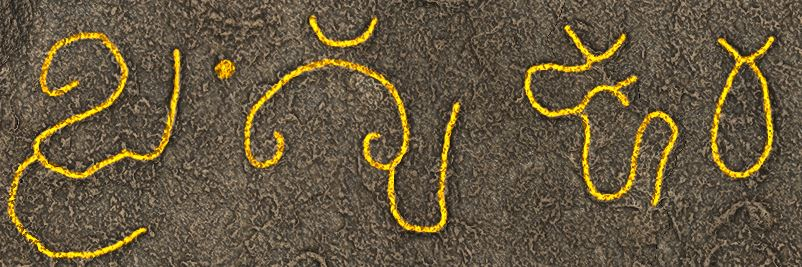
Digital Image of the Word Bengulura (bĕṃgul̤ūra) Obtained by 3D Scanning of The Begur 900 CE Pervvonashetti and Buttanapati's Herostone with Inscription.

The inscription has been the subject of several studies and interpretations by scholars like M.G. Manjunath, S. Karthik, and S.V. Padigar. These scholars have analyzed the inscription's linguistic features and historical context, offering various perspectives on its significance. R Narasimhachar, who discovered the inscription, emphasized its importance in debunking the then-popular story connecting the origin of Bengaluru's name to a Hoysala king, Ballala. The inscription provides a glimpse into the political landscape of the time, mentioning a battle that took place in or around 'Bengaluru.' However, it does not explicitly state whether the battle was fought within Bengaluru itself or over control of the area, leaving this question open for further historical investigation.

=== Summary ===
This inscription was erected in memory of the heroic deaths of Nagatara's sons, Pervvonashetti and Buttanapati, in the battle of "Bengulooru". The inscription mentions the term 'manĕvagati,' which refers to a hereditary servant who serves another's family; this term is used for Pervvonashetti, while 'vagati' is used for Buttanapati, differentiating the biological son from the adopted son. This inscription is published in Epigraphia Carnatica, Volume 9, Supplement, as Bangalore inscription number 174.

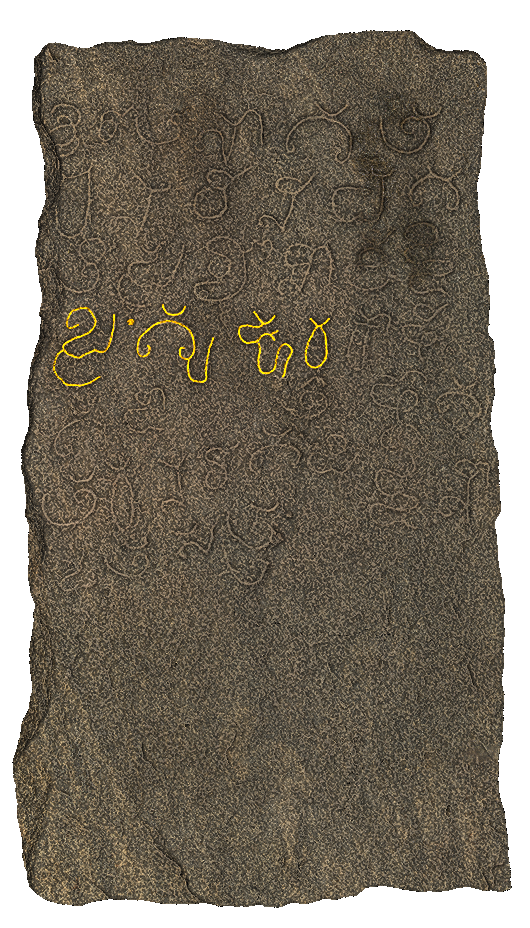
Digital Image Highlighting the Place Name 'Bĕṃgul̤ūra' in the Begur 900CE Pervvonashetti & Buttanapati's Herostone With Inscription.

=== Preservation and recognition ===
These inscriptions, along with others, were in a neglected condition within the temple precinct until 2018, promoting INTACH Bengaluru taking action by installing a protective glass gazebo on the southern side of the temple. The historical significance of this inscription was commemorated during the Lalbagh Republic Day flower show in 2023. It is currently housed in the Panchalingeshwara temple complex.

=== Physical characteristics ===
This herostone with inscription is carved on a stone that measures 125 cm in height and 68 cm in width, with characters typically measuring 7.6 cm tall, 7.4 cm wide, and 0.27 cm deep.

=== Transliteration of the text ===
The transliteration has been published by the Epigraphia Carnatica. The text below is the recent rereading of the inscription published by the Mythic Society.

Digital images of each of the characters of this inscription, images of the inscription itself, summary and the other information about the inscription have been shared via Akshara Bhandara software.

Line Number	Kannada	IAST
1	ಶ್ರೀಮತ್‌ ನಾಗತ	śrīmat nāgata
2	ರನ ಮನೆವಗ	rana manĕvaga
3	ತಿಂ ಪೆರ್ವ್ವೊಣಶೆಟ್ಟಿ	tiṃ pĕrvvŏṇaśĕṭṭ
4	ಬೆಂಗುಳೂರ ಕಾಳೆ	bĕṃgul̤ūr a kāl̤ĕ
5	ಗದೊ. ತಾ . ಳ್ನಾಗ	gadŏ. tā . l̤nāg ̤ a
6	ತರನ ಮಗಂ ಬುಟ್ಟಣ	tarana magaṃ buṭṭaṇa
7	ಪತಿ ಸತ್ತಂ	pati sattaṃ

== Begur 900 CE Tondabbe Sanyasana inscription ==
Begur 900 CE Tondabbe Sanyasana Inscription
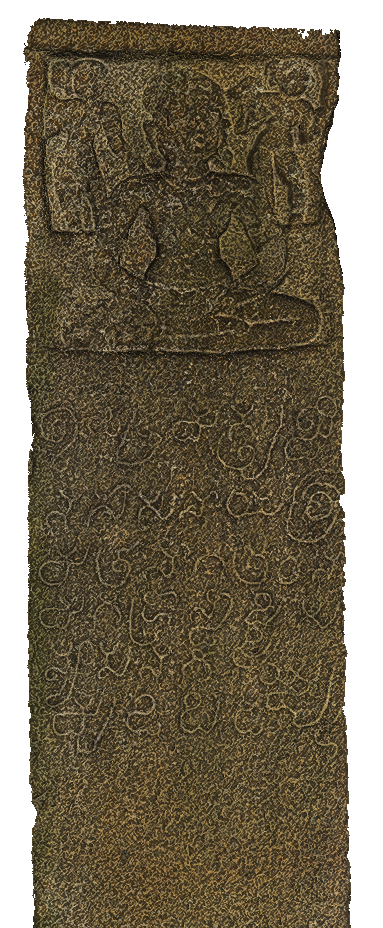
- . Begur 900 CE Tondabbe Sanyasana Inscription
- Material: Stone
- Height: 148 cm (58 in)
- Width: 38 cm (15 in)
- Writing: Kannada script of the time
- Created: 900 (1126 years ago)
- Discovered: 1905
- Discovered by: B L Rice (Director of Mysore Archaeology Department) and team
- Present location: 12.8710993°N 77.6231483°E
- Language: Kannada language of the time
- https://mythicsociety.github.io/AksharaBhandara/#/learn/Shasanagalu?id=108900

=== Context of the inscription ===
This inscription is erected on the mantapa pillar located at the entrance of the Begur fort. It is one of the very few inscriptions documented in Bengaluru which belongs to the Jaina religion. The inscription's reference to Tondabbe's death through Sanyasana suggests a strong Jain presence in Begur during the 10th century CE.

In Jain philosophy, Sanyasana is a significant path toward liberation from the cycle of birth and death. It involves a voluntary and rigorous renunciation of worldly possessions and attachments. In some cases, Sanyasana can involve a specific ritualistic death known as "Sanyasana-marana," which entails a gradual reduction of food intake leading to self-starvation.

Jainism categorizes 48 types of death into three groups: bāla-maraṇa (childish or foolish death), paṇḍita-maraṇa (wise death), and paṇḍita-paṇḍitamaraṇa (the wisest of wise death). Sanyasana-marana is considered to fall under the paṇḍita-paṇḍitamaraṇa category, offering complete liberation from all bonds, including rebirth.

=== Summary ===
This inscription records that Tondabbe, daughter of Nagatara, died through the ritual of Sanyasana.The inscription begins with the symbol ಄, representing "siddham," signifying the achievement of success. The inscription includes the phrase "bhadramastu jina sasanaya," meaning "prosperity to the Jain inscription," a common Sanskrit invocation found in Jain inscriptions. The inscription is estimated to date back to around 900 CE based on the style of its characters. The inscription has been documented in the Epigraphia Carnatica Vol 9 as Bengaluru Inscription Number 94.

A sculpture of a woman seated in the meditative padmasana posture is carved on the pillar just above the inscription. On either side of her shoulders are two smaller figures of women, apparently serving as attendants.

=== Physical characteristics ===
This herostone with inscription is carved on a stone that measures 148 cm in height and 38 cm in width, with characters typically measuring 4 cm tall, 7.4 cm wide, and 0.21 cm deep.

=== Transliteration of the text ===
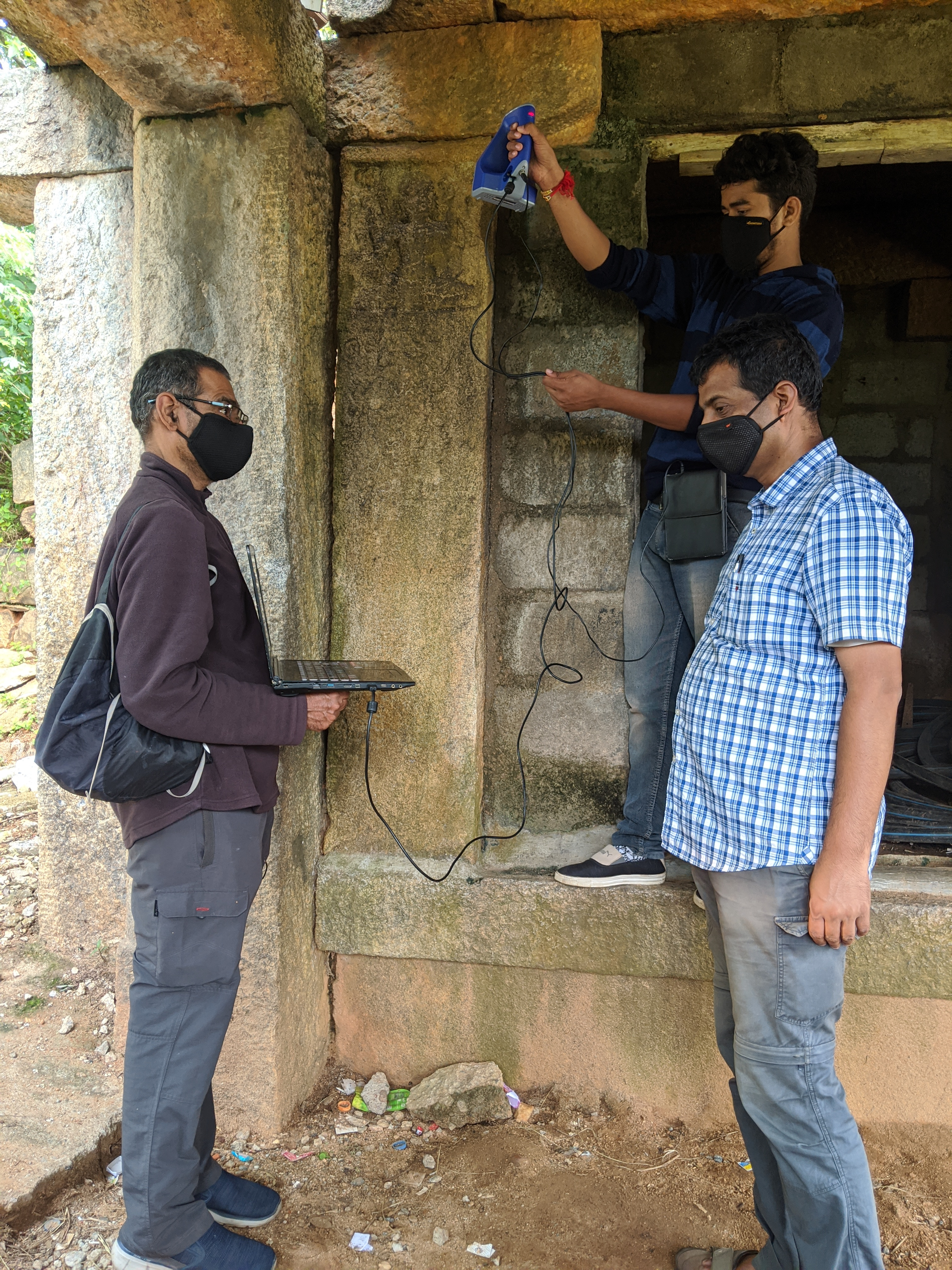
3D scanning of the Begur 900CE Tondabbe Sanyasana inscription

The transliteration has been published by the Epigraphia Carnatica. The text below is the recent rereading of the inscription published by Mythic Society.

Digital images of each of the characters of this inscription, images of the inscription itself, summary and the other information about the inscription have been shared via Akshara Bhandara software.

Line Number	Kannada	IAST
1	಄ ಭದ್ರಮಸ್ತು ಜಿ	಄ bhadramastu ji
2	ನ ಸಾಸನಾಯ ಶ್ರೀ	na sāsanāya śrī
3	ಮತ್ ನಾಗತರನ	mat nāgatarana
4	ಮಗಳ್ತೊಣ್ಡಬ್ಬೆ ಸ	magal̤tŏ̤ṇḍabbĕ sa
5	ನ್ಯಾಸನಂಗೆಯ್ದು	nyāsanaṃgĕydu
6	ಮುಡಿಪಿದಳ್	muḍipidal̤

=== Translation ===
The translation of the text is published in Epigraphia Carnatica. The text is as follows,

"Nagatara's daughter Tondabbe, ending her time in the manner appointed, died."

== Begur 900CE Tondabbe's husband's herostone with inscription ==
Begur 900CE Tondabbe's Husband's Herostone With Inscription
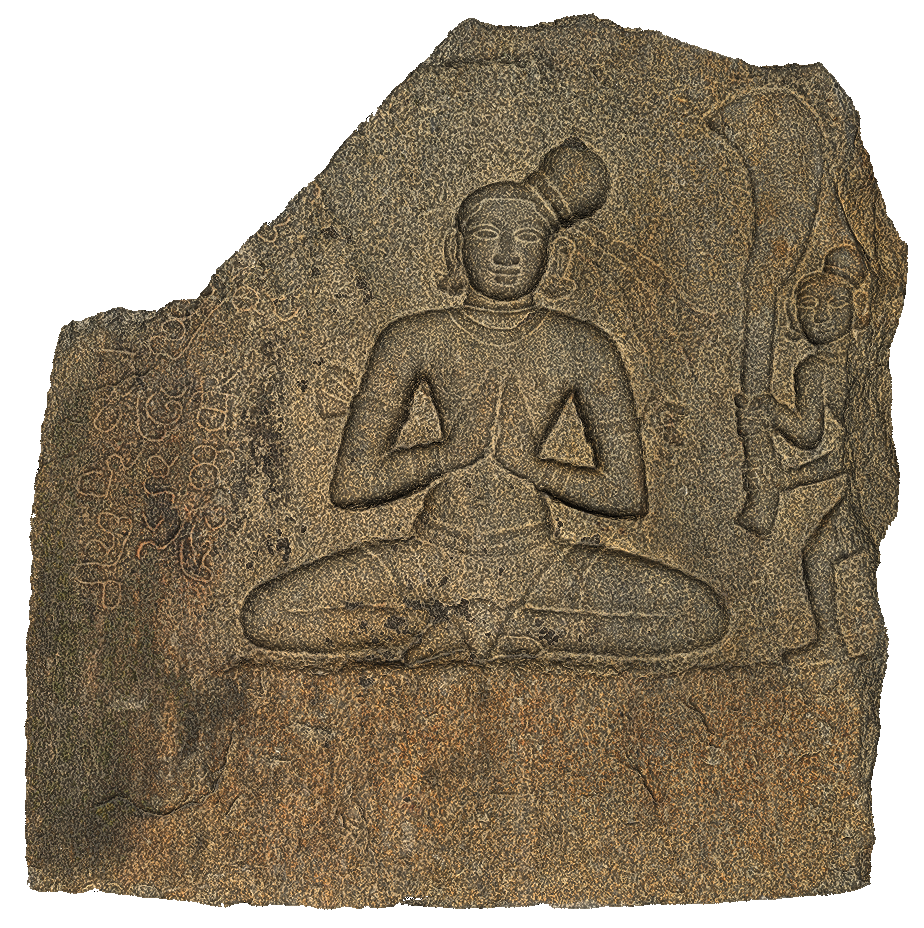
- The Begur 900CE Tondabbe's Husband's Herostone with inscription
- Material: Stone
- Height: 95 cm (37 in)
- Width: 91 cm (36 in)
- Writing: Kannada script of the time
- Created: 900 (1126 years ago)
- Discovered: 1905
- Discovered by: B L Rice (Director of Mysore Archaeology Department) and team
- Present location: 12.876815°N 77.626444°E
- Language: Kannada language of the time
- https://mythicsociety.github.io/AksharaBhandara/#/learn/Shasanagalu?id=105900

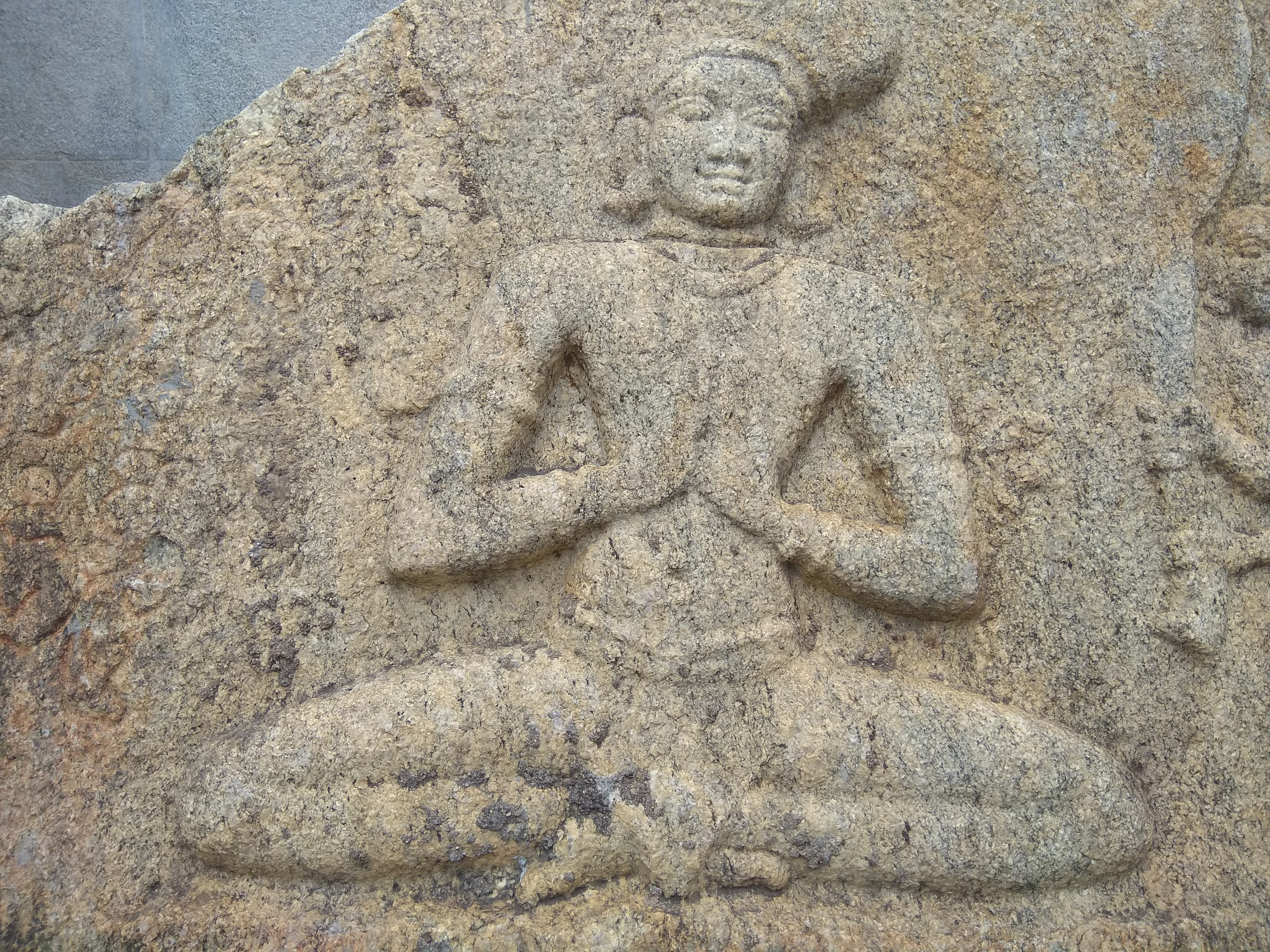
Begur 900CE Tondabbe's Husband's Herostone with inscription

=== Context of the inscription ===
This hero stone is located within the Panchalingeshwara temple complex. The herostone is considered unusual due to the fragmented nature of the inscription, as the existing portion contains only a few concluding lines. This has led to speculation that additional lines may have been present when the stone was originally installed but have since been lost. The Epigraphia Carnatica provides portions of these missing initial lines, aiding in forming a summary. Interestingly, the inscription references a female figure, which seems inconsistent with the sculpture of a seated male. This discrepancy suggests that additional text could have once explained this figure further.

=== Summary ===
This hero stone depicts a scene of self-sacrifice, featuring a calmly seated male with a large cut on the neck, indicating severing, while another figure stands alongside, holding a large, heavy sword-like device intended to behead the hero. Combining the imagery on the hero stone with the text from Epigraphia Carnatica, Vol. 9, it can be inferred that the hero was the husband of Tondabbe, Nagatara's daughter. The violent portrayal of the man's death implies that he was not a follower of Jainism, while his wife, Tondabbe, adhered to the Jain faith.

=== Physical characteristics ===
This herostone with inscription is carved on a stone that measures 95 cm in height and 91 cm in width, with characters typically measuring 4 cm tall, 3 cm wide, and 0.24 cm deep.

=== Transliteration of the text ===
The transliteration in both Kannada and IAST has been published in Epigraphia Carnatica; however, in the Mythic Society's recent re-reading, only the last three lines have been fully documented, as the inscription is damaged. The text in the table has been taken from both Epigraphia Carnatica and the Mythic Society's re-reading.

Digital images of each of the characters of this inscription, images of the inscription itself, summary and the other information about the inscription have been shared via Akshara Bhandara software.

Line Number	Kannada	IAST
1	ನಾಗತ್ತರನ	nāgattarana
2	ಮಗಳ್ಕೊ	magal̤k̤ŏ
3	ಣ್ಡಬ್ಬೆಯು	ṇḍabbĕyu
4	ಕತ್ತವ್ಯ	kattavya
5	ವೇಳೆಗೊ	vĕl̤ĕg̤ŏ
6	ಣ್ಡು ಸತ್ತಂ	ṇḍu sattaṃ

== Begur 900CE Bydukura Kerega Turugol and Uralivu herostone ==
Begur 900CE Bydukura Kerega Turugol and Uralivu Herostone
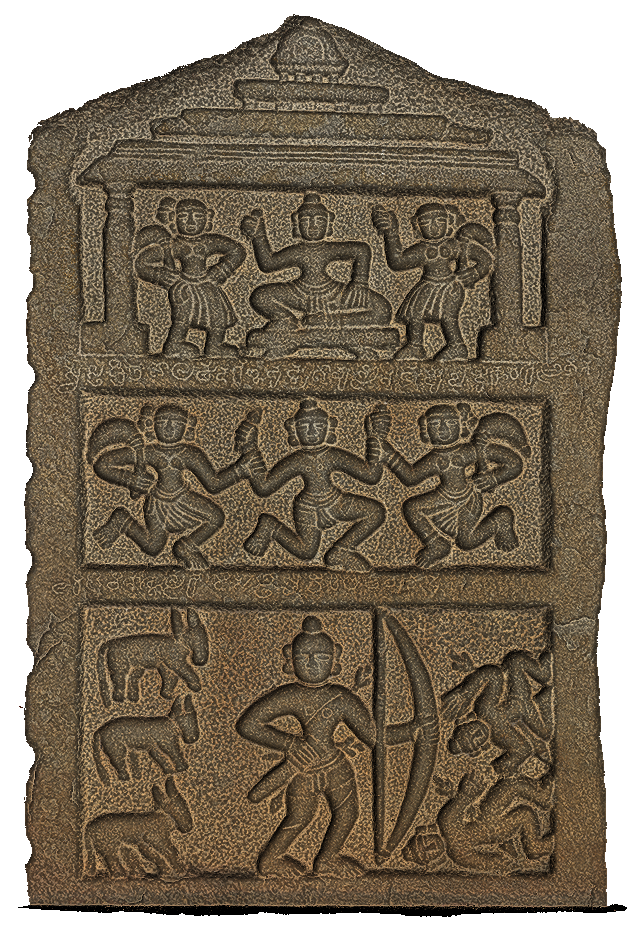
- Dhe Begur 900CE Bydukura Kerega Turugol and Uralivu Herostone Inscription Picture
- Material: Stone
- Height: 212 cm (83 in)
- Width: 139 cm (55 in)
- Writing: Kannada script of the time
- Created: 900 (1126 years ago)
- Discovered: 1905
- Discovered by: B L Rice (Director of Mysore Archaeology Department) and team
- Present location: 12.876815°N 77.626444°E
- Language: Kannada language of the time
- https://mythicsociety.github.io/AksharaBhandara/#/learn/Shasanagalu?id=115146

=== Context of the inscription ===
This hero stone sheds light on the two key concepts of Turugol and Uralivu.

Turugol refers to cattle raiding, reflecting the significant economic and cultural value of cattle as a primary source of wealth. Raiding parties often targeted villages to steal cattle. The Bydukura Kerega inscription, though primarily focused on uralivu (the destruction or ravaging of a town), suggests that Bydukura Kerega may have defended the town against raiders whose aims were not only to steal cattle but also to cause widespread harm.

=== Summary ===
This hero-stone commemorates Bydukura Kerega's valiant death while defending a village from destruction and protecting the cattles. The inscription, though somewhat cryptic, suggest that Bydukura Kerega was the brother-in-law of a Tengalamadaka Gamunda. This inscription has been documented in Epigraphia Carnatica, Vol. 9. The re-reading of the inscription has been published by the Mythic Society. Currently, this hero stone is housed in the Government Museum, Bengaluru.

The Herostone is intricately divided into three sections, each depicting a different scene related to the hero's demise and afterlife. Starting from the bottom section, a battle scene is carved, showcasing the hero standing tall with a bow in one hand and a large sword in the other. His posture clearly indicates that he is either engaged in a fierce fight or poised to confront a formidable opponent. Tragically, his body is depicted as being pierced by two arrows. In front of him lie the lifeless bodies of two men, stacked one atop the other. Behind the hero, three small cow sculptures add context to the scene.

The middle section depicts the hero rising towards heaven. Beside him, apsaras hold his hands, guiding him on his journey. The topmost portion features the hero seated on a stool within a canopied structure, being attended by apsaras who hold chamaras (flywhisks), symbols of honor and reverence. These three scenes are separated by a thick, rib-like horizontal section, upon which an inscription is carved. This three-part representation of heroic fighting is a common theme found in many hero stones.

=== Physical characteristics ===
This herostone with inscription is carved on a stone that measures 212 cm in height and 139 cm in width, with characters typically measuring 4 cm tall, 5 cm wide, and 0.18 cm deep.

=== Transliteration of the text ===
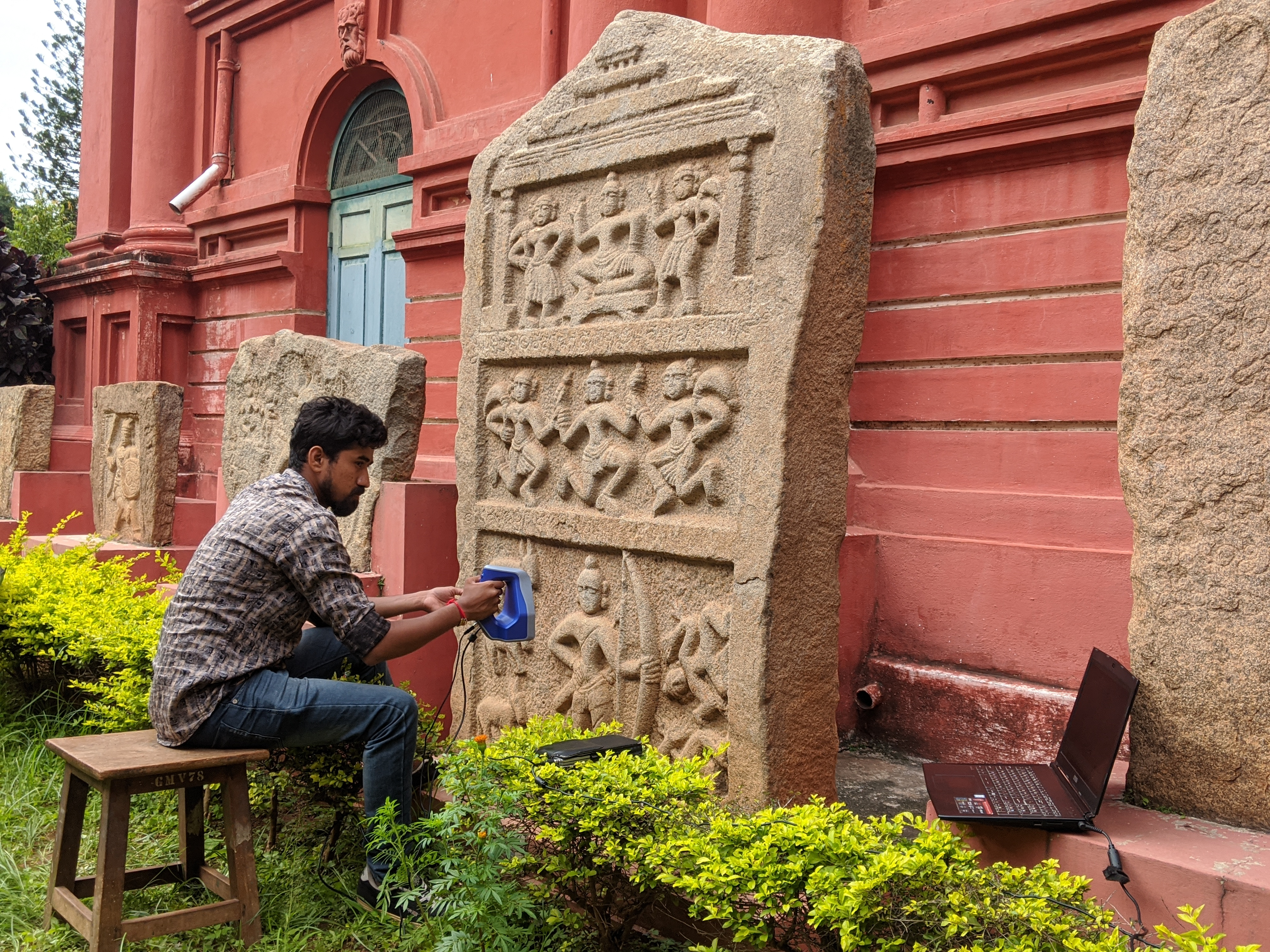
3D scanning of the Begur 900CE Bydukura Kerega Turugol and Uralivu Herostone inscription

This transliteration has been documented in Epigraphia Carnatica Vol 9. The text below is the Mythic Society's rereading.

Digital images of each of the characters of this inscription, images of the inscription itself, summary and the other information about the inscription have been shared via Akshara Bhandara software.

Line Number	Kannada	IAST
1	ಸ್ವಸ್ತಿಶ್ರೀ ತೆಂಗಾಲಮದಕಇದು . ಗಾಮುಣ್ಡನ ಮಯ್ದುಂ ಬಯ್ದುಕೂರ ಕೆಱೆಗನ	svastiśrī tĕṃgālamadakaïdu . gāmuṇḍana mayduṃ baydukūra kĕṟĕgana
2	ಊರಾೞಿವಿನೊಳ್ಗೆಲೆ ಕಾದಿ ಸತ್ತ ಆ . . . . . . ಳ	ūrāḻivinŏl̤g̤ĕlĕ kādi satta ā . . . . . . l̤a

== Begur 1400CE Nagareshwara Temple Gowdu Sonnappa ==
Begur 1400CE Nagareshwara Temple Gowdu Sonnappa
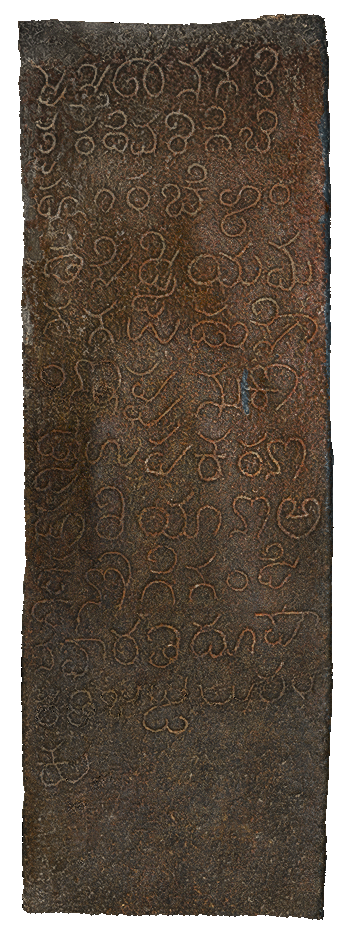
- . Begur 1400CE Nagareshwara Temple Gowdu Sonnappa
- Material: Stone
- Height: 77 cm (30 in)
- Width: 30 cm (12 in)
- Writing: Kannada script of the time
- Created: 900 (1126 years ago)
- Discovered: 1905
- Discovered by: B L Rice (Director of Mysore Archaeology Department) and team
- Present location: 12.876815°N 77.626444°E
- Language: Kannada language of the time
- https://mythicsociety.github.io/AksharaBhandara/#/learn/Shasanagalu?id=1011400

=== Context of the inscription ===
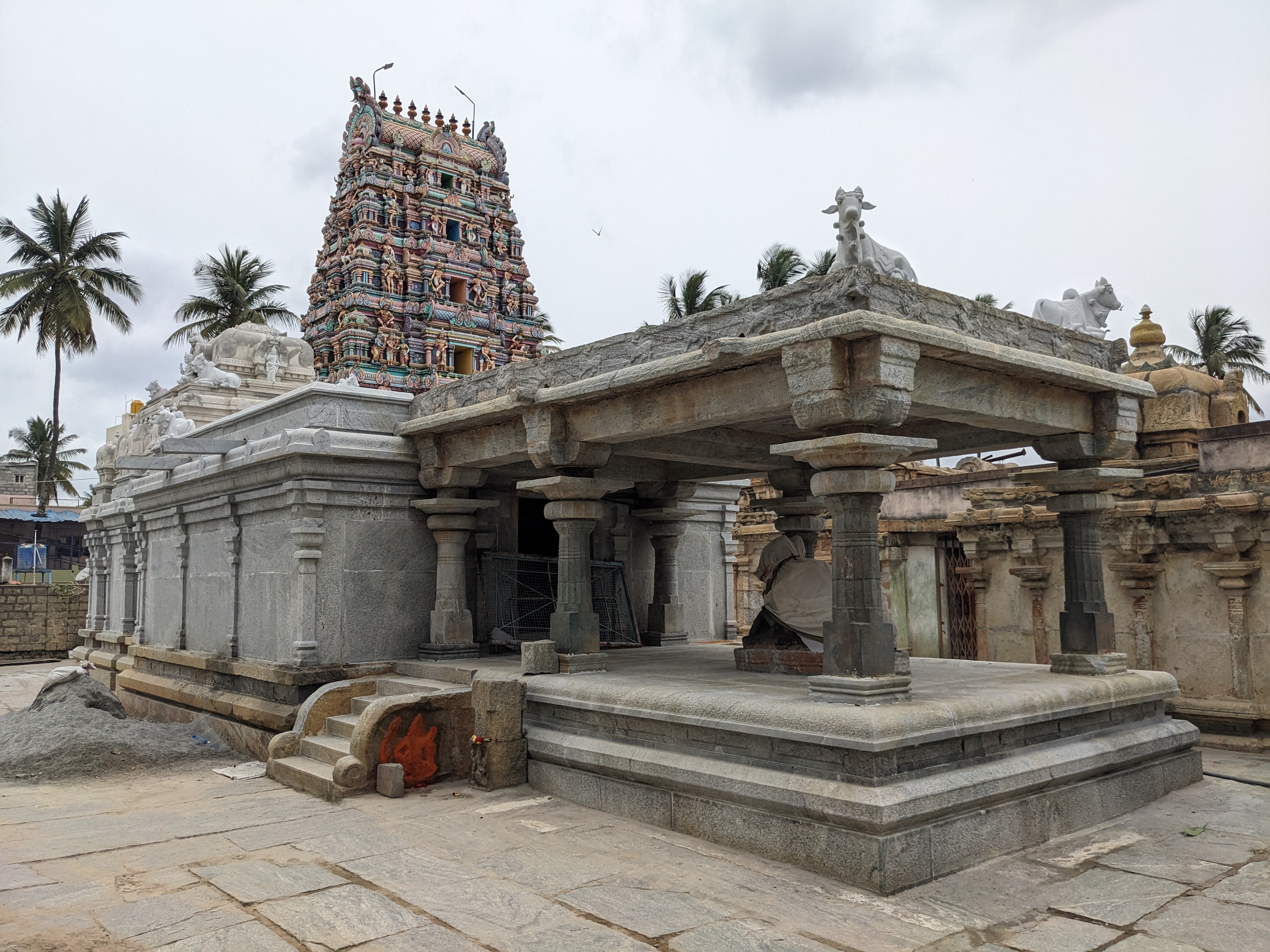
Wide angle view of the Begur 1400CE Nagareshwara Temple Gowdu Sonnappa inscription

The inscription is located on the first door frame of the Nageshwara Temple, which lies within the Panchalineshwara temple complex. The Inscription is paleographically dated to 1400CE, while the architectural features of the Nageshwara Temple suggest it was likely built around 900 CE. This inscription is the only one found at the Nageshwara Temple, whereas other temples in the complex contain more inscriptions. It records the donation of equipment made by Gowdu Sonappa to the Nageshwara Temple. Gowdu Sonappa, the son of a merchant named Chellandi Shetti and was likely the headman of Begur or a nearby village. Donating equipment for temple rituals was a common practice, with similar records found in temples at Lepakshi, Tirumala, Srirangam, and other locations.

=== Summary ===
The equipment donated by Gauda Sonnappa to the Nageshwara Temple includes a hariyaana (plate), an addanige (low three-legged stool for placing a plate), a gampinavarathi (an unidentified type of arati), a dhooparati (stand for burning dhoop incense), a battalu (bowl), and a shanku (conch). This inscription is recorded in Epigraphia Carnatica, Volume 9, as Bangalore Inscription Number 90.

=== Physical characteristics ===
This inscription is carved on a stone that measures 77 cm in height and 30 cm in width, with characters typically measuring 4.1 cm tall, 3.6 cm wide, and 0.27 cm deep

=== Transliterations of the text ===
It is published in the Epigraphia Carnatica Volume 9. The text below in the text is the Mythic Society's rereading.

Digital Images of each of the characters of this inscription, images of the inscription itself, summary and the other information about the inscription have been shared via Akshara Bhandara software.

Line Number	Kannada	IAST
1	ಸ್ವಸ್ತಿ ಶ್ರೀ ನಗರೇ	svasti śrī nagare
2	ಶ್ವರ ದೇವರಿಗೆ ಬೇ	śvara devarigĕ be
3	ಹೂರ ಚೆಲ್ಲಾಂ	hūra cĕllāṃ
4	ಡಿ ಸೆಟ್ಟಿಯ ಮ	ḍi sĕṭṭiya ma
5	ಗ ಗಉಡು ಸೊ	ga gaüḍu sŏ
6	ಂಣಪ್ಪನು ಕೊ	ṃṇappanu kŏ
7	ಟ್ಟ ಉಪಕರಣ	ṭṭa upakaraṇa
8	ಹರಿಯಾಣ ಅ	hariyāṇa a
9	ಡ್ಡಣಿಗೆ ಗಂಪಿ	ḍḍaṇigĕ gaṃpi
10	ನವಾರತಿ ಧೂಪಾ	navārati dhūpā
11	ರತಿ ಬಟ್ಟಲು ಶಂ	rati baṭṭalu śaṃ
12	ಕು	ku

=== Translation ===
The text of translation is published in the Epigraphia Carnatica. It reads as follows,

"Be it well, For the god Nagaresvara, Behura Challandi-Setti's son Gaudu-Sonnappa gave vessels (namely) — a tray, a tripod, a bowl for the wave-offering of perfume and incense, and a conch-shell."

== Begur 1426CE Chokkimayya Jinalaya inscription ==
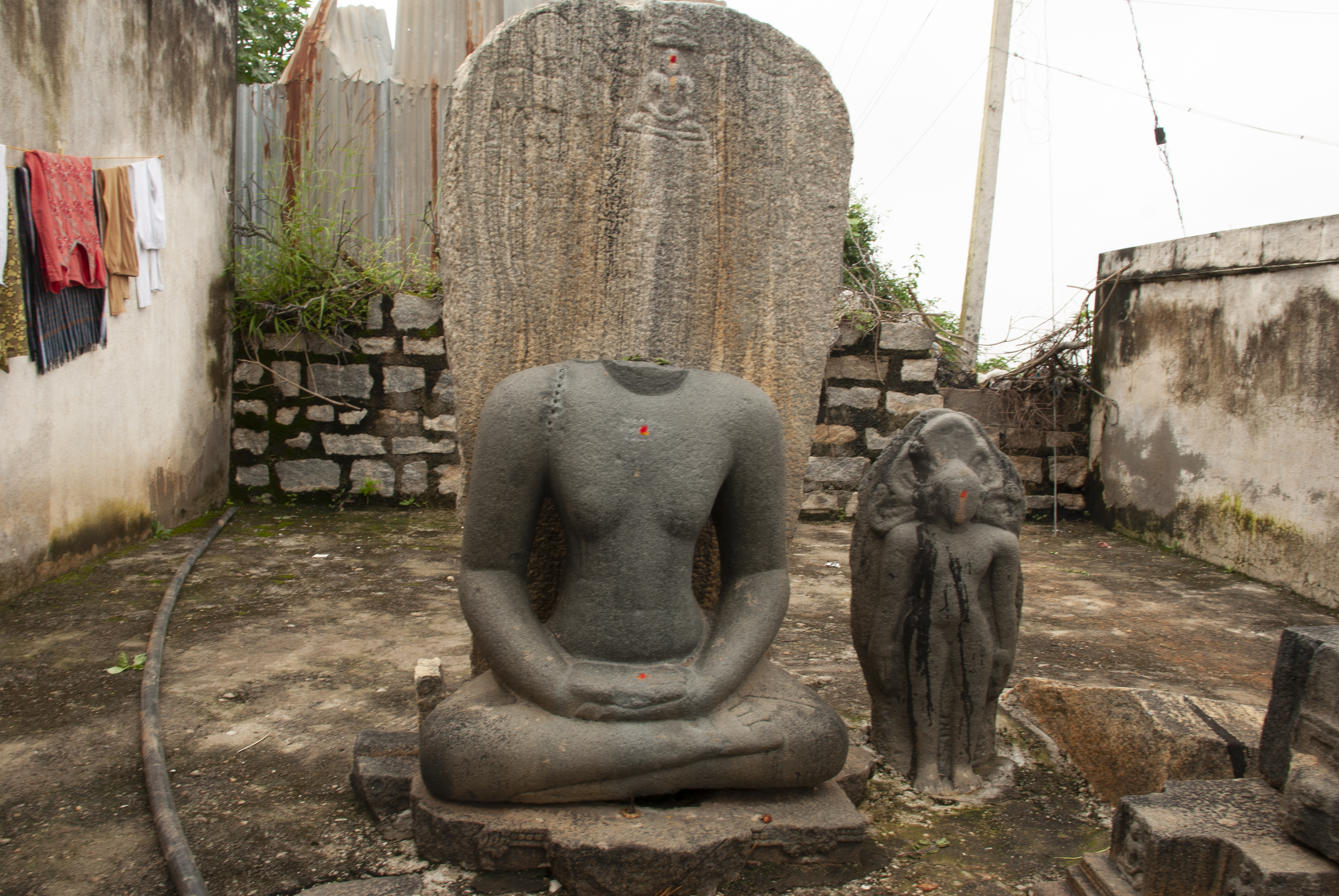
Jain sculptures in Begur

This 15th-century inscription records donations made to the Chokkimayya Jinalaya, a basadi (Jain temple) that once existed in Begur. The inscription was commissioned by Nagiya Kariyappa Dandanayaka, whose title, dandanayaka, indicates he held a military position. Notably, the inscription was discovered in Shravanappana Dinne. "Shravanappa" is a colloquial form of śramaṇa, the term for a Jain monk, suggesting that the location's name reflects an earlier Jain presence. Although this inscription has been documented, its current physical condition remains unknown.

=== Transliteration of the text in English ===
The text was published in the Epigraphia Carnatica. It reads as follows,

"srimat-parama-gambhira-syad-vadamogha-lanchhanam | jiyat trailokya-nathasya sasanam Jina-sasanam ||

svasti Saka-varusha 1349 neya Parabhava-samvatsaradalu sri-Mula-sanghada Desiya-ganada Kondakundauvayada Pustuka-gachchhadi srimatu Pra........siddhanti-devara shishyarappa srimachchhubhachandra-siddhanti-devara gudda Chakkimayyaua Nagiya Kariyappa-danda-nayakar appa danda Morasu-nadalvandekadi Kaliyur-agrahara kotta sarva-badha-pariharavagi Chokkimayya Jinalayam chandradityarullannaka salvantagi......dharmamanadasuvantagi (usual imprecatory phrases) srima...............ndanayaka Chokkimayya.............radu nilisidanu kalu ...... madisikotta."

=== Translation ===
The text was published in the Epigraphia Carnatica. It reads as follows,

"Having the supreme profound syad-vada as a fruit-bearing token, may it prevail, the doctrine of the lord of the three worlds, the Jina doctriue. Be it well. (On the date specified), of the sri-Mula-sangha, Desiya-gana, Kondakundanvaya and Pustuka-gachha, Prasiddhanti-deva's disciple Subhachandra-siddhanti-deva's lay.disciple Chakkimayya's (son) Nagiya Kariyappa-dandanayaka when ruling Morasu-nad, made a grant (effaced) for the Kaliyur agrahara, that the Chokkiimayya Jinalaya might continue as long as sun and moon. Imprecations."

== Begur 1300CE Vallala Jiyar inscription ==
This is a Tamil inscription written in the Grantha script. It is a donatory inscription from the 14th century CE, made by Vallala Jiyar to the deity Tirunagesvaran of the Begur Panchalingeshwara Temple. The donation was intended to provide offerings of rice, sandalwood, and other items, as well as a procession during the festival in the month of chittirai, for the benefit of Vallala Jiyar's father, Sembandai Jiyar. The inscription states that the grant is under the protection of the Mahesvaras. This inscription is documented in Epigraphia Carnatica, but its current physical condition is unknown.

=== Transcription of the text in English ===
The text was published in the Epigraphia Carnatica. It reads as follows,

".........purva-pakshattu Dutiyaiyum S'evva .. kkilamai nal Vallaja-Siyarena engal nayanar Tirunagisvaram-u........l tamappanar Sembandai-siyarkku naDr-aga Sittirai-ttiru-nal elundarula amudupadi sattuppadi ullitta sevaikka......kke vittom idarku-ttappuna-van Gangai-kkaraiyir-kuraypasuvai-kkonran pavatte povan sri-Mahesvara-rakshai."

=== Translation ===
The text was published in the Epigraphia Carnatica. It reads as follows,

(On the date specified), for the benefit of my father Sembandai-jiyar, I, Vallala-jiyar, made a grant for the god Tirunigesaramudaiyar to provide for offerings of rice, sandal and other requirements, and for a procession during the festival in the month of Sittirai. (Usual final imprecatory sentence). This grant is under the protection of Mahesvaras."

== Begur 1262CE Rajaraja Karkata Maharaja Sokkanayan inscription ==
This is a Tamil inscription written in the Grantha script, dating to the 13th century CE. It records a land grant to the deity Tirunagesvaram-udaiya Mahadevar of the Begur Panchalingeshwara Temple by Rajaraja Karkata Maharaja Sokkanayan. The inscription is documented in Epigraphia Carnatica, though its current physical condition is unknown.

=== Transliteration of the text in English ===
The text was published in the Epigraphia Carnatica. It reads as follows,

"Svasti sri Rajaraja-Karkkata-maharaja Sokkanayanena Tirunagesvaram-udaiya Mahadevarkku Orriyavanapalli nanjai punjai narppal-ellaiyum devark........."

=== Translation ===
The text was published in the Epigraphia Carnatica. It reads as follows,

"I, Rajaraja-Karkata-maharaja Sokkanayan, granted the wet and dry lands with their four boundaries in the village of Orriyavanpalli for the god Tirunagesvaram-udaiya Mahadevar."

== Begur 1110CE Tamattandan inscription ==
This is a Tamil inscription written in the Grantha script. It is a donatory inscription from the 12th century CE, created during the Hoysala rule. The inscription documents a grant to the Begur Panchalingeshwara temple by Tamattandan, son of Solavelar, a chieftain of the Morasunadu. The inscription refers to the Begur lake as the Veppur Periya Ēri (Veppur's big tank). It is noted that Begur was historically also known as Veppur, a Tamilized form of the word. The inscription is documented in Epigraphia Carnatica, but its present physical status is unknown.

=== Transliteration of the text in English ===
The text was published in the Epigraphia Carnatica. It reads as follows,

"svastisri Poysala-Deva-rajya Mudikonda-Sola-mandalattu Rajendira-Sola-vala-nattu Murasu-nattu..............nattu gamundagalil Sola-velar magan Virudaraja-bayankara Murasu-nad-alvar magan Tamattandan ana Murasu.........rajan Veppur periya eri udaippa padan-kandaga-kalani devadanam aga nadapoguram. devadanam aga vittu ainnura-pon ner-madil-iduvittu i-kkoyilukku Era-battan magan Periyandan ana Narpattennayira-battanukku madapattiyam kaniy-aga ssada....kudattom inda dhanmam irikkuvan Gengai-karaiyil kurar-pasu-konran pavam-padu-van sri-Mahe........"

=== Translation ===
The text was published in the Epigraphia Carnatica. It reads as follows,

"During the rule of Poysala Deva, Tamattandan, alias Murasu rajan, son of Murasu-nad-alvar, terrible to titled kings, who was the son of Sola-velar — one of the gamundas of Murasu-nadu in Rajendira-Sola-vala-nadu of Mudigonda-Sola-mandalam — granted certain lands (specified) below the big tank of Veppur as a devadana, caused a surrounding wall to be built at a cost of 500 pon, and gave certain lands to Periyandan, alias Narpattennayira-battan son of Era-battan, for conducting the duties of superintendent of the matha (madapattiyam) in this temple."

== Begur 1270CE Alagiyar and Vilakkavayiran inscription ==
This is a Tamil donatory inscription of the 13th century CE to the Begur Panchalingeshwara temple which records setting up of a goddess Tiruvidinachchiyar by an Alagiyar and a donation of a Lamp stand by Vilakkavayiran.The inscription is documented in Epigraphia Carnatica but its physical status is not known.

=== Transliteration of the text in English ===
The text was published in the Epigraphia Carnatica. It reads as follows,

".......gapakkam-udaiyan magan Alagiyar elunda.. livitta Tiruvidi-nachchiyaruni Avudai........yum elundarulivittar Puvadara,- ril Vilakkavayiran itta dipa-pattiram idai padinettu."

=== Translation ===
The text was published in the Epigraphia Carnatica. It reads as follows,

"pakkam-udaiyan's son Alagiyar set up (the image of) a goddess to be taken out in procession in the streets......Vilakkavayiran gave a lamp-stand weighing eighteen."

== Begur 1294CE Kulottunga Sola Tagadadirayar Mara Sika Devar ==
This is a Tamil donatory inscription in the Grantha script dated to the 13th Century CE. It records the donation of offerings of rice for the god Kadikandiyaduram-udaiya-nayanarku of the Begur Panchalingeshwara temple by a Kulottunga Sola Tagadadirayar Mara Sika Devar. The inscription is documented in Epigraphia Carnatica but its physical status is not known.

=== Transliteration of the text in English ===
The text was published in the Epigraphia Carnatica. It reads as follows,

"svasti sri sarvabhuma-chakravattiga| sri-Posala-vira-Ramanata-Devarku 'yandu 40 vadu Adi-mada-mudal svasti sri Kulottunga-Sola Tagadadirayar Marasika-devarrena udaiyar Kadikandiyasuram-udaiva-nayanarku mun-nalil tiruppadimarr-illadapadiyale nam tiruppadimarru sellumpadikku nam-udaiya urgalil S'ikkanpajliy-eriyile kandaga-viraiyum Vettapajliy-eriyile kandaga-viraiyum Velluriy-eriyile iru-kandaga-viraiyum Idaiyiuril Munnilakuttaiyil kandagamum Tamaraikuttaiyil kanda-gamum aga viraiy-aru-kandagamum sandra-aditta-varai sella idukku vignam-panniavar Gamgai-karaiyil kural-pasuvai konra papattai. povan."

=== Translation ===
The text was published in the Epigraphia Carnatica. It reads as follows,

"In the 40th year of the reign of the universal emperor sri-Posala-vira-Ramanadadevar, Aa there had been no provision made formerly for offerings of rice for the god Kadikandiyasuram-udaiya-nayanar, to provide for offerings of rice for the god, I, Kulottunga-Sola-Tagadadirayar Mara-Sika-devar, granted (from the date specified), to continue for as long as the moon and the sun exist, certain quantities (specified) of paddy from lands situated in different villages (named), (Usual final imprecatory sentence)."

== Begur 1300CE Dhoopa Deepa inscription ==
This is a Tamil inscription in the grantha script.It is a 14th-century donatory inscription which is only published with the last verses of the record, it includes various ritual materials like conch, lamp, incense, water cups and bell. The inscription is documented in Epigraphia Carnatica but its physical status is not known.

=== Transliteration of the text in English ===
The text was published in the Epigraphia Carnatica. It reads as follows,

"........parikalam kalum tanni-vattil nal diipa-dipa mani sangu sri-Mahesvara-rakshai i-dharmam...... "

=== Translation ===
The text was published in the Epigraphia Carnatica. It reads as follows,

"water cups, incense-burner, lamp, bell and conch-shell to the temple. This charity is under the protection of Maheshvaras."

== Begur 950CE Ravikanti Siddhanti's inscription ==
It is an incomplete Kannada inscription dated paleographically to the 950 CE, the context or the meaning cannot be deduced from the reading. It is documented in the Epigraphia Carnatica Volume 9, its present physical status remains unknown.

=== Transliteration of the text in English ===
The text was published in the Epigraphia Carnatica. It reads as follows,

".....Setti Raya-putra....na-siddhanta-bha......vara sishyar Kumaranandi-bhattara.....Kamapura Bida-kandada Madambapattana.....bhimukhagaliyar kramadinda viharisuttu...."

=== Translation ===
The text was published in the Epigraphia Carnatica. It reads as follows,

"Raya's son.....disciple of.......Kumaranandi-bhatara, with his face towards Kamapura and Madambapattaua of the Bide-kanda, accoruing to custom wandering about....."

== Conservation and Current Status ==
The preservation of the Begur inscriptions and hero stones faces challenges common to historical monuments in rapidly urbanizing areas, alongside unique local factors. Many stones are located in situ within the Panchalingeshwara Temple complex or its vicinity, exposed to weathering and potential human impact. Some stones documented historically are now untraceable, likely victims of development, neglect, or vandalism. The condition of those remaining varies; some hero stones were reported as cracked or leaning precariously against walls.

A significant event concerning conservation occurred in 2015. The state Department of Archaeology, Museums and Heritage planned to relocate 15 veeragallu, including the historically crucial "Bengaluru War" stone, from the temple premises to the Government Museum in Bengaluru for better preservation. However, this plan met with strong opposition from Begur residents, who expressed concerns based on traditional beliefs that moving the stones would bring misfortune to the village. The entire gram panchayat signed a memorandum protesting the move. After a year of impasse, the authorities, including the endowment commissioner, decided to respect the local sentiments and abandoned the relocation plan. The revised strategy involved conserving the stones in situ by installing them on dedicated pedestals within the temple grounds. This episode highlights the complex interplay between heritage management protocols and local community beliefs and attachments to historical artifacts.

Complementing physical conservation efforts, the Mythic Society's "Bengaluru Inscriptions 3D Digital Conservation Project" represents a major modern intervention. Launched in 2021, this project aims to create high-resolution 3D digital models of all traceable inscriptions (estimated around 1500) in Bengaluru Urban, Bengaluru Rural, and Ramanagara districts, including those at Begur. Using non-contact 3D scanning technology (e.g., Artec Space Spider) and advanced software (e.g., MeshLab), the project creates "digital twins" of the inscriptions. These digital models serve multiple purposes:

- Digital Preservation: They act as a permanent record, mitigating the risk of data loss due to physical damage or destruction of the original stones.
- Enhanced Research: The high-resolution models allow epigraphists to study the inscriptions remotely with tools for magnification, virtual relighting, and applying filters, often revealing details obscured on the physical stone and leading to more accurate readings and corrections of previous interpretations.
- Accessibility and Awareness: The digital data, including models, images, transliterations, translations, and contextual information, is made publicly accessible through online platforms, notably an interactive GIS map ('Inscription Stones of Bengaluru' and a related 'Hero Stones' map). This democratizes access for researchers, students, and the general public, fostering greater awareness of local history. The project also publishes findings in journals and magazines like Bengaluru Itihaasa Vaibhava.

The project uses specific icons on its map to indicate the status of documented inscriptions: a green heart for traceable stones, a red skull for lost or destroyed ones, and a question mark for those whose current status is unknown. As of late 2023/early 2024, the project had surveyed over 1000 sites and digitally conserved over 400-600 inscriptions across the three districts.

The current status of the Begur artifacts is thus a combination of physical presence (some in situ on pedestals, the major Nagatara hero stone in the Bangalore Museum ) and digital preservation through the ongoing Mythic Society initiative. This hybrid approach reflects both the challenges and the technological opportunities in safeguarding historical inscriptions in the 21st century.
