= Begur, Bengaluru =

Begur DoddaBeguru
- Suburb
- Location in Bengaluru, India
- Coordinates: 12.872347°N 77.632871°E
- Country: India
- State: Karnataka
- Metro: Bengaluru

Languages
  - Official: Kannada
- Time zone: UTC+5:30 (IST)
- PIN: 560 114
- Vehicle registration: KA-51

Begur or Begūru is a suburb of Bengaluru in the Indian state of Karnataka. It is located off Bengaluru-Hosur highway. It is said to have been a prominent place during the rule of the Western Ganga Dynasty and later the Chola Kingdom.

== Begur Fort ==
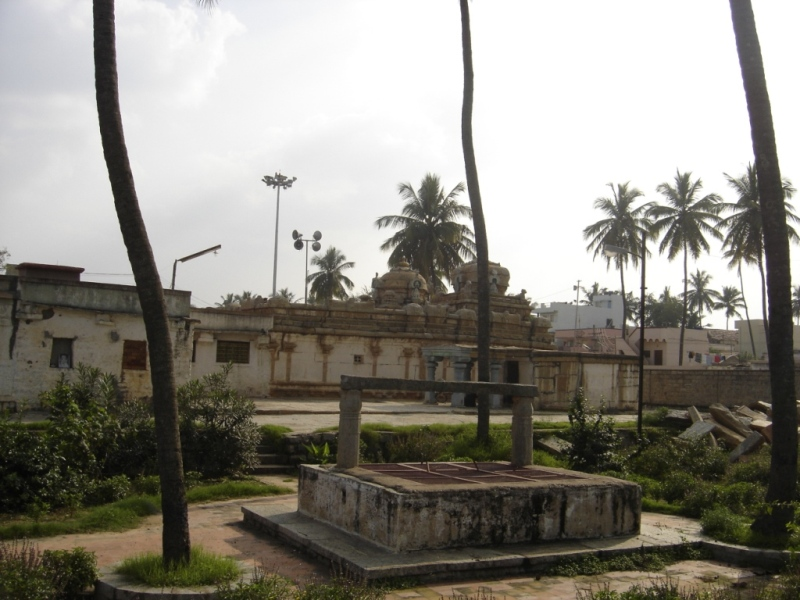
Historical Naganatheshwara temple at Begur

Panchalingeshwara temple is located in the centre of Begur. It has a 1100 years old inscription which is the oldest existing reference to a place called 'Bengaluru'. The area was ruled by the Western Ganga Dynasty and in the 10th century the Cholas had acquired the territory.

The Nageshwara temple was built by Ereganga Neetimarga around 9th century and Panchaligeshwara temple was built by Ganga Kingdom.

Near the temple, there exists a tiny circular fort, about 1.4 km^{2} in area, is built by the Gangas (Since Tondabbe was living in the fort around 890 CE and her inscriptions are in the Fort saying she did Sallekhana before her death. The date of construction is unknown (no research done), but the existence of a 1100-year-old inscription on the gateway of the fort would suggest the same age for the fort.

== Transport ==
Begur is well connected to KR Market, Shivaji Nagar and Kempegowda Bus Stand by BMTC services. The suburb is proximate to NH-44 which connects to Hosur, a border town of the neighbouring state of Tamil Nadu. Bangalore Airport and railway station are reachable with the available Outer Ring Road passing through this area along with availability of BMTC buses to and fro between Begur and central part of the city. The arterial road passing through the area, Begur Road, is planned to be widened to ease the growing vehicular traffic on the route.

== See also ==
- Begur inscriptions and hero stones
