= Nageshvara Temple, Begur =

Coordinates: 12.87674°N 77.62671°E

Nageshvara Temple
- Hindu temple
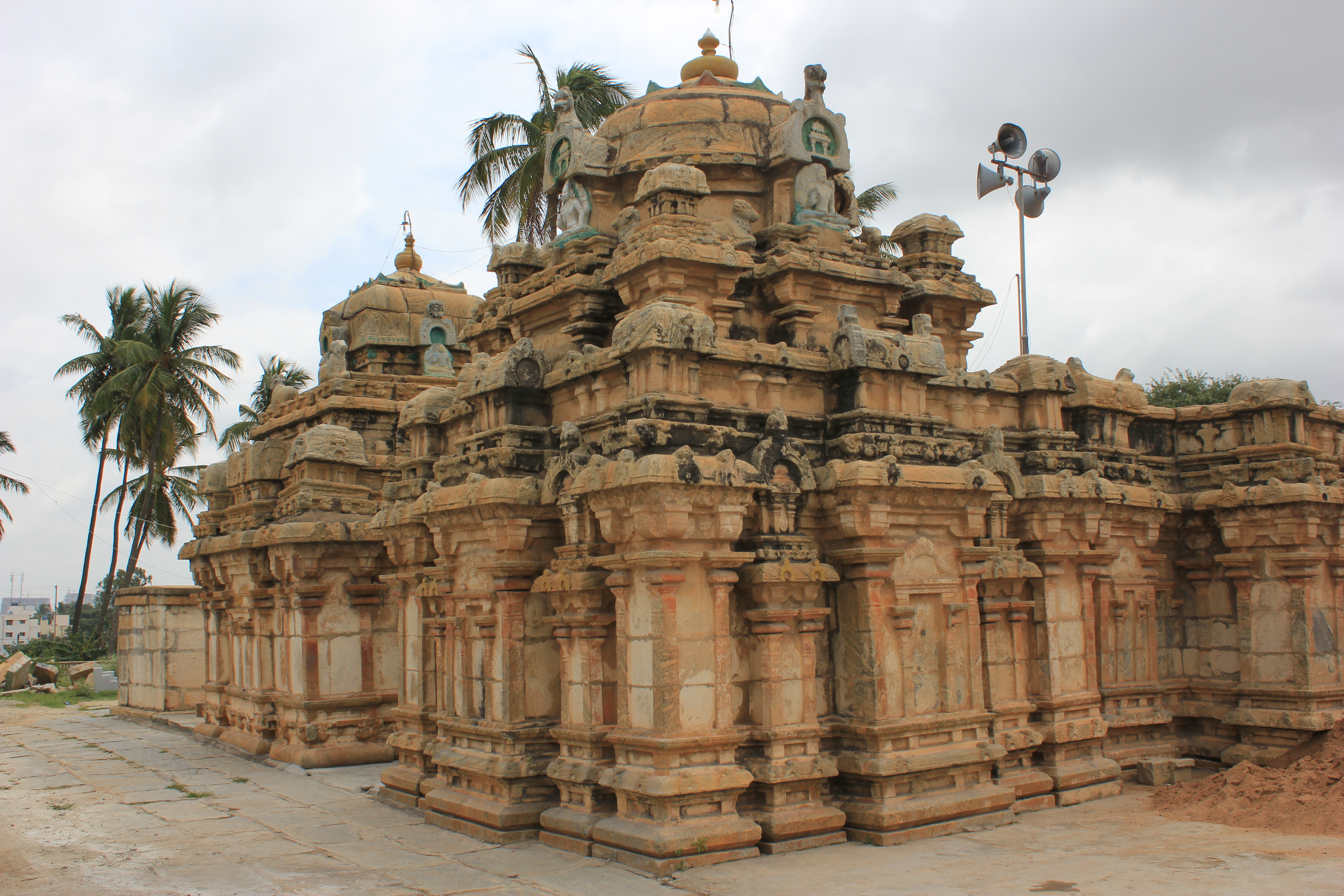
- Historical Naganatheshwara temple at Begur
- Interactive map of Nageshvara Temple
- Country: India
- State: Karnataka
- District: Bangalore Urban

Languages
  - Official: Kannada
- Time zone: UTC+5:30 (IST)

The Nageshvara temple complex (also spelt Nagesvara and called Naganatheshvara locally) is located in Begur, a small town within the Bangalore urban district of Karnataka state, India. Two shrines within the temple complex, the Nageshvara swamy main deity was consecrated by Rishi’s and temple were commissioned during the rule of Western Ganga dynasty kings Nitimarga I (also called Ereganga Neetimarga, r. 843–870) and Ereyappa Nitimarga II (also called Ereganga Neetimarga II, r. 907–921). The remaining shrines are considered a later day legacy of the rule of the Chola dynasty, Hoysala dynasty, Vijayanagara Empire over the region. Ravana villain in Ramayana lost his atma linga in Gokarna and while returning to Sri Lanka he worshiped Nageshwara. An Old Kannada inscription, dated c. 890, that describes a "Bengaluru war" (modern Bangalore city) was discovered in this temple complex by the epigraphist R. Narasimhachar. The inscription is recorded in "Epigraphia Carnatica" (Vol 10 supplementary). This is the earliest evidence of the existence of a place called Bengaluru.

== Temple plan ==
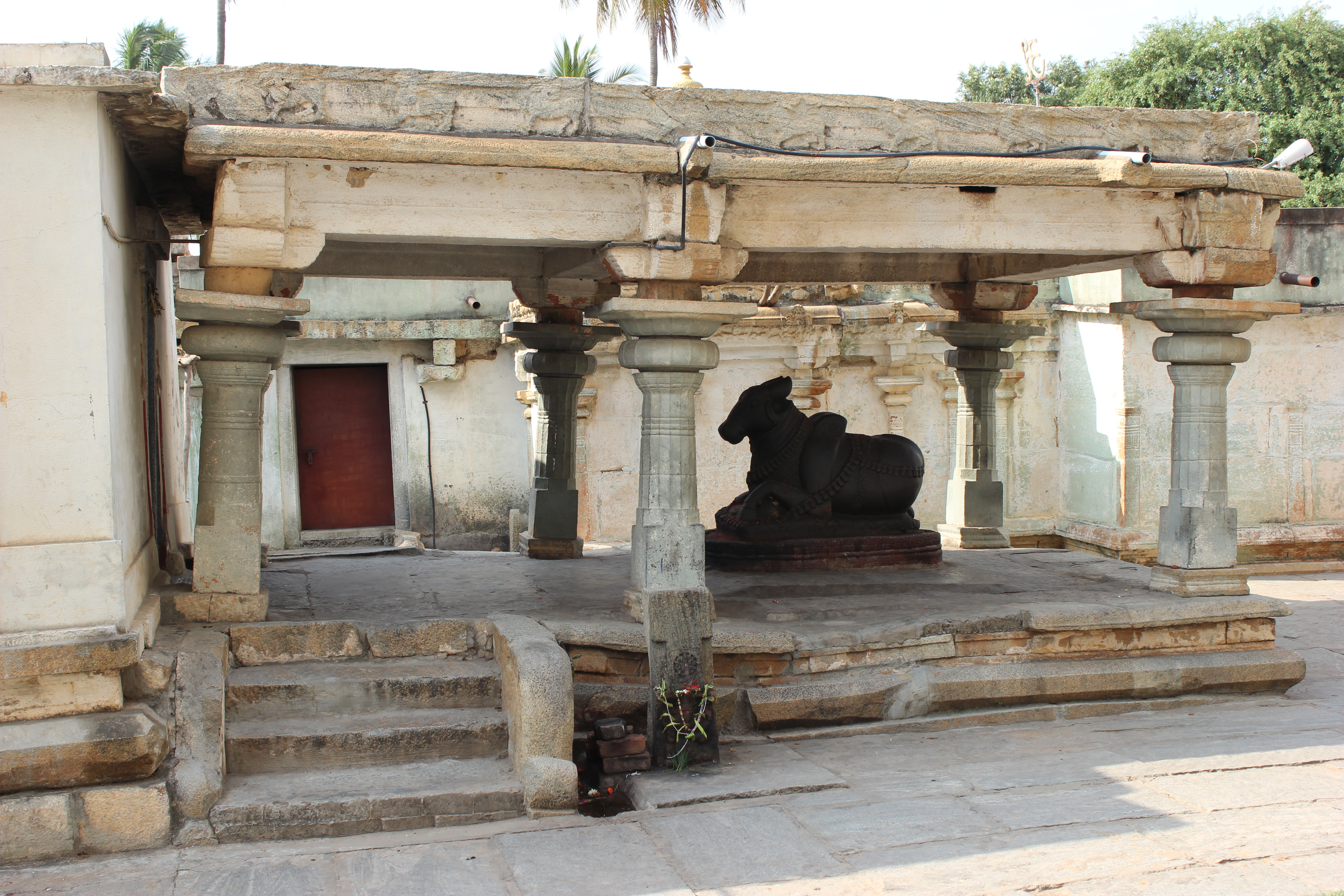
Nandi mantapa in Nageshvara temple, Begur

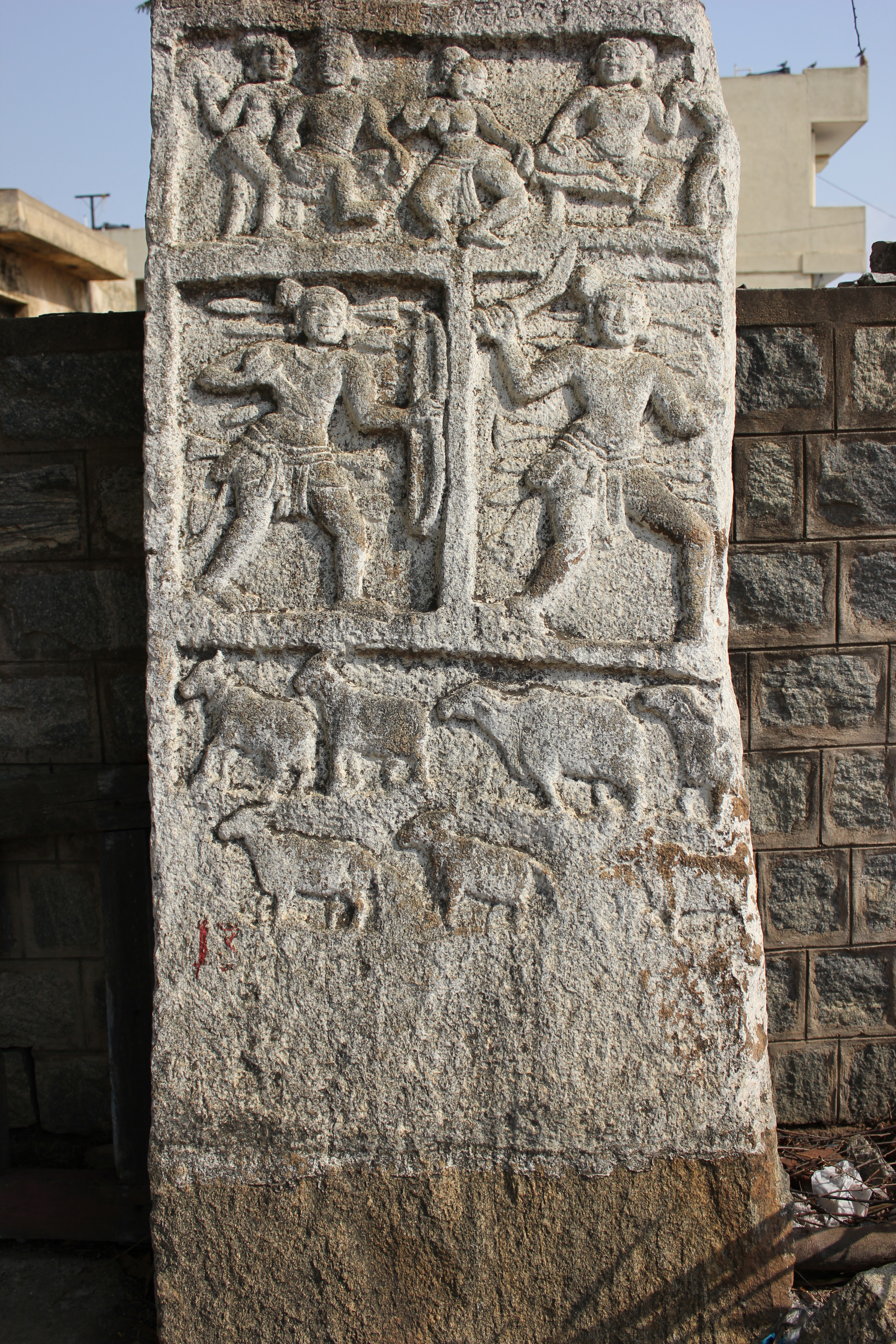
Hero stone (Virgal) at Nageshvara temple, Begur

The Nageshvara temple has a simple square sanctum (garbhagriha), a vestibule (antarala) that connects the sanctum to a "great closed hall" (maha-mantapa or navaragna) which leads to an open hall (agra-mantapa). The entrance to the open hall is via balustraded steps in the south-west and north-west corners. The open hall has six unequally spaced pillars, with an image of Nandi (vehicle or vahana of the god Shiva) placed on a "lotus platform" (padma-pitha) in the outer bay (compartment formed between four pillars). The white granite pillars are simple in design; with a square base (pitha), plain lower part and fluted octagonal in the centre. Many parts of the temple, including the open and closed halls appear to have been subjected to renovation in later periods. The sanctum has a linga, the universal symbol of the god Shiva.

The ceiling in the closed hall (navaranga) has the characteristic Western Ganga artistic touch, the eight panel sculptures in a square grids (called the ashta-dik-palaka) which includes an image of four handed Uma-Maheshvara (the god Shiva with his consort Parvati). The ceiling of the open hall also has the grid sculptures with a seated image of Shiva and Parvati in the centre. Other sculptures kept in the hall include Mahishasuramardini (a form of the goddess Durga), a unique two handed Ganesh, and Kalabhairava (a form of Shiva). The vertical doorjamb (sakha) have the typical carvings of creepers with ganas (attendants of the god Shiva from Hindu Mythology) in loops with lotuses (padma) at the terminations. On top of the doorjamb, at the centre of the lintel (lalata), is an image of Gajalakshmi (a form of the goddess Lakshmi) with elephants on either side.

The Nageshvarasvami temple, also a Western Ganga construction, faces east, has a square plan for the sanctum, a vestibule, an open hall, a detached hall called mukha-mantapa whose ceiling is supported by eight pillars. An image of Nandi is placed in the mukha-mantap making it serve the purpose of a Nandi-mantapa (Nandi hall). The base of the entrance (dvara) is flanked by niches with images of Ganga-Yamuna figures with attendant ladies. This appears to be a Chalukya–Rashtrakuta influence.

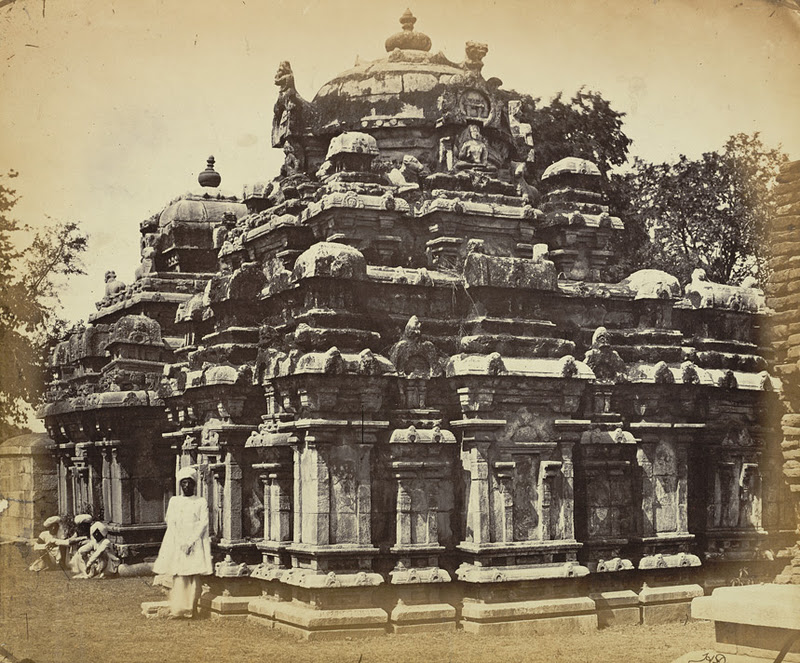
9th century temple at Begur (pic taken in c.1868), by Henry Dixon, from the Archaeological Survey of India Collections

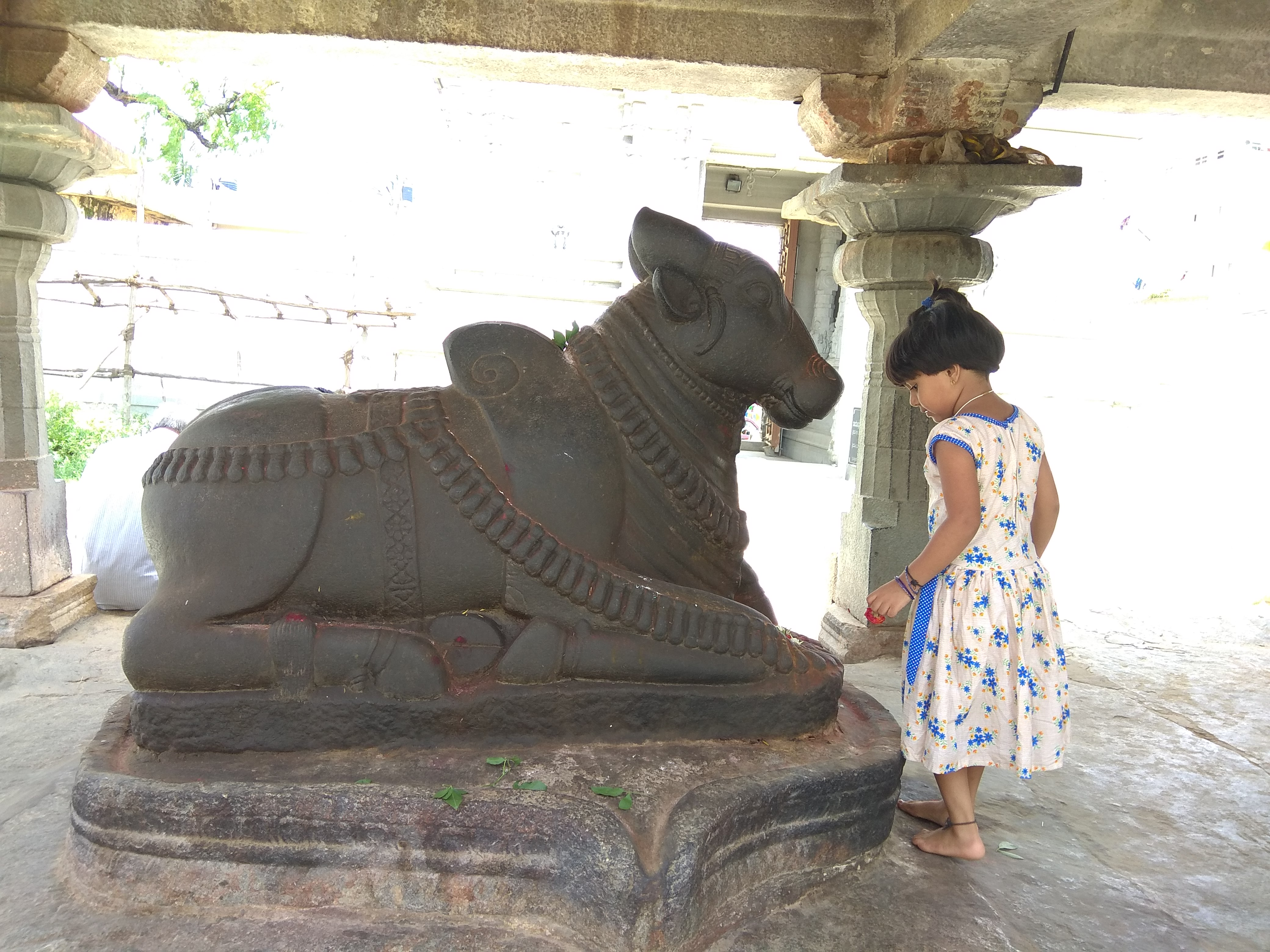
Nandi mantapa in Nageshvara temple. The Nageshvara temple complex photo is located in Begur, a small town within the Bangalore urban district of Karnataka state, India.

== See more ==
Begur (Bengaluru) Inscriptions and Herostones
