= Singapura inscriptions and hero stones =

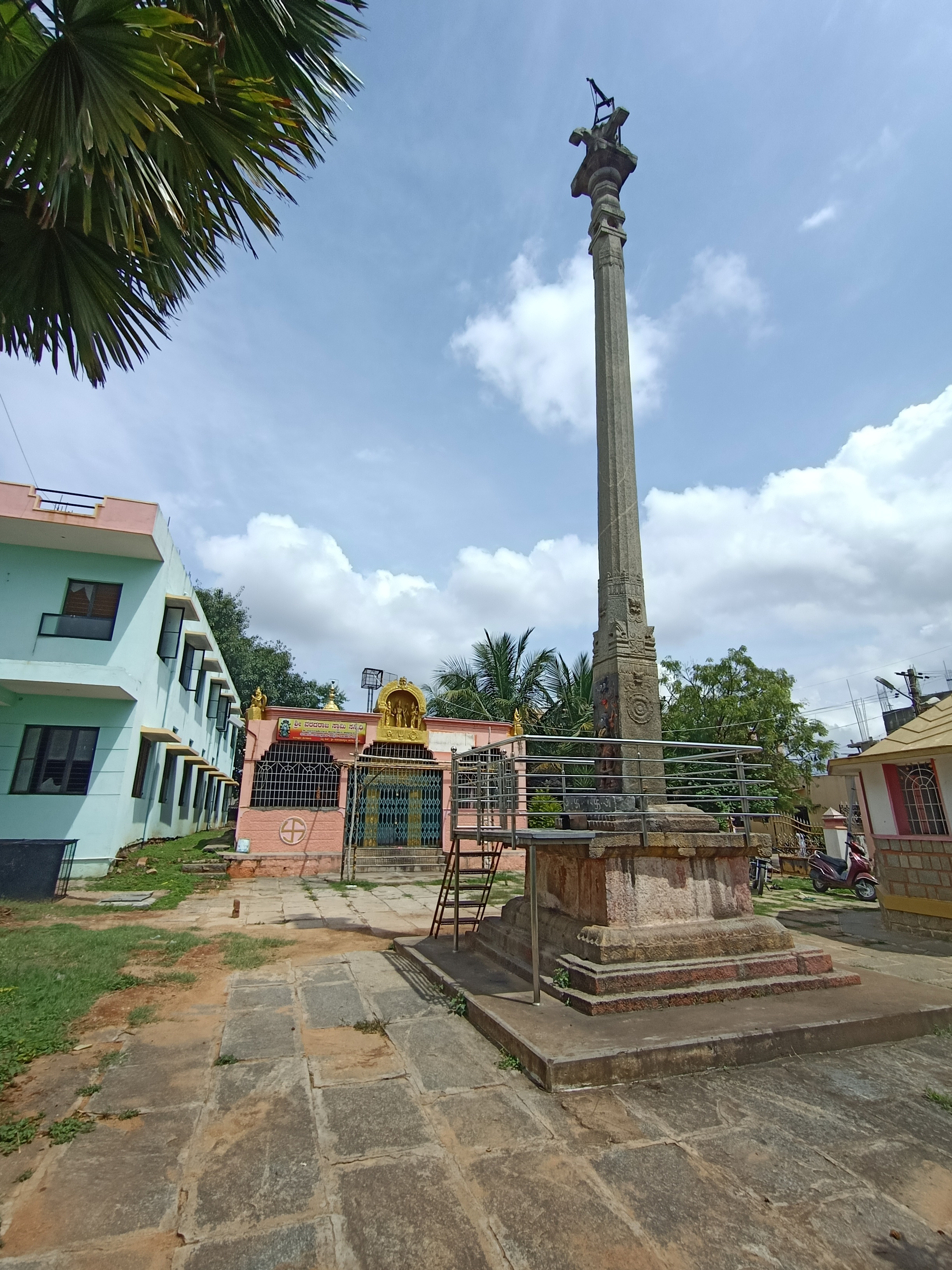
Varadaraja Swamy temple at Singapura.

Singapura is a historic locality in northwestern Bengaluru, with evidence indicating human habitation dating back to 2,500 to 3,000 years. Singapura is renowned for the Varadarajaswamy Temple. Historically, it was referred to as the Tiruvengalanatha Temple. This revered temple has a history spanning over 500 years, documented in inscriptions found in neighboring villages of Chikkabettahalli and Harohalli, dating to the 16th century. These inscriptions, along with others from Singapura itself, record grants made to the Ramanujakoota, a prominent Sri Vaishnavite religious organization established in honor of Ramanujacharya. Notably, the name Singapura is mentioned in an inscription dated to 1528 CE.

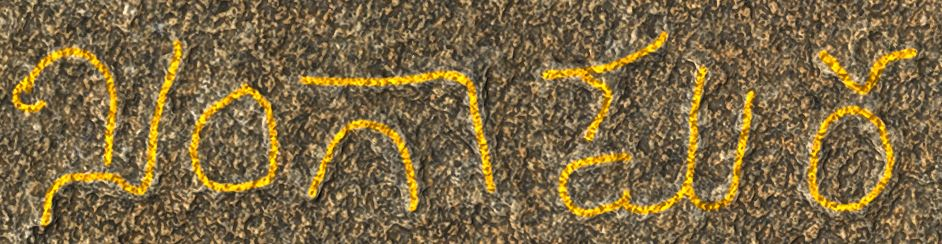
Digital image of a place name Siṃgāpura obtained by 3D scanning of the Singapura 1528CE Nalapanayaka's Donation Inscription.

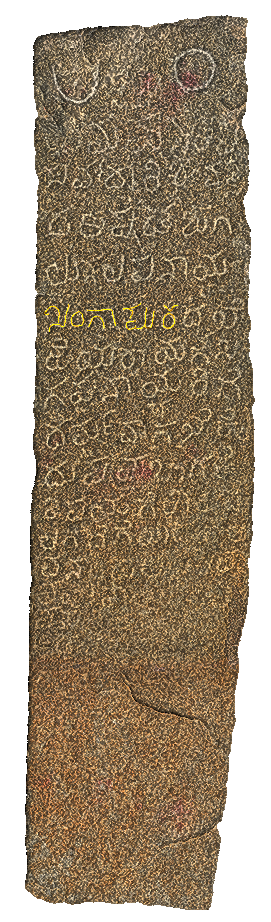
Digital Image Highlighting the Place Name 'Siṃgāpura' in the Singapura 1528CE Nalapanayaka's Donation Inscription.

The 1915 map shows Singapura as a vast revenue village, encompassing two lakes, a pond, eight wells, three water holes, and five hillocks. Covering seven kilometers in perimeter and 3.3 square kilometers(815 acres), the village was substantial. The 1871 Mysore state Census recorded 34 homes and 133 residents in Singapura. Today, this historic area is home to over 40,000 people.

== Significance ==
=== Early history ===
The early historic evidence of Singapura points to earlier settlements, with discoveries in nearby areas providing deeper insights. A microlithic tool factory in Jalahalli indicates human presence dating back 2,500 to 3,000 years, and the discovery of Roman coins in Yeswanthpur suggests ancient trade connections in the area thousands of years ago.

The Varadaraja Swamy Temple in Singapura, despite numerous modifications over the years, retains several architectural elements from the period of the 1500s. The garbhagriha (sanctum sanctorum), sukhanasi, and bhitti (walls) exhibit original styles, while the adhishtana (plinth) is mostly buried underground. Originally, the temple housed the deity Tiruvengalanatha, as indicated by the inscriptions. Additionally, the presence of a sculpted figure resembling Singappanayaka near the sukhanasi suggests his role in the temple's construction. The temple also features a striking 40-foot monolithic deepastambha (pillar for oil lamps), adorned with intricate carvings and Sri Vaishnavite symbols, adding to its historical significance and aesthetic appeal. The prominence of this temple is evident from significant donations, including two entire villages. The 1528CE inscription at Singapura refers to the temple hill as "Tirumala", marking it as a sacred site and the oldest known "Chikka-Tirupati" in the Bengaluru region. 'Chikka Tirupati', which translates to "mini-Tirupati," is a term used for temples dedicated to Lord Venkateswara that are smaller replicas of the Tirumala Venkateswara Temple.

The Singapura lake is believed to be at least 500 years old, as suggested by references to wetlands in a 1528 CE inscription found in Singapura. This indicates that the lake has been an essential part of the region’s landscape, serving as a vital resource for generations. Additionally, longtime residents recall a fort once existing in Singapura, though there is currently no visible evidence to support this claim.

=== Religious Practices ===
The most detailed information about Singapura’s religious significance comes from three inscriptions, the earliest dating to 1528CE located at Singapura. These inscriptions depict Singapura as a thriving Sri Vaishnavite center during the Vijayanagara period. The Tiruvengalanatha temple, likely the present-day Varadaraja Swamy temple, served as a central religious institution and housed a Ramanujakoota, a religious organization that provided food and lodging for devotees.

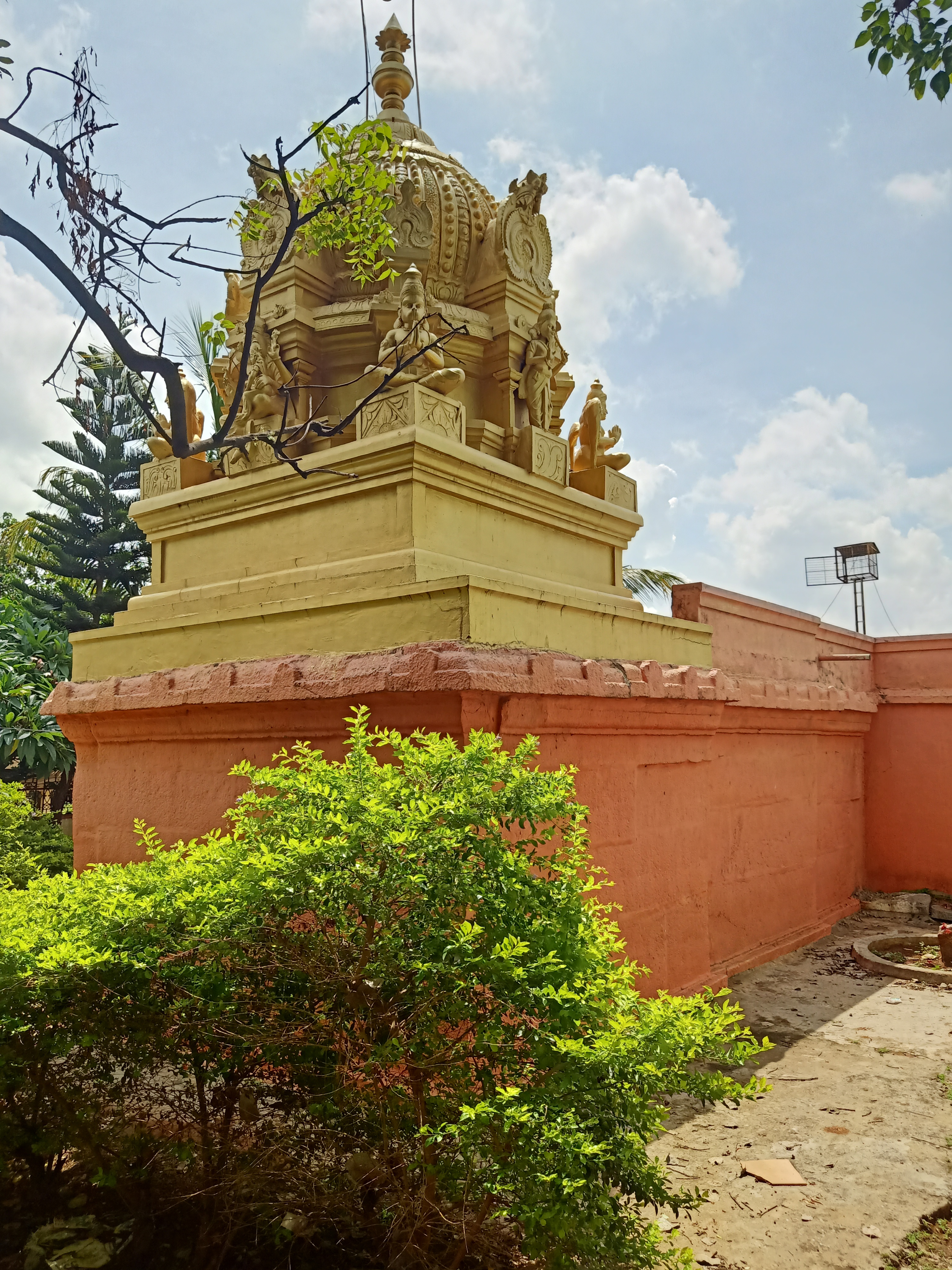
A View of the Varadaraja Swamy Temple.

Additionally, the strict food practices observed by Sri Vaishnavites, likely facilitated by the Ramanujakoota, play a key role in accommodating dietary restrictions. Beyond religious practices, a village festival, or Jathre, is still held every three years, involving the worship of deities from Singapura and neighboring villages. This enduring tradition underscores the cultural connections that link modern-day Singapura with its historical roots.

=== Linguistic Landscape ===
Bengaluru has historically been a multilingual city, and it is reasonable to assume that this linguistic diversity extended to Singapura as well. Although the 16th-century inscriptions are predominantly in Kannada.

==== Colloquial Kannada ====
The inscriptions, particularly those from the 16th century, utilize a form of colloquial Kannada, characterized by simplified grammar, phonetic variations, and the use of everyday language. Examples include:

- The term "śaṃvatsara" is used in place of the more formal "saṃvatsara" (meaning year).
- "āṣaḍa" is written instead of the standard "āṣāḍa" (referring to the Ashadha month).
- Names like "nallappanāyka" appear as simplified versions of "nalapanāyka"

These examples suggest that while formal Kannada existed, a more informal and accessible form of the language was commonly used in daily life and even in official records, such as inscriptions.

Three inscriptions pertain to the Singapura Varadarajaswamy temple, which are detailed below.

== Singapura 1528CE Nalapanayaka's Donation Inscription ==
Singapura 1528CE Nalapanayaka's Donation Inscription
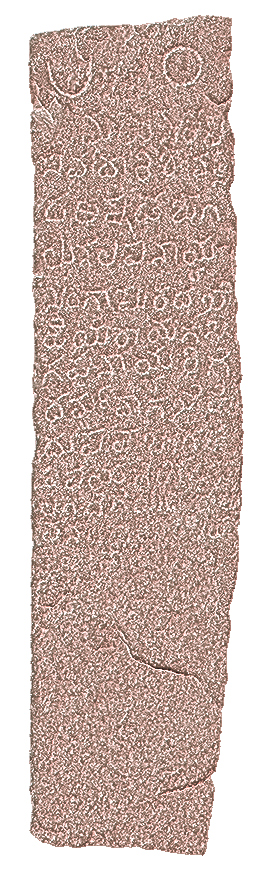
- Digital Image Obtained by 3D Scanning of The Singapura 1528CE Singappanayaka's Ramanujakoota Inscription.
- Material: Stone
- Height: 157 cm (62 in)
- Width: 38 cm (15 in)
- Writing: Kannada
- Created: 1528CE
- Discovered by: Mythic Society Bengaluru Inscriptions 3D Digital Conservation Project Team
- Present location: 13.078667°N 77.537222°E
- Language: Kannada

=== Characteristics of the Inscription ===
The inscription, dating to 1530 CE, is carved on a 157 cm high, 38 cm wide granite stone, a material commonly used for erecting Bengaluru inscriptions. Granite was favored for its durability and ability to withstand weathering. The inscription-bearing face is smooth and prepared, while the other faces remain rough and unfinished. The upper portion of the inscription-bearing face features simple carvings of the Sun and Moon, symbolizing the cosmic order and the eternal nature of the inscription.

=== Discovery of the Inscription ===
Aditya Hanumareddy initially discovered the inscription on his family's farm. His grandfather, S.C. Venkatesh, had moved the stone there in the 1970s after it was dislodged during road construction near Singapura lake.Recognizing its historical value, Venkatesh and his wife, Lakshmi Venkatesh, even worshipped the inscription on special occasions.

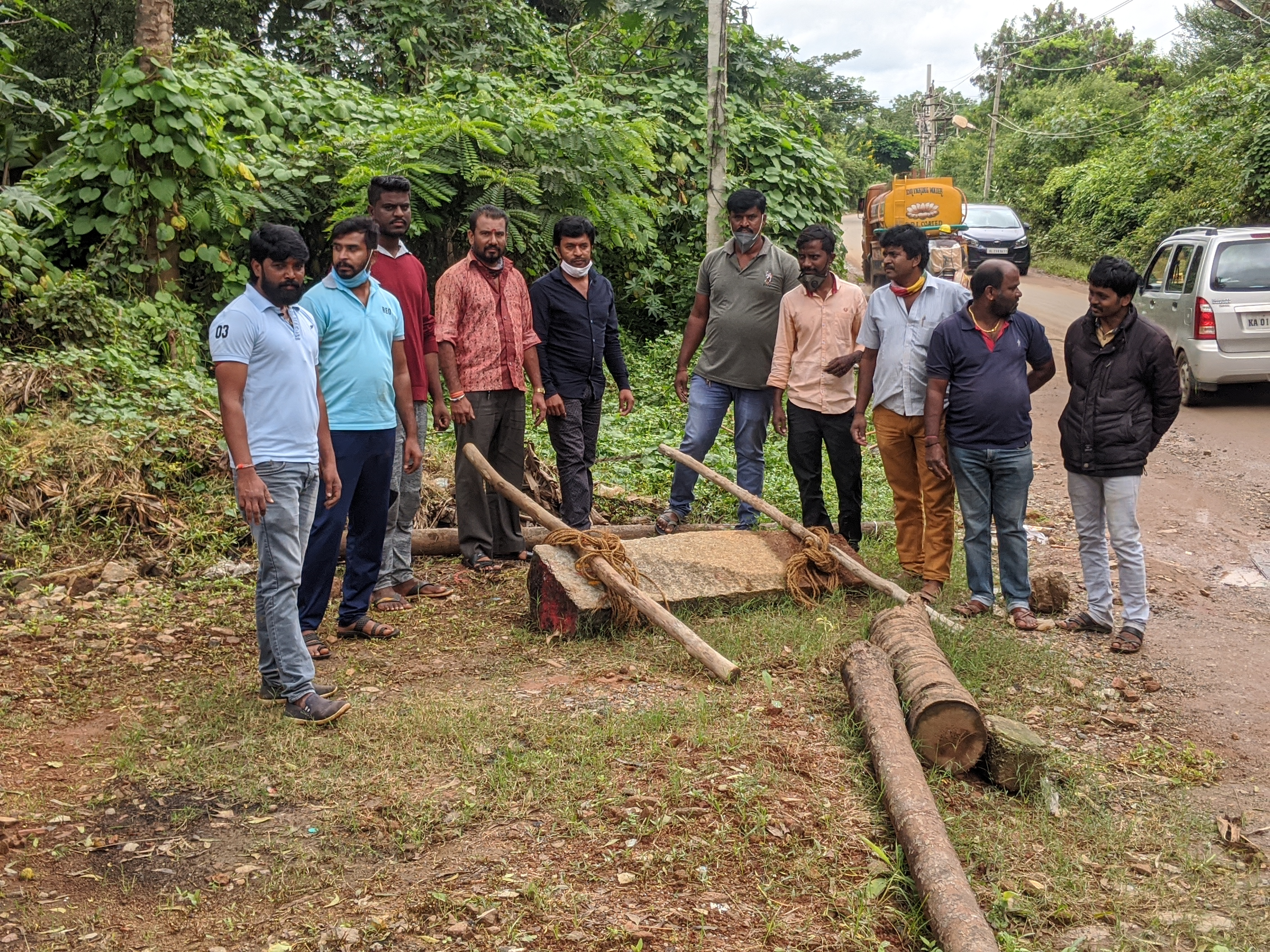
Shifting of the Singapura 1528CE Singappanayaka's Ramanujakoota Inscription.

In 2017, inspired by Udaya Kumar's Facebook live stream, Mohan Nayak visited the farm to examine the stone. With the landowner's permission, they documented the inscription through chalk-tracing and photography.

A collaborative effort between Udaya Kumar, Singapura residents, and local authorities led to the relocation of the inscription stone from the private farm to the Varadaraja Swamy temple on 13 September 2020. Residents like Mohan Nayak, S.M. Nagaraju, S.V. Srinivas, T. Ajay Kumar, S.G. Shekar, S.S. Manjunath, S.K. Venkatesh, and S. Srinivas played crucial roles in this successful move. The inscription now stands at the temple, where plans are underway to construct a pedestal and display board to further highlight its significance.

=== Summary of the Inscription ===
The inscription documents the donation of wetlands, likely for the benefit of the Singapura Tiruvengalanatha temple, now known as the Varadaraja Swamy temple. The donor was Nalapanayaka, a likely local official, who made the donation for the religious merit of Singapura Beteraya and Singapanayaka, also believed to be local officials. The inscription is written in colloquial Kannada and references patrabhoga, a religious service featuring cultural performances dedicated to a deity. While parts of the inscription are damaged, it reveals that a person named Thippayya received the donation. The Singapura Nalapanayaka inscription is significant because it suggests that Singapura is at least 500 years old and may have been named after Singappanayaka.

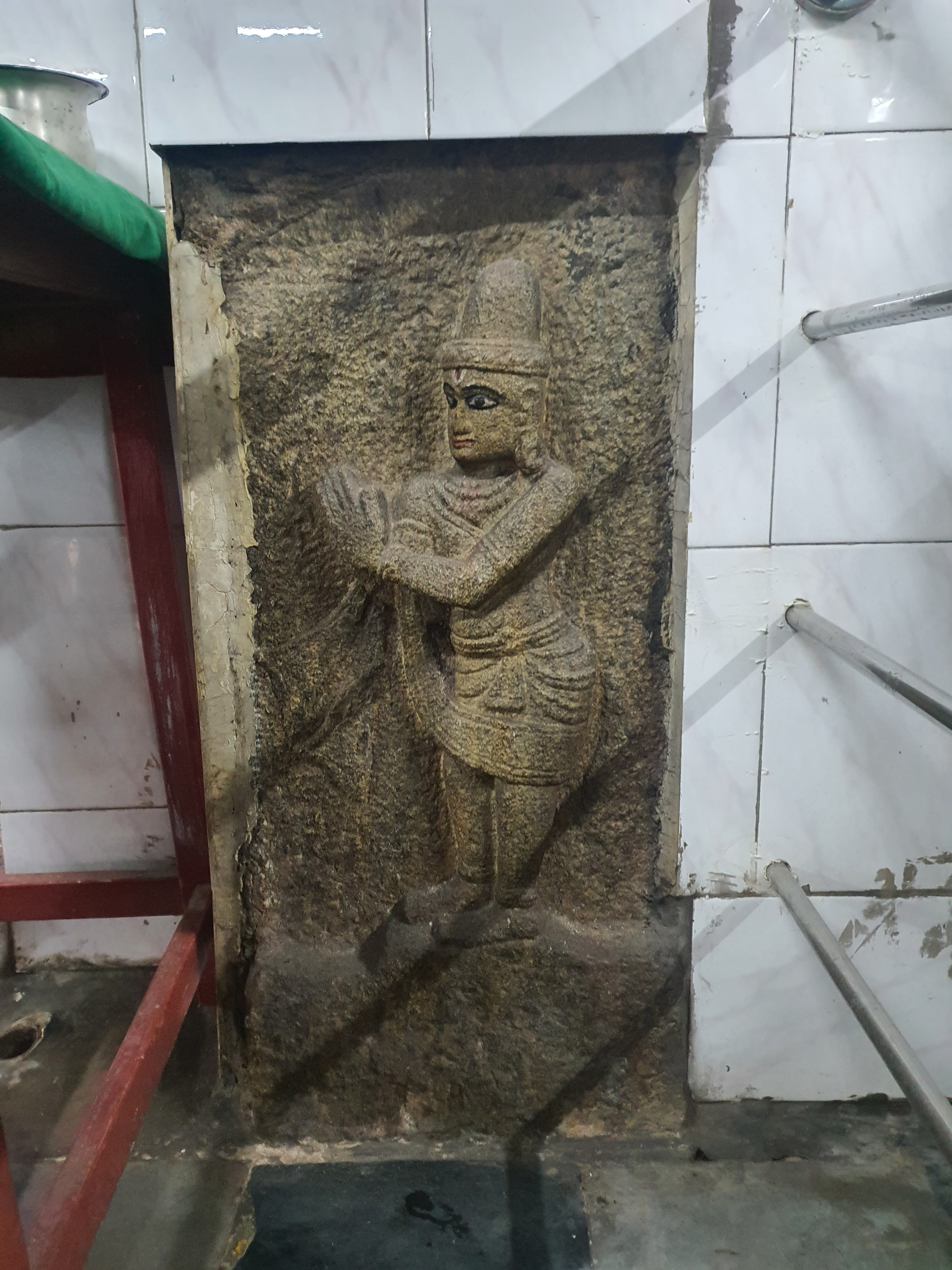
Sculpture of the Singappanayaka at the Varadaraja Swamy Temple in Singapura.

=== Transliteration of the Inscription ===
The inscription consists of 11 lines. Below is a transliteration of the text in both Kannada and IAST, as recorded by the Mythic Society-Bengaluru Inscription 3D Digital Conservation Project Team in their Bengaluru Itihasa Vaibhava- Singapura Edition.

	Kannada	IAST
1	ಮ . (ಘ) ಸಿ .	ma . (gha) si .
2	ಸರ್ವದಾರಿ ಶಂವತ್ಸ[ರ]	sarvadāri śaṃvatsa[ra]
3	ದ ಆಷಡ ಶು ೧	da āṣaḍa śu 1
4	ಲು ನಲಪನಾಯ್ಕ	lu nalapanāyka
5	ಸಿಂಗಾಪುರದ ಭೆ	siṃgāpurada bhĕ
6	ಟೆಯರಾಯಗೆ ಸಿ೦	ṭĕyarāyagĕ si0
7	ಗಪ್ಪನಾಯ್ಕರಿಗೆ	gappanāykarigĕ
8	ದರ್ಮವಾಗ ಭೆಕೆಂ	darmavāga bhĕkĕṃ
9	ದು ಪಾತ್ರಬೊಗಕೆ	du pātrabŏgakĕ
10	ತಿಪಯಗೆ ಕೊ . .	tipayagĕ kŏ . .
11	ವ ಗದೆ(ದ್ದೆ)ಗೆ . . ಅ(ಆ)	va gadĕ(ddĕ)gĕ . . a(ā)
12	ವನಾದರು . . .	vanādaru . . .

== Harohalli 1530CE Krishnappanayaka's Ramanujakoota Inscription ==
Harohalli 1530CE Krishnappanayaka's Ramanujakoota inscription
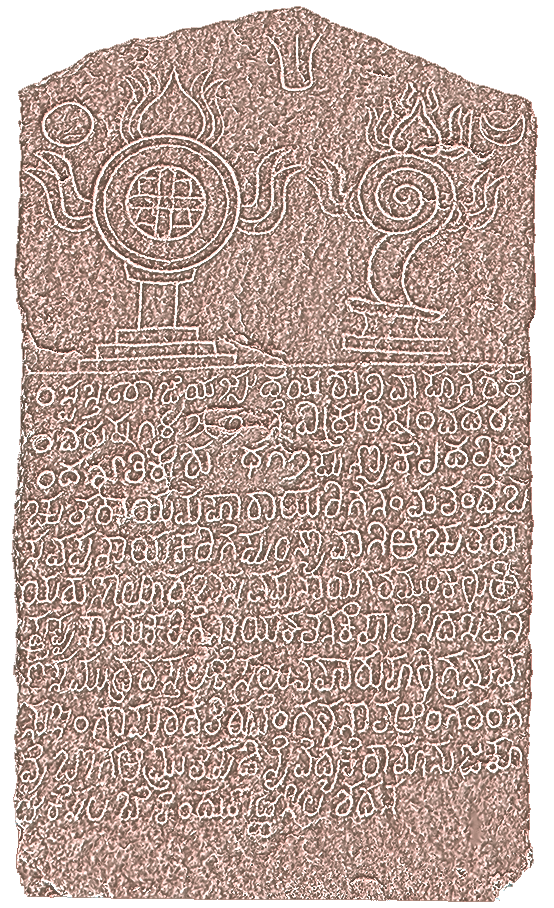
- 3D Scanned image of the Krishnappanayaka's Ramanujakoota inscription
- Material: Stone
- Height: 163 cm (64 in)
- Symbols: Shankha, Sudarshana Chakra
- Created: 1530 (496 years ago)
- Discovered: 1905; Varadaraja Swamy Temple, Singapura
- Present location: 13.0786225°N 77.537269°E
- Language: Kannada

=== Characteristics of the Inscription ===
The inscription is dated to 1530 CE and is carved on a locally sourced granite stone that measures 163 cm tall and 89 cm wide. The name Haruvahalli appears in this inscription dated to 1530 CE. The terms "Haruva," meaning Brahmins, and "halli," meaning village, provide conclusive evidence that the locality is over 495 years old. The inscription is located within the Anjaneya Swamy Temple complex in Harohalli.

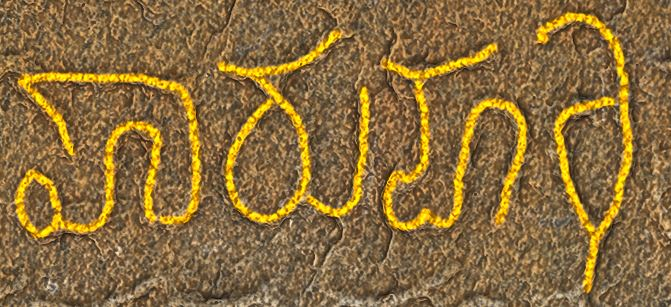
Digital Image of the Hāruhal̤i Obtained by 3D Scanning of The Harohalli 1530CE Krishnappanayaka's Ramanujakoota Inscription.

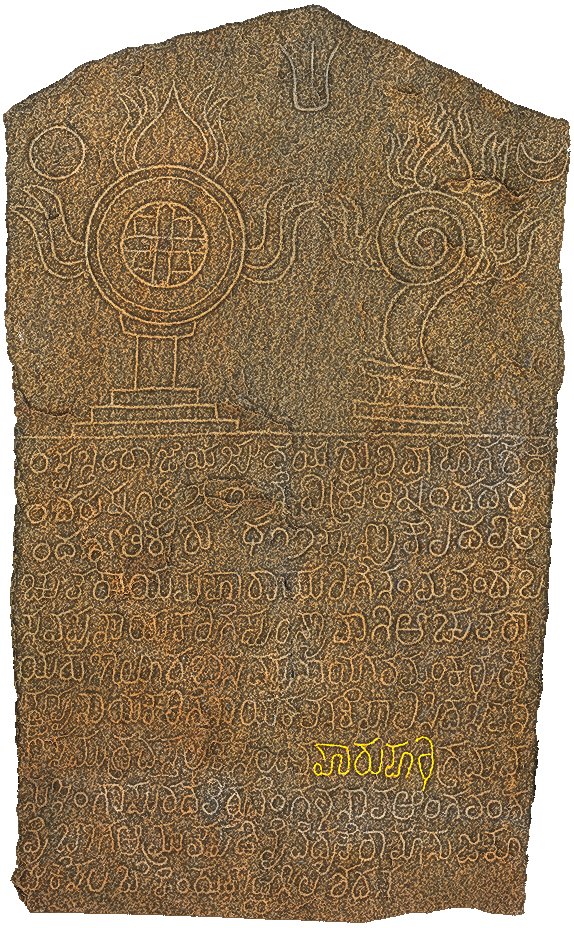
Digital Image Highlighting the Place Name 'Hāruhal̤i' in the Harohalli 1530CE Krishnappanayaka's Ramanujakoota Inscription.

This inscription is written in prominent characters in colloquial Kannada. However, considering its purpose as a record of a temple donation, the sculptor likely chose words and phrases that could be easily grasped by the local people. The text is likely intended to be easily understood by the local population. Its similarity to another Singapura-related inscription at nearby Chikkabettahalli suggests a potential shared origin, possibly from the same quarry and perhaps even the same sculptor. Interestingly, the Harohalli inscription, despite being inscribed six years later, lacks certain errors present in the Chikkabettahalli inscription, hinting at the sculptor's growing skill over time.

The inscription prominently features Sri Vaishnava holy marks, including the Shankha (conch shell), Chakra (discus), and the Naama, a vertical marking on the forehead that symbolizes Vaishnavism. These symbols are commonly found on 14th to 16th-century inscriptions, boundary stones, and Vishnu temples in the region. However, the Chakra depicted on the Harohalli inscription lacks spokes, suggesting the sculptor may have been a local stone worker unfamiliar with the Shilpa Shastras, the ancient texts that prescribe the rules for temple architecture and iconography. According to these texts, a chakra should be represented with 4, 8, 16, or another multiple of four spokes.

Other inscriptions in the Bengaluru region bearing Sri Vaishnava marks include those from Chikkabettahalli, Thindlu, Allalasandra, Domlur, Kothnur, Bannerughatta, Bommandahalli, Kadanur, Gantiganahalli, Kadiganahalli, Jodidasarahalli, Chikkajala, and Maranagere.

=== Discovery of the Inscription ===
The inscription is located within the Anjaneya Swamy Temple complex in Harohalli, approximately 7 kilometers northeast of Singapura. It was first documented by B.L. Rice in 1905 as Bengaluru inscription number 28 in Epigraphia Carnatica, Volume 9.

In 2017, the inscription was rediscovered, led by P.L. Udaya Kumar, an history enthusiast and the Hon. Director of The Mythic Society Bengaluru Inscriptions 3D Digital Conservation Project Team. Intrigued by its reference to the Tiruvengalanatha temple in Singapura, Udaya Kumar, along with several scholars and local residents, namely Mohan Nayak and S.V. Srinivas from Singapura visited the Harohalli inscription site to delve deeper into the history of Singapura and its surrounding areas.

Subsequently, The Mythic Society Bengaluru Inscriptions 3D Digital Conservation Project Team re-examined and 3D scanned the inscription, and their findings were published in the journal Bengaluru Itihaasa Vaibhava - Singapura Edition in November 2021.

Mohan Nayak and S.V. Srinivas have played a pivotal role in raising awareness about the inscription's content and historical significance within the community.

=== Summary of the Inscription ===
The inscription records a land grant made to the Singapura Tiruvengalanatha temple, now known as the Varadaraja Swamy temple, on 2 November 1530 CE. The date provided in the inscription, śaka varuṣa 1452 ne vikṛti ṣaṃvadarada khārtika śudha 12 puṇyakāladali, corresponds to 2 November 1530 CE. This was an auspicious day for Vaishnavites, as it was Uthana Dwadashi, the day of the Tulsi festival.

Krishnappanayaka, the chief of Sivanasamudra (another name for Hessaraghatta), donated the entire village of Harohalli to the Tiruvengalanatha Temple. This generous gift was intended to fund various temple activities, including:

- Anga-ranga-vaibhoga: Decoration of the temple deity and cultural performances like dance, music, and drama.
- Amrutapadi-naivedya: Special food offerings prepared for the deity.
- Ramanujakoota: A religious gathering and discourse.

The inscription indicates that the religious merit from this donation was meant to benefit both Achyutaraya, the reigning Vijayanagara emperor, and Krishnappanayaka's father, Solur Basavappanayaka, a prominent official from Solur, a town near Magadi.

The donation of an entire village to support the Ramanujakoota at the Singapura Tiruvengalanatha Temple highlights the significance of both the temple and the village of Singapura as religious centers during the period.

=== Transliteration of the inscription ===
The inscription consists of 11 lines. Below is a transliteration of the text in both Kannada and IAST, as recorded in Epigraphia Carnatica, Volume 9

IAST	Kannada
0 svasti śrī jĕyabhyudaya śālivāhana śaka	೦ ಸ್ವಸ್ತಿ ಶ್ರೀ ಜೆಯಭ್ಯುದಯ ಶಾಲಿವಾಹನ ಶಕ
0 varuṣa 1452 ne vikṛti ṣaṃvadara	೦ ವರುಷ ೧೪೫೨ ನೇ ವಿಕೃತಿ ಷಂವದರ
0 da khārtika śudha 12 puṇyakāladali ā	೦ ದ ಖಾರ್ತಿಕ ಶುಧ ೧೨ ಪುಣ್ಯಕಾಲದಲಿ ಆ
cutarāya mahārāyarigĕ naṃma taṃdĕ ba	ಚುತರಾಯ ಮಹಾರಾಯರಿಗೆ ನಂಮ ತಂದೆ ಬ
savappanāyakarigĕ puṃṇyavāgi ācutarā	ಸವಪ್ಪನಾಯಕರಿಗೆ ಪುಂಣ್ಯವಾಗಿ ಆಚುತರಾ
yaru solūra basavappanāyakara maṃkal̤u kri	ಯರು ಸೋಲೂರ ಬಸವಪ್ಪನಾಯಕರ ಮಂಕಳು ಕ್ರಿ
ṣtpṇappa nāyakarigĕ nāyakatanakĕ pālisida sivana	ಷ್ತ್ಪ್ಣಪ್ಪ ನಾಯಕರಿಗೆ ನಾಯಕತನಕೆ ಪಾಲಿಸಿದ ಸಿವನ
samudrada stalakĕ saluva hāruhal̤i gramava	ಸಮುದ್ರದ ಸ್ತಲಕೆ ಸಲುವ ಹಾರುಹಳಿ ಗ್ರಮವ
nu siṃgāpurada tiruvĕṃgal̤anāta āṃgaraṃga	ನು ಸಿಂಗಾಪುರದ ತಿರುವೆಂಗಳನಾತ ಆಂಗರಂಗ
vaibhoga āmṛtapaḍi naivedyakĕ rāmānujakū	ವೈಭೋಗ ಆಮೃತಪಡಿ ನೈವೇದ್ಯಕೆ ರಾಮಾನುಜಕೂ
ṭakĕ salabekĕṃdu kŏṭṭa sila śadana	ಟಕೆ ಸಲಬೇಕೆಂದು ಕೊಟ್ಟ ಸಿಲ ಶದನ

== Chikkabettahalli 1524CE Singappanayaka's Ramanujakoota inscription ==
Chikkabettahalli 1524CE Singappanayaka's Ramanujakoota inscription
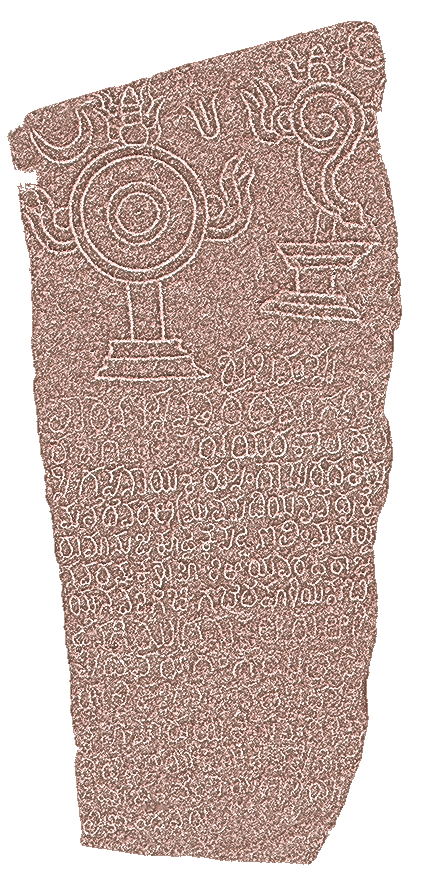
- 3D Scanned image of the Chikkabettahalli 1524CE Singappanayaka's Ramanujakoota inscription
- Material: Stone
- Height: 170 cm (67 in)
- Symbols: Sudarshana Chakra, Shankha
- Created: 1524 (502 years ago)
- Discovered: 1905; Anjaneya Swamy Temple, Chikkabettahalli, Bengaluru, India
- Present location: 13.08967°N 77.55332°E
- Language: Kannada

=== Characteristics of the Inscription ===
The name "Chikkabettahalli" is derived from "chikka betta" (small hill) and "halli" (village). In this inscription, it is mentioned in its colloquial form, "Chigabetahali," reflecting regional linguistic variations.

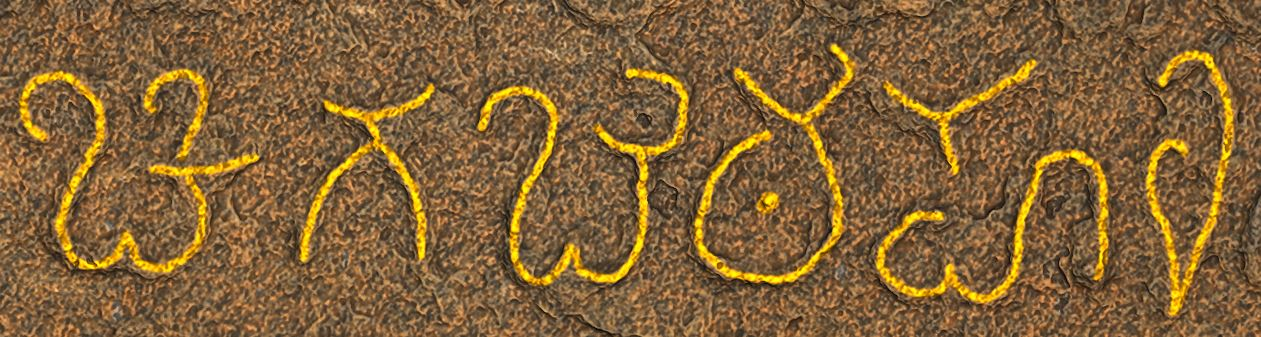
Digital Image of the Word Chikkabettahalli (cigabĕṭhahal̤i) Obtained by 3D Scanning of The Chikkabettahalli 1524CE Singappanayaka's Ramanujakoota Inscription.

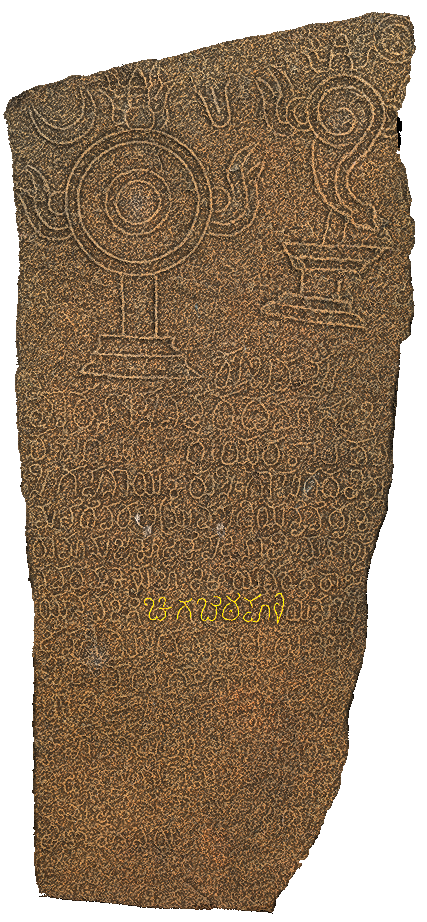
Digital Image Highlighting the Place Name 'Cigabĕṭhahal̤i' in the Chikkabettahalli 1524CE Singappanayaka's Ramanujakoota Inscription.

The inscription is currently housed in the Anjaneya Swamy Temple at Chikkabettahalli. According to local accounts, it was originally found in a ditch behind the temple and relocated to its present position approximately 20 years ago.

The inscription is carved on a granite slab measuring 170 cm in height and 74 cm in width. The front face, bearing the inscription, is smooth, while the sides and back remain rough and unfinished.

The top portion of the inscription stone features carvings of the sun and the moon, symbolizing the inscription's enduring nature. Alongside these celestial symbols are the Sri Vaishnava holy marks: the Shankha (conch shell), Chakra (discus), and Naama (vertical forehead marking). Notably, the Chakra in this inscription, like the one in the Harohalli inscription, lacks spokes.

=== Discovery of the Inscription ===
The inscription was first documented by B.L. Rice in 1905 as Bengaluru Inscription No. 19 in Epigraphia Carnatica, Volume 9. However, despite its historical significance, the inscription remained largely forgotten and neglected for over a century.

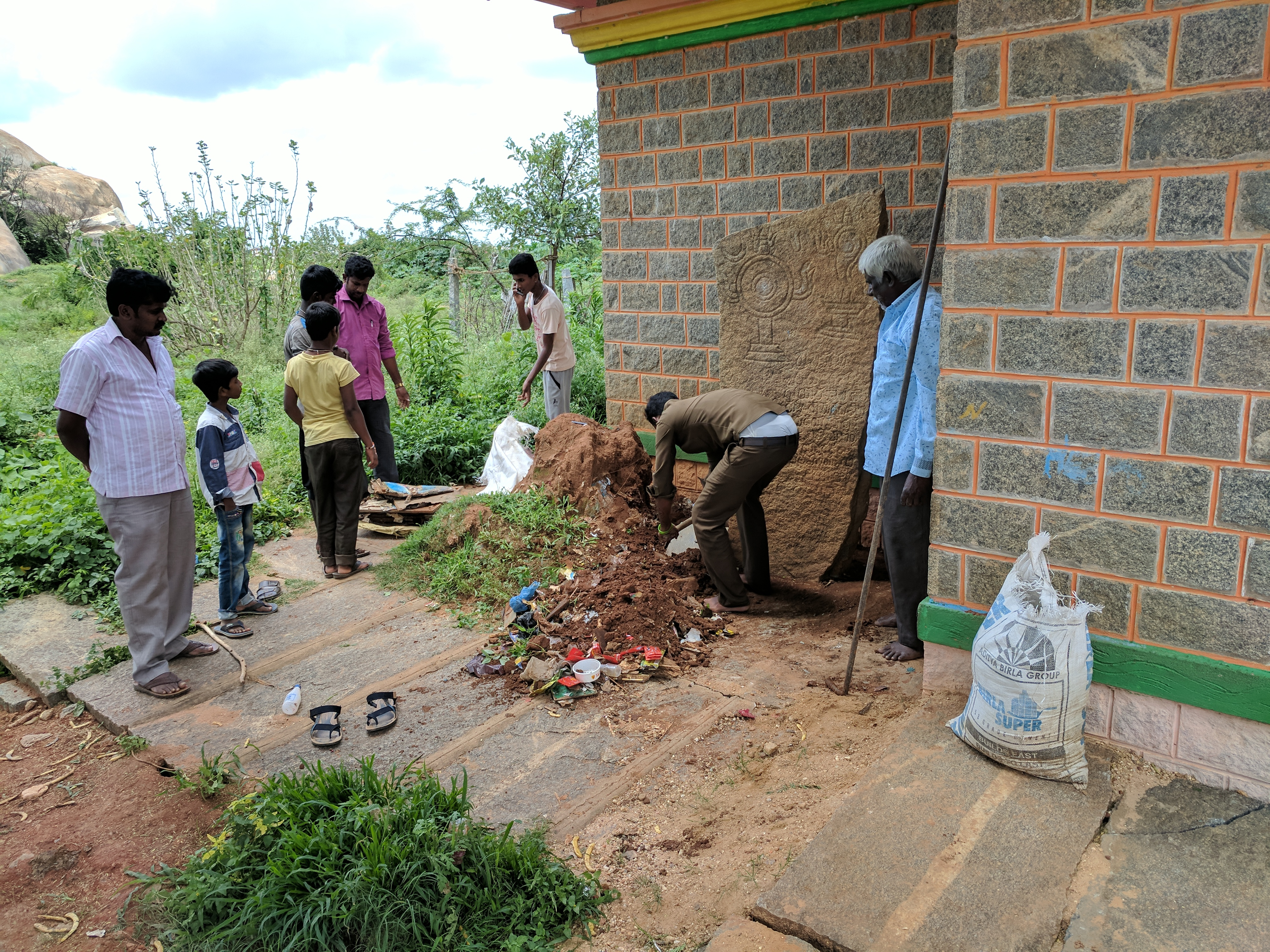
Cleaning of the Chikkabettahalli 1524CE Singappanayaka's Ramanujakoota inscription.

In December 2017, P.L. Udaya Kumar and Deccan Chronicle reporter Darshana Ramdev visited the inscription site to raise awareness about Bengaluru's inscriptions. They found the inscription in a deteriorated state behind the Anjaneya Swamy Temple in Chikkabettahalli, obscured by a large pile of refuse. Observing the inscription's condition, Udaya Kumar decided to take action. He approached a nearby group of young people and started a conversation, explaining the inscription's historical significance and emphasizing its connection to their village, Chikkabettahalli. Initially, the group expressed indifference, stating that they wouldn't be able to understand the inscription's content. Undeterred, Udaya Kumar challenged their apathy by reading aloud from a copy of Epigraphia Carnatica Volume 9, tracing the words on the stone as he read. His actions had a profound impact. Hearing their village's name and witnessing Udaya Kumar's enthusiasm sparked a change in the group's attitude. They became engaged and enthusiastic, recognizing the inscription's value to their community. Spontaneously, one of them obtained a vehicle, along with wheelbarrows, pickaxes, and shovels. Together, they cleaned the area around the inscription, removing the refuse for proper disposal

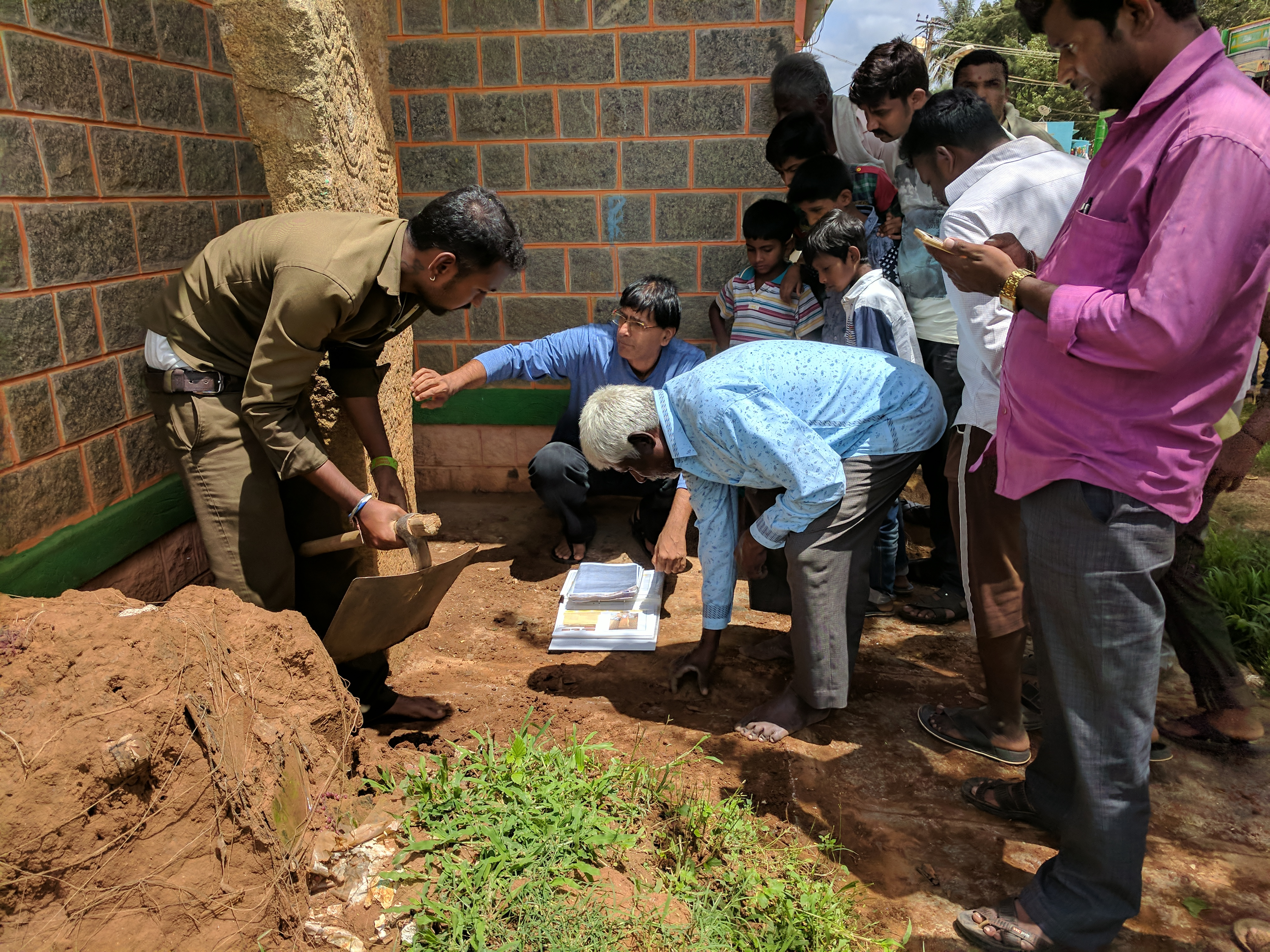
P L Udaya Kumar reading out the Chikkabettahalli 1524CE Singappanayaka's Ramanujakoota Inscription to the Local Residents.

The rediscovery and cleaning of the Chikkabettahalli inscription exemplify the power of community involvement in heritage preservation. Once neglected, the inscription is now protected by the residents of Chikkabettahalli, thanks to the efforts of individuals who recognized its value and inspired others to care.

=== Summary of the Inscription ===
The inscription records Singapanayaka's donation of the entire village of Chikkabettahalli to the deity Tiruvengalanatha at Tirumala in Singapura. This generous gift was intended to fund the amrutapadi-naivedya (special food offerings) and support the activities of the Ramanujakoota (a religious gathering and discourse) at the temple.

Hiriya Varadarajaiah, son of Pattana Thimanayya, was the grantee of the donation and was responsible for managing the Ramanujakoota at the Tiruvengalanatha temple.

The inscription was created during the reign of Krishnadevaraya, the king of the Vijayanagara Empire, and is considered unique for recording the donation of an entire village, a privilege typically reserved for royalty or high-ranking officials.

Additionally, the inscription includes two curse phrases intended to protect the donation and the inscription itself. One curse equates stealing the donation to the sin of killing a holy cow on the banks of the Ganges, while the other compares it to the sin of killing one’s parents.

=== Transliteration of the Inscription ===
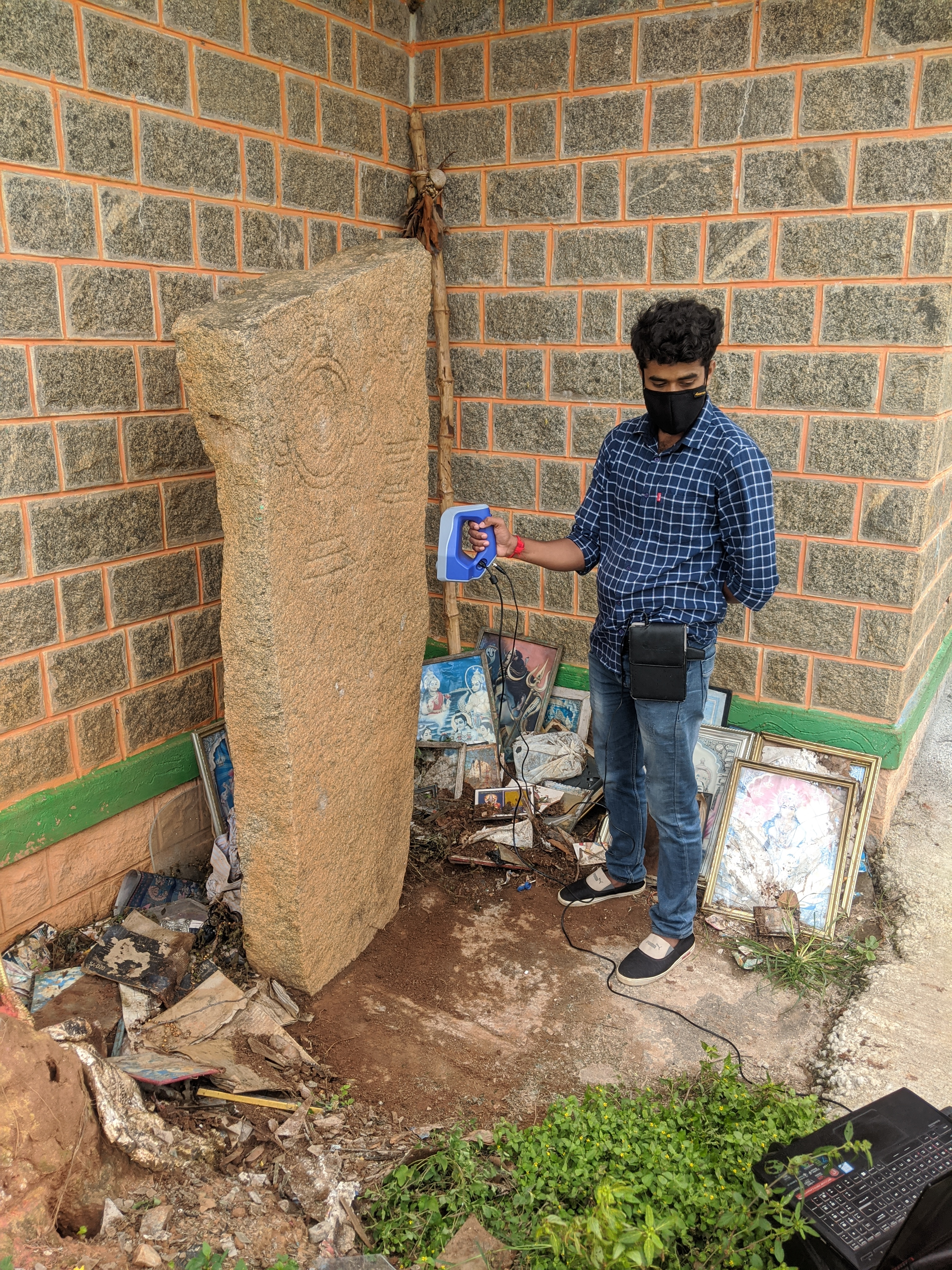
3D Scanning of the Chikkabettahalli 1524CE Singappanayaka's Ramanujakoota inscription.

The inscription consists of 15 lines. Below is a transliteration of the text in both Kannada and IAST, as recorded in Epigraphia Carnatica, Volume 9

Kannada	IAST
ಶುಭಮಸ್ತು	śubhamastu
ತಾರಣ ಸ೦ವತ್ಸರದ ಮಾರ್ಗಷಿ	tāraṇa samvatsarada mārgaṣi
ರ ಶು ೧ ಲು ಕ್ರಿಷ್ಣರಾಯರ ಕಾಲದಲಿ	ra śu 1 lu kriṣṇarāyara kāladali
ಸಿಂಗಪನಾಯಕರು ಸಿಂಗಾಪುರದ ತಿರು	siṃgapanāyakaru siṃgāpurada tiru
ಮಲೆದೇವರ ಅಮ್ರುತಪಡಿಯ ನೈವೇದ್ಯಕ್ಕೆ	malĕdevara amrutapaḍiya naivedyakkĕ
ರಾಮಾನುಜಕೂಟ್ಟಕ್ಕೆ ಪಟ್ಟಣ ತಿಂಮ್ಮಣಯ್ಯ	rāmānujakūṭṭakkĕ paṭṭaṇa tiṃmmaṇayya
ನವರ ಮಕ್ಕಳು ಹಿರಿಆಯ ವರದರಾಜ	navara makkal̤u hiriāya varadarāja
ಯನವರಿಗೆ ಚಿಗಬೆಠಹಳಿಯನು ಬಿ	yanavarigĕ cigabĕṭhahal̤iyanu bi
ಟೆವಗಿ ಯಿ ಧರ್ಮಕ್ಕೆ ಆರು ಆಳಿ	ṭĕvagi yi dharmakkĕ āru āl̤i
ಪಿದವರು ಗಂಗೆಯ ತಡಿ	pidavaru gaṃgĕya taḍi
ಯಲ್ಲಿ ಕಪಿಲೆಯ ವದಿಸಿದ ಪಪ	yalli kapilĕya vadisida papa
ಕ್ಕೆ ಹೋಹರು ಯಿ ತಿರುವೆಂಗಳನಾ	kkĕ hoharu yi tiruvĕṃgal̤anā
ತ ದಾನದ ಯಿ ಧರ್ಮಕ್ಕೆ ತಪಿದೋರು	ta dānada yi dharmakkĕ tapidoru
ತಂಮ ತಂದೆ ತಾಯ ಕಾಶಿಯ	taṃma taṃdĕ tāya kāśiya
ಲಿ ಕೊಂದವರು	li kŏṃdavaru

== Gallery ==
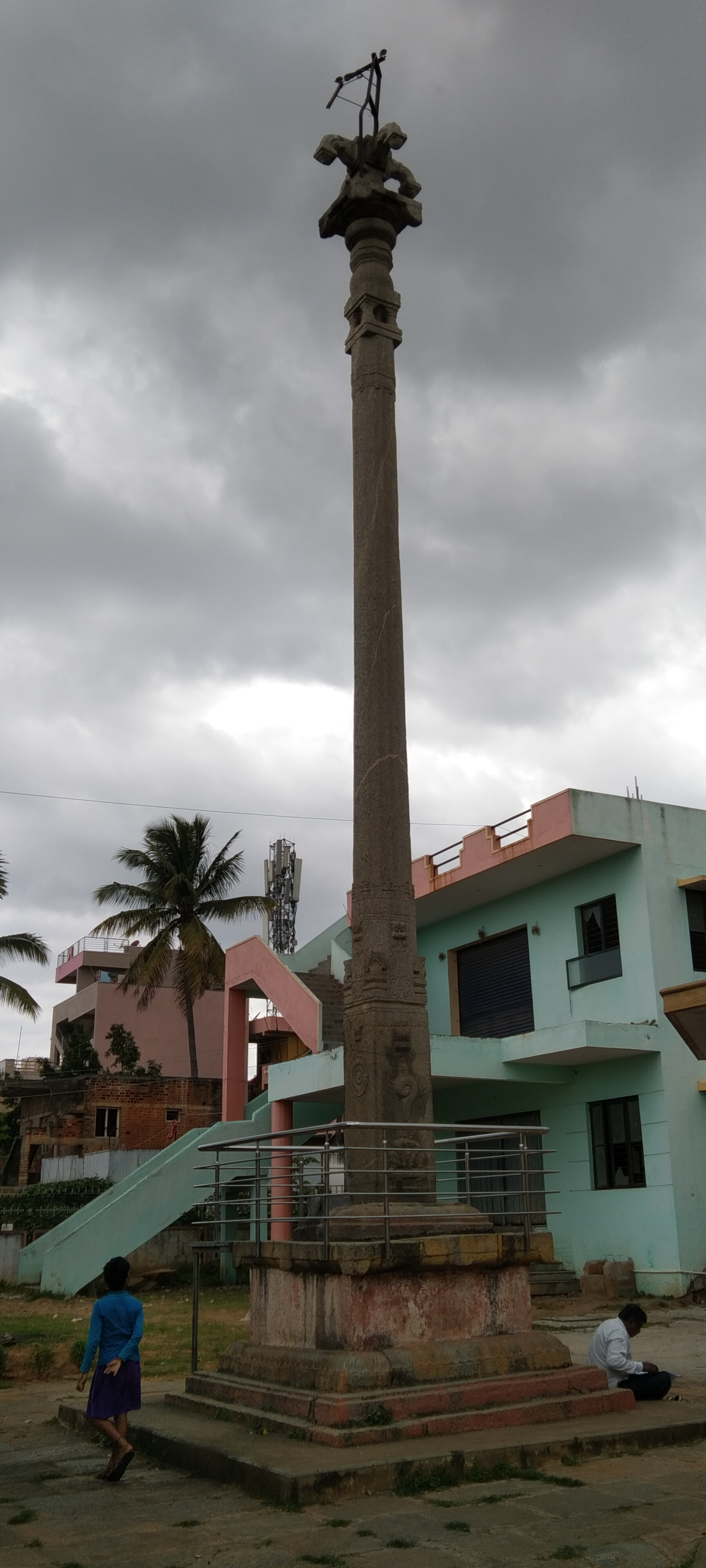
View of the Garudakamba at the Varadaraja Swamy Temple in Singapura

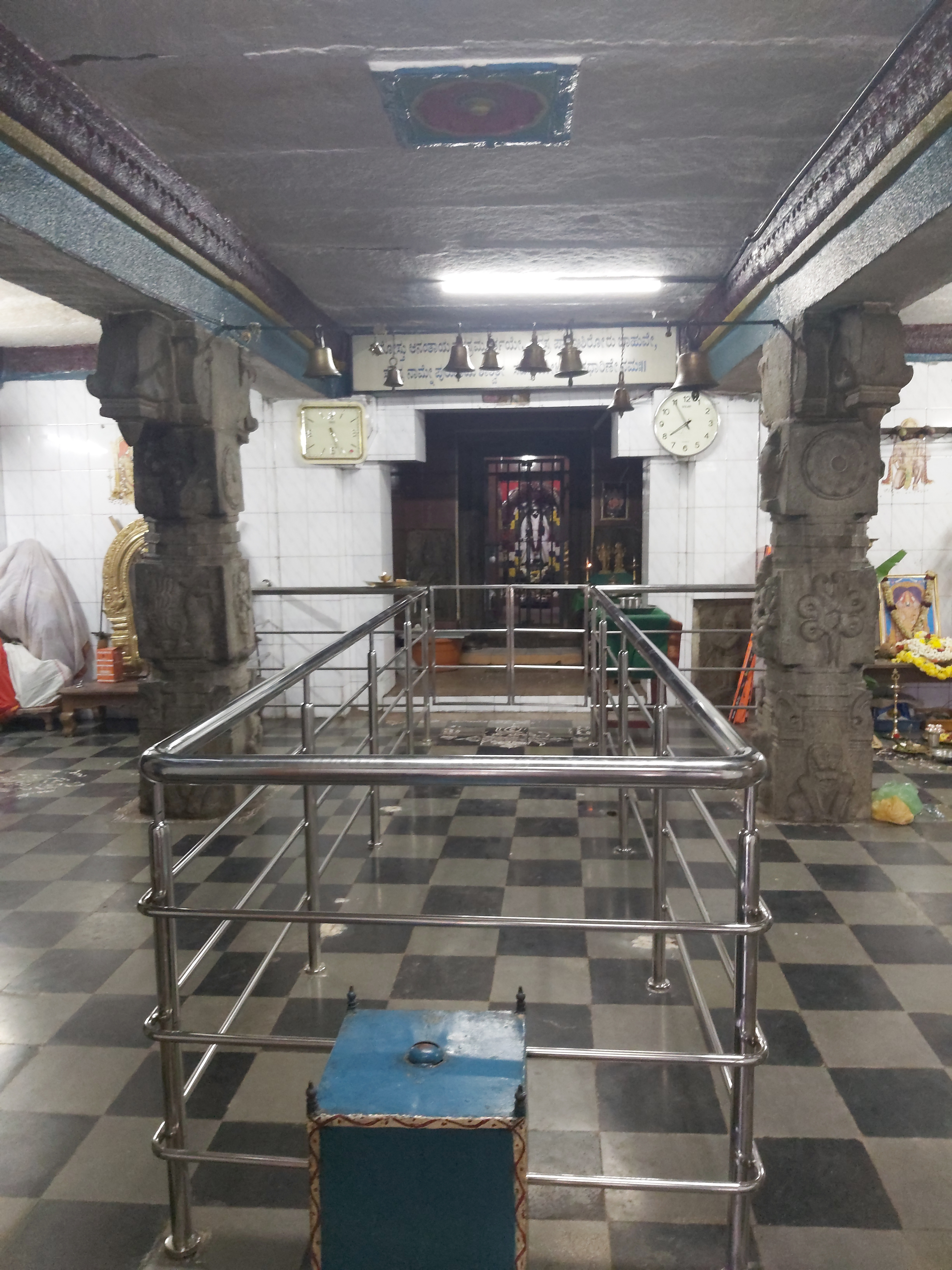
Inside View of the Varadaraja Swamy temple in Singapura

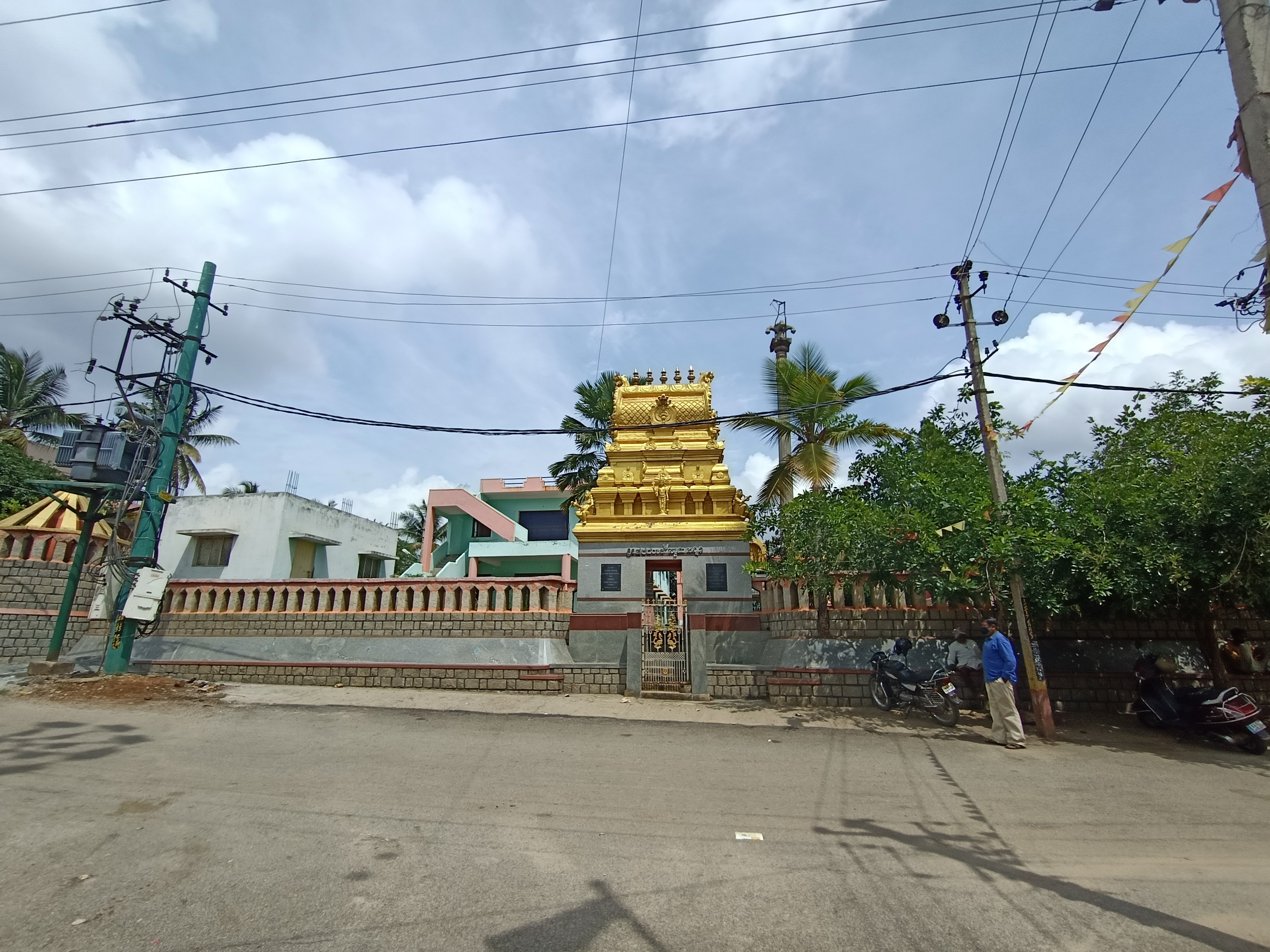
Wide Angle View Photograph of the Varadaraja Swamy Temple in Singapura

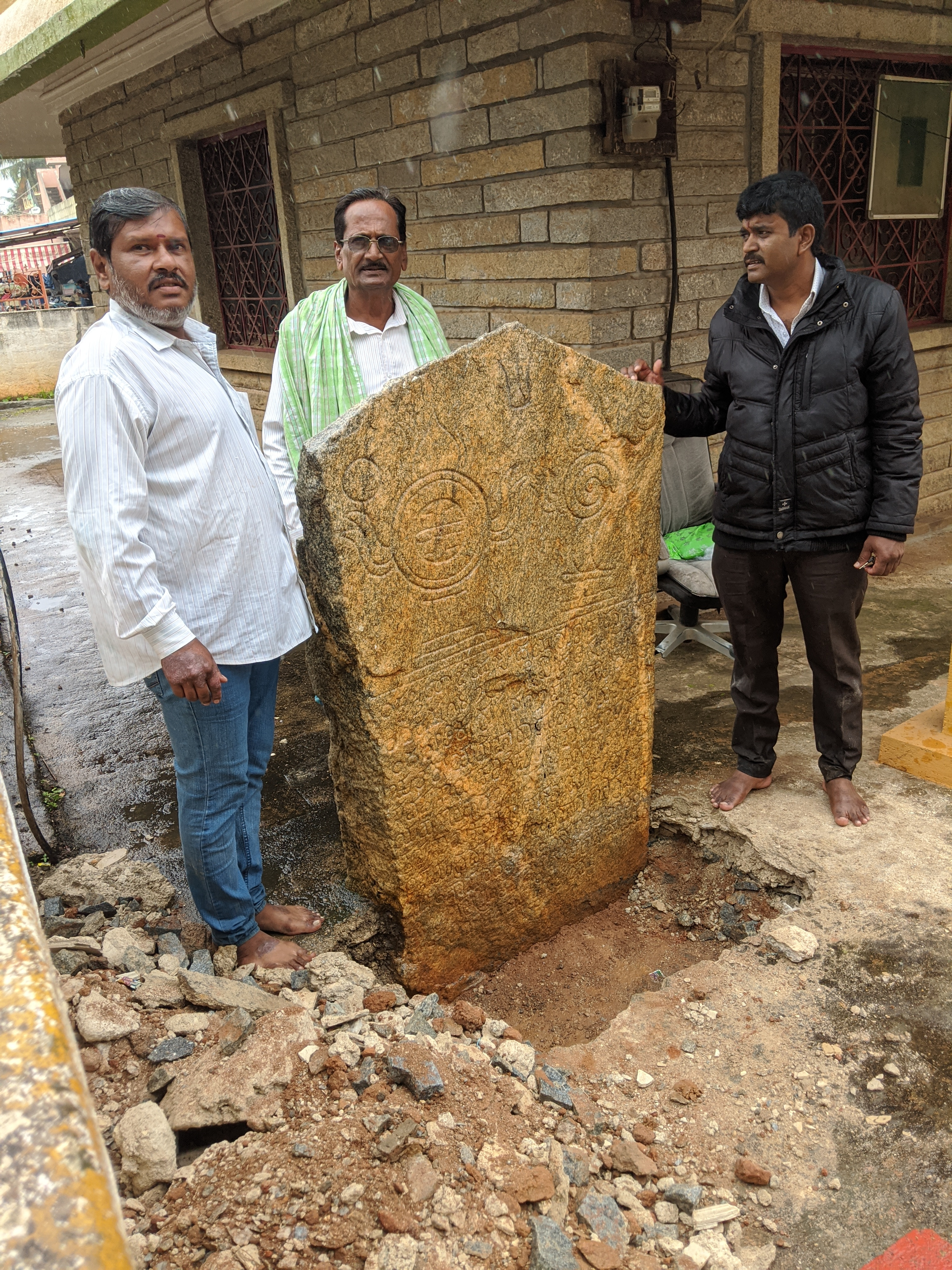
Local Residents with the Harohalli 1530CE Krishnappanayaka's Ramanujakoota Inscription

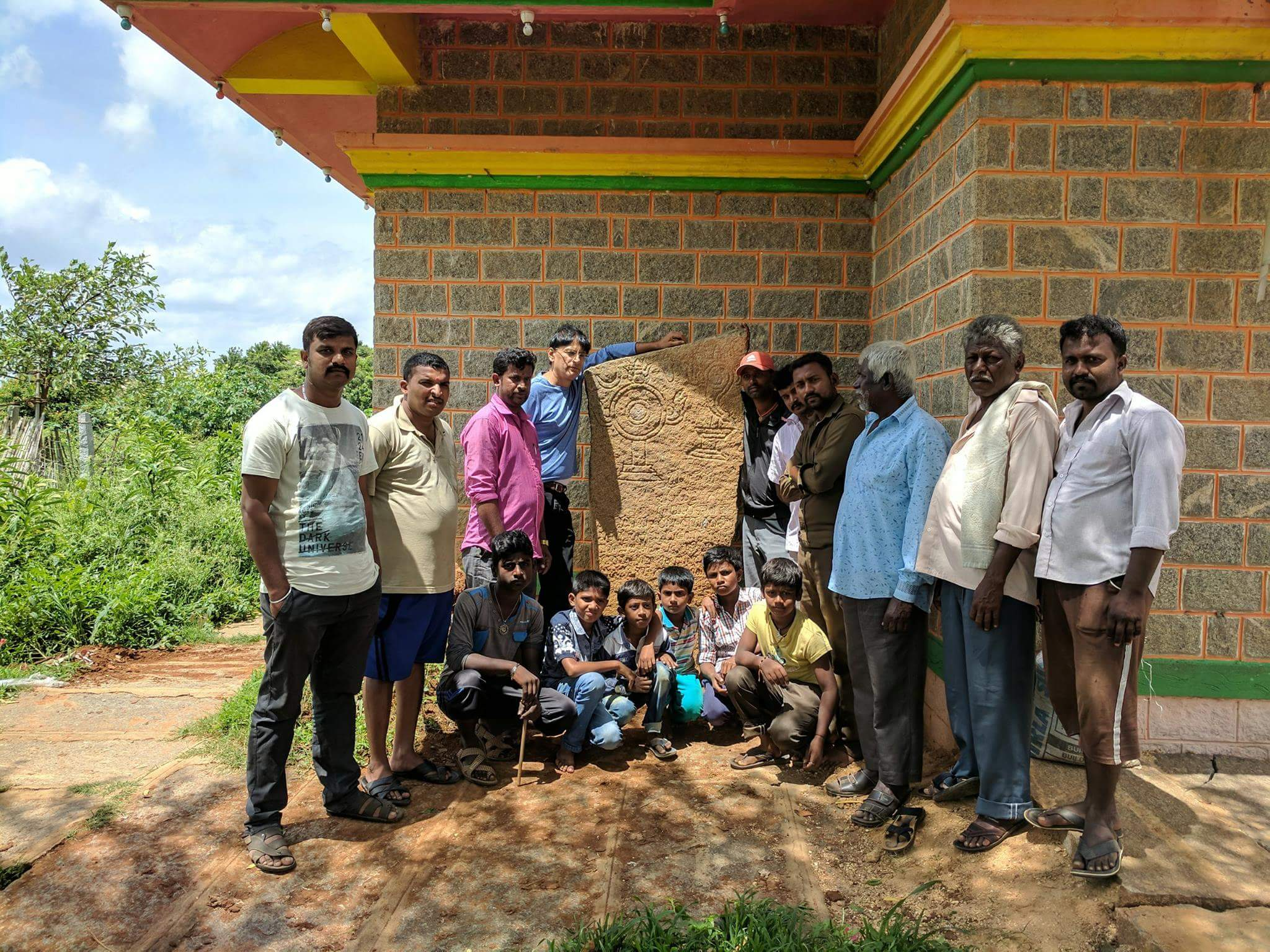
Local Residents with the Local Residents with the Chikkabettahalli 1524CE Singappanayaka's Ramanujakoota inscription

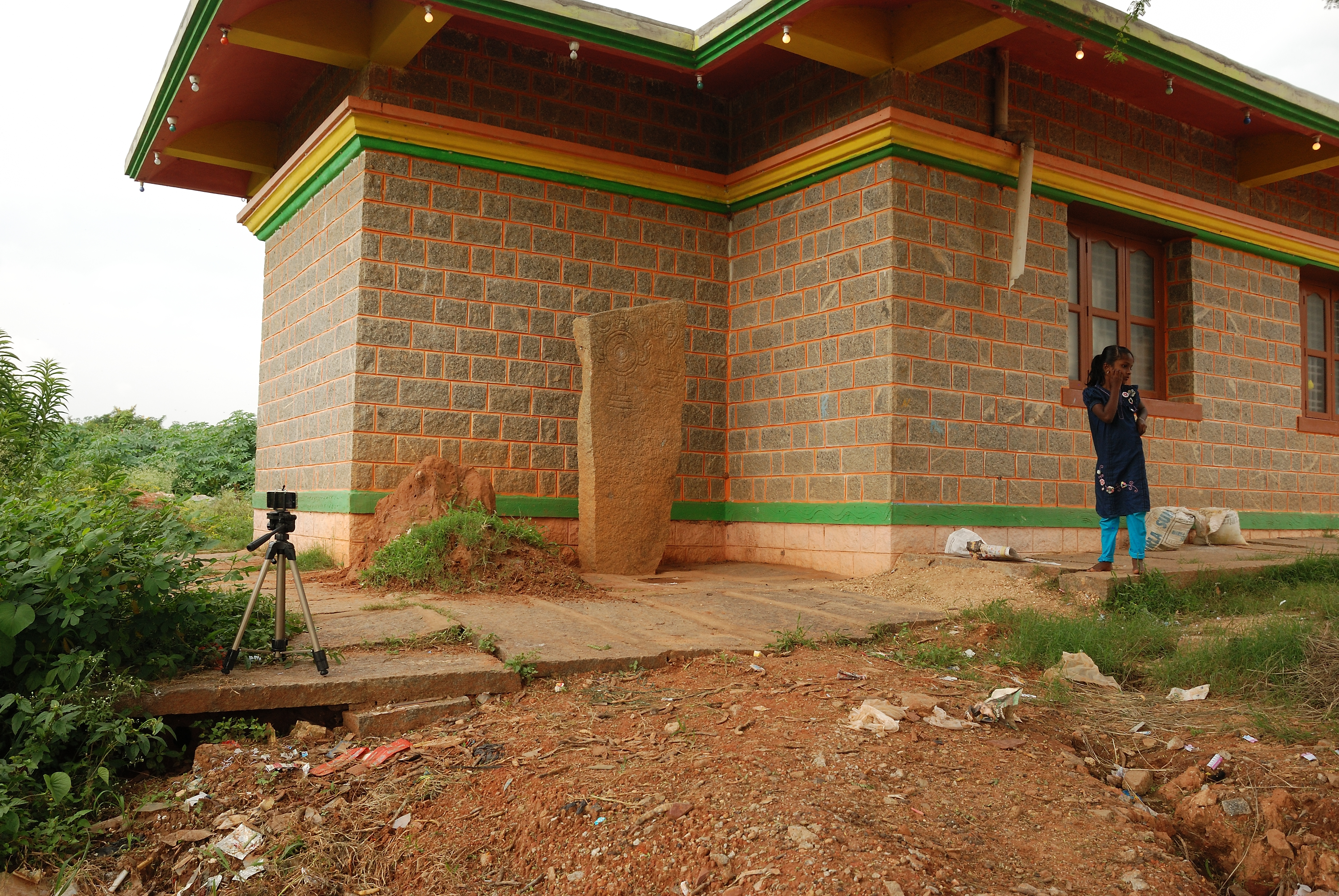
Wide Angle View of the Chikkabettahalli 1524CE Singappanayaka's Ramanujakoota inscription

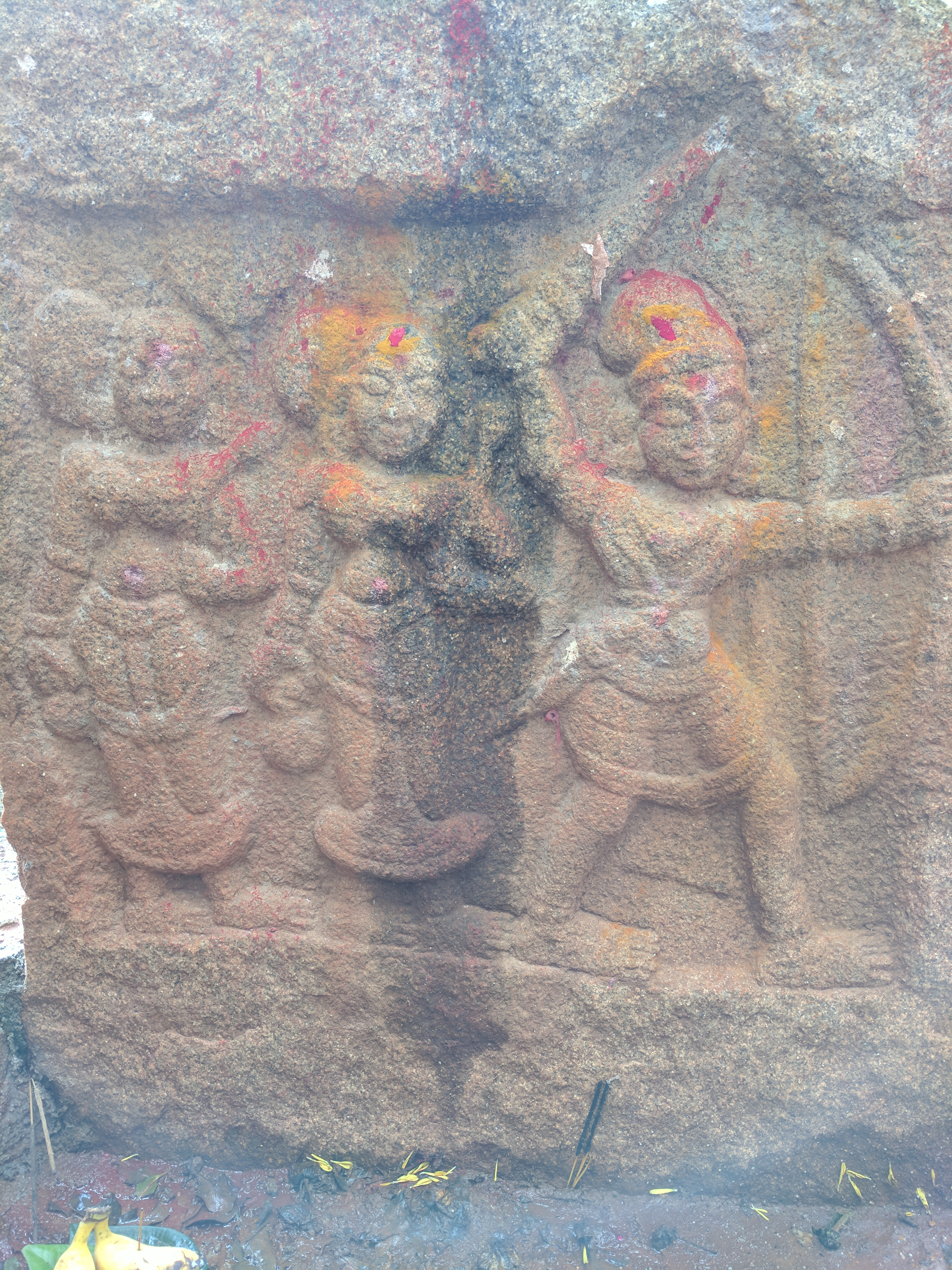
Veeramasti Memorial Stone dating to c.15-16th Century at Harohalli

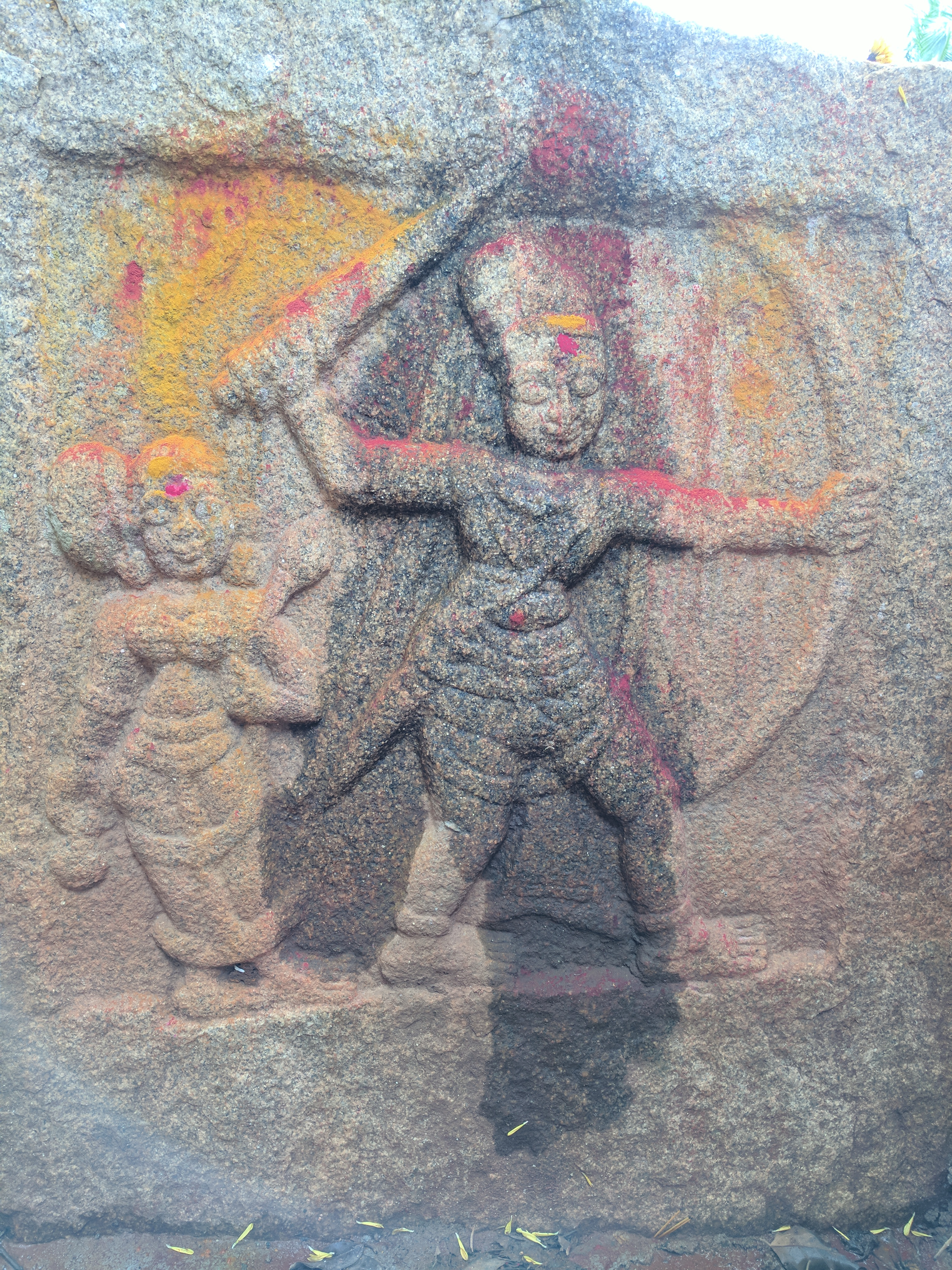
Veeramasti Memorial Stone dating to c.15-16th Century at Harohalli

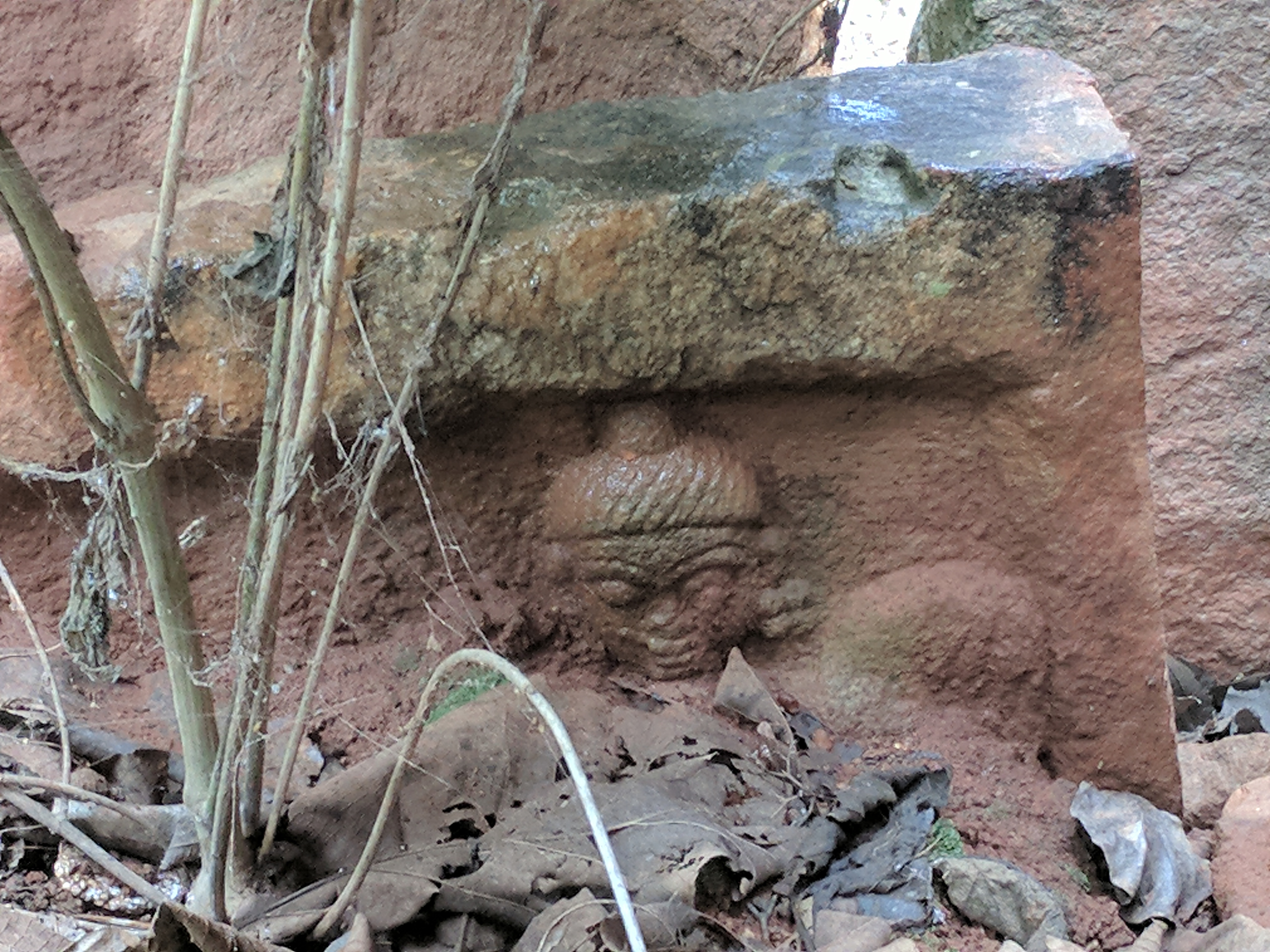
A Memorial Stone at Harohalli dating to c.15-16th Century

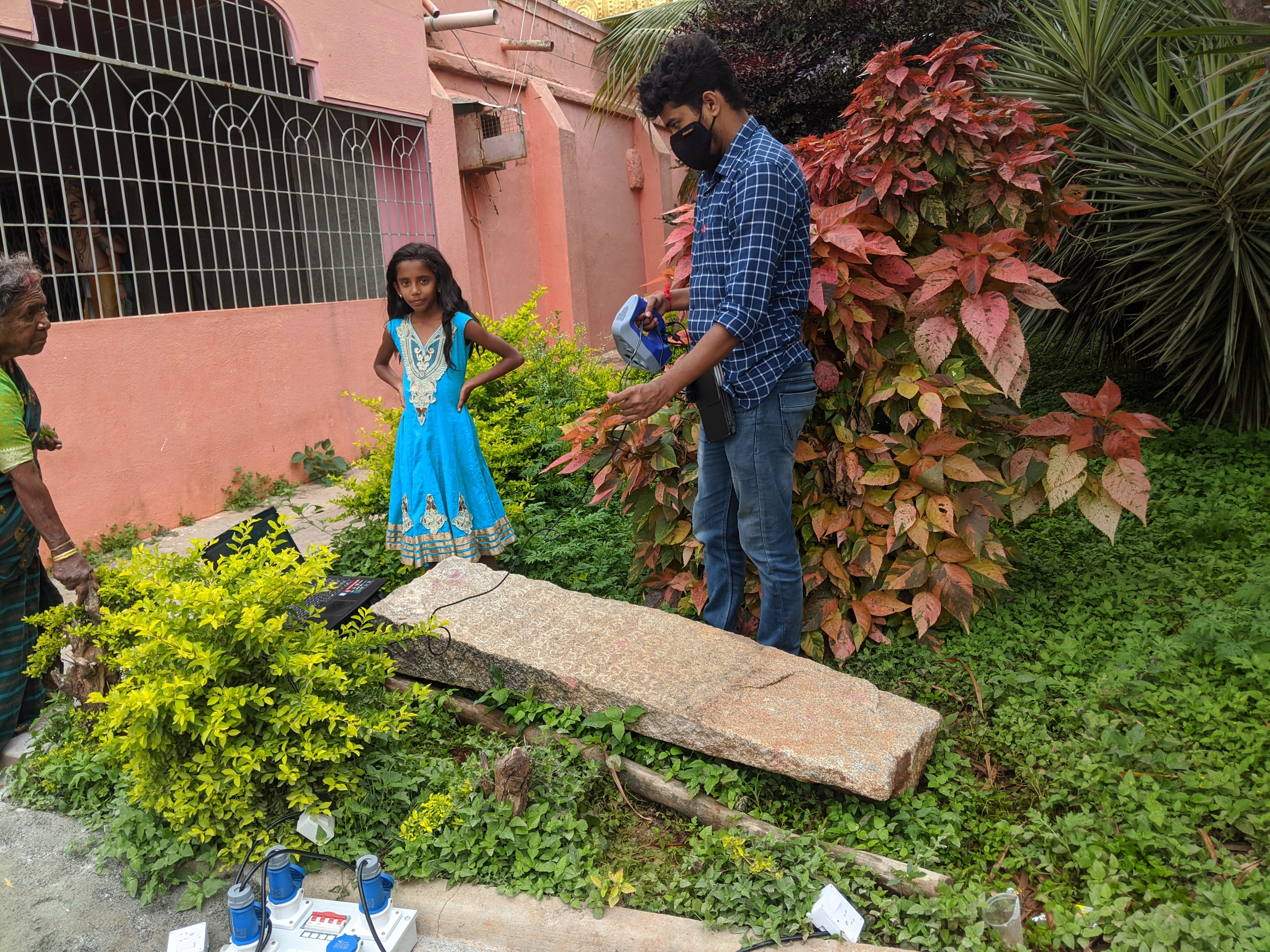
3D Scanning of the Singapura 1528CE Singappanayaka's Ramanujakoota Inscription

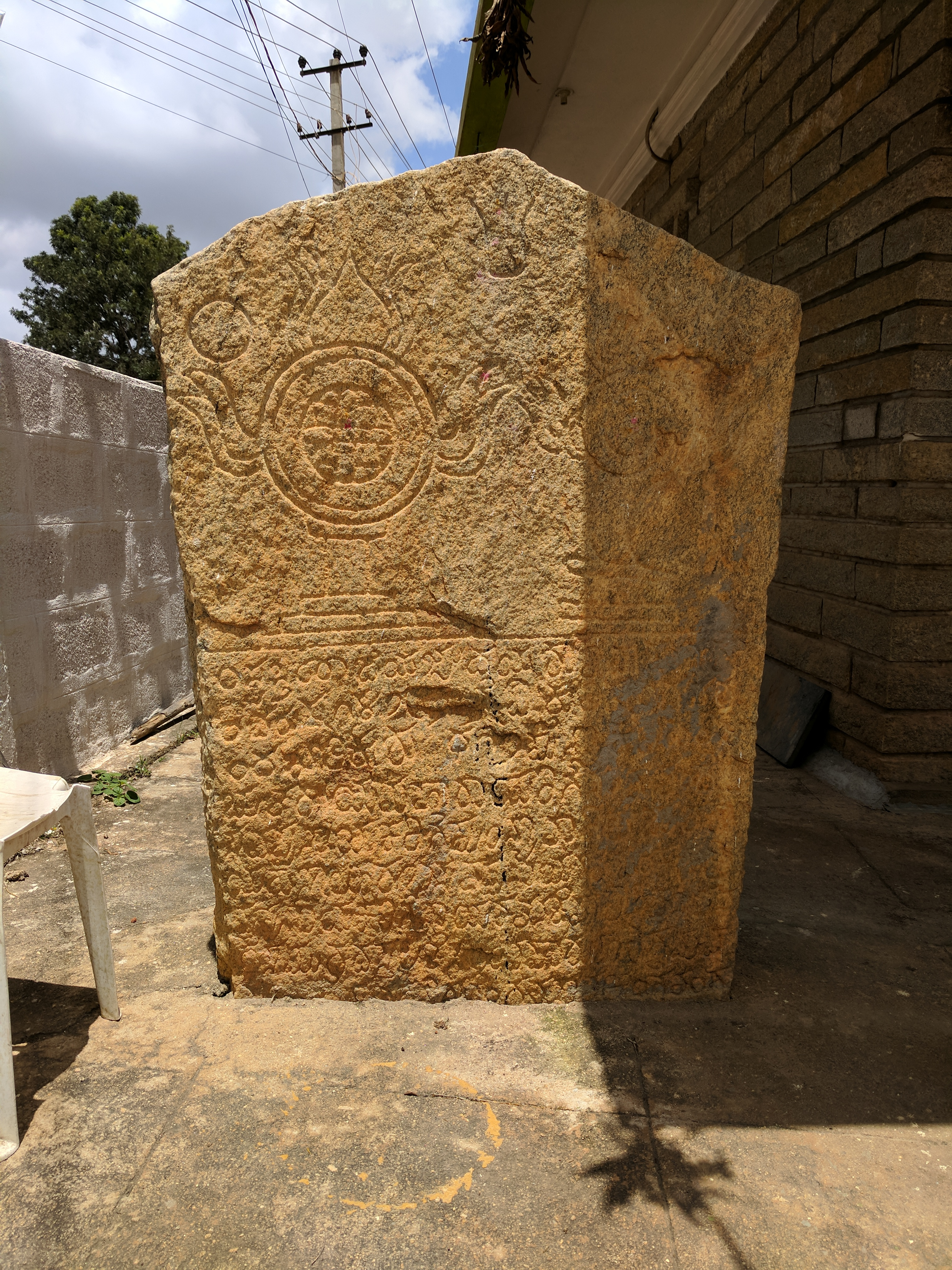
Harohalli 1530CE Krishnappanayaka's Ramanujakoota inscription

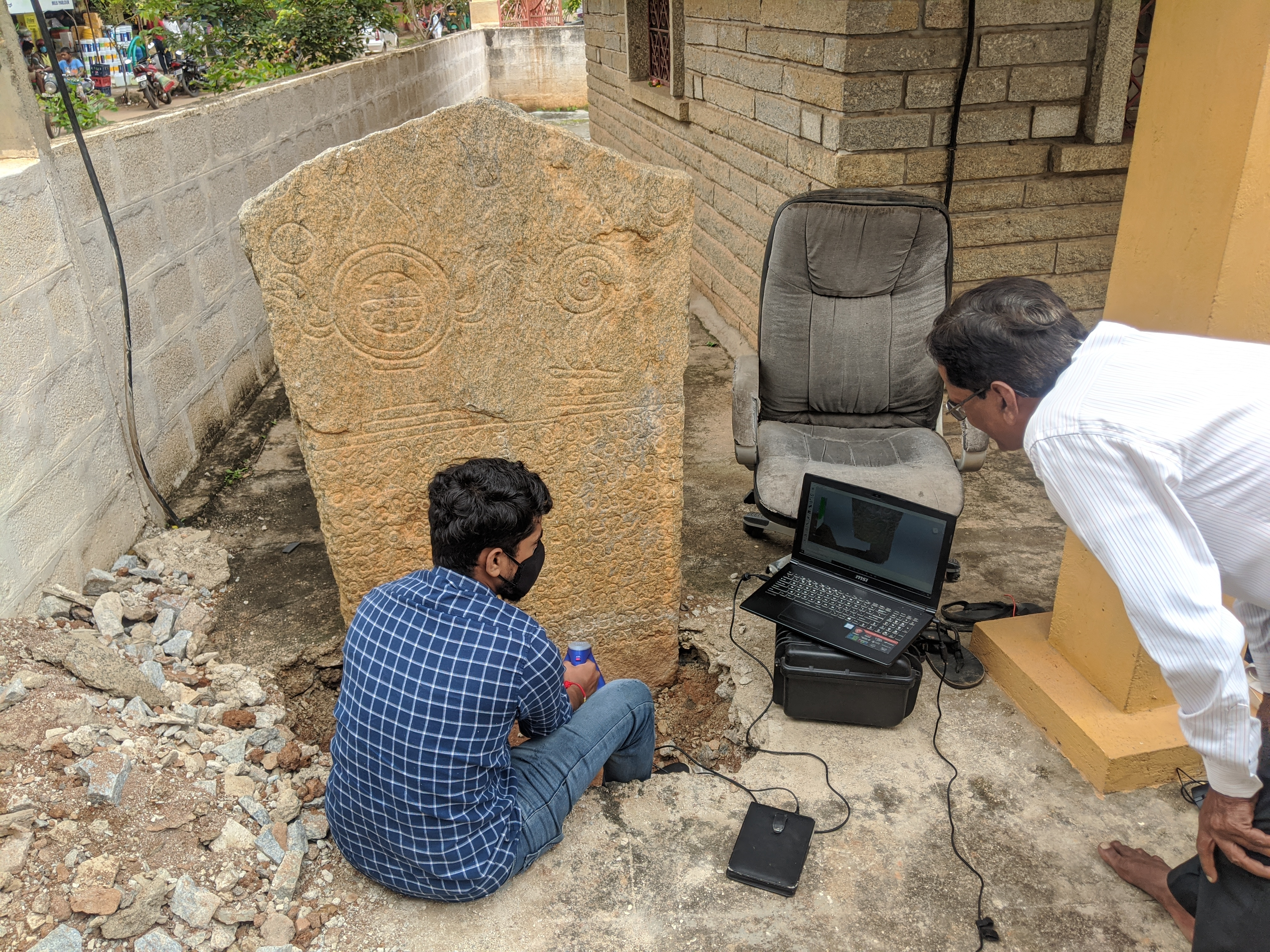
3D scanning of the Harohalli 1530CE Krishnappanayaka's Ramanujakoota Inscription

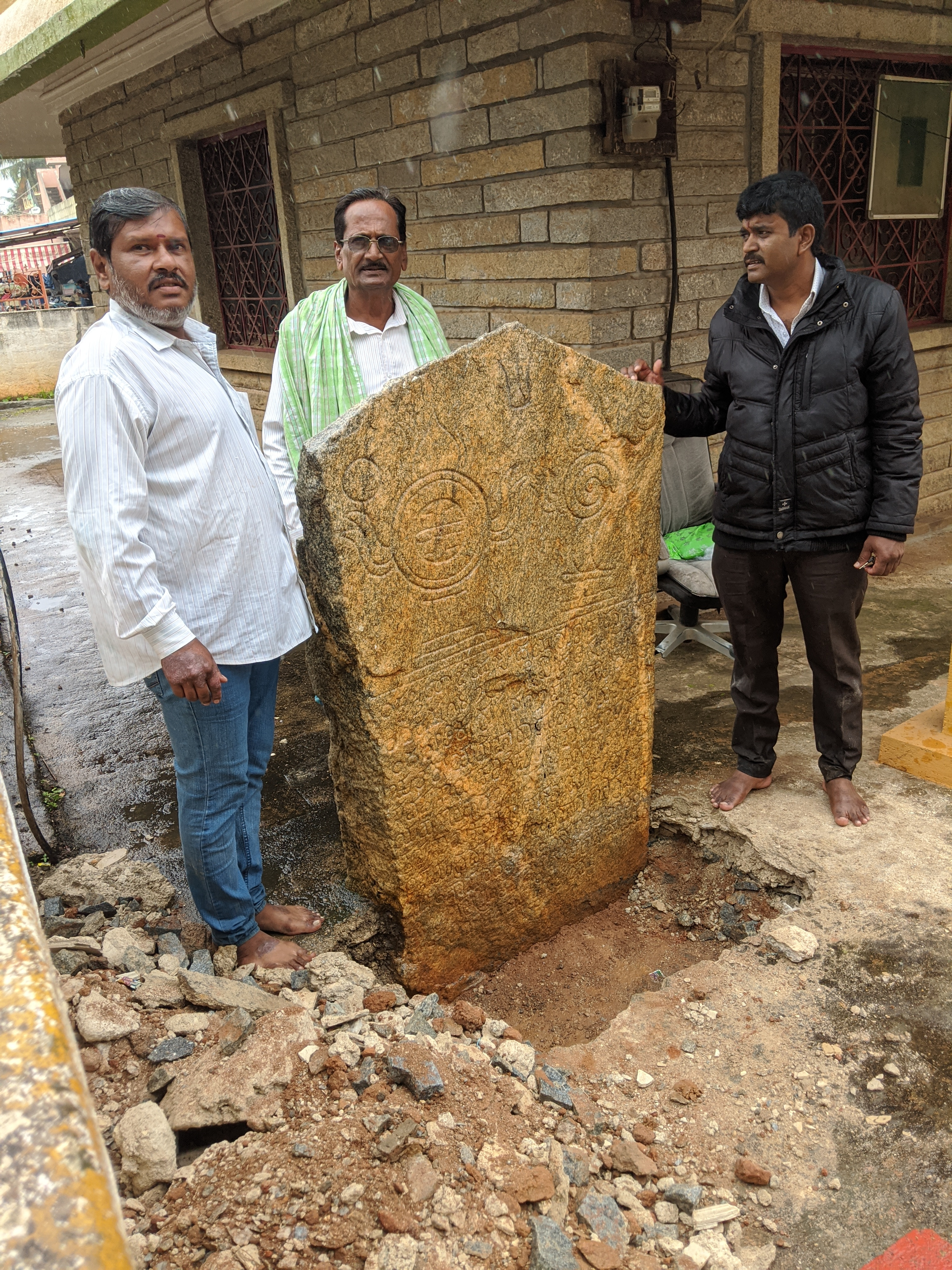
Local Residents with the Harohalli 1530CE Krishnappanayaka's Ramanujakoota inscription

== See also ==
- Inscription Stones of Bengaluru
- Vijayanagara Empire
- Kannada inscriptions
- History of Bangalore
- Indian inscriptions
