= Allalasandra inscriptions and hero stones =

Allalasandra is a historic locality in North Bengaluru, situated adjacent to the Gandhi Krishi Vigyan Kendra (GKVK) campus on Bellary Road. The name Allalasandra is mentioned in an inscription dated to 1544 CE, tracing its historicity back about 500 years. The inscription records the donation of the entire village of Allalasandra to the Allalanatha temple at Jakkur.

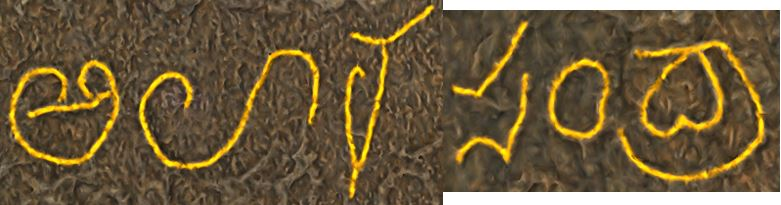
Digital Image of a place name Alāl̤asaṃdrā obtained by 3D Scanning of The Allalasandra 1544CE Rachura Narasapaya Inscription.

The earliest map of Allalasandra is a 1905CE state land records map which shows the village and adjoining areas being of 2.47sq km, 7.78 km perimeter. The village is shown bounded by Yelahanka kasaba, Shivanahalli, Jakkur Plantation, Bytrayanapura, Kothi Hosahalli, Kodigehalli, Kodigehalli Plantation and Chikka Bommasandra villages. Today the same area has been apportioned between Allalasandra village, GKVK campus, upmarket Judicial Layout and some portions of Bellary road.

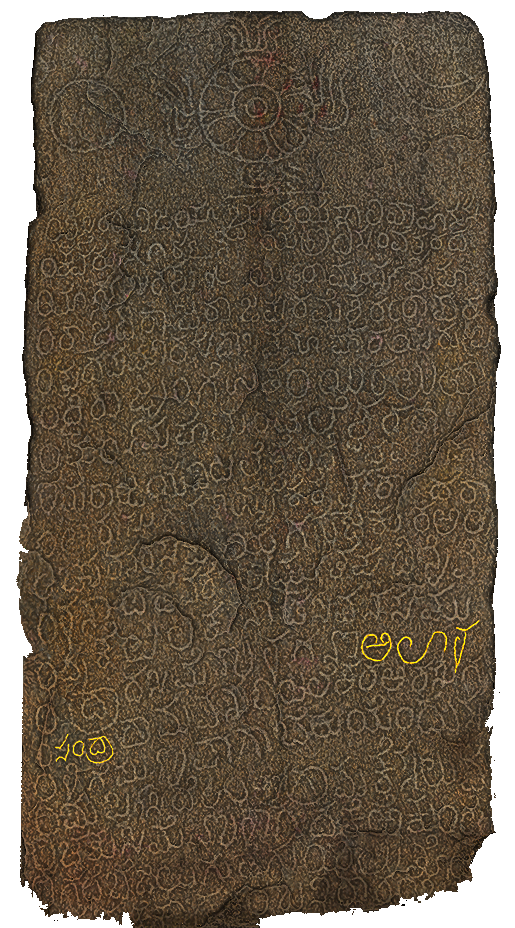
Digital Image Highlighting the Place Name 'Alāl̤asaṃdrā' in the Allalasandra 1544 CE Rachur Narsappaiah Donation Inscription.

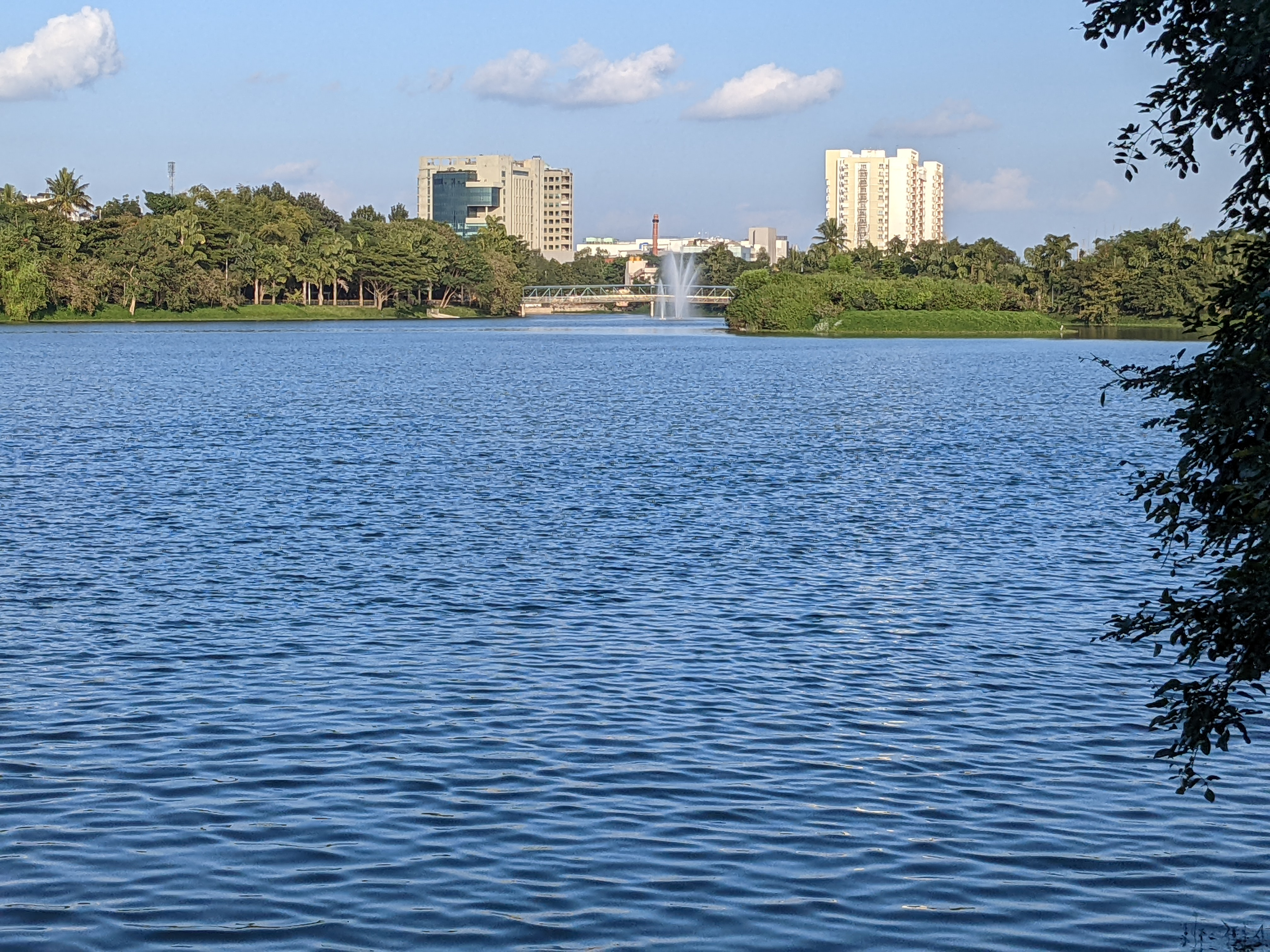
Allalasandra Lake.

Four inscriptions were documented in this locality spanning from the 11th century to the 18th-19th century CE, of which only two are physically present, the status of the rest two remains unknown.

== Allalasandra 1544 CE Rachur Narasappiah's Donation Inscription ==
Allalasandra 1544 CE Rachur Narasappiah's Donation Inscription
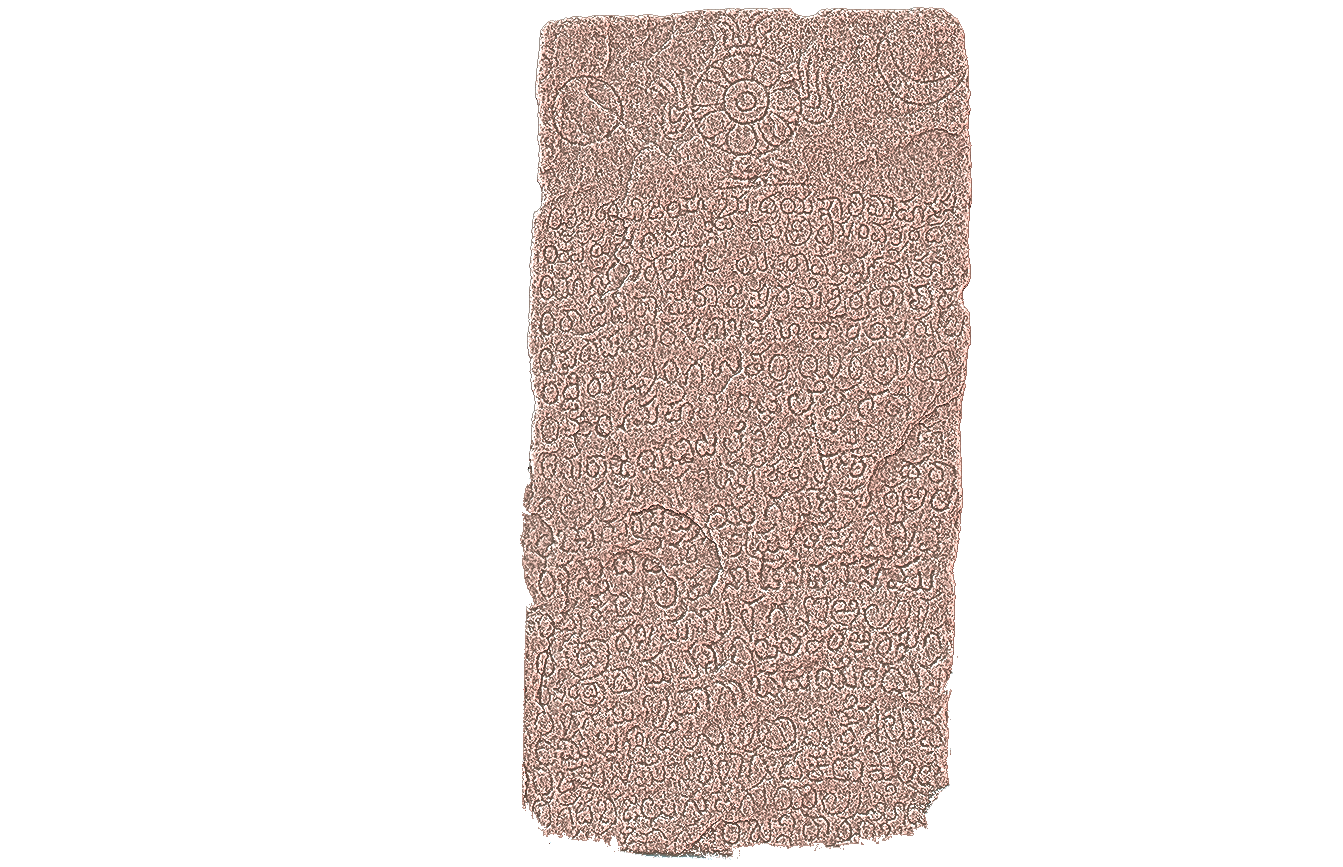
- 3D scanned image of the inscription by Mythic Society, Bengaluru
- Material: Stone
- Height: 133 cm (52 in)
- Width: 67 cm (26 in)
- Symbols: Sun, Moon, Sudarshana Chakra
- Created: 19 November 1544 (480 years ago)
- Discovered: 1905; Allalasandra, Bengaluru, Karnataka
- Present location: 13.0865769°N 77.5875828°E
- Language: Kannada

The inscription is in Kannada language and Kannada script and is first documented in the 1905 edition of the Epigraphia Carnatica, volume 09 published by B.L.Rice as Bengaluru Taluk Inscription No 30. The inscription's installation date is given as Shaka 1462, Krodhi Samvatsara, Margashira, Shukla 5, which corresponds to Wednesday, 19 November 1544 A.D. according to the Julian calendar.

Sun, moon, and a Sudarshan Chakra is inscribed on the stone, sun and moon indicates the eternal nature of the grant and the sudarshana chakra is a vaishnavite symbol indicating the religious nature of the inscription. It can be observed that the scribe '0' is used at the beginning of each line to mark the lines and write directly.

=== Transliteration Of The Text ===
The transliteration of the inscription is as follows

sl no.	Kannada	IAST
1.	0 ಶ್ವಸ್ತಿ ಶ್ರೀ ವಿಜಯಾಭ್ದುದಯ ಸಾಲಿವಾಹನ ಸ	0 śvasti śrī vijayābhdudaya sālivāhana sa
2.	0 ಕ ವರುಷ ೧೪೬೨ ನೆಯ ಕ್ರೊಧಿ ಸಂವತ್ಸರದ	0 ka varuṣa 1462 nĕya krŏdhi saṃvatsarada
3.	0 ಮಾರ್ಗ್ಗಸಿರ ಶು೫ಲು ಶ್ರೀ ಮಂನ್ನ್ ಮಹ	0 mārggasira śu5lu śrī maṃnn maha
4.	0 ರಾಜಧಿರಾಜ ರಾಜಪರಮೆಶ್ವರ ಶ್ರೀ ವೀರ	0 rājadhirāja rājaparamĕśvara śrī vīra
5.	0 ಪ್ರಥಾಪ ವೀರಸದಾಸಿವಮಾಹಾರಯರು ಪ್ರಿ	0 prathāpa vīrasadāsivamāhārayaru pri
6.	0 ‌ಥ್ವಿರಾಜ್ಯಂಗೆಉತಂಯಿರಲು ಶ್ರೀ	0 thvirājyaṃgĕutaṃyiralu śrī
7.	0 ಮಂನ್‌ಮಹಮಂಡಲೆಶ್ವರ ಶ್ರೀ	0 maṃnmahamaṃḍalĕśvara śrī
8.	0 ಮರಾಟೆಯ ವಿಟಲೆಶ್ವರದೇವ ಮಹಾ	0 marāṭĕya viṭalĕśvaradeva mahā
9.	0 ಅರಸುಗಳ ಕಾರ್ಯಕೆಕರ್ತ್ತರಾದ ರಾ	0 arasugal̤a kāryakĕkarttarāda rā
10.	0 ಚುರನರಸಪಯಗಳು ಜಕುರ ಅಲಾ	0 curanarasapayagal̤u jakura alā
11.	0 ಳನಾಥ ದೆವರ ಅ ಮ್ರುತಪಡಿ ನೈವೇ	0 l̤anātha dĕvara a mrutapaḍi naive
12.	0 ದ್ಯಕ್ಕೆ ಎಲಕನಾಡ ಸಿವನಸಮು	0 dyakkĕ ĕlakanāḍa sivanasamu
13.	0 ದ್ರಾದ ಸಿಮೆವೊಳಗಣ ಅಲಾಳ	0 drāda simĕvŏl̤agaṇa alāl̤a
14.	0 ಸಂದ್ರಾ ಗ್ರಾಮವನು ವಿಟಲೆಶರ ಅರಸುಗ	0 saṃdrā grāmavanu viṭalĕśara arasuga
15.	0 ಳಿಗೆ ಪುಂಣ್ಯವಾಗಾಬೆಕು ಯೆಂದು ಸ	0 l̤igĕ puṃṇyavāgābĕku yĕṃdu sa
16.	0 ಮರ್ಪಿಸಿದೆಉ ಅ ಗ್ರಾಮಕೆ ಸಲುವ	0 marpisidĕu a grāmakĕ saluva
17.	0 ಚತುಸಿಮೆವೊಳಾಗದ ಕೆಱೆಕುಂಟೆ	0 catusimĕvŏl̤āgada kĕṟĕkuṃṭĕ
18.	0 ಗದೆ ಬೆಜಲು ಗುಡೆಗುಯಲು ತೊಟ	0 gadĕ bĕjalu guḍĕguyalu tŏṭa
19.	. . . ಕೆ ಕಾಡಾರಂಬ ನಿರಾರಂಬ .	. . . kĕ kāḍāraṃba nirāraṃba .
20.	. . . . . . . .	. . . . . . . . . .
21.	. . . . . . . .	. . . . . . . . . . .
22.	. . . . . . . .	. . . . . . . . . . .
	(ಹಿಂಭಾಗ)	(Reverse)
23.	0 ಶ್ವದತ್ತ ದ್ವಿಗುಣಂ ಪುಣ್ಯಂ ಪರ	0 śvadatta dviguṇaṃ puṇyaṃ para
24.	0 ದತನುಪಾಲನಂ ಪರದತ್ತಪ	0 datanupālanaṃ paradattapa
25.	0 ಹಾರೆಣ ಸ್ವದತ್ತ ನಿಷ್ಪಲಂಬವೆತು	0 hārĕṇa svadatta niṣpalaṃbavĕtu
26.	0 ಯಿ ಧರ್ಮಕೆ ತಪಿದರೆ ಗಂಗೆಯ	0 yi dharmakĕ tapidarĕ gaṃgĕya
27.	0 ಲಿ ಕಪಿಲೆರ ಕೊಂದ ಪಾಪಕೆ ಹೊ	0 li kapilĕra kŏṃda pāpakĕ hŏ
28.	0 ವರು	0 varu

=== Summary Of The Inscription ===
This inscription is a record of the donation of the village of Allalasandra by local administrator, Rachur Narasappa, to the Allalanatha temple at Jakkur.

The religious merit of the donation was to benefit an official Marateya Vittaleshwara.

== Allalasandra Yantra Kallu ==
Allalasandra Tantra-Mantra stone
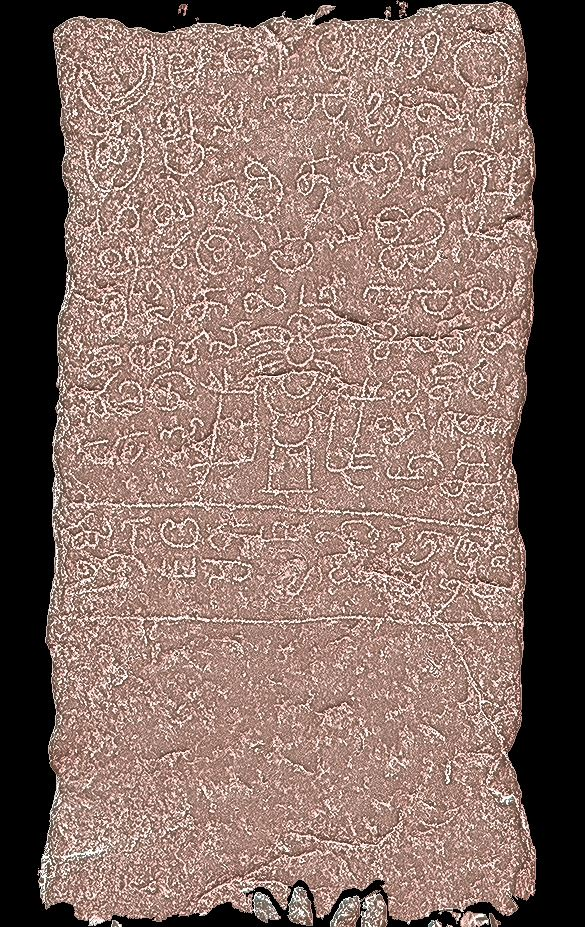
- Digital image obtained by 3D scanning of the Allalasandra Tantra-Mantra stone
- Material: Stone
- Height: 114 cm (45 in)
- Width: 58 cm (23 in)
- Discovered: Allalasandra, Bengaluru, Karnataka
- Present location: 13.0865769°N 77.5875828°E
- Language: Kannada, Tamil

Yantra Kallu (lit. Yantra stone) is a unique typology of inscription stones, wherein they were installed by the villagers when a mass disaster or event struck a village, priests would be called to perform rituals after which figures and diagrams Tantric designs would be inscribed on the stones which were believed to act as a Talisman protecting the village. The inscription has letters of two scripts, Tamil-Grantha letters can be dated between 15th and 16th century CE and Kannada letters can be dated between the 18th to 19th century CE paleographically. The first line of the inscription records the name "Alalasamudra". They are worshipped by the villagers and are believed to cure diseases of cattle and smallpox disease in children.

=== Transliteration Of The Text ===
Kannada reading in the table is transliterated text which originally contains both Grantha and Kannada characters. The transliteration of the inscription is as follows,

Line Number	Kannada	IAST
1	ಆಳಲ ಸಮು	āl̤ala samu
2	ದ್ರ ವು ಯಾಶೈ ಭ ಲಾ	dra vu yāsai bha lā
3	ಮಘನ್‌ ನ್ರಿ ಥನಾರಿ ಪೇ	maghan nri thanārī pe
4	ಷ ರ ಶ್ರೀ ಯೂವ ಐಯ	ś ra śrī yū . aiya
5	ರಿಪಿ ಕ ಳ/ಲಮಾಶಲ	ripi ka l̤a/lamāśala
6	ಕಲಿರನಾಕಿಯ ಕಿ	kaliranākiya ki
7	ನ ದಿ/ವಿ ತುವಿ/ದಿಗೆ ಲ	na di/vi tuvi/digĕ la
8	ಷ/ಶಭಿವಿ .	ṣa/śabhivi .
9	ಯಿಛಿರು	yichiru
10	ಮ . ಲಿ ಚ/ಆ .(ಮ) ನ ನದು ದಿ	māli ca/ā .(ma) na nadu di
11	ವಿಯ ನಾ . .ತೀ . ತಿ	viya nā . .tī . ti

== Allalsandra 1080CE Ramadeva Boar Hunting Herostone ==
It is Kannada hero-stone inscription dated to 1080 CE whose present status remains unknown but was documented in Epigraphia carnatica Volume 9 as BN 32. It records the death of a Ramadeva in a hunting of a wild boar. It was inscribed during the reign of Kulottunga I and his feudal Kadeya Nayaka who ruled Sanne nad, an administrative division during the time.

=== Transliteration ===
The transliteration is as follows,

Line Number	Kannada	IAST
1	ಸ್ವಸ್ತಿ ಶ್ರೀಮನ್ ಮ[ಹ] ಕುಲೋತ್ತುಂಗ ಚೋಳ ಸಣ್ಣೆ ನಾಡ್ ಆಳ್ವ ಕಾಡೆಯ ನಾಯಕನ ಭಂಟನು ಮುಮ್ಮಡಿ ಸೆಟ್ಟಿಯ ಮಗನು ಗುಳಿಯಣ್ಣನ ತಂಮನು ರಾಮ ದೇವನು ಬೇಟೆಗೆ ಹೊರವಟ್ಟು ಹಿರಿಯ-ಹಂದಿಗೆ ಬೇಂಟೆಯಲು ಬಿಟ್ಟದೆ ತಾಗಿ ಕೊಂಡು ದ್ರೇಹ. . . . . ಬಾಧೆಯುಮ್	svasti sriman ma[ha] Kulottunga Chola Sanne nad alva Kadeya Nayakana bhantanu Mummadi Settiya maganu Guliyannana tammanu Rama-devanu betege horavattu hiriya handige benteyalu bittade tagi kondu dreha . . .badheyum

== Allalasandra 1340CE Kameya Dandanayaka Donation inscription ==
It is a Kannada inscription dated to 1340 CE that records the donation made by the son of the "great minister" of the Hoysala king Veera Ballala III, Kameya Dandanayaka, Kameya dannayaka. It mentions that during this period the king was ruling from Tiruvannamalai (lit. Unnamale pattana). The donation is said to be made to an officer designate nad-senabhova Allala according to custom belonging to the fort of Haramaravur. The donation was also decreed to be sarvamanya i.e., exempt from all taxes. It was first documented in Epigraphia carnatica Volume 9 as BN 31. The present status of the inscription is not known.

=== Transliteration ===
The text is published in Epigraphia carnatica,

Line Number	Kannada	IAST
1	ಸ್ವಸ್ತಿ ಶ್ರೀ ಶಕಾಬ್ದ ೧೨೬೩ನೆಯ ವಿಕ್ರಮ ಸಂ ಕಾರ್ತಿಕ ಬ ೫ ಬ್ರೀ ದಂದು ಶ್ರೀರತು ಪ್ರತಾಪ ಚಕ್ರವರ್ತಿ ಶ್ರೀ ಹೊಯ್ಸಳ ವೀರ ಬಲ್ಲಾಳ ದೇವರಸನು ಉಣ್ಣಮಲೆ ಪಟ್ಟಣದಲಿ ಪೃಥ್ವಿ ರಾಜ್ಯಂ ಗೆಯುತ್ತಿರಲು ಶ್ರೀಮನು ಮಹಾ ಪ್ರಧಾನಂ ಕಾಮೇಯ ದಂಡನಾಯಕರ ಮಕ್ಕಳು ಕಾಮೇಯ ದಣ್ಣಾಯಕರು ಯಲಯಕ ನಾಡ ಸೇನಭೋವ ಅಲ್ಲಾಳರಿಗೆ ಶಿಲಾ ಶಾಸನವ ಮಾಡಿ ಕೊಟ್ಟಿ ಕ್ರಮವೆಂತೆಂಡದೆ ಹಾರಮರವೂರ ಕೋಟೆಯ ಪೂರ್ಬಮರ್ಯಾದೆಯ ಚತುಸ್ಸೀಮೆ ಗದ್ದೆ ಬೆದ್ದಲು ಸೀಮೆ ಸಾಮ್ಯವನುಳ್ಳದನು ಸರ್ವಮಾನ್ಯ ಕೊಡಗೆ ಆಗಿ ಚಂದ್ರದಿತ್ಯರುಳ್ಳಮ್ ಬರಮ್ ಸಲುವಂತಾಗಿ ಶಿಲಾ ಶಾಸನವಮಾಡಿ ಕೊಟ್ಟೆವು ಮಂಗಳ ಮಹಾ ಶ್ರೀ ಶ್ರೀ	svasti sri Sakabda 1263 neya Vikrama-sam-Kartika-ba 5 Bri-dandu sriratu pratapa-chakrararti sri-Hoysala-vira-Ballala-Devarasaru Unnamale-pattanadali prithvi-rajyam geyuttiralu srimanu-maha-pradhanam Kameya-dandanayakara makkalu Kameya-dannayakaru Yaleyaka-nada senabova Allalarige sila-sasanava madi kotti kramaventendade Haramaravura koteya purbbamaryadeya chatussime gadde beddalu sime samya vanulladanu sarvamanyada kodage agi chandradityarullam baram saluvantagi sila-sasanavamadi kottevu mangala maha sri sri

=== Translation ===
Epigraphia carnatica Volume 9 documents the translation of the inscription as following,

"Be it well. (On the date specified), when the pratapa-chakravartti Hoysala vira-Ballala-Devarasa was in Unnamale-pattana, ruling the kingdom of the world :— ■ the great minister Kameyadandanayaka's son Kameya-danayaka granted to the nad-senabhova Allala the lands according to former custom belonging to the fort of Haramaravur, as a sarvamdnya kodage."

== Gallery ==
Inscriptions of Allalasandra
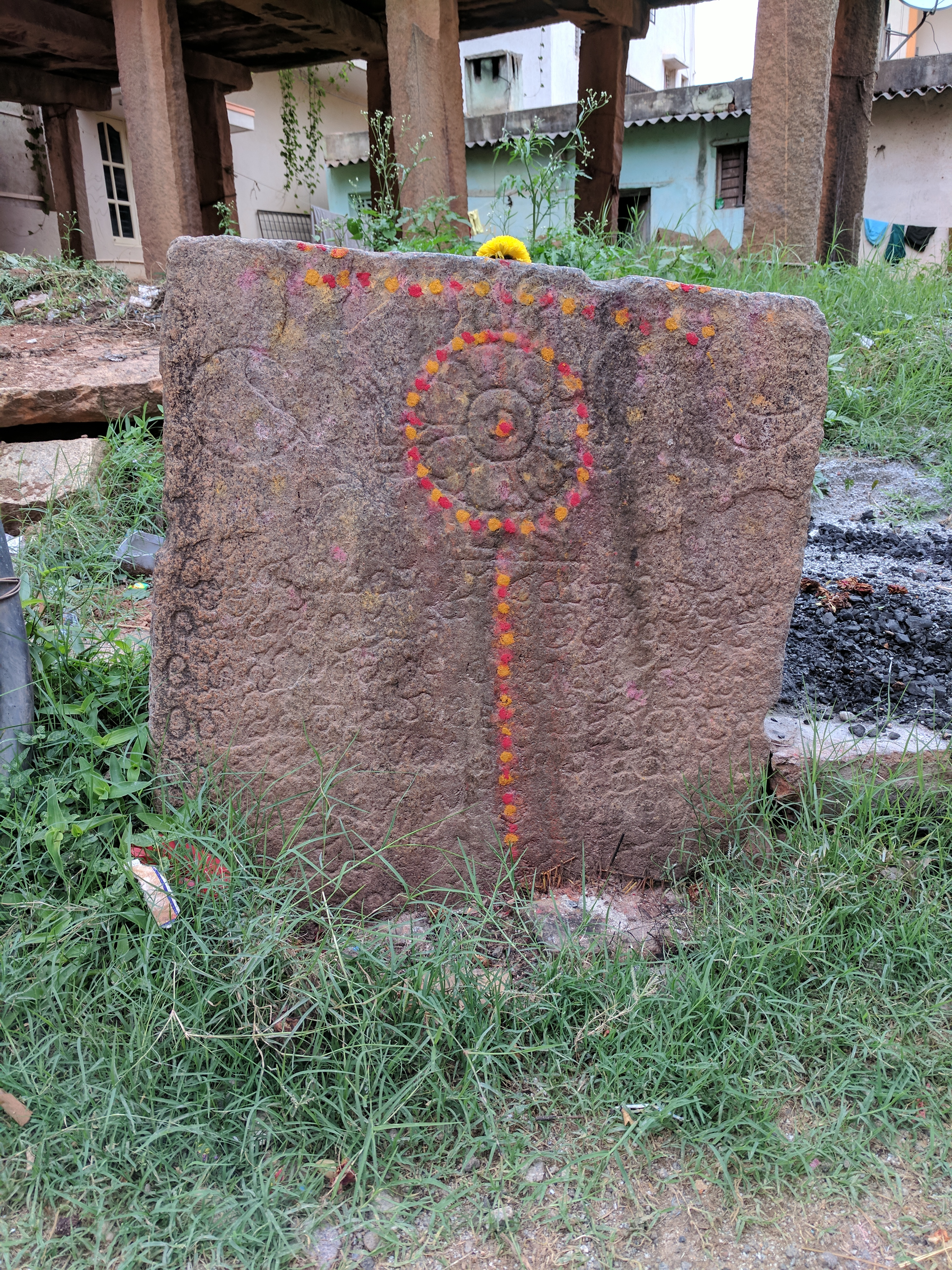

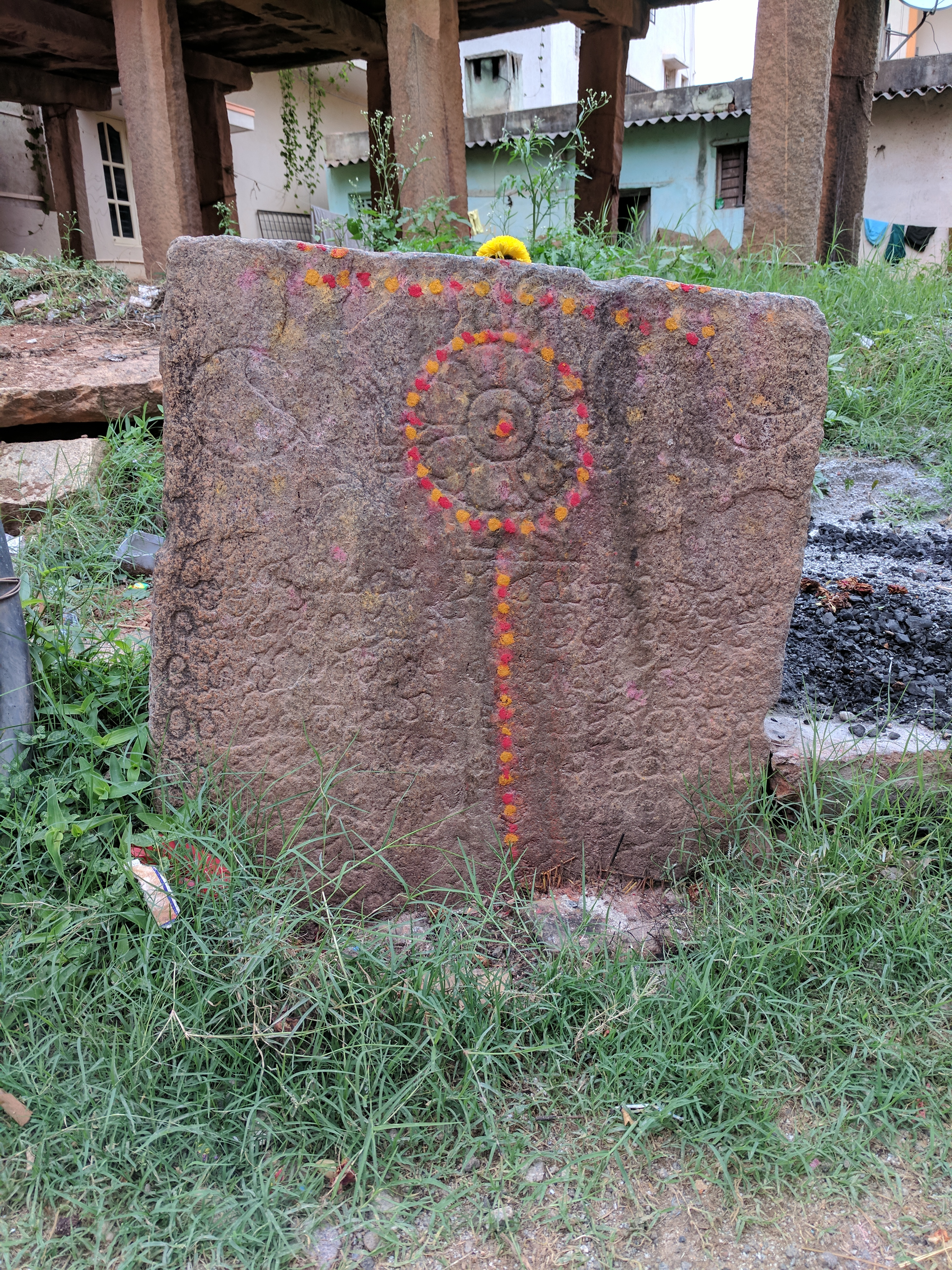

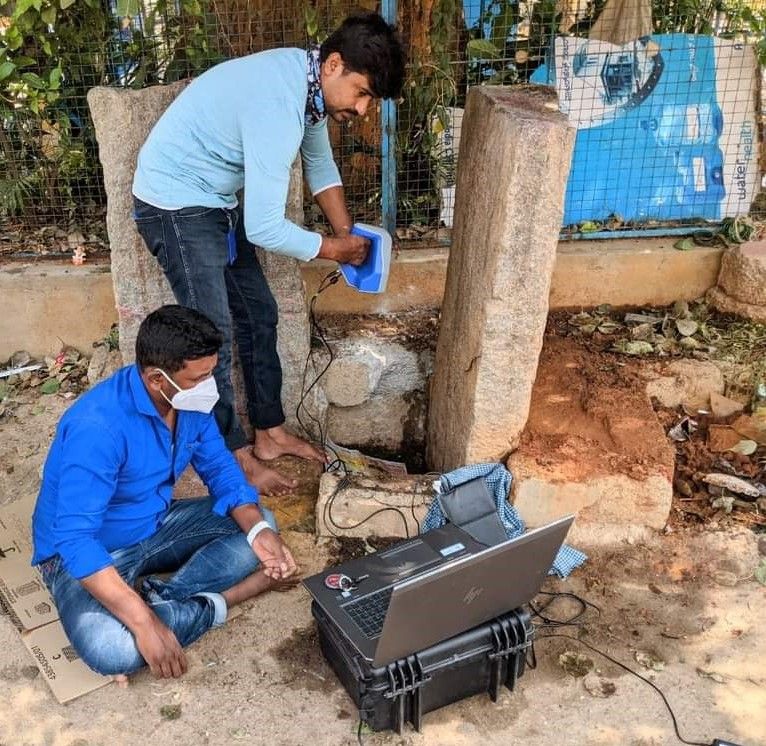
3D scanning of the Rachura Narasapaya donation Inscription

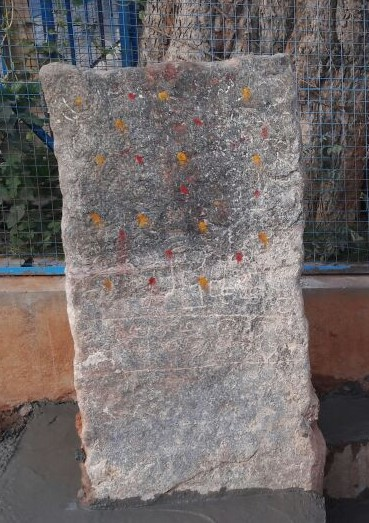
Allalasandra Yantra kallu

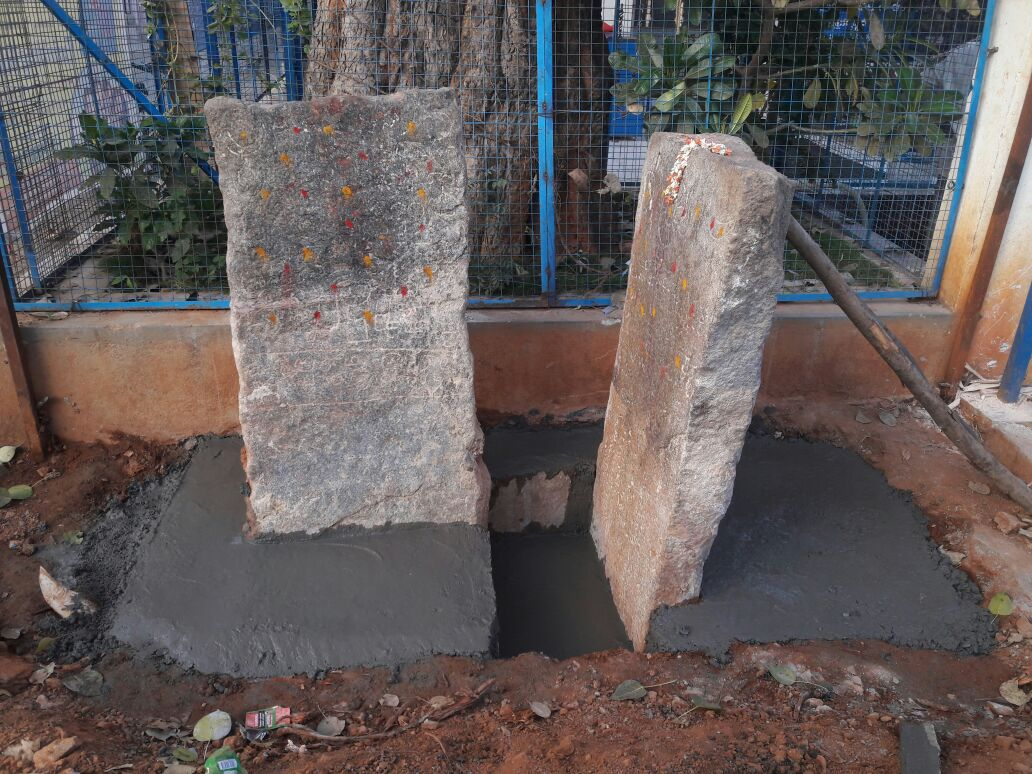

== See also ==
- Indian Inscriptions
- History of Bangalore
