= Belathur inscriptions and hero stones =

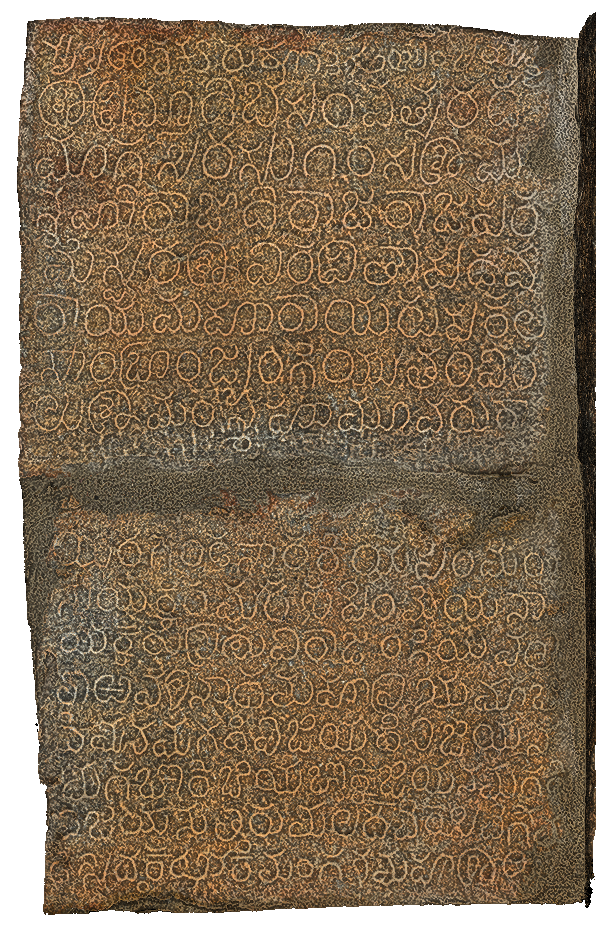
Digital Image of the Belathur 1433CE Devijeeya's Tirumala Temple Garuda Pillar Donation Inscription - Portion 1

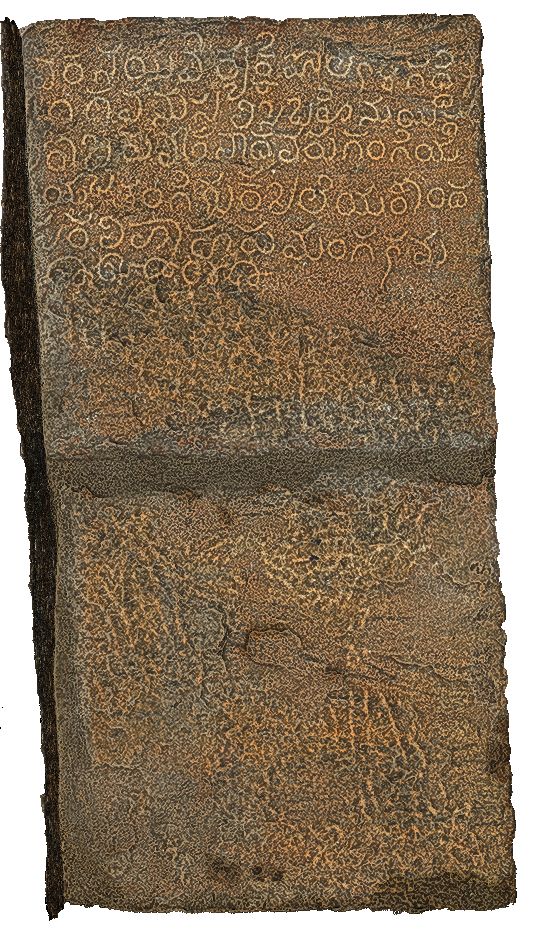
Digital Image of the Belathur 1433CE Devijeeya's Tirumala Temple Garuda Pillar Donation Inscription - Portion 2

Belathur, a sub-locality in Kadugodi, is home to a 15th-century CE Kannada donatory inscription that records a donation by a Devijeeya who erected a pillar for the Tirumala deity and also that he donated four Khandugas of land for the purpose of neivedya (food) offerings to the deity, it was commissioned during the rule of Saaraki's Pemayanayka's son Pemeyanayaka, a feudal chief under the king Devaraya II of the Karnataka Empire (Vijayanagara Empire). Saraki as mentioned in this inscription is a suburb in Bengaluru city. This inscription gives a genealogy of four generations Toravali naadu's rulers as Maachideva-Devijeeya-Chokkijeeya-Devijeeya, Toravali naadu is an administrative in the erstwhile empire, the geographic boundaries of this region remains unknown. The inscription mentions the grant of certain khandugas of land, khanduga is a unit of area measurement. The donation to the Tirumala deity of Belathur is also recorded in an inscription in the Domlur Chokkanathaswamy Temple 16th-century Allapan Inscription, an inscription among the Domlur Inscriptions. This inscription has been documented in Epigraphia Carnatica Vol-9 as Hoskote Inscription Number 155. The Inscription is found at the Radha Rukmini Venugopala Swamy Temple in Belathur.

== Physical characteristics ==
The inscription is 95 cm tall, 59 cm width. The Kannada Characters are approximately 4 cm tall, 2 cm wide & 0.16 cm deep (shallow depth).

== Transliteration ==
The inscription was first documented in Epigraphia Carnatica Vol-9 as Hoskote Inscription Number 155. The text published below is the rereading of the inscription from the journal of the Mythic Society.

Digital Images of each of the characters of this inscription, images of the inscription itself, summary and the other information about the inscription have been shared via Akshara Bhandara software

Line Number	Kannada	IAST
1	ಸ್ವಸ್ತಿ ಶ್ರೀಶಕವರುಷ ೧೩೫೨ಡನೆಯ	svasti śrīśakavaruṣa 1352ḍanĕya
2	ಶ್ರೀಪ್ರಮಾದಿಚ ಸಂವತ್ಸರದ	śrīpramādica saṃvatsarada
3	ಮಾರ್ಗ್ಗಸಿರ ಸು ೧೦ ಸ ಶ್ರೀಮಂ	mārggasira su 10 sa śrīmaṃ
4	ನ್ಮಹಾರಾಜಾಧಿರಾಜ ರಾಜಪರ	nmahārājādhirāja rājapara
5	ಮೇಸ್ವರ ಶ್ರೀವೀರಪ್ರತಾಪ ದೇವ	mesvara śrīvīrapratāpa deva
6	ರಾಯ ಮಹಾರಾಯರು ಷಕಲ	rāya mahārāyaru ṣakala
7	ಸಾಂಬ್ರಾಂಜ್ಯಂಗೆಯುತಂವಿರ	sāṃbrāṃjyaṃgĕyutaṃvira
8	ಲು ಶ್ರೀಮಂನ್ಮಹಾ ಮೂವರುರಾ	lu śrīmaṃnmahā mūvarurā
9	ಯರ ಗಂಡ ಸಾರಕಿಯ ಪೆಂಮಯ	yara gaṃḍa sārakiya pĕṃmaya
10	ನಾಯಕ್ಕರ ಮಕಳು ಪೆಂಮೆಯನಾ	nāyakkara makal̤u pĕṃmĕ yanā
11	ಯಕ್ಕರು ಪ್ರಿಥುವಿ ರಾಜಂಗೆಯಿವಲಿ	yakkaru prithuvi rājaṃgĕyivali
12	ತೊಱವಳಿನಾಡ ಮಹಾಪ್ರಭು ಮಾಚಿ	tŏṟaval̤ināḍa mahāprabhu māci
13	ದೇವನ ಮಗ ದೇವಿಜೀಯ ದೇವಿಜೀಯನ	devana maga devijīya devijīyana
14	ಮಗ ಚೊಕ್ಕಿಜೀಯ ಚೊಕ್ಕಿಜೀಯನ ಮಗ ದೇ	maga cŏkkijīya cŏkkijīyana maga de
15	ವಿಜೀಯನು ತಿರುಮಲದೇವರ ಸೇವೆಗೆ ಮಾ	vijīyanu tirumaladevara sevĕgĕ mā
16	ಡಿಸಿದ ಕಂಭಕೆ ಮಂಗಳ ಮಹ ಶ್ರೀ ಶ್ರೀ	ḍisida k ̤ aṃbhakĕ maṃgal̤a maha śrī śrī
	(ಪಕ್ಕದ ಕಲ್ಲಿನ ತುಂಡಿನಲ್ಲಿರುವುದು)	(on an adjacent small stone)
17	.ವರ ನಯಿವೇದ್ಯಕ್ಕೆ ಹೊಲ ಲ್(s*) ೪ ಗದ್ದೆ	.vara nayivedyakkĕ hŏla l(s*) 4 gaddĕ
18	. . . . ಗವನು ಸಲಿಸಿ ಬಹೆನು ಯಿದ	. . . . gavanu salisi bahĕnu yida
19	. . ರೊಬ್ಬರು ವಕ್ರವಾದವರು ಗಂಗೆಯ	. . rŏbbaru vakravādavaru gaṃgĕya
20	. . . ಯ ತಂಗೇಳು ಕಪಿಲೆಯ ಕೊಂದ	. . . ya taṃgel̤u k ̤ apilĕya kŏṃda
21	. ಪದಲಿ ಹೋಹರು ಮಂಗಳ ಮ	. padali hoharu maṃgal̤a ma
22	. ಶ್ರೀ ಶ್ರೀ ಶ್ರೀ ಶ್ರೀ ಶ್ರೀ	. śrī śrī śrī śrī śrī

== Shapashaya ==
Shapashaya are final imprecatory verses in inscriptions that are written in the end, serving cautionary notices to people against their destruction. It is common to many South Asian Inscriptions, they are inscribed to sanctify the grant and preserve the record from harm. The Inscription has such a Shapashaya stating any individual who violates the grant will be cursed with the same fate as someone who kills a Kapile, an orange brown sacred cow on the banks of river Ganga. According to the Garuda Purana, the act of killing a cow is believed to result in rebirth of a person into a hunchback in their subsequent birth The inscription further states that those who misuse this donation will face demerit equal to killing of cow on the banks of river Ganga.

== See also ==
- Domlur inscriptions and hero stones
- Inscription stones of Bengaluru
