= Inscription stones of Bengaluru =

Coordinates: 12.87682°N 77.62646°E

Inscription stones of Bengaluru refers to numerous historical stone plaques, tablets, and rock carvings bearing inscriptions (epigraphs) and sometimes sculptures (such as hero stones) found throughout the Bengaluru metropolitan area in Karnataka, India. Within the limits of the modern Bruhat Bengaluru Mahanagara Palike, approximately 175 such stones have been documented in various historical surveys and publications.

These artifacts, dating from the Ganga dynasty period (c. 4th century CE) through the Chola, Hoysala, Vijayanagara, Maratha, Mysore Kingdom, and British periods up to the early 20th century, provide invaluable primary source material for understanding the region's history, toponymy, language evolution, socio-religious practices, and administrative structures. They include various types, such as Vīragallu (hero stones), grant inscriptions (recording donations of land or taxes), temple inscriptions, royal decrees, Nisidhi stones (Jain memorials), and records of construction activities.

Written predominantly in Kannada and Tamil languages and scripts, with some examples in Telugu, Sanskrit, Grantha, and Persian, these inscriptions are distributed across numerous historical localities within modern Bengaluru, including Begur, Hebbal, Malleshwaram, Kodigehalli, Domlur, and Yelahanka. Notable discoveries include the Begur inscription (c. 890 CE), which contains the earliest known written reference to the name "Bengaluru". Systematic documentation began with B. Lewis Rice's Epigraphia Carnatica in the late 19th century, followed by publications from the Mysore Archaeological Department and others. However, rapid urbanization, neglect, and weathering pose significant threats to the survival of these artifacts. Preservation efforts are undertaken by governmental bodies like the Karnataka State Department of Archaeology, Museums and Heritage, alongside non-governmental organizations such as The Mythic Society, INTACH Bengaluru Chapter, and citizen initiatives like the 'Inscription Stones of Bengaluru' project, which focuses on discovery, documentation, digital preservation, and raising public awareness.

== Toponymy ==
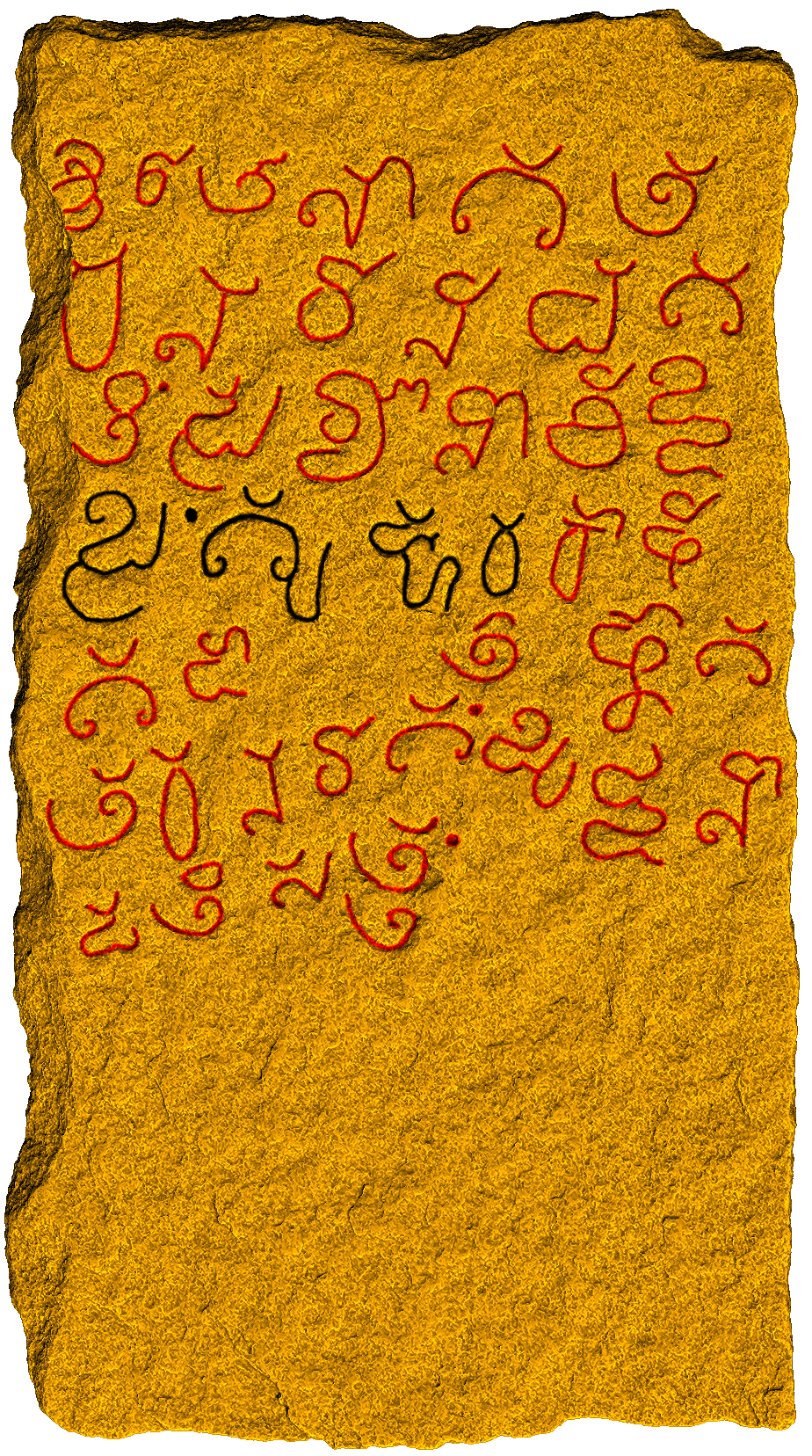
The 900CE Begur inscription containing the name "Benguluru" in it.

Inscriptions found in the city have contributed immensely to the study of place names of many Bengaluru localities. In addition, they have helped prove the millennium-old antiquity of the settlement known as Bengaluru. The oldest reference to the name of the city is found at the Nāgeśvara temple complex in Begur. The inscription is dated to circa 900 CE and mentions "Bēngul̤ūr" as a territory around which a war was fought.

A 1247 CE inscription at the Sōmēśvara Temple in Old Madiwala mentions 'Veṇgalūr's big tank'. It is a common feature of Tamil phonetics to replace 'Ba' as used in Kannada with 'Va'.

A Telugu inscription at the Ranganātha Temple in Chikkapete dated 1628 CE mentions 'Bēngul̤ūr' and 'Bēngal̤ūr' numerous times. Notably, it also mentions that Keṃppegauni's son, the second Keṃpegaunayya was ruling at the time of engraving, and extensively lists various peoples and places in and around the settlement. Shortly after, a 1669 CE boulder inscription in present-day Malleshwaram also mentions 'Bēngul̤ura Mahanāḍu', indicating the size of the settlement was large by the time's standards.

An inscription at Kothanur dated 1705 CE records the village being donated for the upkeep of the Venkaṭeśvara Temple in 'Bēngul̤ūra koṭē', i.e. the Bangalore Fort. Similar inscriptions of donation mentioning the city by name are found in Bingipura and Vajarahalli dated 1759 CE and 1765 CE respectively. All these donations were made by the Wodeyars.

Inscriptions dated to the last two decades of the 18th century CE from the Manchi Sōmēśvara Temple in Chikkapete record the building of the temple and the grant it received for upkeep. These were commissioned by a noble from the Hālēri Court in Kodagu and mention the temple being located in 'Bēngal̤ūr's Cikkapēṭe'.

Similarly, inscriptions have confirmed the ancient origins of various localities within the modern city. For example, an inscription found in Malleshwaram, dated 1669 CE, refers to the area as "Mallapura", predating its modern layout. The Hebbal Kittayya inscription from 750 CE mentions "Perbboḷalnāḍu", considered the archaic form of Hebbal. Inscriptions from the 13th-16th centuries refer to Domlur by names like "Tombalur" or "Dombalur". A 10th-century inscription found in Jakkur contains the word "jakkiyū", likely an early version of the area's name, which appears clearly as "Jakkur" in a 1342 CE inscription. An inscription from 1304 CE found in Doddanekkundi mentions the village name as "Nerkundi". Other examples derived from inscriptions include Vinnamangala (modern Binnamangla, mentioned 1266 CE), Bidarkal (modern Doddabidirkal, mentioned 750 CE), Vengalur (modern Madivala, mentioned 1247 CE), Agara (mentioned 870 CE), Gunjur (mentioned 1301 CE), Hoody (mentioned 1332 CE), Kothanur (mentioned 1705 CE), Yeshwantpura (mentioned 1650 CE), Nagashettihalli (mentioned 1342 CE), Kyatamaranahalli (mentioned 1386 CE), and Hessarghatta (mentioned from 1292 CE onwards). These findings help trace the evolution of place names and demonstrate continuous settlement in these areas over centuries.

These findings help trace the evolution of place names and demonstrate continuous settlement in these areas over centuries.

== Types of inscriptions ==
The inscription stones found in Bengaluru encompass a variety of types, reflecting different aspects of historical life:

=== Vīragallus with inscriptions ===
These memorial stones are erected to immortalize individuals who died performing heroic deeds, such as protecting their community in battle or cattle raids. Many examples, particularly dating back to the 9th and 10th centuries but spanning periods like the Ganga, Nolamba, Chola, Hoysala, and Vijaynagar dot the greater Bengaluru region. They often feature relief carvings depicting the heroic event, the hero's journey to heaven (svarga), and worship. These artifacts act as valuable sources for understanding socio-cultural details and micro-history. Examples have been found in areas such as Begur, Hebbal, Agara, Kengeri, T. Dasarahalli, and Kaikondrahalli.

=== Grants and donations ===
These inscriptions record grants of land, villages, taxes, gifts to temples, or other resources and acts of charity. They were typically made by rulers, officials, merchant guilds, or individuals to temples, Brahmins (as Agrahara), monasteries, or for public works like tank construction. They provide information about land ownership, social hierarchies, and economic activity. Examples include the Hebbal-Kittauya Ganga inscription (c. 750 CE), the Kodigehalli inscriptions (14th-16th centuries CE), and the Malleshwaram inscription (1669 CE). Inscriptions of this kind are also found in Jakkur, Allalasandra, Kethamaranahalli and other places in Bengaluru.

=== Temple inscriptions ===
Found on the walls, pillars, or foundations of temples, these inscribe details about temple construction, patronages, rituals, donations for temple maintenance, festivals, or the installation of deities. They reveal the antiquity and significance of various temples in Bengaluru and provide insights into the religious dynamics of the past. Temples at Malleshwaram, Domlur, Madivala, Begur, Belur, and Vibhutipura contain such inscriptions. For example, the 1669 CE inscription found in Malleshwaram records the donation of a village to the Mallikarjuna temple by the Maratha king Ekoji I. The Chokkanathaswamy Temple in Domlur also contains several Chola and Hoysala period inscriptions.

=== Royal decrees and edicts ===
These pronouncements by rulers and officials communicate official orders or proclamations, offering insights into administrative practices, legal systems, and political events. Such inscriptions are found in Domlur, Madivala, Kumbarahalli, and Begur.

=== Nisidhi inscriptions ===
These are Jaina religious inscriptions erected in remembrance of people who voluntarily led themselves to death by a ritual called Sallekhana. These memorial stones specific to Jainism commemorate the voluntary death undertaken by Jain ascetics or devout laity. Examples of such inscriptions are found in Begur and Kalya.

=== Construction Commissions ===
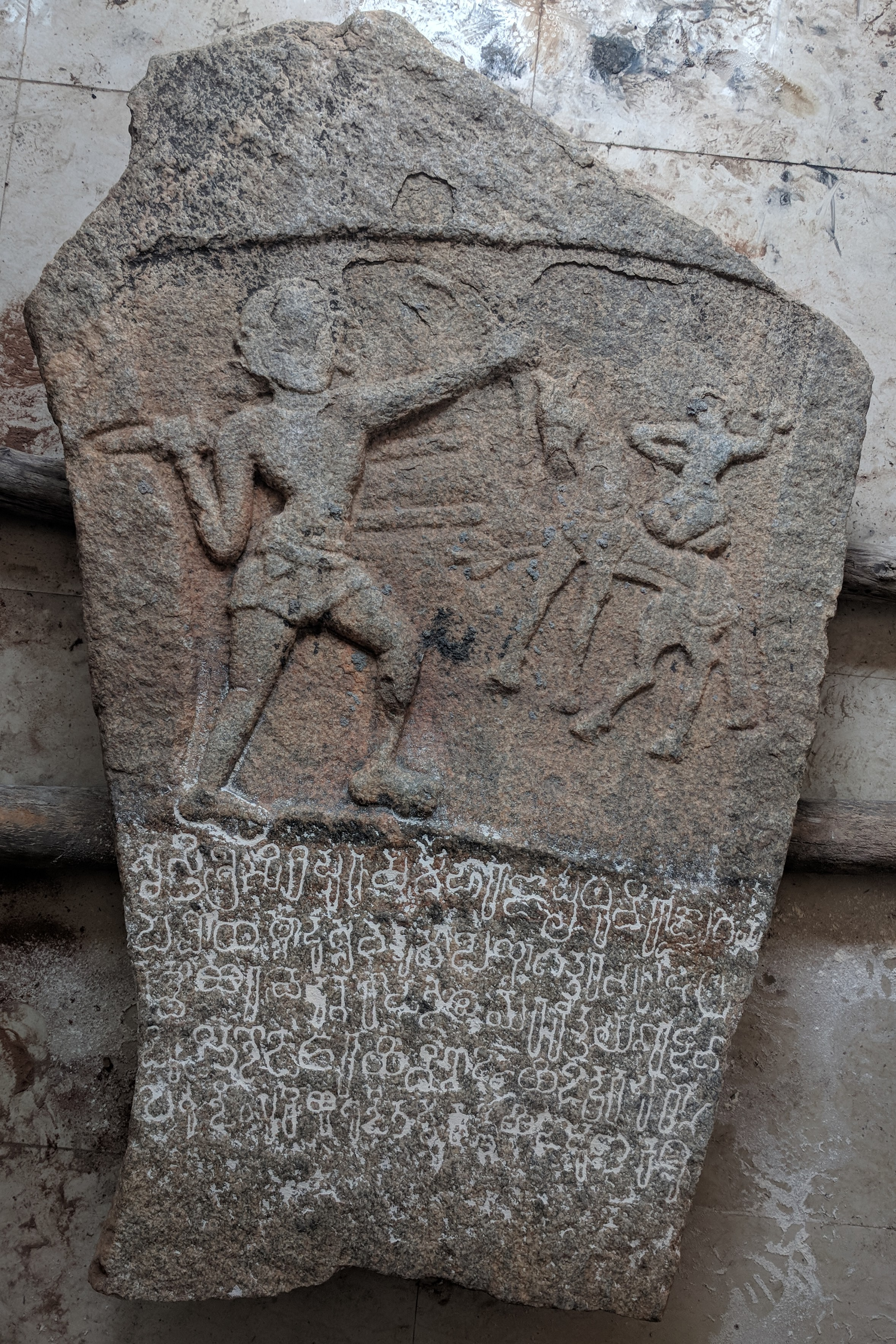
The 750CE Hebbal-Kittayya hero-stone with inscription

These are inscriptions that document the building or renovation of public works, such as Lakes (kere), Santhes (Markets), Temples, Villages, or fortifications. Such inscriptions are found in Ramasandra, Hoodi, and Begur.

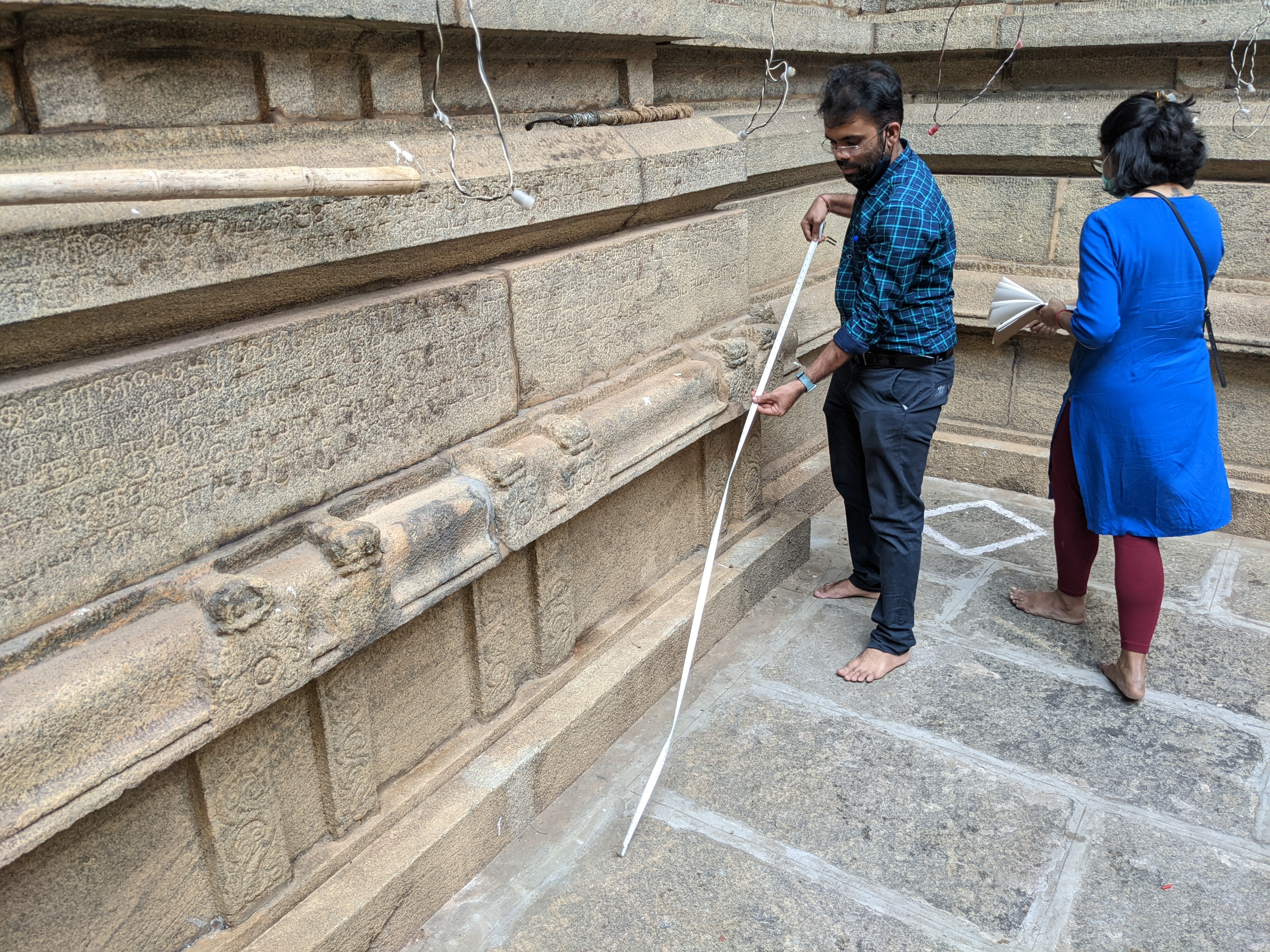
16th-century Singaperumal Nambiyar Tamil Inscription, Cŏkkanātha Temple

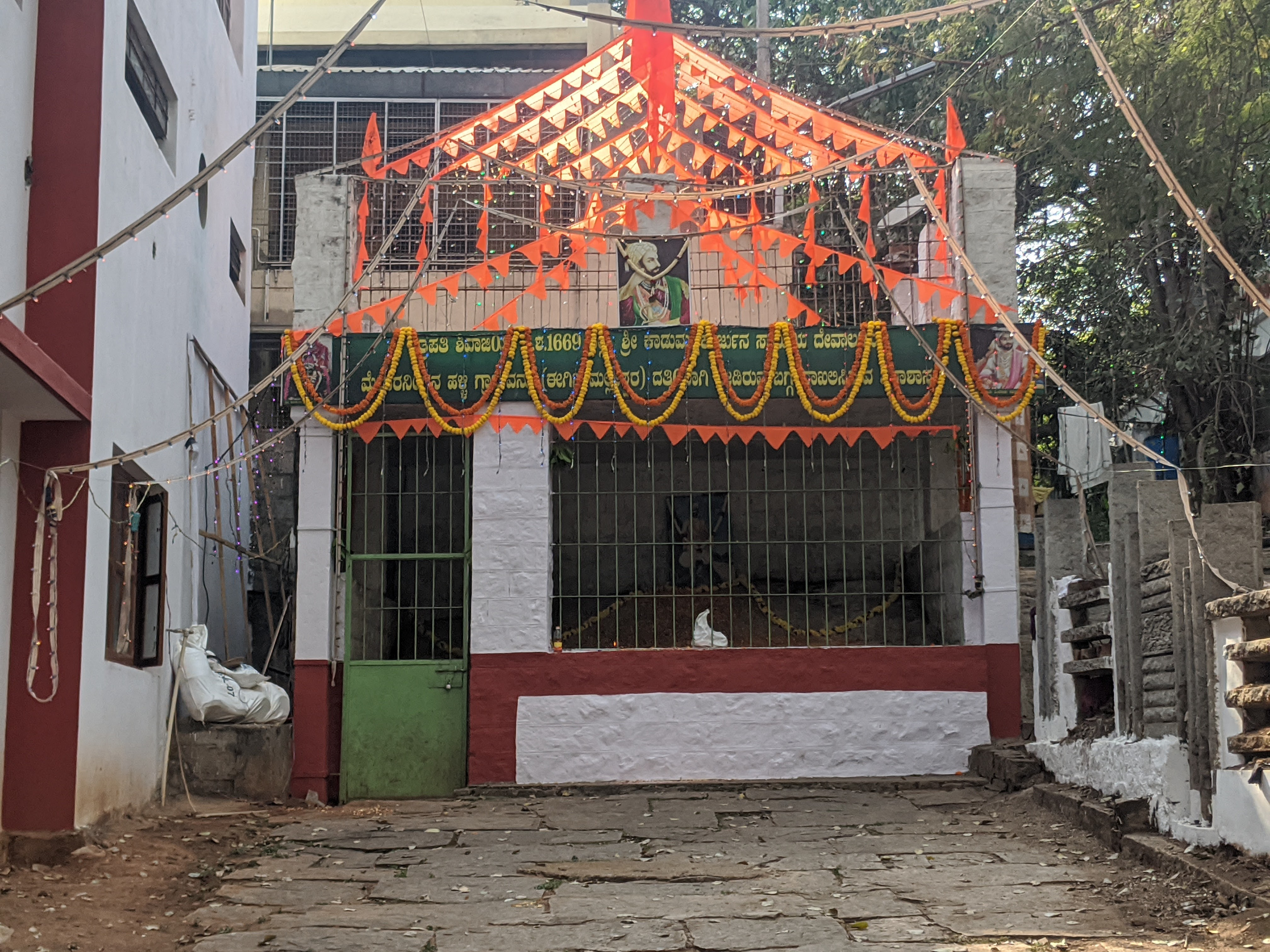
Malleshwaram 1669CE Ekoji Inscription

== Epigraphy of localities ==
Historical inscriptions are widespread across numerous localities around the city. They indicate the antiquity of human presence and the history of multiple modern settlements. They often also contribute to toponymical studies of these areas.

=== Hebbal ===
The Hebbal Kittayya Inscription found in this locality is one of the oldest in the city, dating to 750 CE. This inscribed hero-stone was rediscovered on 1 May 2018. The name Perbboḷalnāḍu, mentioned in the inscription, is thought to be the archaic form of the contemporary name Hebbal. Inscriptions recording donations from the 17th century CE are also found in the area. By this period, these texts already refer to the territory by its current name.

=== Domlur ===
Most ancient inscriptions of this locality document donations to the Cŏkkanātha Temple. This temple was likely first established in the 13th century CE and continued to be patronized well into the 16th century CE before going into disuse. Inscriptions refer to the region by various names such as Tombalur, Dombalur, and Tesi Manicka Patanam, the first being the oldest as well as most common. These texts are rich with names of patrons, priests and rituals of the temple and many other social features.

=== Malleshwaram ===
Malleshwaram has yielded two inscriptions of historical significance. The first, dated to 1669 CE, records a donation to the Mallikarjuna temple by the Maratha king Ekoji I. This inscription mentions the village of Mallapura, an archaic version of the modern name Malleshwaram, and provides insights into the Maratha presence and administrative practices in the region. It also features symbolic engravings of the sun, moon, and linga, which hold cultural and religious significance.

The second inscription, known as the Jakkarayanakere inscription, is undated but likely related to a donation or grant. Although incomplete, it mentions the historical administrative division of "Yalahanka Naad" (present-day Yelahanka), offering valuable geographical context. The inscription's current location and physical condition remain unknown.

Together, these inscriptions shed light on the historical development of Malleshwaram, its connections to broader regional dynamics, and the social and religious practices of the past.

=== Jakkur ===
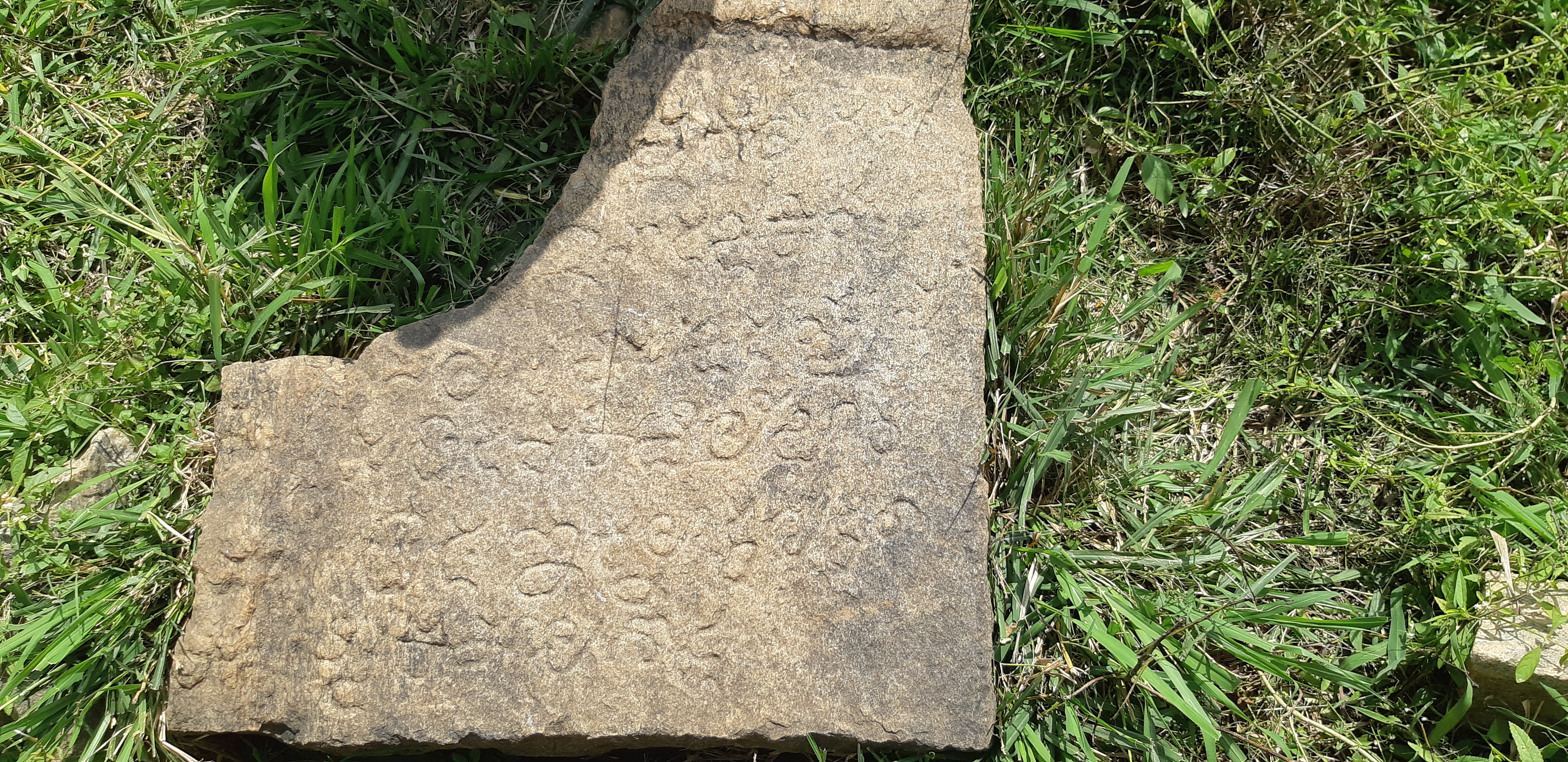
Kalnadu 10th century CE inscription

Inscriptions dated ranging from the 9th to the 15th century CE have been found in this area. Two undatable inscriptions estimated palaeographically to be from circa 10th century have been discovered here in recent years. One of these contains the word "jakkiyū", which is possibly an archaic form of the modern name. An inscription recording a land grant from 1342 CE makes clear mention of Jakkur as a village.

=== Chikkabanavara ===
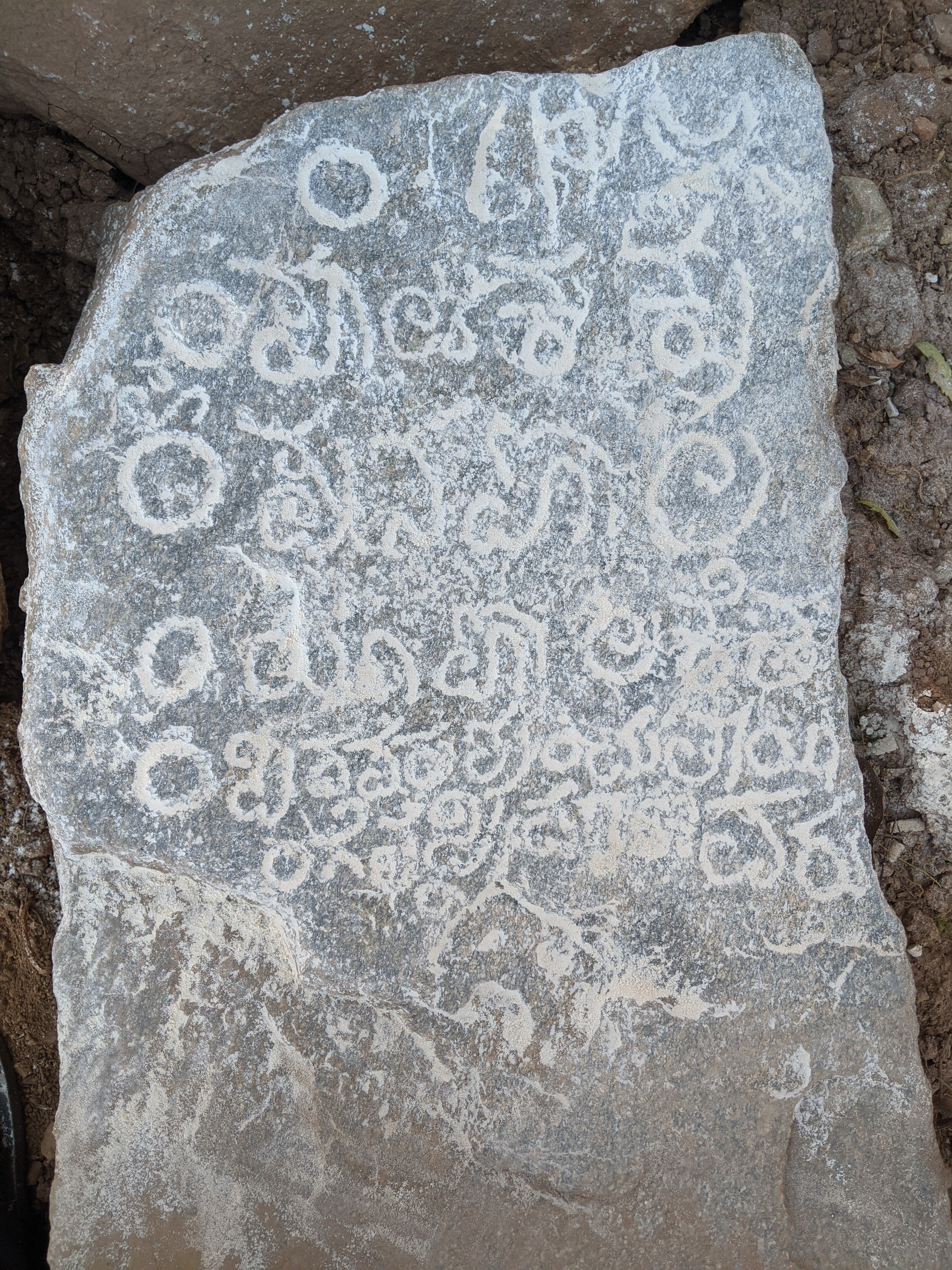
Chikkabanavara 17th-century Brahmin Krishna Inscription

Inscriptions dating from the 12th to the 17th centuries CE have been recorded in this locality. Most of these inscriptions are recent discoveries made during the renovation of a Kalyani in the area. One of these, palaeographically dated to circa 17th century CE, reads "kam. . .banavara", suggesting that the name goes back at least four centuries. Other inscriptions in this area also have unique features. One seems to have inscribed the invocatory verse of Bāṇabhaṭṭa's Harṣacarita, for example. Another has cryptic lines that cannot be contextualized, though the "rāja bāṇasura" mentioned could possibly relate to the name of the principality.

=== Allalasandra ===
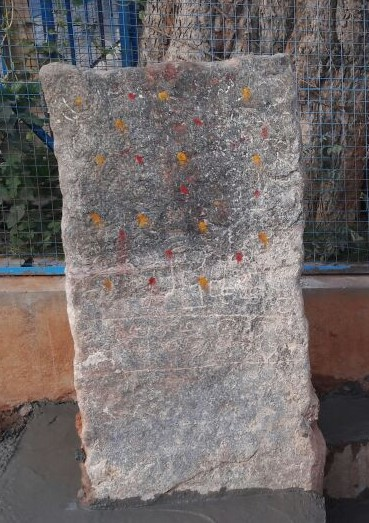
Allalasandra Yantra Stone Inscription

The locality has inscriptions dated between the 11th and 19th centuries CE. One currently untraceable inscription dated to 1340CE records land being donated to one sēnabhōva Allāl̤a, who is possibly the individual the village is named after. Another inscription dated 1544 CE mentions the village by its current name and records that the whole village was donated for the worship of "lord Alāl̤anātha of Jakur". A yantra stone with an inscription dated palaeographically to the 19th century CE mentions "Āl̤alasamudra", an archaic version of modern parlance.

=== Singapura ===
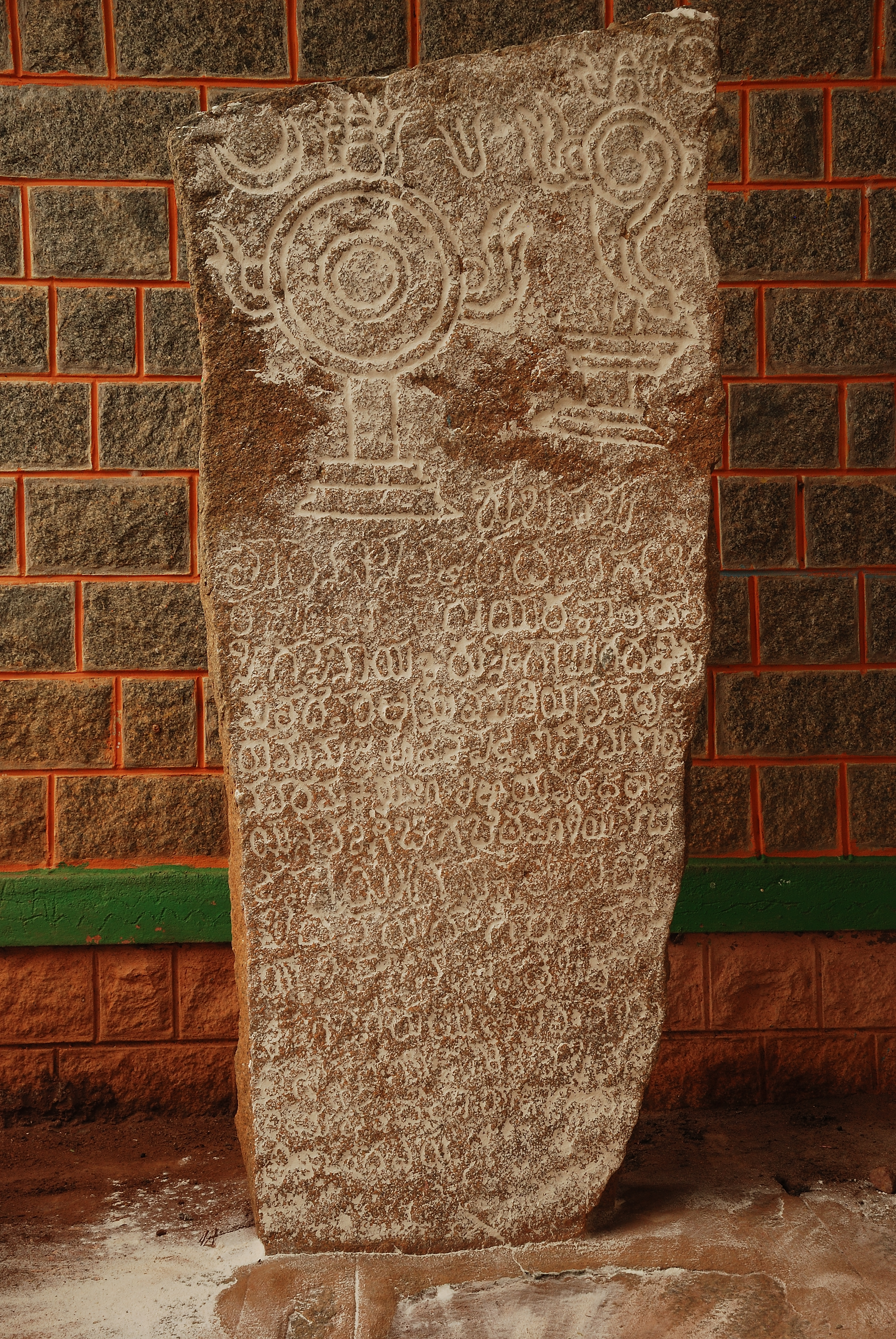
Chikkabettahalli Singappanayaka Inscription

All inscriptions referring to this village revolve around the temple of the deity today called Varadarāja. The first of these is found at nearby Chikkabettahalli village dated 1524 CE, which records Singapanāyaka donating said village to the deity Tiruvēnagal̤anāta of Tirumalē at Singāpura. It is thought possible that the village of Singāpura received its name from the same Singapanāyaka. Two further inscriptions dated 1528 CE and 1530 CE from Singapura and Harohalli respectively also refer to temple donations using the name of the area still prevalent today.

=== Dasarahalli (Tumkur road) ===
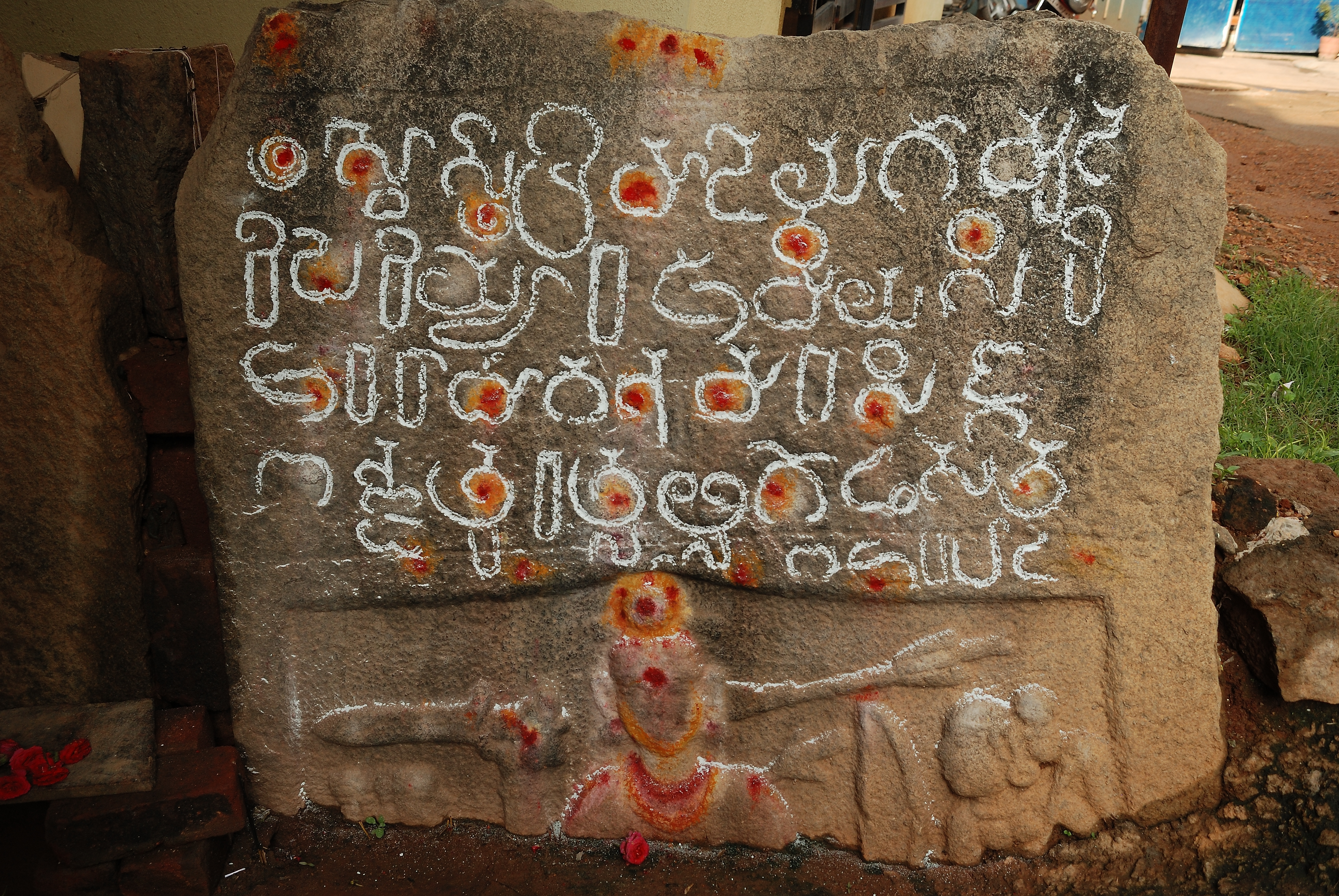
Dasarahalli Skirmish Hero Stone

Inscribed hero stones dated from the 8th to the 11th centuries CE have been found in this area. Two of these stones commemorate heroes who fell during cattle raids. Two others record warriors dying in war and skirmish.

=== Yelahanka ===
While Yelahanka-nadu, also referred to as Elava, Yelavaka, and Illaipaka in various records, was a major principality from the 15th to 17th centuries CE, not much of its traces are found in the present-day locality of the same name. Epigraphy in the modern bounds of this area is limited to inscriptions at the Veṇugopāla temple. Three inscriptions on the Garudagamba of the temple record the erection of the pillar for an Ānjaneya temple by Seṭṭi merchants.

=== Begur ===
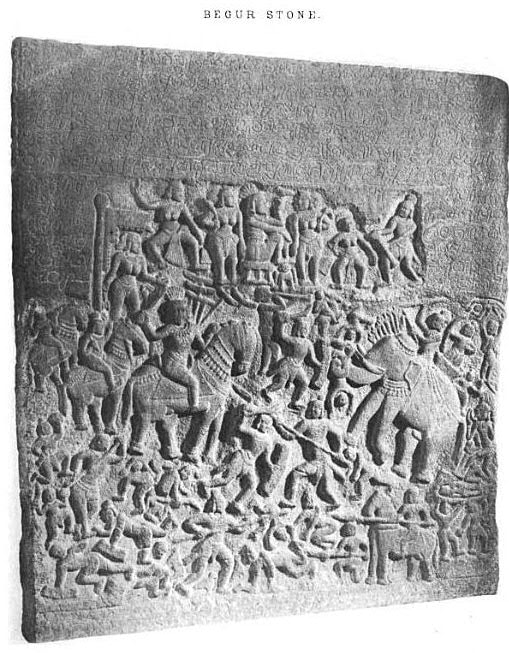
Begur Herostone mentioning Bĕṃpūru

This is an ancient locality with an abundance of epigraphical evidence. An inscribed hero stone found here, dated to 890CE, identifies this region as 'Bĕṃpūru' - a possible archaic version of the modern name. This same inscription also contains mentions of numerous other ancient settlements in the Bengaluru region. The Nāgeshvara temple complex has numerous inscriptions dating from the 11th to 15th centuries CE. The earliest of these refer to the area as "Veppūr" an archaic form of Begur. Numerous memorial stones have been found in the area dating to the 9th and 10th centuries CE. An inscription from 1416 CE records the existence of a Jinālaya in this region, the ruins of which can still be found.

=== Belur ===
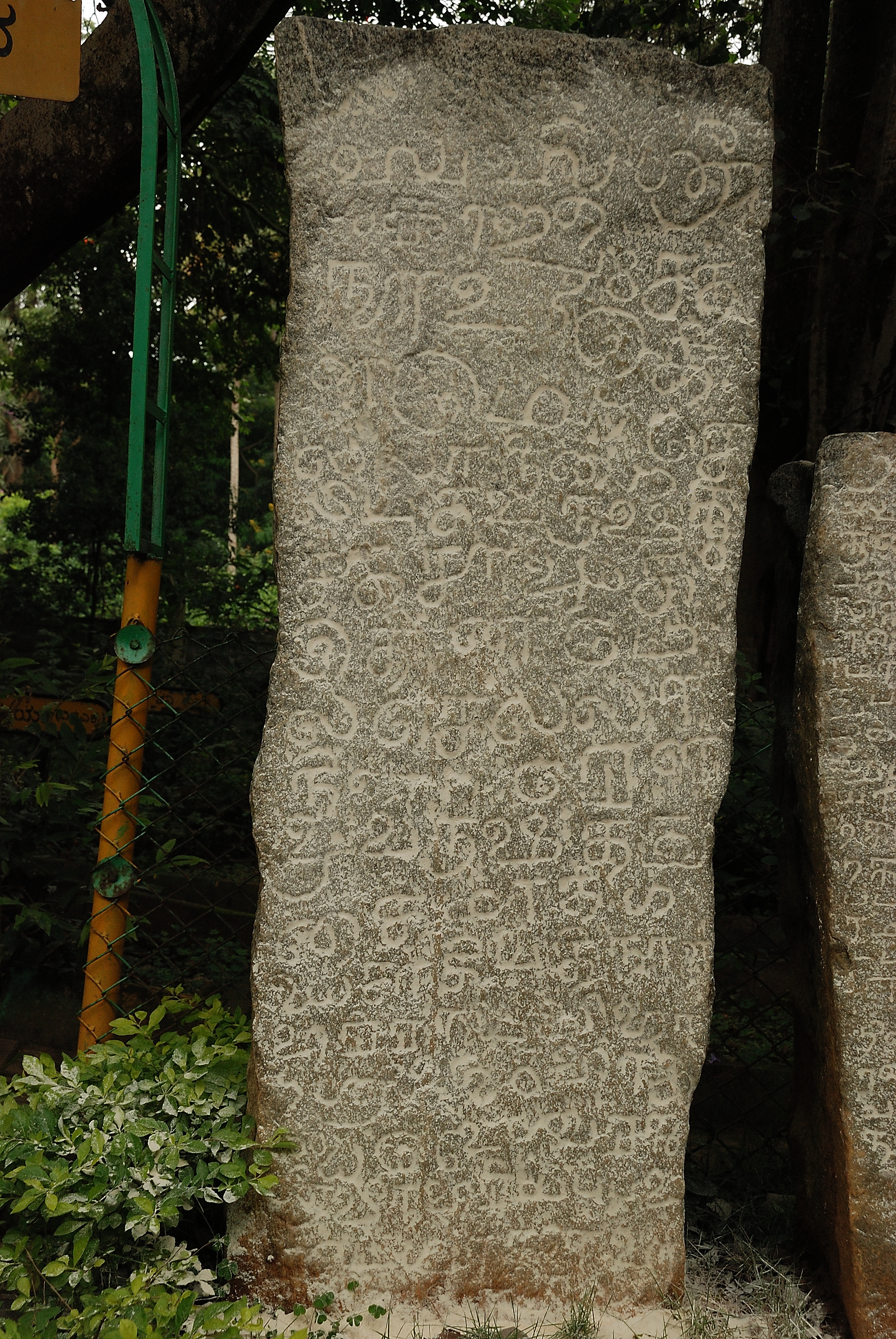
Belur 1381CE Donation Inscription

This village, now the location of the National Aerospace Laboratories campus, has a temple complex housing multiple Tamil inscriptions. The earliest of these is in and dated to 1295 CE and is engraved on the basement of the Sōmēsvara Temple in the complex. Another donation inscription dated 1381 mentions 'Vēlūr', the archaic version of the present name. Sculptures from the 8th and 10th centuries have been found at this complex, pushing the date of this settlement back further.

== Languages and scripts ==
Most inscriptions in the city are in the Kannada and Tamil languages. Some epigraphs in Telugu and Sanskrit have also been found. A few inscriptions from the 18th century CE onwards are also in Persian. Various scripts, such as Kannada, Grantha, Tamil, Devanagari and Persian, have been used as suitable in these inscriptions.

== Publications documenting Bengaluru's inscriptions ==
=== Epigraphia Carnatica ===
This series, published by the Mysore Archaeological Department and later the Directorate of Archaeology and Museums, Karnataka, is the most comprehensive source of inscription information in Karnataka. Its ninth volume, published in 1905, specifically focuses on Bangalore District and covers almost 1500 inscriptions from the region.

=== Mysore archaeology reports ===
These Annual Reports of Mysore Archaeology Department starting from the late 19th century document new inscription discoveries made by members of the Archaeological Survey of Mysore during fieldwork. Reports from years ending 1910, 1914, 1915, 1919, 1922, and 1942 record findings from the region of Bengaluru.

=== South Indian inscriptions ===
This series, published by the Archaeological Survey of India, includes several volumes dedicated to inscriptions from Karnataka, with some containing references to inscriptions found in Bengaluru.

=== The Indian Antiquary ===
This pioneering journal of Oriental research, published from 1872 to 1916, featured numerous articles and translations of inscriptions from Bengaluru, offering valuable insights into early interpretations and discoveries.

=== Local journals and articles ===
Numerous local journals and research articles have featured studies and translations of specific Bengaluru inscriptions, offering in-depth analysis and interpretations. Notably, publications like Quarterly Journal of the Mythic Society, Itihasa Darshana, and Itihasa Darpana, Sadhane, Karnataka Lochana, Kannada Sahitya parishatpatrike, and Manavika Karnataka, have made significant contributions to documenting and understanding these historical records.

== Current status and preservation ==
According to recent field research, it has been found that 30-40% of all epigraphs recorded in the past are currently untraceable. Due to rapid urbanization, they have either been moved to different locations, reused for other purposes or destroyed. Natural weathering and corrosion also deteriorate the surface and engravings of these artifacts, even if placed at a secure location.

=== Preservation initiatives ===
==== Inscription Stones of Bengaluru ====
This is a citizen-led initiative dedicated to protecting and promoting historical inscriptions. Their efforts include creating a comprehensive database of inscription locations, photographs, and translations, as well as raising awareness about the importance of these stones and advocating for their preservation. Their operations involve on-site visits to locate inscriptions and explain their significance to localities. They also organize events for outreach and education to involve the public of various strata to participate actively in preserving and popularizing historical inscriptions.

==== The Mythic Society's Bengaluru Inscriptions 3D Digital Conservation Project ====
The project began in January 2021 and aims to 3D digitally conserve 1500 ancient stone inscriptions in the greater Bengaluru region. The project uses commercially available handheld 3D scanners to create digital models of the inscriptions. Such models would remain intact and accessible with no impact of aging. Even if the physical inscription was destroyed or lost, these digital replicas will maintain all possible information about the inscription. As of February 2024, the project has digitized 600 inscriptions and steadily adding more to its database. The project prioritizes scanning inscriptions in urban and semi-urban locations as they face a higher risk of destruction.

==== INTACH (Indian National Trust for Art and Cultural Heritage) Bangalore Chapter ====
The trust's mission is to safeguard and preserve India's extensive natural, architectural, and cultural heritage. Their Bangalore Chapter consists of a diverse team of professionals raising awareness, facilitating dialogue between the government and the public, providing architectural and engineering advice for heritage building owners, and documenting the city's history. The trust came forward to reinstall the 10th century CE Bengaluru Inscription at Begur with shelter at the Nāgeshvara temple complex. The organization has also conducted detailed documentation of the Sōmēsvara Temple at Halasuru, including its inscription, and developed an interactive virtual exhibition of the site.

=== Digital preservation ===
The Mythic Society's Bengaluru Inscriptions 3D Digital Conservation Project has also led to the development of digital tools to further the study and preservation of Bengaluru inscriptions. Two such tools are Aksharabhandara and Kannada Inscription Tool, which were first announced on 5 October 2024.

==== Aksharabhandara ====
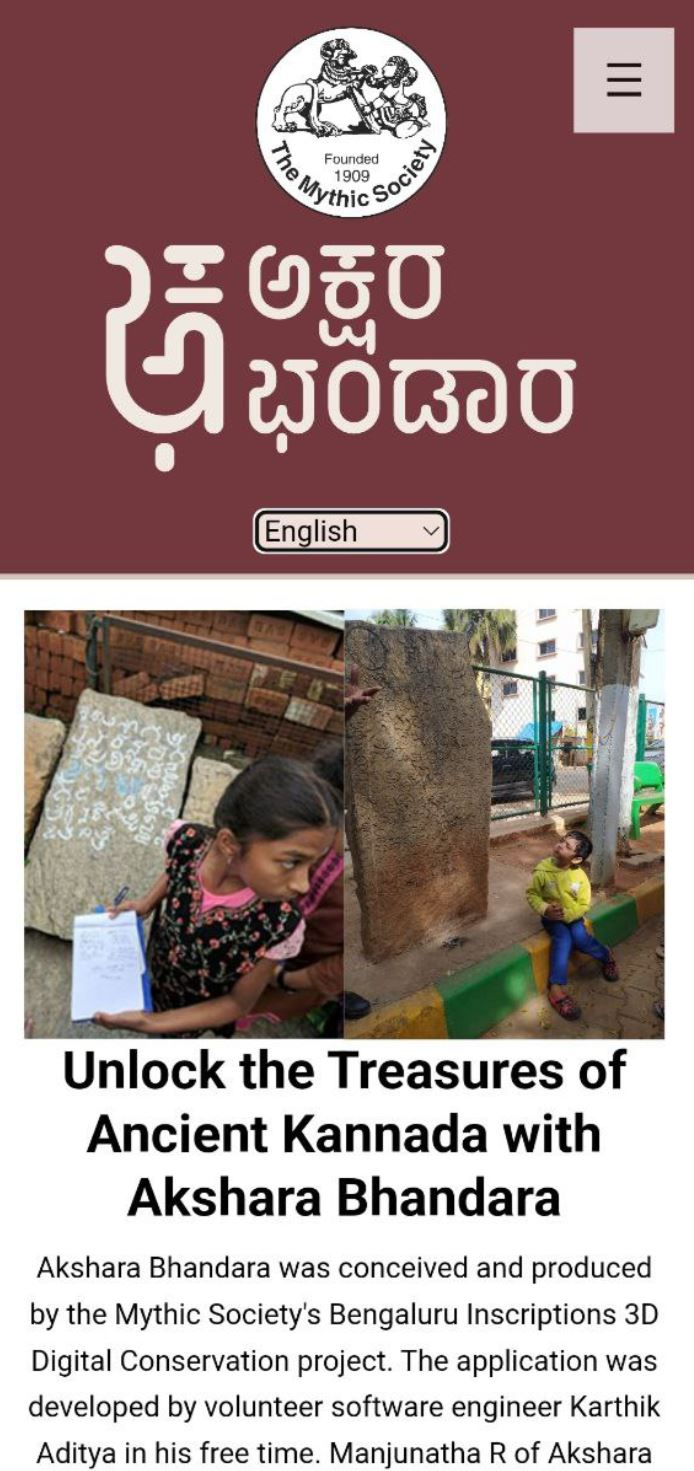
The Aksharabhanadara Software.

Aksharabhandara is a software application designed for the study and exploration of historical inscriptions and letter forms, with a focus on ancient Kannada scripts. Developed by Karthik Aditya, the application provides a comprehensive database of over 30,000 images of individual letters and complete inscriptions extracted from 3D models of inscription stones in the Bengaluru region.

The Mythic Society showcased Aksharabhandara at the 87th Akhila Bharata Kannada Sahitya Sammelana, where it garnered significant attention from the public and media. Thousands of visitors, including literature lovers, Kannada enthusiasts, and students, interacted with the software, demonstrating a keen interest in learning about and decoding ancient scripts.

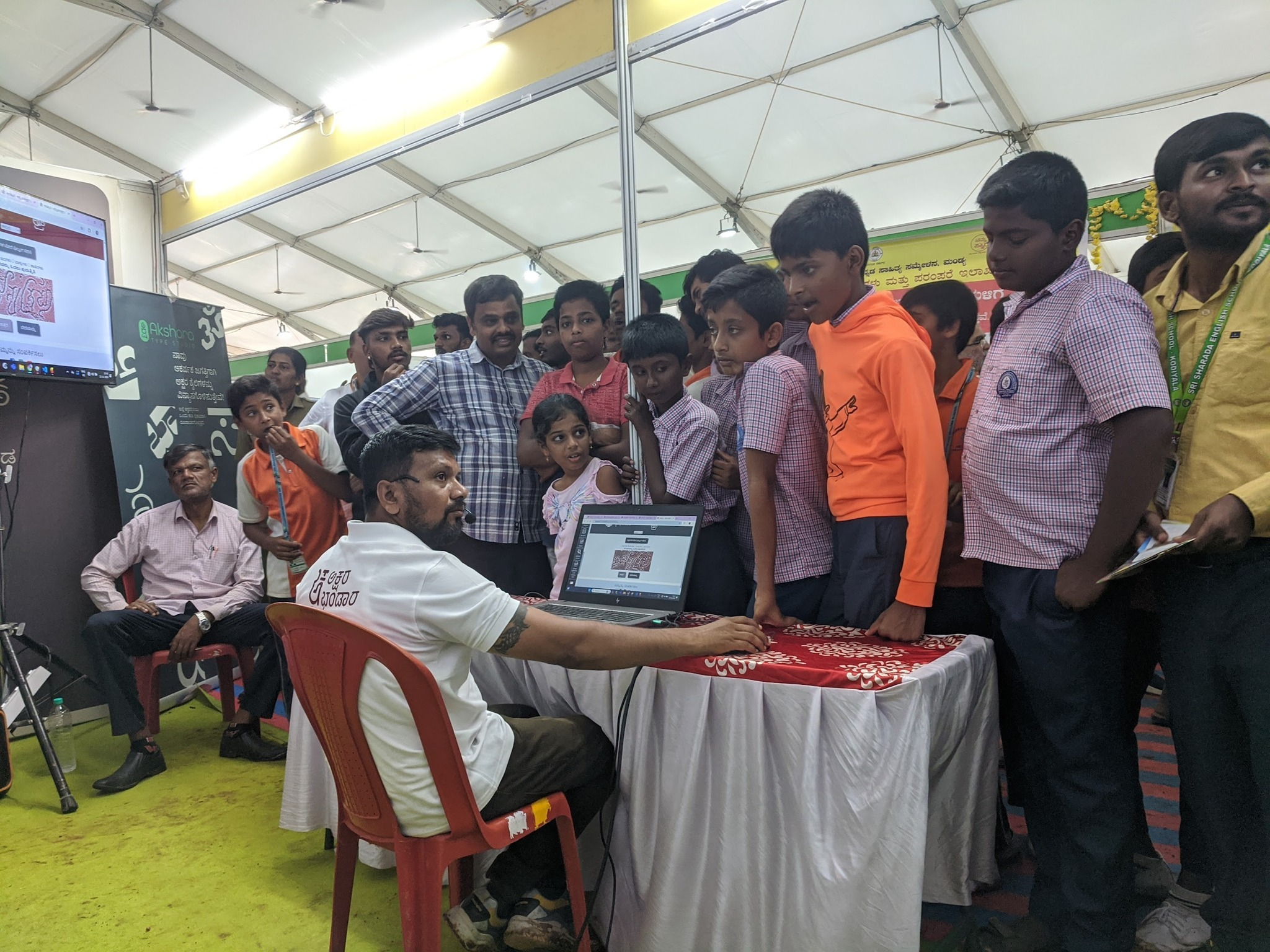
Demonstration of Akshara Bhandara software at the 87th Akhila Bharata Kannada Sahitya Sammelana.

The success of this demonstration, which attracted significant media coverage in publications like Prajavani, Vijay Karnataka, Udayavani, and Samyukta Karnataka, as well as on Zee News Kannada, highlights the potential of Aksharabhandara to make Kannada's rich heritage more accessible to a wider audience.

===== Key features =====
- Extensive Database: Includes over 30,000 images of vowels, consonants, conjunct consonants, numbers, and complete inscriptions.
- Interactive Learning: Features a "Practice" section designed to help users learn and test their knowledge of ancient Kannada scripts.
- 3D Scanning Technology: The application's database is built on 3D scans of hundreds of inscription stones in the Bengaluru region.

===== Development =====
Aksharabhandara was conceived and produced by the Mythic Society's Bengaluru Inscriptions 3D Digital Conservation project. Key contributors include:

- Developer: Karthik Aditya
- Icon Design: Manjunatha R
- Image Extraction: Interns from St. Joseph's University and Kristu Jayanti College, Bengaluru

All digital images within the software are produced and owned by the Mythic Society's Bengaluru Inscriptions 3D Digital Conservation project.

Notes: As of October 2024, Aksharabhandara is in beta release and some features may not function as expected.

==== Kannada Inscription Tools ====
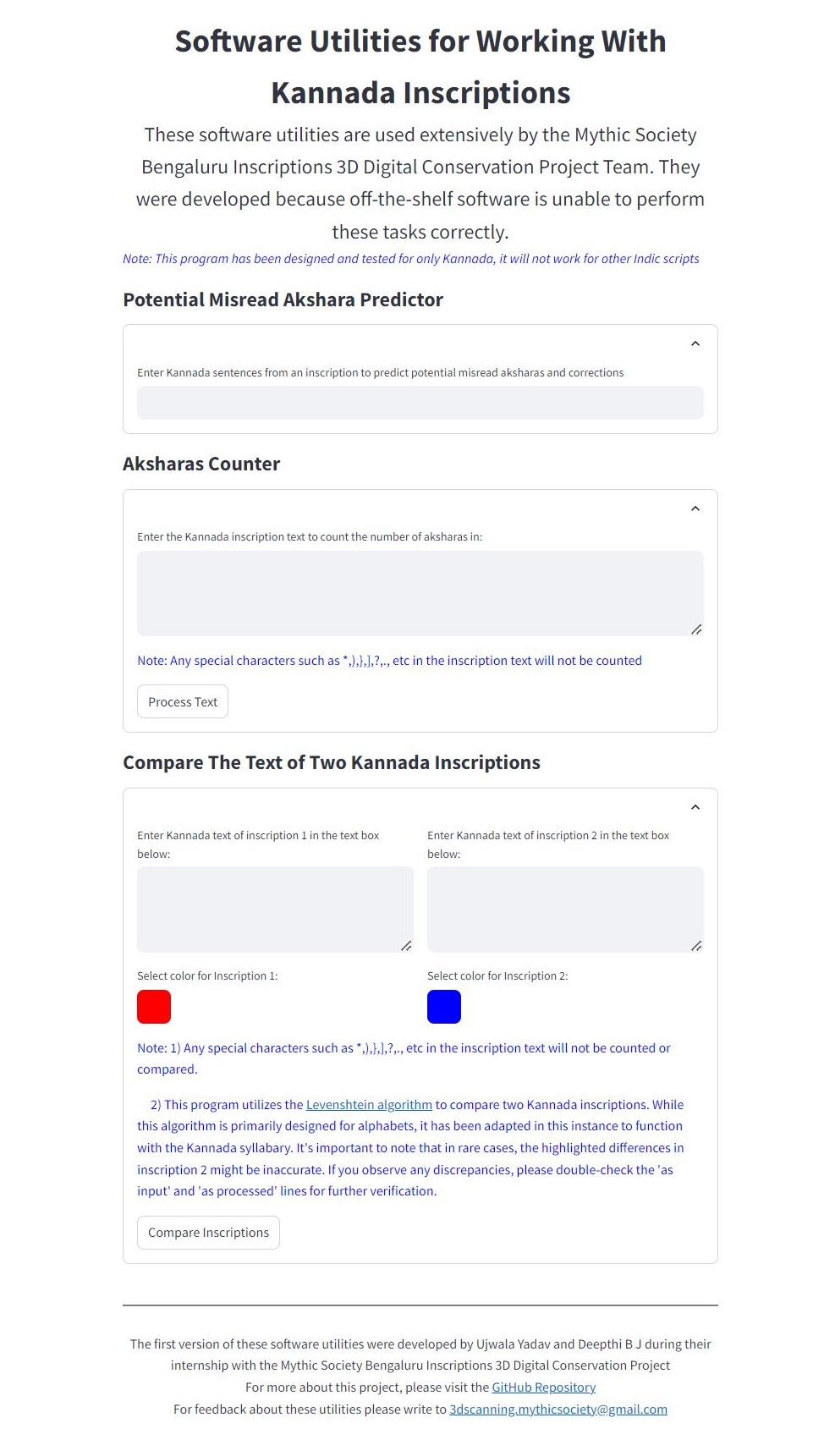
The Kannada Inscription Tool.

Kannada Inscription Tools is a free and open-source web application designed to assist in the study and analysis of Kannada inscriptions. Developed using Streamlit, this user-friendly tool provides a range of features that simplify the process of counting and comparing historical Kannada texts.

===== Features =====
====== Potential misread akshara predictor ======
Based on a thorough study of 200 Bengaluru inscriptions, this tool identifies characters in a Kannada sentence that may have been misread and suggests likely corrections. This feature leverages patterns of misreading identified by the Mythic Society Bengaluru Inscriptions 3D Digital Conservation Project team.

====== Akshara counter ======
Accurately counts the number of Kannada characters in a given text. This is crucial because Kannada's syllabic nature often causes inaccuracies in standard character counting software.

====== Compare two Kannada inscriptions ======
This tool simplifies the process of comparing two versions of an inscription (e.g., an earlier reading and a new reading). By utilizing the Levenshtein distance algorithm, it accurately identifies differences between the texts, reducing the labor and potential for error in manual comparisons.

===== Development =====
These tools were developed by interns Deepthi B J and Ujwala Yadav, MSc Data Science students at NMKRV Women's College, Bengaluru in conjunction with the Mythic Society Bengaluru Inscriptions 3D Digital Conservation Project team.

==== The 'Inscription Stones of Bengaluru' Google Map ====
The 'Inscription Stones of Bengaluru' Google Map was initiated as a citizen project in 2018 and is now actively developed by the Mythic Society's Bengaluru Inscriptions 3D Digital Conservation Team, is a comprehensive online resource documenting nearly 1,500 inscriptions. This map is accessible to everyone with online access through a computer or smartphone and serves as a centralized repository of information, consolidating data from various sources. With features such as a search option, color-coded periods, and detailed information on each inscription, the map is crucial in promoting public engagement with Bengaluru's epigraphic heritage.

Inscriptions documented in all previously mentioned sources as well as newspaper articles, social media, etc., have all been compiled and marked on the map. The map is continuously updated to incorporate additional information and reflect any changes or recent discoveries.

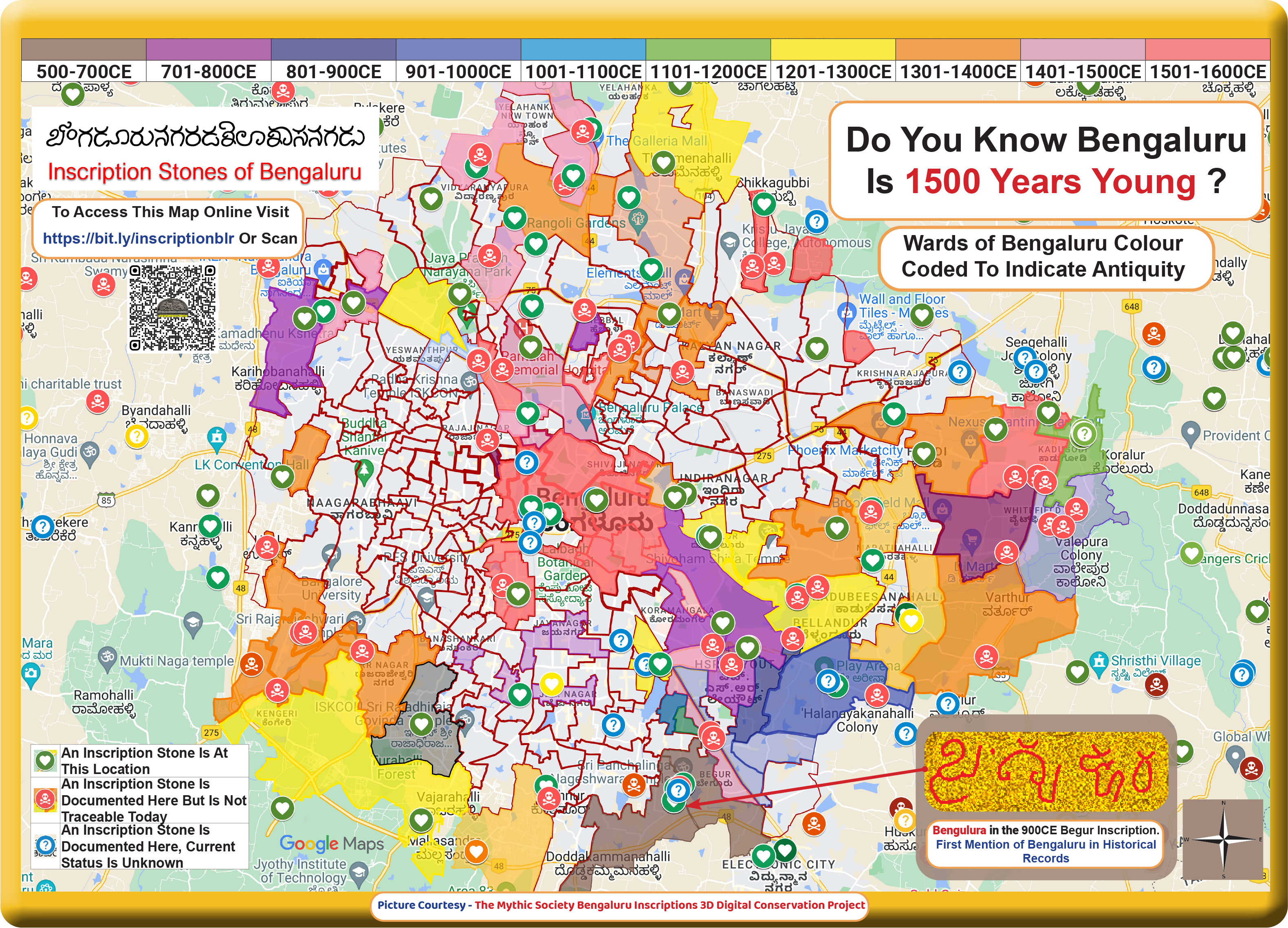
Inscription Stones of Bangalore - Google Map

===== The features of the map =====
The map includes a search option that allows users to find information such as individuals' names, place names, references to lakes, taxes, temples, and other related content within the inscriptions' text.

The map represents various icons to represent Inscriptions:

- Green Heart: which represents that the inscription stone is present at the site
- Red Skull: The Inscription is no longer traceable or might have been vandalized
- Question Mark: The current status of the inscription is not known

By clicking on the icons on the map, an explanation of the information that can be obtained such as

- The Inscription date
- The present status of the inscription which also refers to the physical condition of the inscription, it also includes whether the inscription is intact or damaged
- The English translation of the inscription is also given which provides a readable and understandable version of the text in English.
- The English Transliteration which provides the text of the inscription in the IAST format
- The Kannada transliteration of the inscription is also given which provides a representation of the inscription's text in the Kannada alphabet.
- The documentation source plays a very important role which refers to the publication or record in which the inscription was first documented
- The rereading of the inscription is also given which is done by the team

The map uses a color-coding scheme to represent the different periods from which the inscriptions originate.

This allows users to quickly identify the age of each inscription and gain a general understanding of the chronological distribution of inscriptions across Bengaluru. In addition to the color-coding scheme, the map also includes labels that provide more specific information about the dating of each inscription. The color scheme is as follows:

- Brown: 500-700CE
- Purple: 700-800CE
- Dark Violet: 800-900CE
- Light Violet: 900-1000CE
- Blue: 1000-1100CE
- Green: 11001200CE
- Yellow: 1200-1300CE
- Orange: 1300-1400CE
- Lavender: 1400-1500CE
- Pink: 1500-1600CE
