= Belathur =

- Locality
- Country: India
- State: Karnataka
- District: Bangalore Urban

Government
  - Type: Congress
  - Body: Congress(BBMP)

Languages
  - Official: Kannada
- Time zone: UTC+5:30 (IST)
- ISO 3166 code: IN-KA
- Vehicle registration: KA
- Website: karnataka.gov.in

Belathur is a locality in the eastern part of Bangalore.
