= Karaga =

Karaga may refer to:

- Karaga (festival), folk dance of Tamil Nadu and Karnataka
- Karaga people, geographical subgroup of the Koryaks who live in Kamchatka
- Karaga District, Northern Region, Ghana
  - Karaga, Ghana, the capital city of the Karaga district
  - Karaga (Ghana parliament constituency), located in the district
- Karaga, alternate name for Qareh Qayeh, Meyaneh, village in East Azerbaijan Province, Iran
- Karaga, a variety of the Mandaya language
- Bangalore Karaga, festival held in Bangalore City, Karnataka State, India
- Karaga Attam or Karakattam, ancient Tamil folk art dance
- Caraga, administrative region in the Philippines
- Karaga, a Sydney K-class ferry
