= Bonalu =

Annual Hindu festival

Bonalu (బోనాలు)
- Woman with Bonam
- Official name: Bonalu
- Observed by: Hindus of Telangana
- Type: Festival of Deccan Shakti-Shaivite tradition
- Significance: Folk festival dedicated to Goddess Mahakali
- Celebrations: Ritual processions, folk performances, and future-telling oracles
- Observances: Offerings to Goddess Mahakali and folk dances
- Begins: 16 July 2026
- Ends: 13 August 2026
- Duration: 1 Month
- Frequency: Annual
- Related to: Festivals in India, Hinduism in Telangana

Bonalu (Telugu: బోనాలు, romanized: Bōnālu) is a traditional festival centred on the Hindu goddess Mahakali from Telangana. This festival is celebrated annually in the twin cities of Hyderabad and Secunderabad, as well as in other parts of the state. It is celebrated in the month of Ashada Masam, which is from July to August. Special pujas are performed for Yellamma (one of the many regional forms of Mahakali) on the first and last day of the festival. The festival is also considered a thanksgiving to Mahakali for fulfillment of vows.

== History ==
The origin of this festival can be traced back to the 19th century in the erstwhile Hyderabad State, and is linked with the "Regimental Bazaar" and the twin cities of Hyderabad and Secunderabad. In the year 1813, a plague broke out in the twin cities, and this took the lives of thousands of people. Just before this, a military battalion from Hyderabad had been deployed to Ujjain, Madhya Pradesh. When this military battalion from Hyderabad got news that the epidemic had hit their native land, they became fearful for the lives and safety of their families. The soldiers posted in Ujjaini prayed to the goddess at the Mahakali Temple in Ujjain. The battalion is said to have prayed to Mahakali to kill the plague, and if the goddess did so, they would install an idol of Mahakali in the city when they returned home. It is believed that Mahakali destroyed the disease and kept the pestilence away. When the battalion returned to their homeland, they built the Ujjaini Mahakali Temple and installed an idol of the goddess, in fulfilment of their vow. This was followed by the offering of Bonalu to the Goddess.

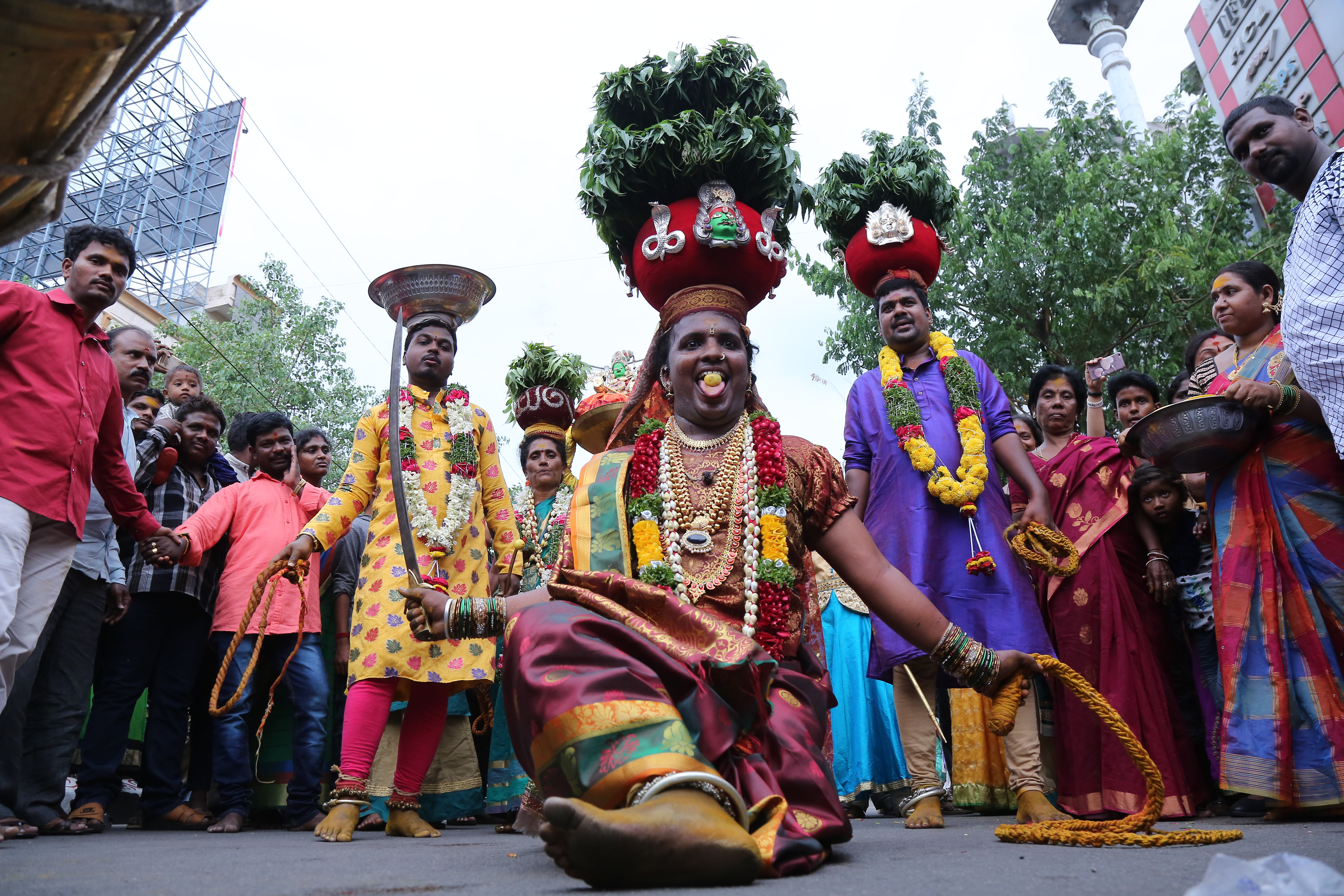
Bonalu celebrations, Hyderabad.

== Bonam ==
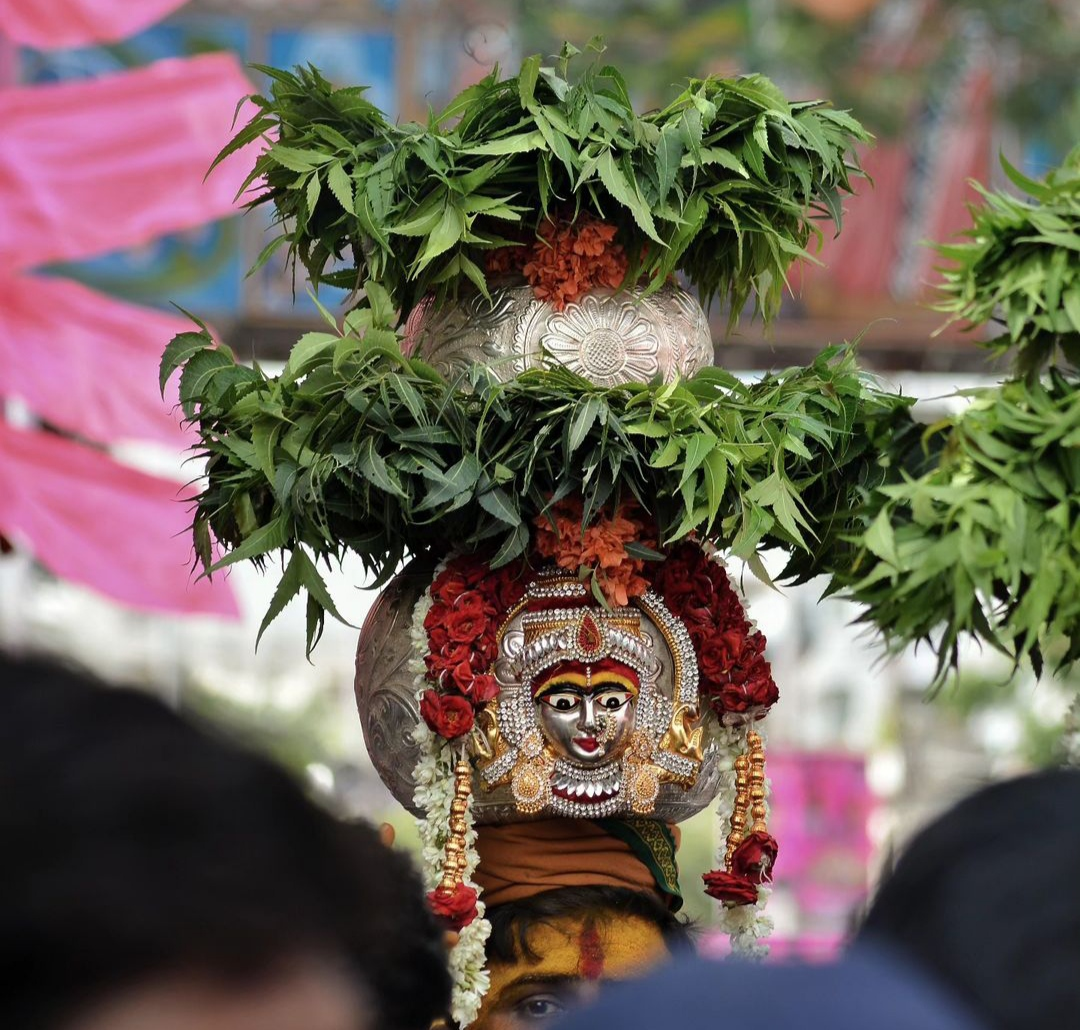

The word bōnāṁ is the vikriti (folk form) of the word bhōjanaṁ (prakriti) which means 'meal' or 'feast' in Sanskrit. It is an offering to Goddess Mahakali. Women prepare rice cooked with milk and jaggery in a new brass or earthen pot and decorate it with turmeric, vermilion and wrap neem leaves around the neck of the pot.

A Raja bonam being prepared in a temple, Hyderabad

A sweet jaggery beverage (panakam) is prepared and poured into a small clay cup. An earthen lamp is placed on top of the bonam. It is then carried on top of the head by women and presented along with silk saree to Goddess Mahakali, village deities as an offering to protect the people from diseases and epidemics. After offering the bonam to deities, it is then consumed by the devotees as prasadam.

Woman carrying bonam.

A traditional Bonam

== Pothuraju ==
Pothuraju wielding a dual thick whip.

According to mythology, Potharaju is the brother of Mahakali. His role is played in the procession by a well-built, bare-bodied man, wearing a small tightly draped red dhoti, bells on his ankles, face paint highlighting his eyes and expression, anointed with turmeric on his body and vermilion on his forehead. He dances to resounding drums in the procession.

Pothuraju(s) at the Golconda fort, Hyderabad.

Potharaju always dances in front of the Palaharam Bandi, i.e., the procession. He is considered the initiator of the festivities and the protector of the community. He is accompanied by trumpets and drums and possesses a whip that he cracks in the air and against himself to ward off evil and leads the female devotees who dance in a trance state (known as shigam) with neem leaves tied at their waists, to the temple.

A traditional Pothuraju

== Rangam ==
Rangam programme with an oracle under trance state, Hyderabad.

Rangam (Oracle ritual), is held the next morning of the festival. A woman standing atop of an earthen pot invokes Goddess Mahakali onto her and performs the custom. She foretells the year ahead for the devotees asking about the future. This ceremony takes place inside the temple just before the ghatam procession begins.

== Ghatam ==
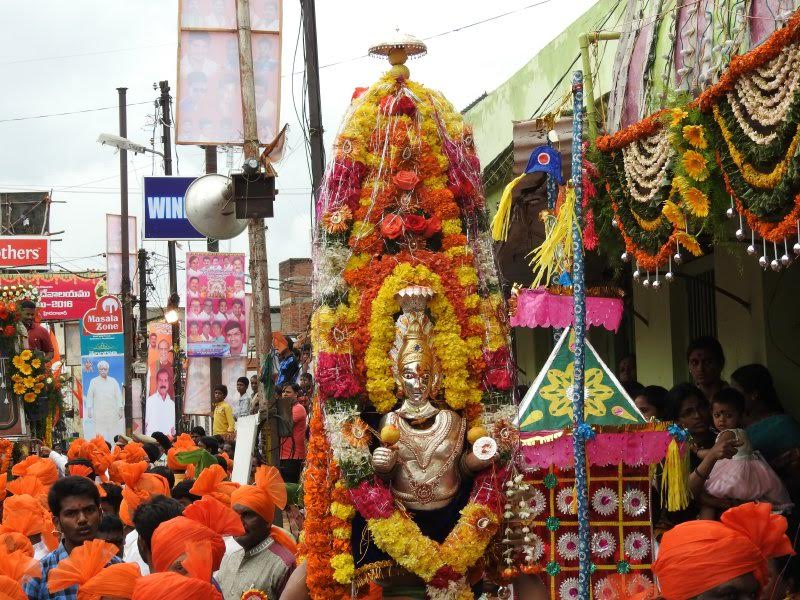
Ghatam with Prabhavali and Mukhamukham. Draped with silk saree and covered in flower garlands, Lal Darwaza, Hyderabad.

Ghatam (not to be confused with bonam) is a sacred, decorated copper or brass pot that represents the physical embodiment of Goddess Mahakali. On the first day of celebrations, the priest decorates the pot with turmeric, vermilion, neem leaves, flowers and silk cloth and reads mantras to invoke the presence of Goddess into the pot. This Ghatam is placed on the head of a priest or bearer. It is paraded through the streets from the first day of the festival until the last day and usually accompanied by drummers and trumpets. Residents wash the feet of the priest or bearer and offer prayers at their doorstep(gadapa) to welcome Goddess Mahakali. Ghatam is heavily decorated with artisan frame on top of the pot and is covered in flower garlands.

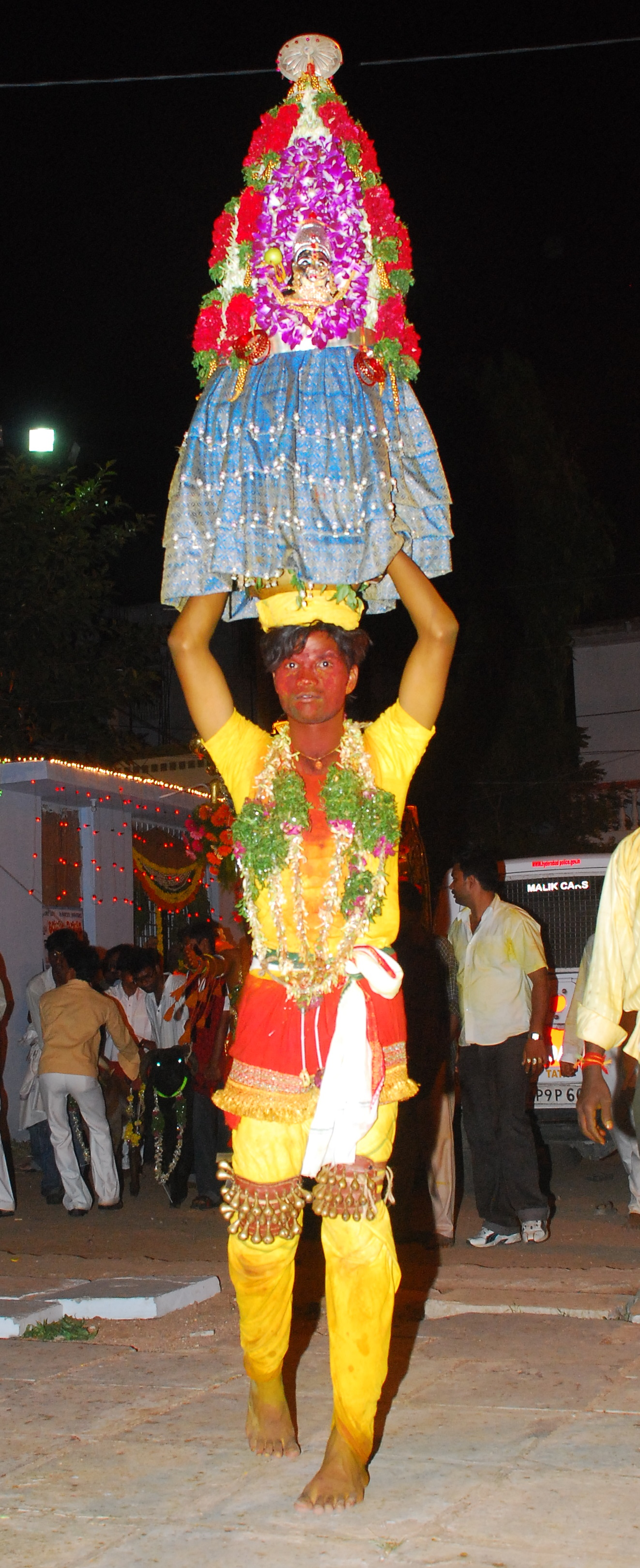
A performer carrying traditional Ghatam

The festival concludes with immersion of the Ghatam. The Ghatam of Haribowli's Akkanna Madanna Temple leads the procession, placed atop an elephant and accompanied by mounted horses and models depicting Akkanna and Madanna. It ends in the evening with a glittering procession and display of much pomp and show followed by immersion of Ghatams at Nayapul.

== Gallery ==

Pothuraju with face paint.

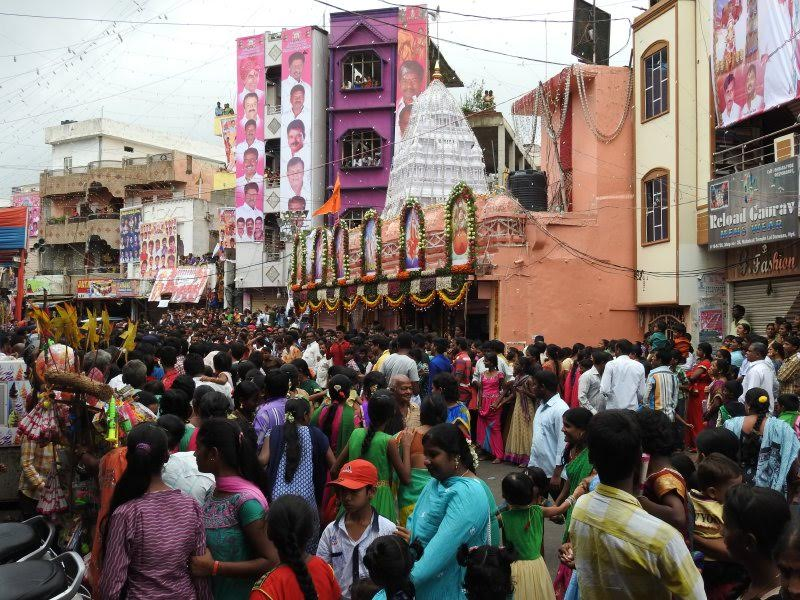

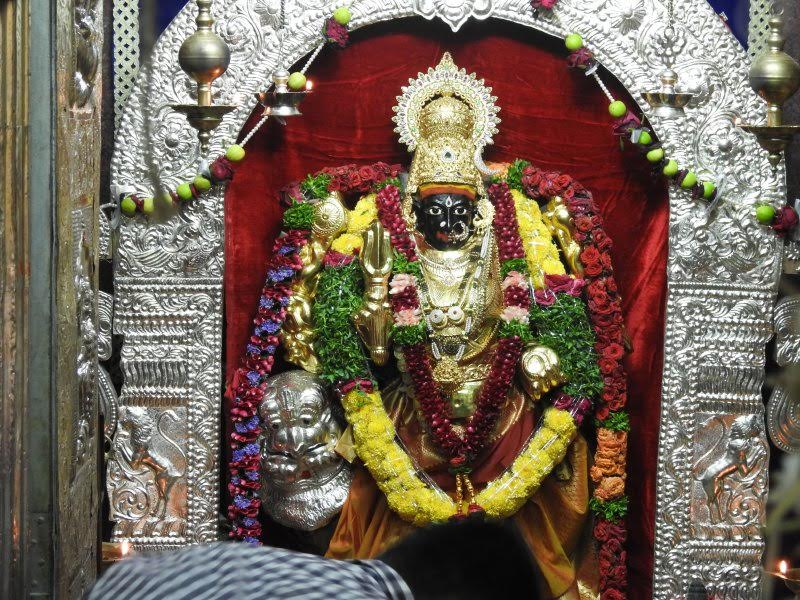

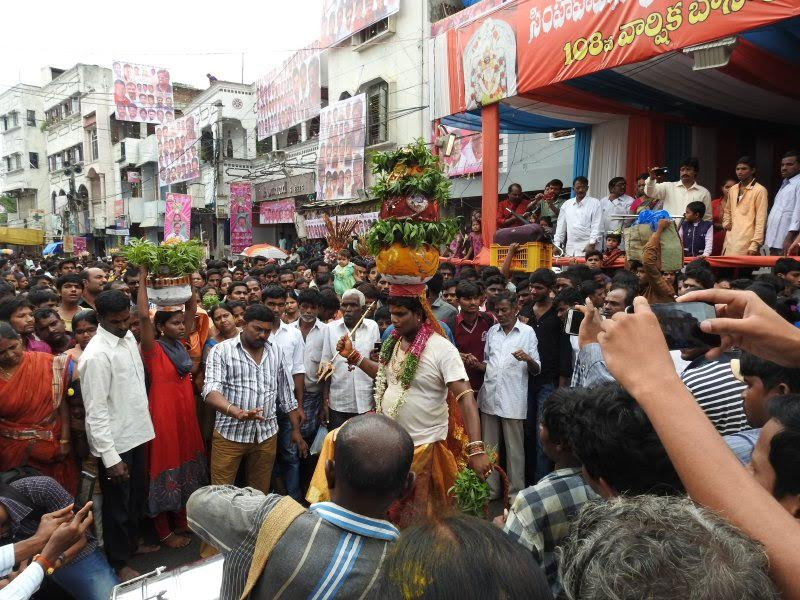

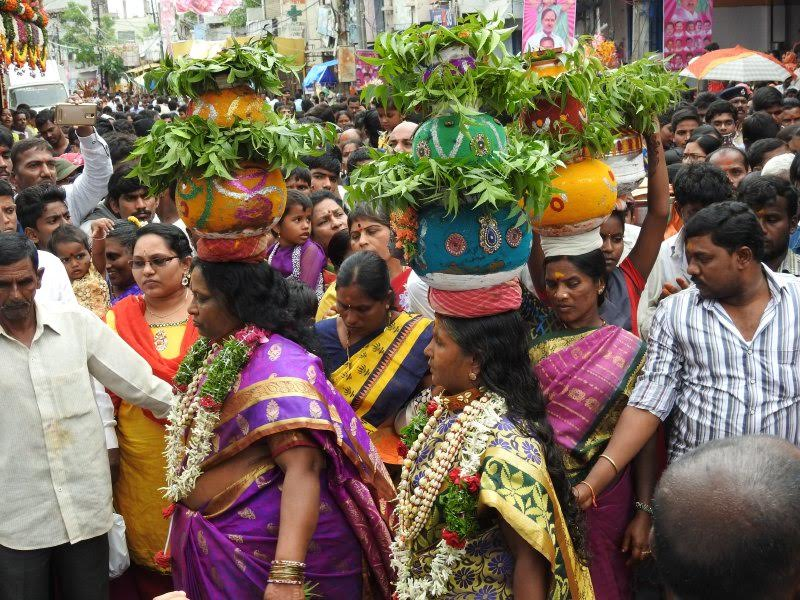

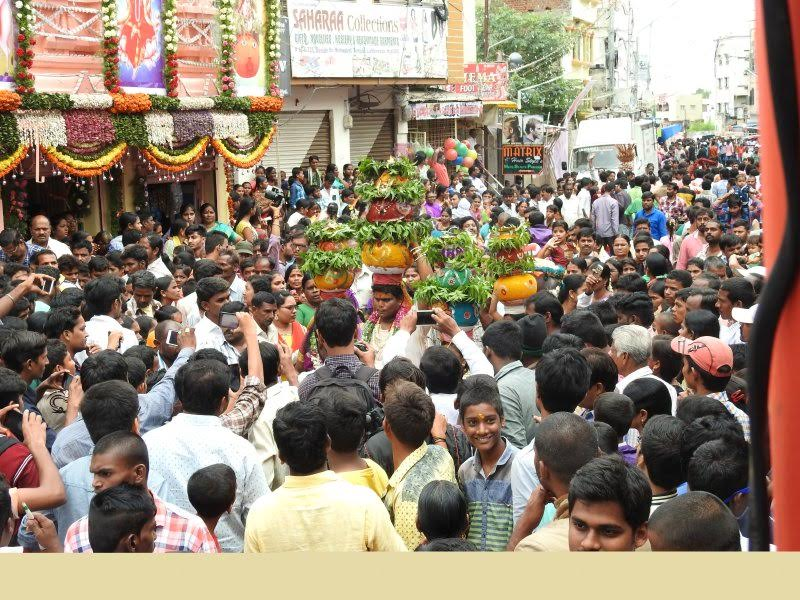

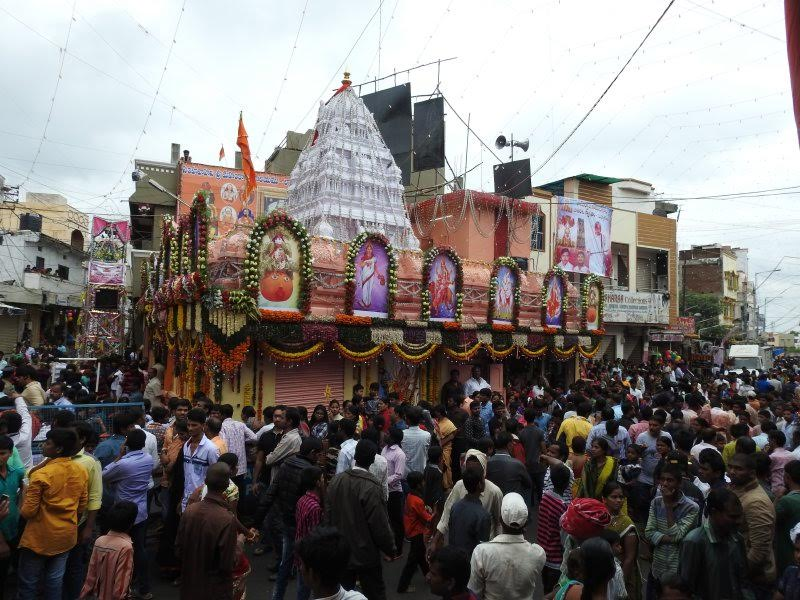

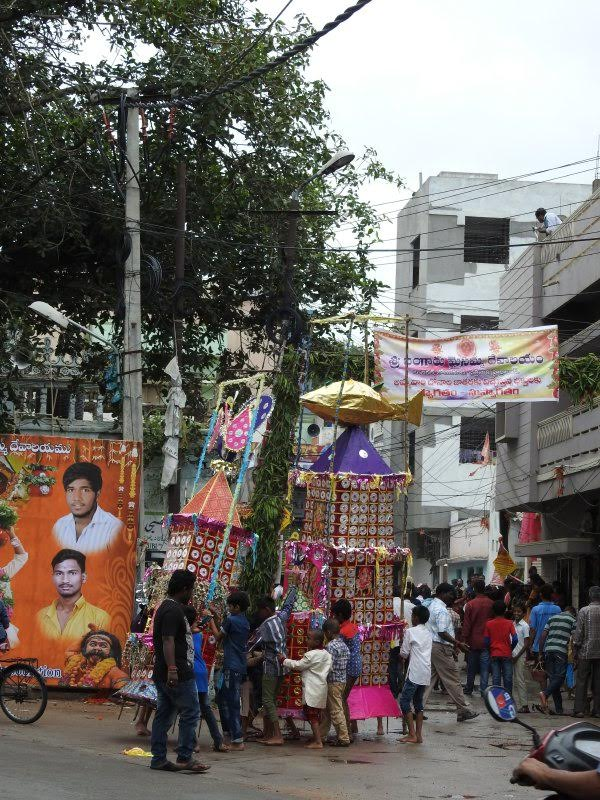

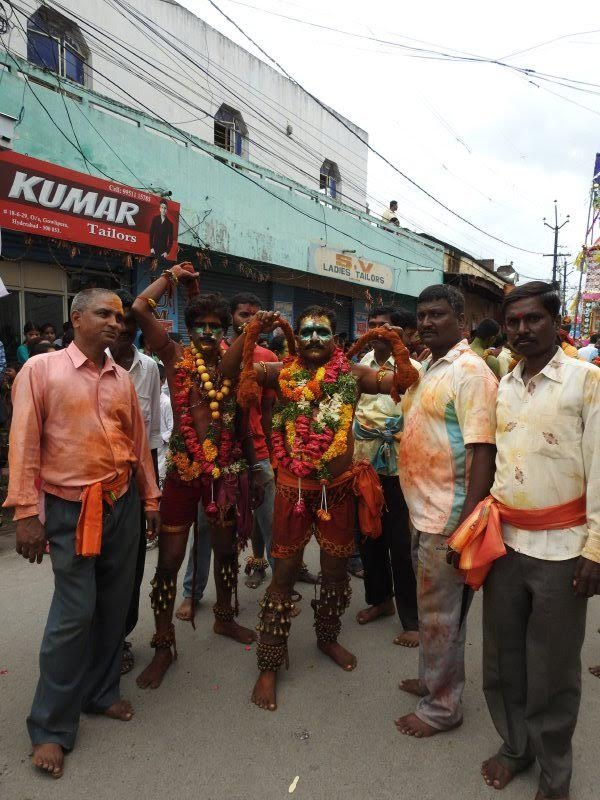

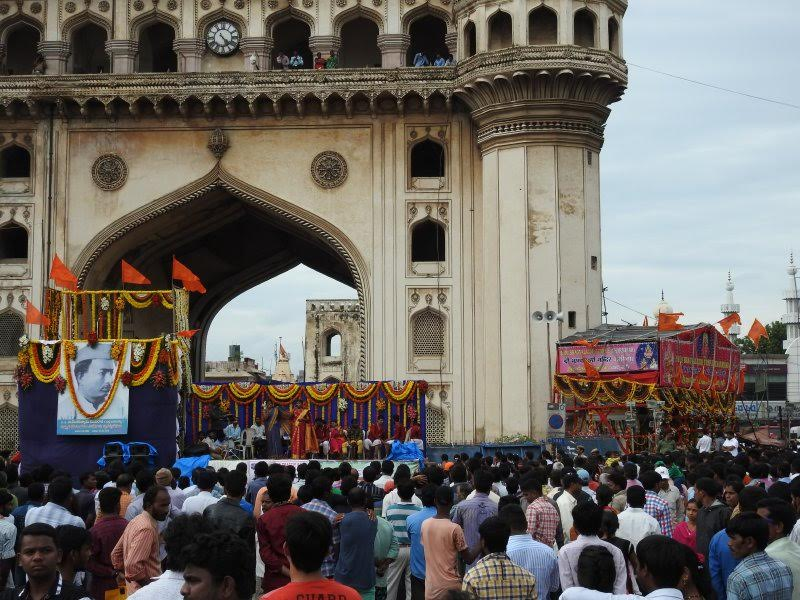

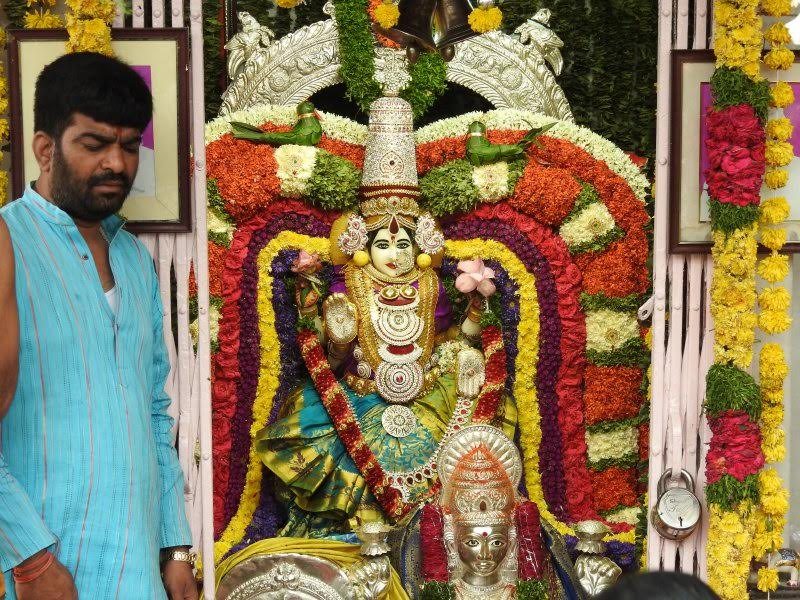

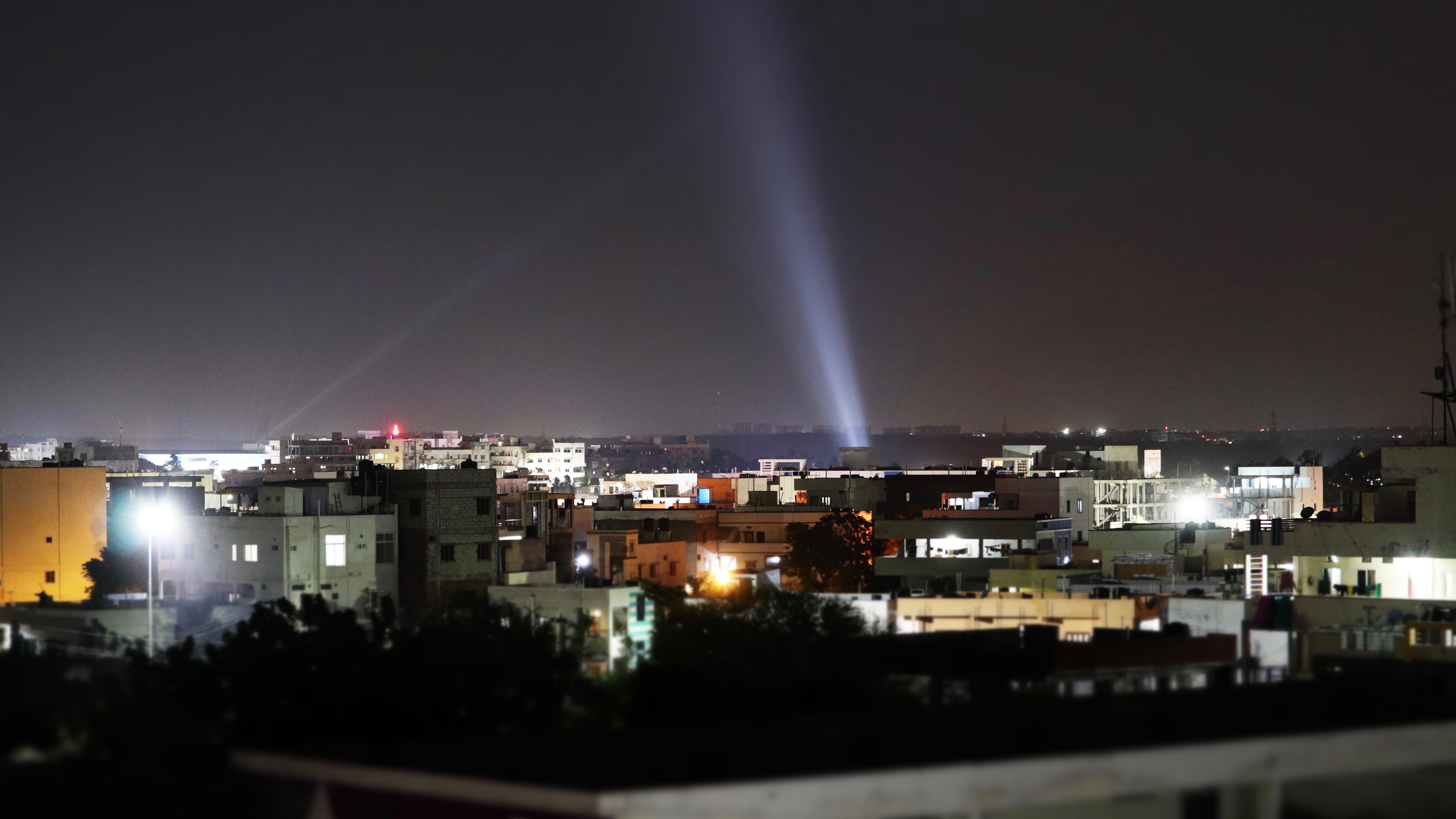
Lighting across the Uppal during Bonalu festival

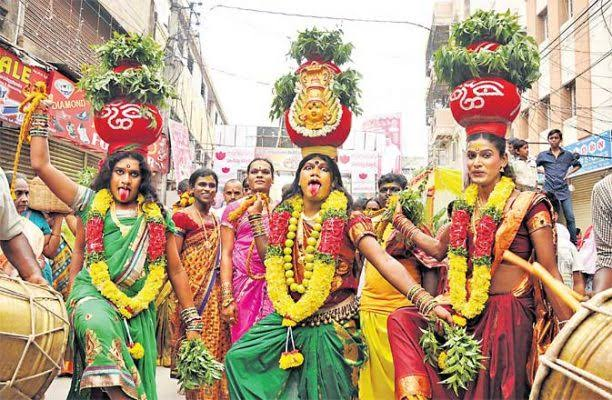

== See also ==
- Bathukamma
- Sammakka Saralamma Jatara
- Grama devata
- Mariamman
- Karagam
- Shaktism
