= Akkanna Madanna Temple =

Coordinates: 17.3753°N 78.4744°E

- అక్కన్న మాదన్న మహాకాళి గుడి
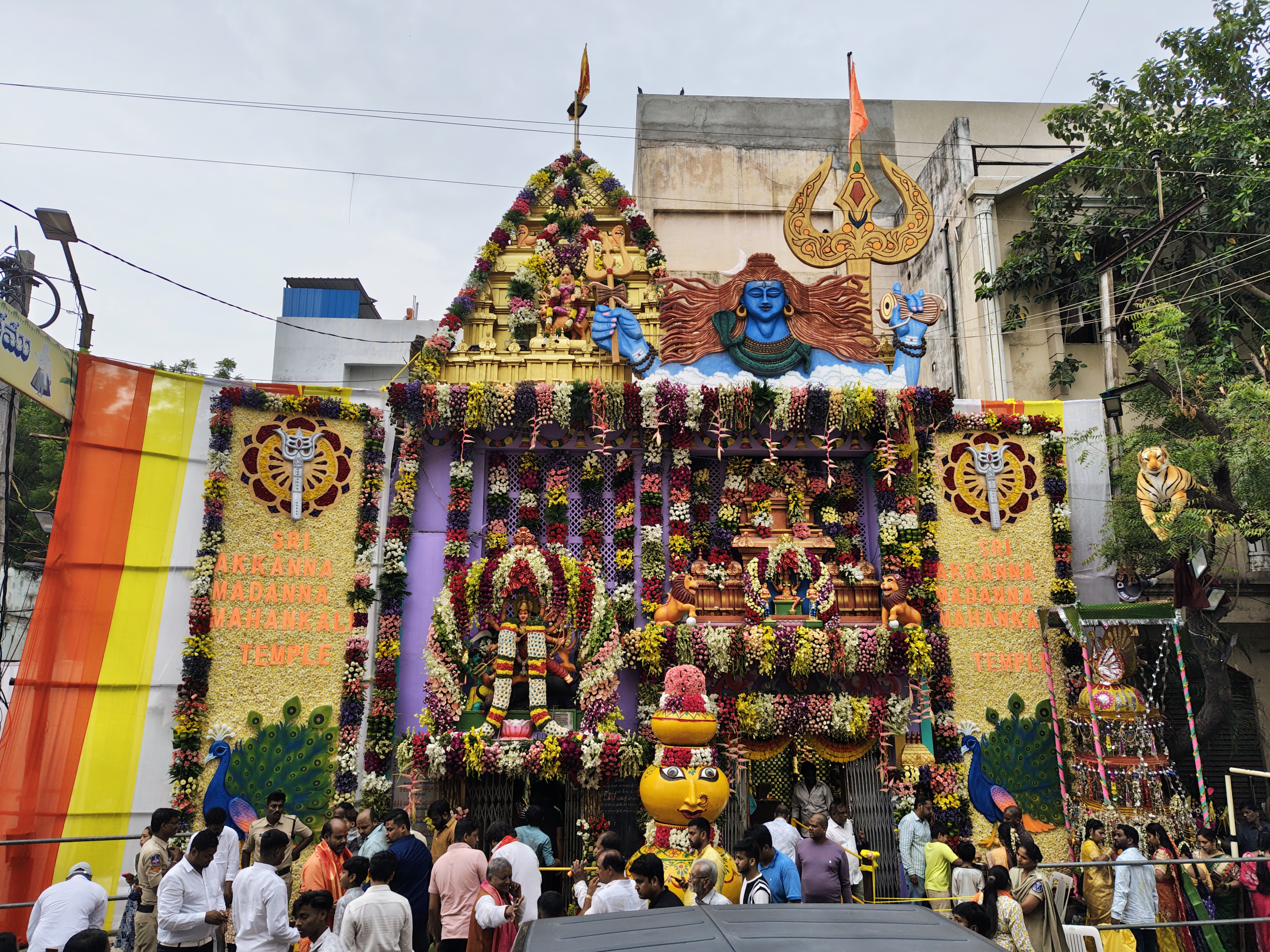

Religion
- Affiliation: Hinduism
- Deity: Mahankali
- Festival: Bonalu

Location
- Location: near Shah-Ali-Banda, Hyderabad
- State: Telangana
- Country: India
- Interactive map of Akkanna Madanna Temple

Architecture
- Creator: Madanna and Akkanna
- Completed: 17th century

Akkanna Madanna Temple is a Hindu temple located in Hyderabad, Telangana, India. It is popular during the festival of Bonalu that is celebrated in the twin cities of Hyderabad and Secunderabad. The temple is known for the Ghatam procession during Bonalu.

== History ==
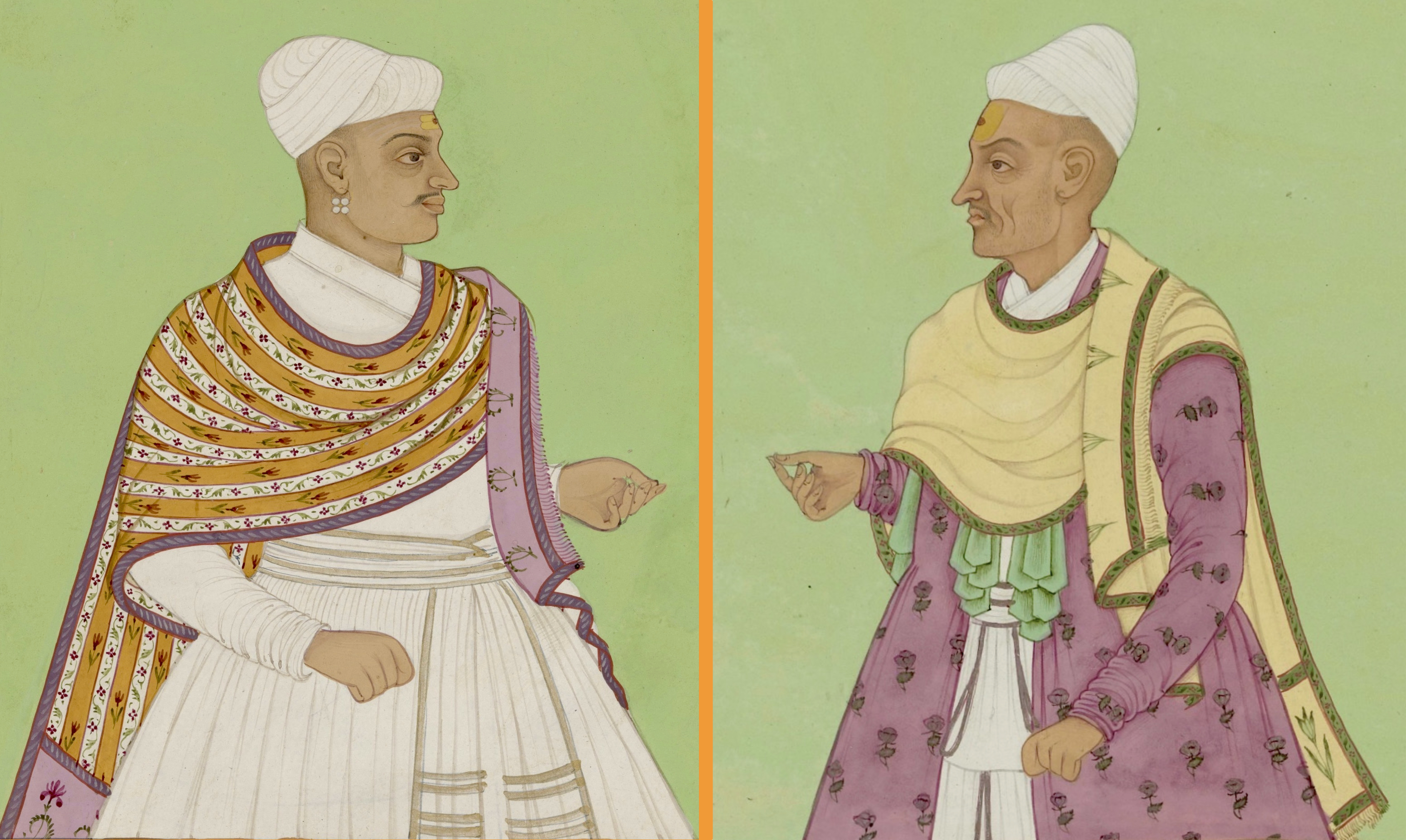
Akkanna and Madanna brothers, ministers in Golconda Sultanate

During the early 17th century, the city of Hyderabad was ruled by King Tana Shah. He was the Emperor at Golkonda fort. The royal king had many ministers at his court of which Madanna and Akkanna both were brothers served as the Commander-in-Chief and Prime Minister, respectively. These two brothers were one of the favourite ministers of the king and stayed in a house near his own, where the temple of Mahankali existed. Being the true disciples of Goddess Mahankali, Akkanna and Madanna performed pooja every day at the holy temple before they left for the court of Golconda for their day's work. Soon after the killing of these two brothers, the temple was closed.

It has been more than sixty-seven years since the temple has been revived from the debris of Hari bowli at Shah Ali Banda. Before the temple was rejuvenated, very few people in the Old City had knowledge of the existence of this temple. Ever since, the temple of the great Mahankali has seen the light of day in the vibrant Old City.

=== 1998 Attacks ===
In the year 1998, the temple was attacked by a Muslim mob headed by AIMIM leader Akbaruddin Owaisi and partly destroyed the idol and temple belongings.

== Architecture ==
The temple is built as per Hindu traditions and architectural styles. The pillars, walls and ceiling of the temple has carvings and inscription of god and goddess and their related stories. The temple premise has several small temples within it and the main tower has images of major and minor Gods and Goddess.

== Religious significance ==
The Akkanna Madanna Temple is very popular and known among the devotees of Mahakali. In this temple, lot of poojas, archna take place as per the Hindu traditions and customs with great perfection. Most of the rules and regulations suggested in Vedas are followed in this temple of Mahakali. Devotees of Mahakali visit this temple daily in order to fulfil their wishes in their personal and professional life and to get blessed by Mahakali.

== Location ==
The temple is located in Shah-Ali-Banda, Old City, Hyderabad in Telangana state of India, The temple is at a distance of 1 kilometre from Charminar.

== See also ==
- Akkana Madanna cave temple
- Ujjaini Mahakali Temple
- Bhagyalakshmi Temple
- Ashtalakshmi Temple, Hyderabad
