= Jakkasandra =

Jakkasandra is a locality in Bangalore, Karnataka, India. Located in the center of Koramangala and HSR Layout areas, it is one of the largest neighborhoods, alongside the Agara village, Venkatapura, Sreenivagilu, Ejipura, Madiwala, Kattalipalya, Mesthripalya, and Koramangala village. Jakkasandra is also home to many educational institutions such as the Hottekullappa Government School, the Goldwyn Memorial Public School, and the Asia Pacific World High School.

== Festivals of Jakkasandra ==
Jakkasandra Shree AadiShakti draupadamma Karaga Bangalore Karaga utsava, Shree Renuka Yallamma & Shree Venugopala Swamy, and Shree Muneshwara swamy Pallakki Jathre Mahotsava is celebrated every year, on the second Saturday of April.

== History of Jakkasandra ==
The history of Jakkasandra dates back many thousands of years. References are found in the Bangalore archaeological department, and ancient inscriptions can be found in Jakkasandra. Lord Shree Venugopala Swami Temple contains inscriptions referring to the Ganga Dynasty of Talkad, having presided over the construction of the temple.

== Temples ==
- Shree MahaGanapathi Temple
- Shree Venugopala Swami Temple
- Shree Muneshwara Swami Temple
- Shree Renuka Yellamma Devi Temple
- Shree Savadatti Yellamma Devi Temple
- Shree Kateramma Devi Temple
- Shree Maramma Devi Temple
- Shree Sapalamma Devi Temple
- Shree Kaveramma Devi temple
- Shree Lakshminarasimha Swami Temple
- Shree Shiradi SaiBaba Swami Temple
- Shree Om Shakti Temple

== Jakkasandra Lake ==
Jakkasandra Lake is in the center of Koramangala 3rd block and Koramangala 4th block areas. Near to the Jakkasandra block are the Koramangala BDA Complex and Mesthri Palya areas.

== Jakkasandra ward (BBMP Ward No 173) ==
- Population (2011) 24,088 comprising 13,045 males and 11,043 females
- Area in km^{2} 1.5
- Assembly Constituency ||BTM Layout
- MLA Ramalinga Reddy
- MP Tejaswi Surya
- Corporator Saraswathamma
