= Dharmaraya Swamy Temple =

Hindu temple in Bangalore, India

- Front view of the temple

- Location in Bangalore

Religion
- Affiliation: Hinduism
- District: Bangalore Urban district
- Deity: Draupadi, Pandavas, Krishna
- Festival: Bangalore Karaga

Location
- State: Karnataka
- Country: India
- Interactive map of Dharmaraya Swamy Temple
- Coordinates: 12.9654°N 77.5834°E

Architecture
- Type: Hindu temple architecture

Shri Dharmaraya Swamy Temple is one of the oldest and most famous Hindu temples of the city of Bengaluru, in Karnataka, India.

== History ==
The Dharmaraya Swamy Temple was built over eight hundred years ago by the Vahni Kula Kshatriyas going back to the Chalukya dynasty; King Someshwara is mentioned in a stone inscription at Hottal taluk, Nanded district, Maharashtra. The community continued in Bengaluru as one of the area's oldest social groups, an agricultural community who tilled the soil and grew vegetables and flowers.

== Temple architecture ==
The temple displays architectural features of buildings from the Western Ganga dynasty, the Pallava dynasty, and the Vijayanagara Empire. The temple may be more than 800 years old, the first buildings having been in existence before the current city of Bangalore was founded in 1530 by Kempe Gowda I, when he built a mud fort here. The temple is built in the Dravidian style, with a gopuram, an ornate monumental entrance tower. Deities worshipped here include Dharmaraya, Krishna, Arjuna, Draupadi, Nakula, Sahadeva and Bhima. The Karaga festival is celebrated during the months of March and April.

== Karaga festival ==
The Karaga festival starts from the temple each year. This street procession is led by a priest, dressed as a woman, who carries the "karaga", an enormous clay pot on his head and dances through the streets of the old city, in a ritual dedicated to Draupadi.The ritual is performed on the day of the full moon day. The ritual pot filled with water and adorned with decorations several feet high is carried by the priest, while dancers perform various acrobatic feats while following the procession accompanied by a number of musical instruments. The rituals have their origin in the Mahabharata, particularly in the vastrakshepa (stripping) of Draupadi, the exile of the Pandavas and the death of Draupadi's sons at the hands of Ashwathama. After all these trials and tribulations, she emerged as a symbol of strong and ideal womanhood.

Gowdas, Ganacharyas and Chakridaararu are the ordained sects among the Vahnikula Kshatriyas to carry the tradition of conducting the Karaga. Chakridararu are those who perform the various pooja activities at the time of Karaga. These include the ghante poojaris, who are the gurus and carry out the temple rituals, the family of the Karaga priest, the descendants from the clan of Potaraja, Banka Poojari (announcers of the Karaga) and Kolkararu (messengers). These five families have a Kula purohita (clan priest), who is a Brahmin. He performs rituals as per the shastras (sacred texts). All the rituals are steeped in secrecy. Overall management and supervision of the festivities is done by Ganacharyas. All these categories of functionaries are supervised by the Gowdas, who ensure smooth functioning.

On April 9, 2009, Shankar Narayan, as president of the Dharmaraya Swamy temple trust and Karaga festivities, became the first woman to lead the festival carrying the ritual pot.

== Gallery ==
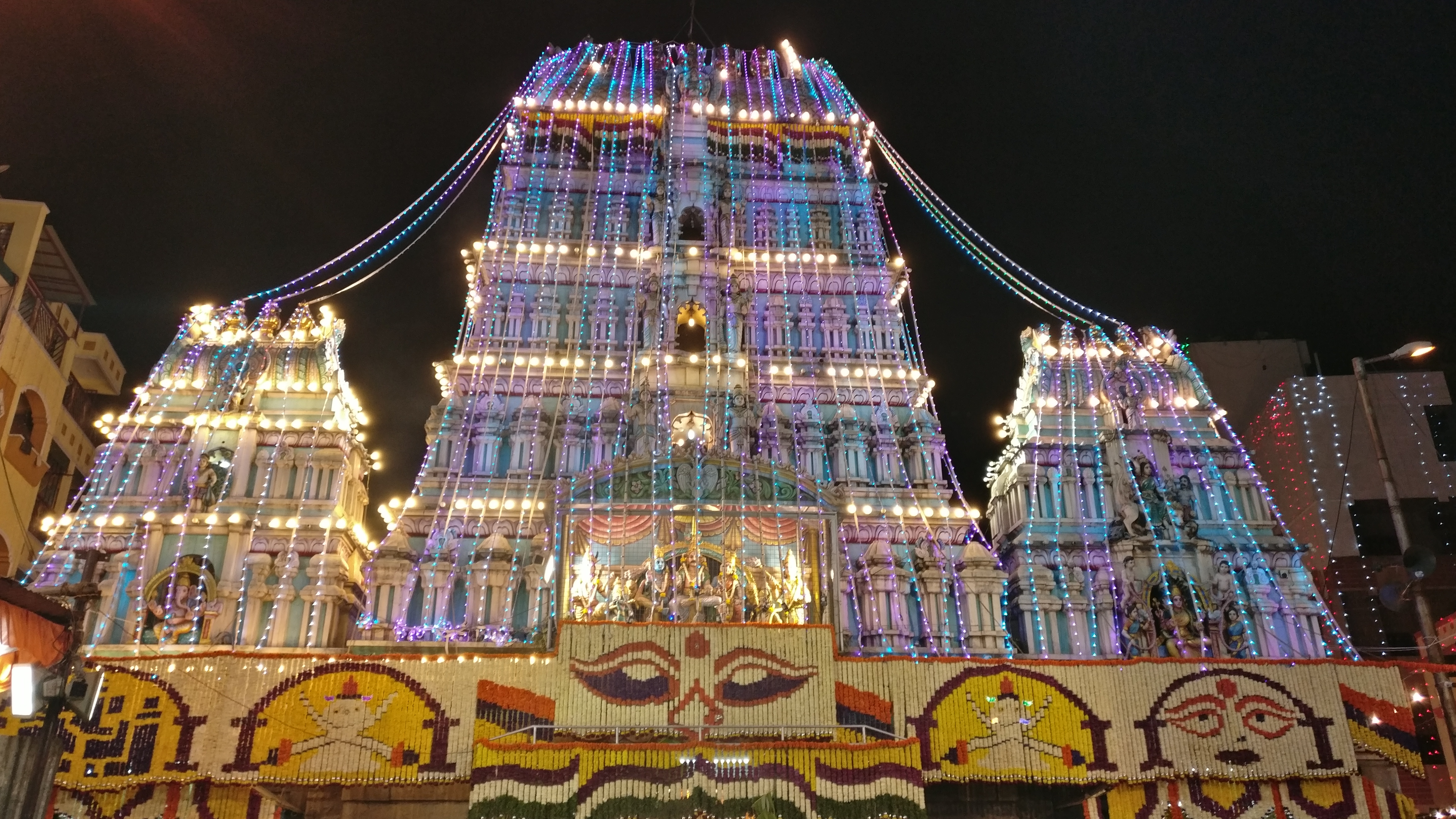
Dharmaraya Swami temple during festivals.

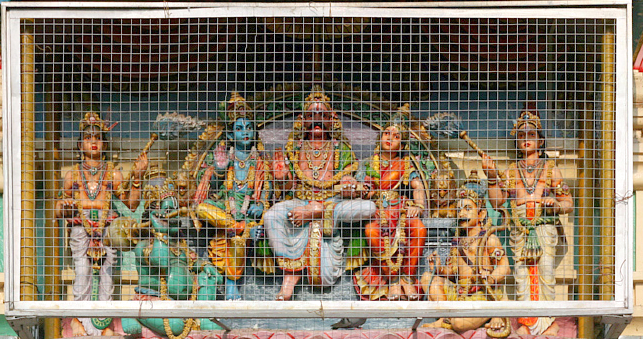
Pandavas with Krishna in temple

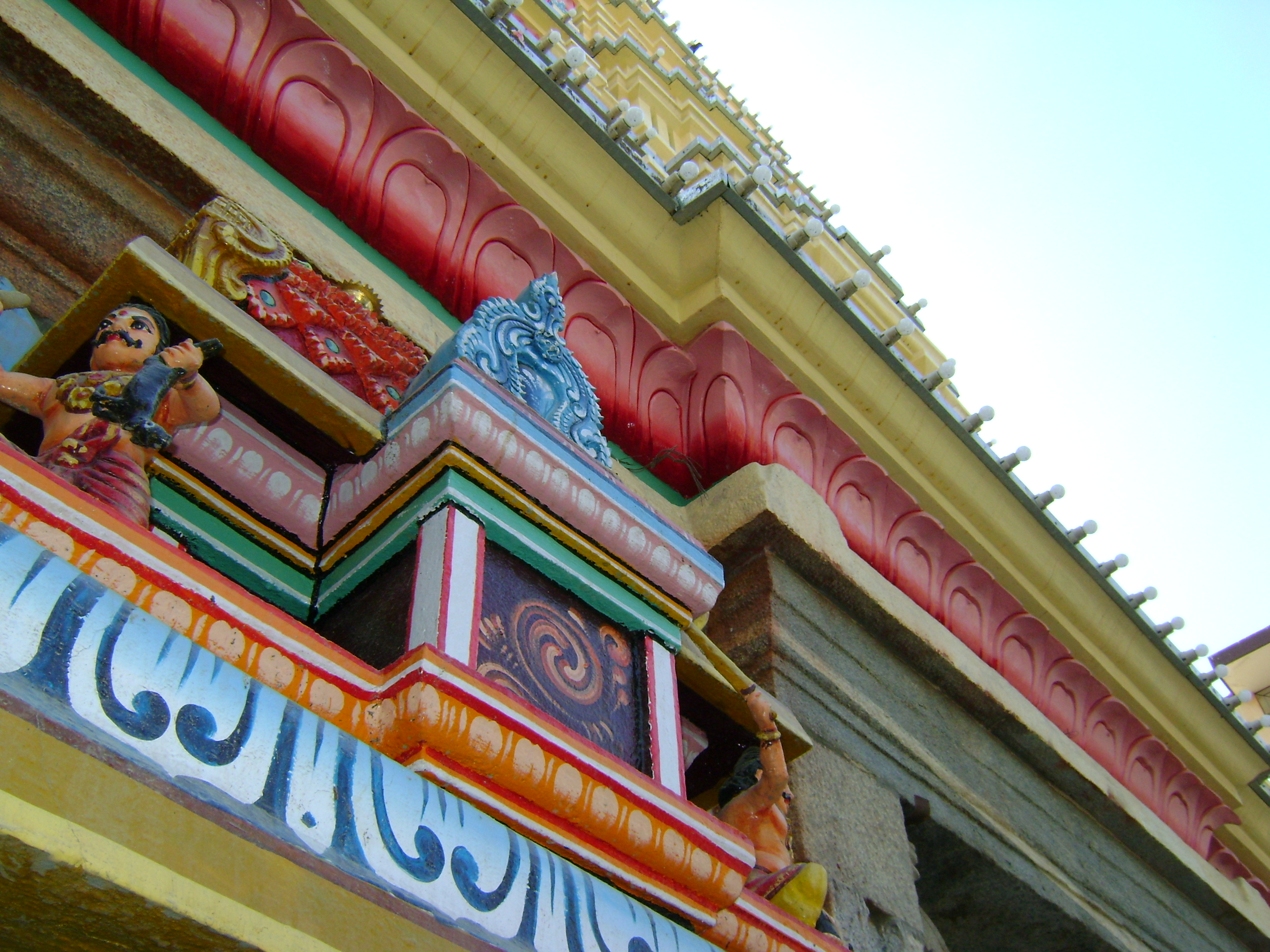
Architectural style of Dharmaraya Swami temple.

== See also ==
- Dodda Basavana Gudi (the Nandhi Temple) another temple on Bull Temple Road, Basavanagudi area of South Bengaluru
- Gavi Gangadhareshwara Temple also Gavipuram Cave Temple, an example of Indian rock-cut architecture in Bengaluru
- List of Chola temples in Bengaluru
