= Muthurayana Hosahalli Kaval =

Muthurayana Hosahalli Kaval Hareenahalli
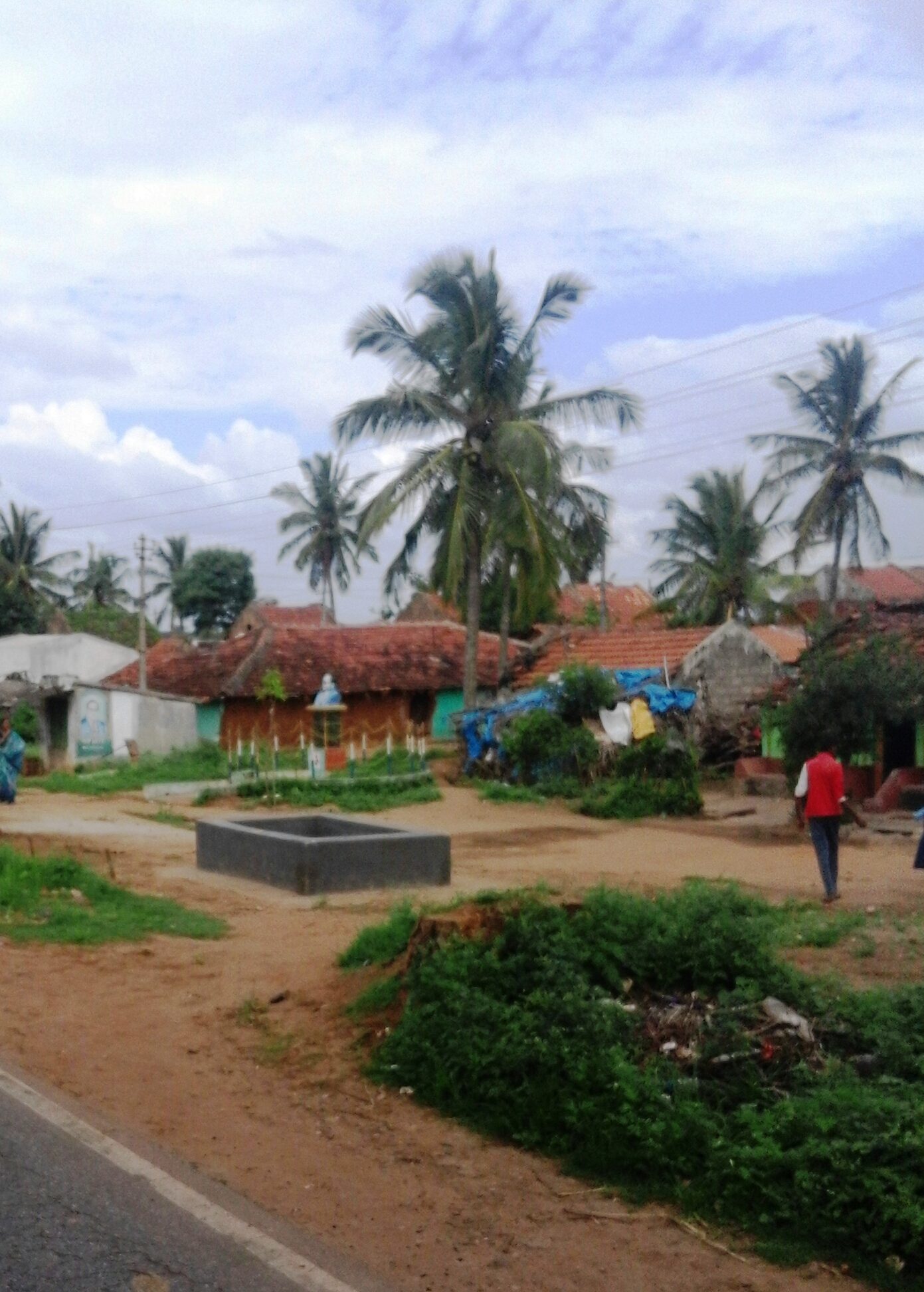
- Nickname: Muthurayana Hosahalli Kaval
- Interactive map of Muthurayana Hosahalli Kaval
- Coordinates: 12.30218°N 76.19679°E
- Country: India
- State: Karnataka
- District: Mysore
- Time zone: UTC+05:30 (IST)
- PIN: 571105

Muthurayana Hosahalli Kaval is a small village in Mysore district of Karnataka state, India.

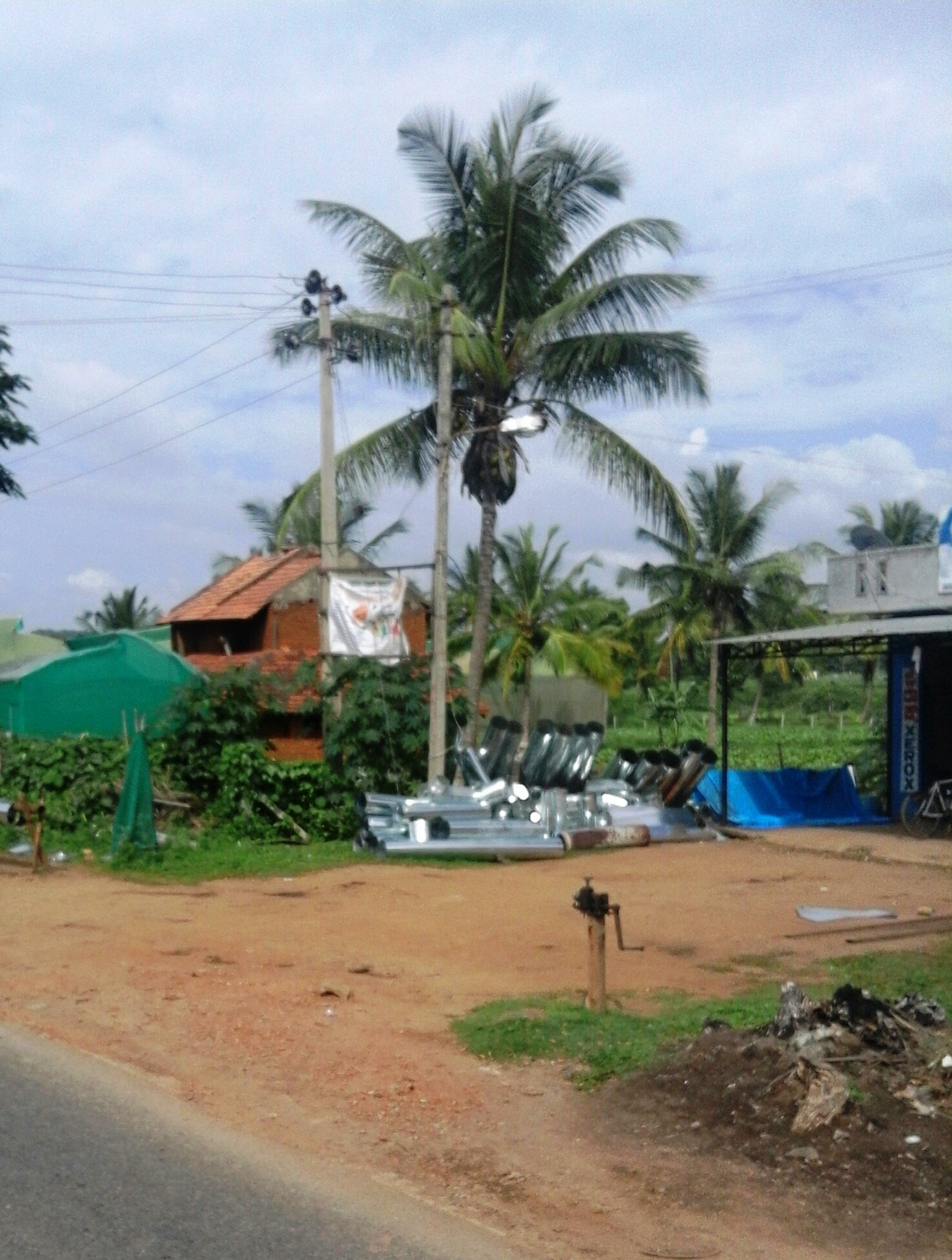
Muthrani Hosyana Kaval

== Location ==
Muthurayana Hosahalli Kaval is located on the Mysore—Virajpet road, 10 km from Hunsur.

== Demographics ==
According to 2011 census, this village has a total population of 1,558 people. There are 349 houses in the village.

== Villages and Suburbs ==
- Hulaganahalli
- Vadlimanuganahalli
- Kallahallikaval
- Angatahalli
- Ramenahalli
- Chennasoge
- Hosakote

== Festivals ==
Yugadi, Dussehra, Makar Sankranti, Karaga, Hampi Utsava (festival), Hoysala Mahotsava (celebration), Vairamudi, Tula Sankramana, Diwali, Eid-ul-Adha, Muharram, Eid-ul-Fitr are the major festivals celebrated in Muthurayana Hosahalli.

== Economy ==
Rice, ragi, jowar, maize, pulses, oilseeds, cashews, coconut, arecanut, cardamom, chillies, cotton, sugarcane and tobacco are the major crops that are cultivated mostly in the area.
