= Ramagondanahalli =

Ramagondanahalli Ramagondanahalli
- neighbourhood
- Coordinates: 12°57′N 77°44′E
- Country: India
- State: Karnataka
- District: Bangalore Urban
- Metro: Bangalore

Government
  - MLA: Arvind Limbavali
  - Member of Parliament: PC Mohan
  - Corporator: S Uday Kumar (ward number-84)

Languages
  - Official: Kannada
- Time zone: UTC+5:30 (IST)
- PIN: 560066
- Telephone code: 91-80
- Vehicle registration: KA 53
- Lok Sabha: Bangalore central
- Vidhan Sabha: Mahadevpura constituency

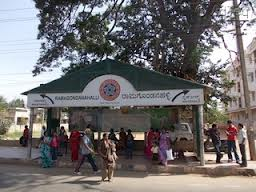
Bus stop

Ramagondanahalli is a suburb near the Whitefield area of Bengaluru. There are many celebrations held in this town e.g. Karaga that is held in March on a full moon day. This town has many shops such as Dominos, Goli vada pav, Honda showroom, Bajaj showroom, Honda showroom etc. Sigma tech park is situated in this area. There are many apartments coming such as DNR atmosphere, SVS silver woods etc. It comes under the constituency of Mahadevpura. It is mostly populated with vannikula kshatriyas (thigalas). There are many temples in this town. There is a big hospital i.e. Manipal. Palm meadows, a luxury gated community is also an attraction to many foreigners, who prefer to be a resident here looking for some peace and quiet. There is a huge lake. Famous story writer Suresh Padmanaban native of Kallakurichi resides here.
