= Karagas language =

Karagas language may refer to:

- Karagas, another name for the Turkic Tofa language
- Karagas, a dialect of the extinct Uralic Mator language

== See also ==
- Karaga (disambiguation)
