= Dargah of Shah Raju =

Sufi shrine in Hyderabad, India

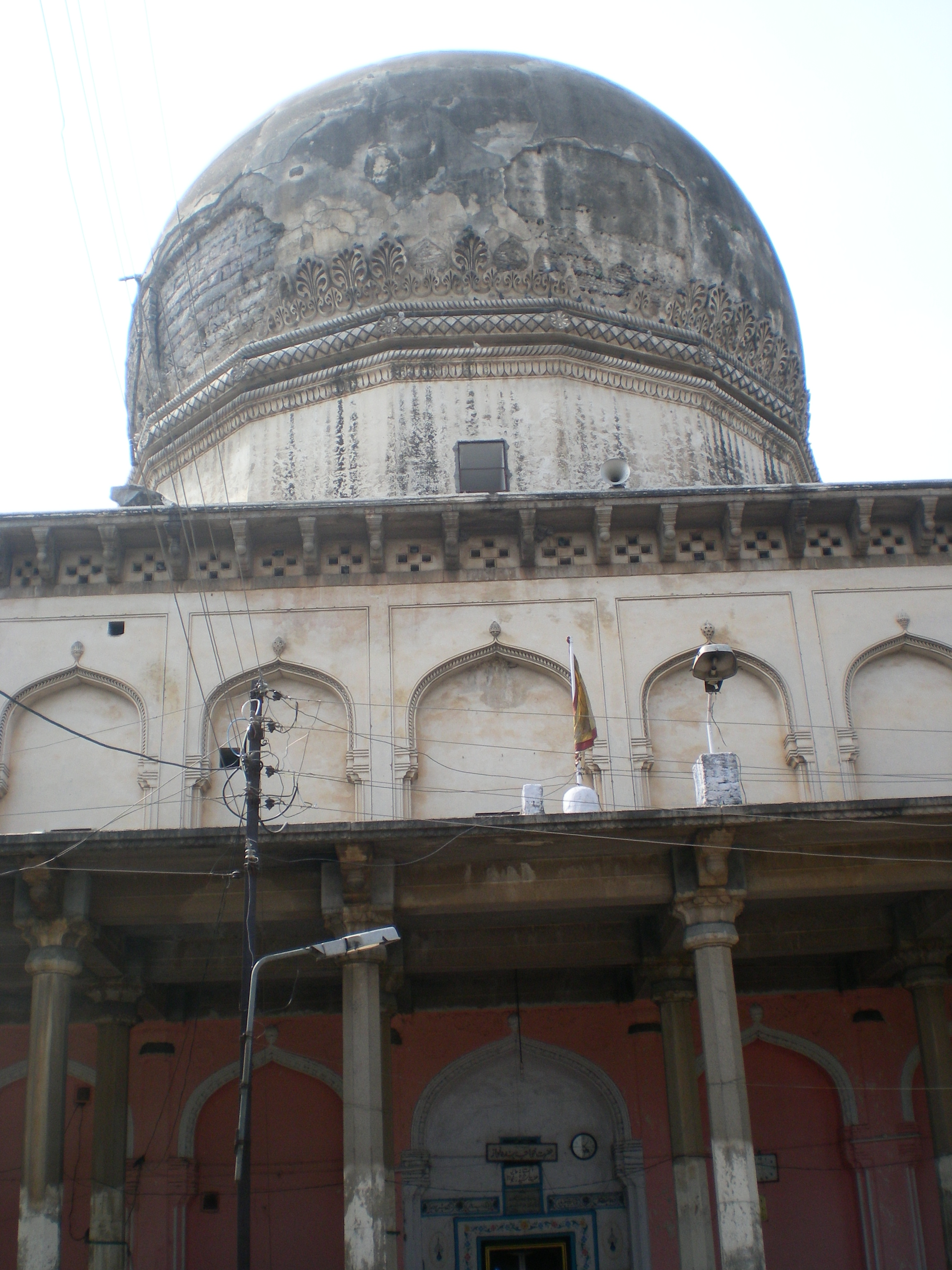

Dargah of Shah Raju is the dargah of the Sufi saint Shah Raju in Misrigunj, Hyderabad, India.

== History ==
Syed Shah Raju Qattal Hussaini was the spiritual guide of Abul Hasan Qutb Shah. The western wing was still under construction when the Golconda Sultanate was conquered by the Mughals.

== Description ==
It is a three storied building. The dome rises to 165 feet. On all four sides of the building, Nastaliq inscriptions are seen on wooden panels.
