= Thigala =

Social group

Regions with significant populations

Languages
- Kannada, Tamil

Religion
- Hinduism

Related ethnic groups
- Vanniyar · Agnivansha

Thigala (IPA: [t̪iɡɐɭɐ]) (or Tigalas) is a social group found in Karnataka and Tamil Nadu, India, particularly the city of Bengaluru and in Southern Karnataka. Historically, the Thigala people were known for their expertise in horticulture and the cultivation of the flowers. Hyder Ali brought the Thigala people for the development of Lalbagh gardening then they played a major role in making Bangalore as Flower City.

Their main deities are Draupadi and Dharmaraya Swamy. There is a Dharmaraya temple in Thigalarapete which was built in the 11th century AD. Kempegowda, the founder of Bangalore, built four gopuras with this temple as the centre of the city. The Karaga festival is celebrated in Narasapura, Kolar, Bangalore, Hosakote, Anekal, Malur, Jakkasandra, Immadahalli, Mayasandra, Huskur, Ramagondanahalli, Bethamangala, Varthur, Doopanahalli, Chunchagatta, Vokkaleri, Vijayapura, Lakkur, Thornahalli, Bellandur and in other towns where Thigalas are highly located.
