= Hazrat Tawakkal Mastan Dargah =

Religious place in Bangalore, India

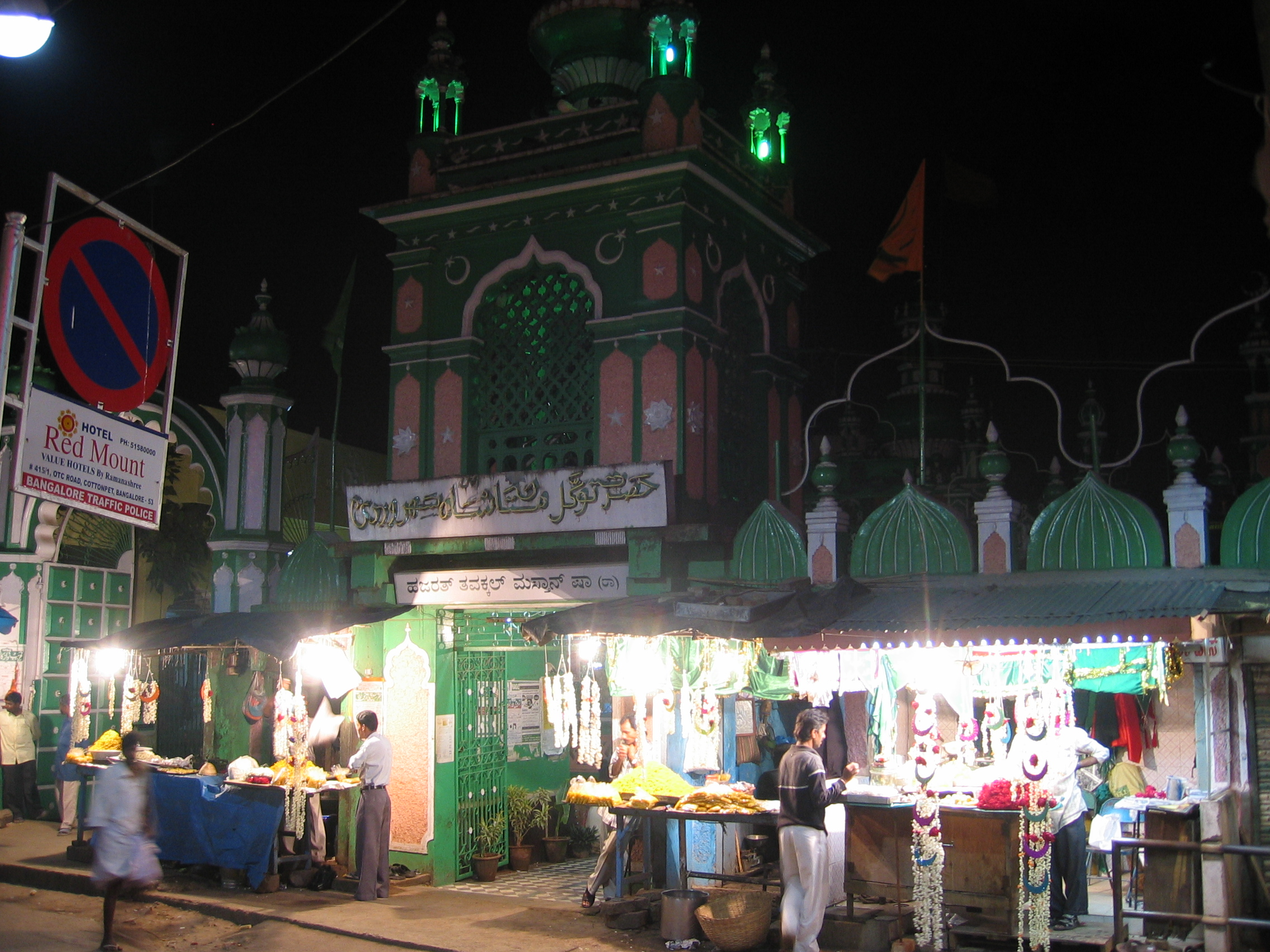

Religion
- Affiliation: Islam

Location
- Location: Cotton Pete, Bengaluru
- State: Karnataka
- Interactive map of Hazrat Tawakkal Mastan Dargah
- Coordinates: 12.973°N 77.572°E

Architecture
- Founder: Hyder Ali
- Funded by: Hyder Ali
- Completed: 1783 A.D

Hazrat Tawakkal Mastan Dargah is a Sufi shrine of Islam with a history of about 200 years located at Cottonpete of Bengaluru city. The dargah is considered to be the oldest and largest dargah in Bengaluru city.

== History ==
In the mid-18th century A.D Bengaluru was ruled by Hyder Ali. During Hyder Ali's reign, in 1761 A.D he decided to re-build the fort by stone which was initially built by Kempegowda using mud in 1537 A.D. Hyder Ali learned that three of them who were involved in the construction of the fort had refused their salaries. He requested his uncle Hazrath Ibrahim saheb, initially was a khilledar(later was a governor of bangalore) to collect information about them . Hazrath Ibrahim saheb sufi pir (Zindawali) found them in his Khankha and masjid e Ibrahim shah at kumbarpet near the fort. He informs Hyder Ali that their names are Hazrat Tawakkal Baba, Hazrat Tipu Mastan, and Manik Mastan who are the Sufi saints. When Hyder Ali requests them to receive a salary, the trio asks him to build a mosque near the Uppara Pete. Upon their request Hyder Ali agrees to build a mosque. The construction of the mosque which was begun by Hyder Ali in 1777 AD, was completed by his son Tipu Sultan in 1783 AD. Tavakkal Baba, died in the mosque in 1777 AD and this information comes from the inscription at the top of the tomb which is located inside the building.

== Specialization ==
The special feature and symbol of integration is when every year the famous Bengaluru Kharaga festival is held. Participants in the Karaga who bear the deity on their head without touching by hand and moving around come to this Dargah before the event, receive dhuparati and then they leave for the circumnavigation of the city. The three-day prior to annual Karaga festival, there is a regular practice in which the Participants in the Karaga who bear the deity and Mujhavir who is the Dargah priest exchange the lemon with each other.

== Divine Vows ==
Hazrat Tawakkal Mastan Dargah is visited not only by Muslims but also by other religions. To get rid of their hardship, It is the regular practice of the devotees to lock the window grills of the Dargah. The traditional ritual here is to worship God by singing the Kavwali song every Fridays.
