= Bangalore Karaga =

Annual festival celebrated in Bangalore

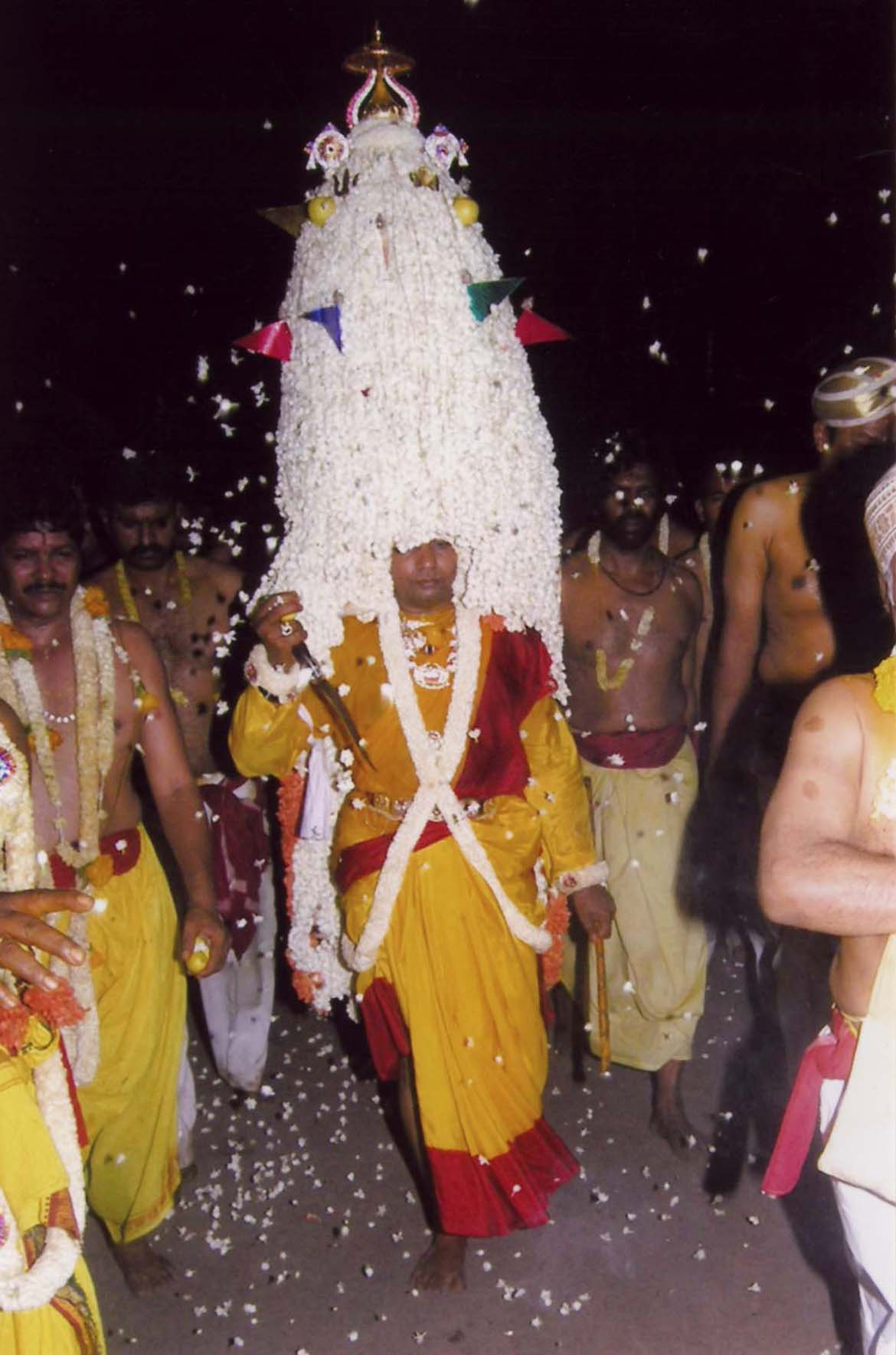
Karaga festival

Bengaluru Karaga is an annual festival celebrated in Thigalarpete, central Bengaluru (Bangalore). The festival centered around goddess Draupadi, who is considered to take a form of incarnation of Adishakthi by the worshippers. The festival activities take place around the temples of Dharmaraya (Yudhishtira) and Draupati in Nagarathpete (historically Thigalarpete).

== History ==
Karaga is linked to Thigalas, a subgroup of Vahnikula Kshatriya, a community in south India who claim their mythological origin with fire with mythological connections to Draupadi of Mahabharata. Historically the community was referred as Palli or Vanniyar in Tamil Nadu and Thigala in Karnataka. with sansritization efforts in late 19th century, the community started claiming association with Kshatriya varna connecting to dynasties like Pallava and Chalukya.

Historically, the community migrated from Tamil Nadu to Bangalore with significant waves of migration occurred during the 18th century under the reign of Hyder Ali and Tipu Sultan. The rulers invited them, who were skilled in agriculture and horticulture to maintain the Lalbagh Gardens.

The festival history spans back to 800 to 300 years according to different sources. It is usually held in the months of March or April, the hindu month of Chiatra. The festival celebrates Draupadi as the ideal woman and the Goddess of Strength (Shakti) which is atrribuated to slaying of Timirasura.

== Mythology ==
Towards the last days of their lives, the Pandavas and Draupadi left their kingdom and journeyed to the Himalayas. Draupadi was far behind her husbands when Timirasura who saw Draupadi approached her menacingly to tease and impress her. Draupadi (an incarnation of Shakti) with her powers, is believed to have created an army of soldiers, called Veerakumaras to defend and destroy Timirasura (some retellings also say that she transformed into a man to fight and kill Timirasura). When Draupadi continued her ascent to heaven, the Veerakumaras asked her not to leave. She promised them that she would come back to earth on Chaitra Poornami. The ten-day Karaga marks the homecoming of Draupadi.

== Rituals ==
The word 'Karaga' means mud pot. A decorated mud pot, usually with jasmine flowers is traditionally carried by a male dressed as female. The ritualistic processing and the dance involves the pot carrying on head, balancing it without touching it. The bearer is accompanied by hundreds of Veerakumaras, male volunteers of the community who took ritual initiation.

The 10 day festival activities starts around the Dharmaraya Swamy Temple. The last day night procession coincides with the full moon.

=== Hasi Karaga ===
Hasi Karaga (Pacchi Karagu) is a preliminary ritual observed during the Karaga festival on the day of Chaitra Shuddha Trayodashi. It forms an important preparatory phase leading up to the main Karaga procession and is associated with the invocation of Shakti.

=== Huvina Karaga ===
On the evening of the full moon, the Karaga priest undergoes traditional transformation to woman's attire. A ceremonial observance related to Arjuna and Draupadi follows. Later at night, the Karaga priest, along with other ritual participants, assembles at Sampangi Lake, where he is dressed in a bridal form with floral and traditional ornaments. After ritual worship, the presence of Adishakti is believed to manifest within him. The procession returns to the temple, where the priest briefly enters the sanctum. A chariot carrying the utsava murtis of Arjuna and Draupadi is then moved. The priest subsequently emerges bearing the Karaga, the decorated pot on his head. Following Maha Mangalarati, a public procession proceeds through designated routes, accompanied by music and martial displays.

The Karaga is received with offerings at temples along its route and is also taken to the Hazrat Tawakkal Mastan Dargah, in Upparapete. The procession returns to the temple before sunrise, after which worship is open to all devotees. Festivities also include pallakki processions of deities from various temples.

== Festival effect from COVID-19 ==
During 2020, Bengaluru Karaga was initially cancelled from a decision taken by the Deputy Commissioner, fearing the transmission of COVID-19 from a large-scale gathering of people and local community during the lock down period. "In view of the Centre’s directions and Disaster Management Act, 2005, the festivities should not be held," the order reads. The state government granted permission for this popular festival by relaxing the lock down norms which was held on 8 April 2020.

== Gallery ==
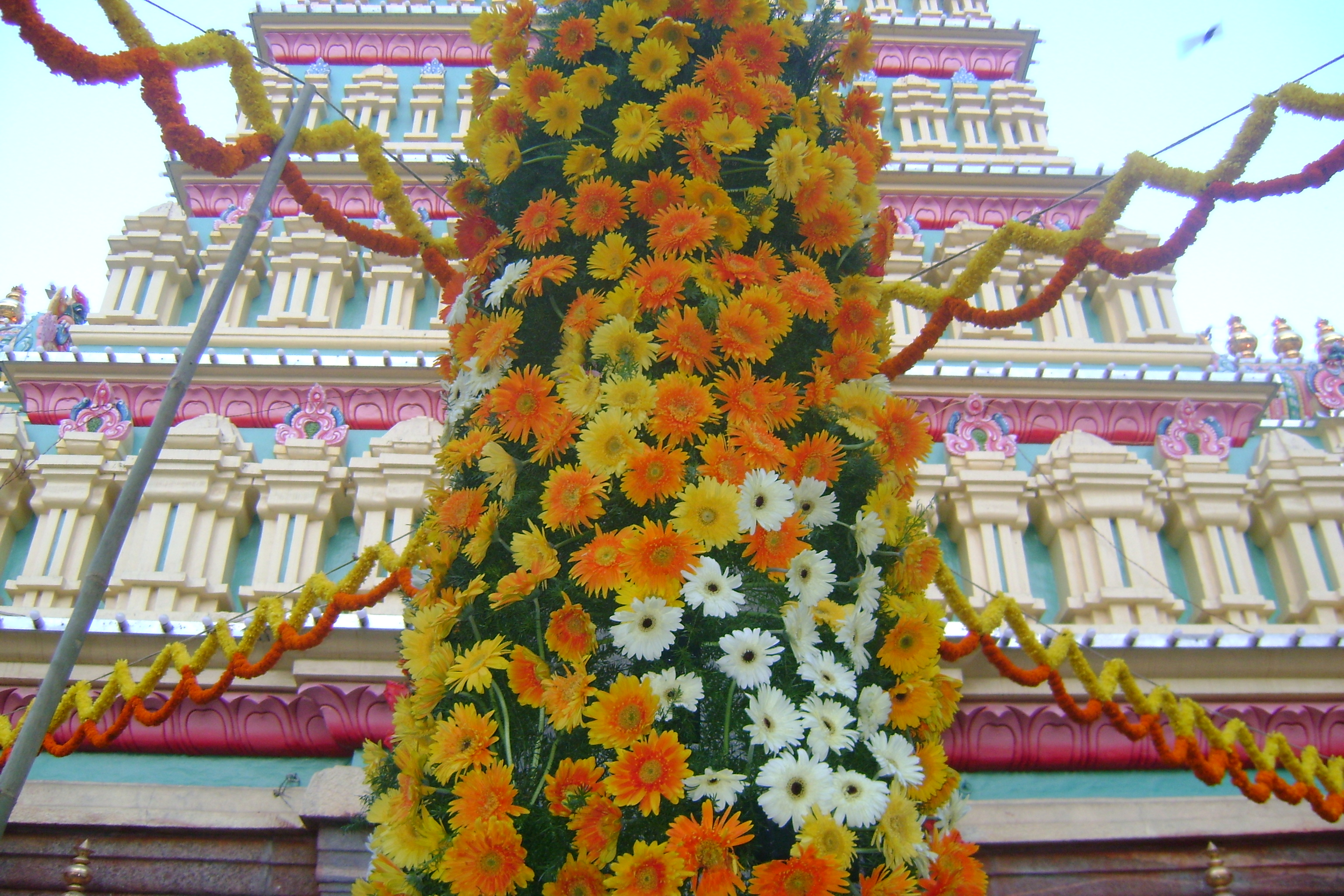
Work by horticulturist Thigalas.

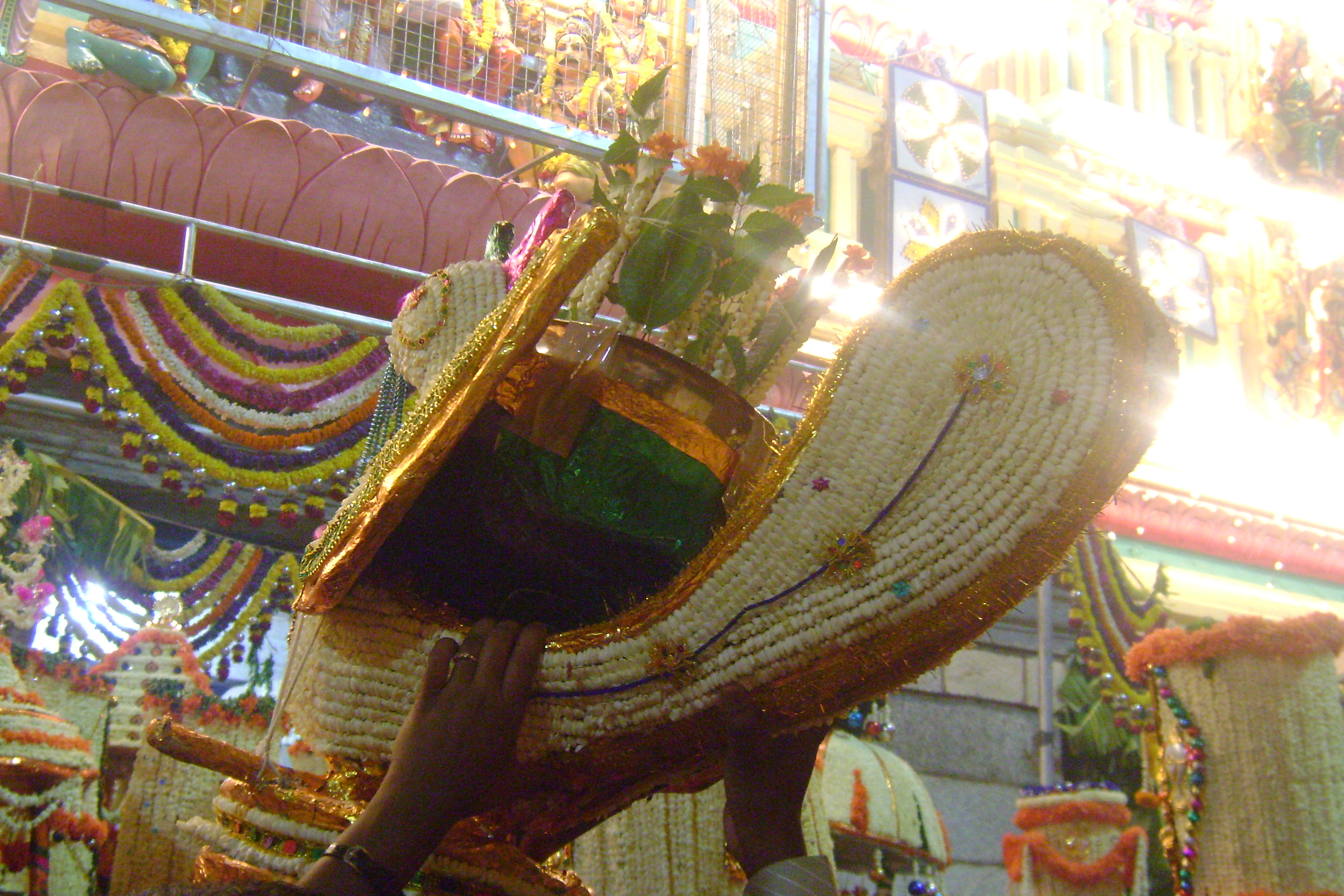
One of the deepa, which resemble birds.

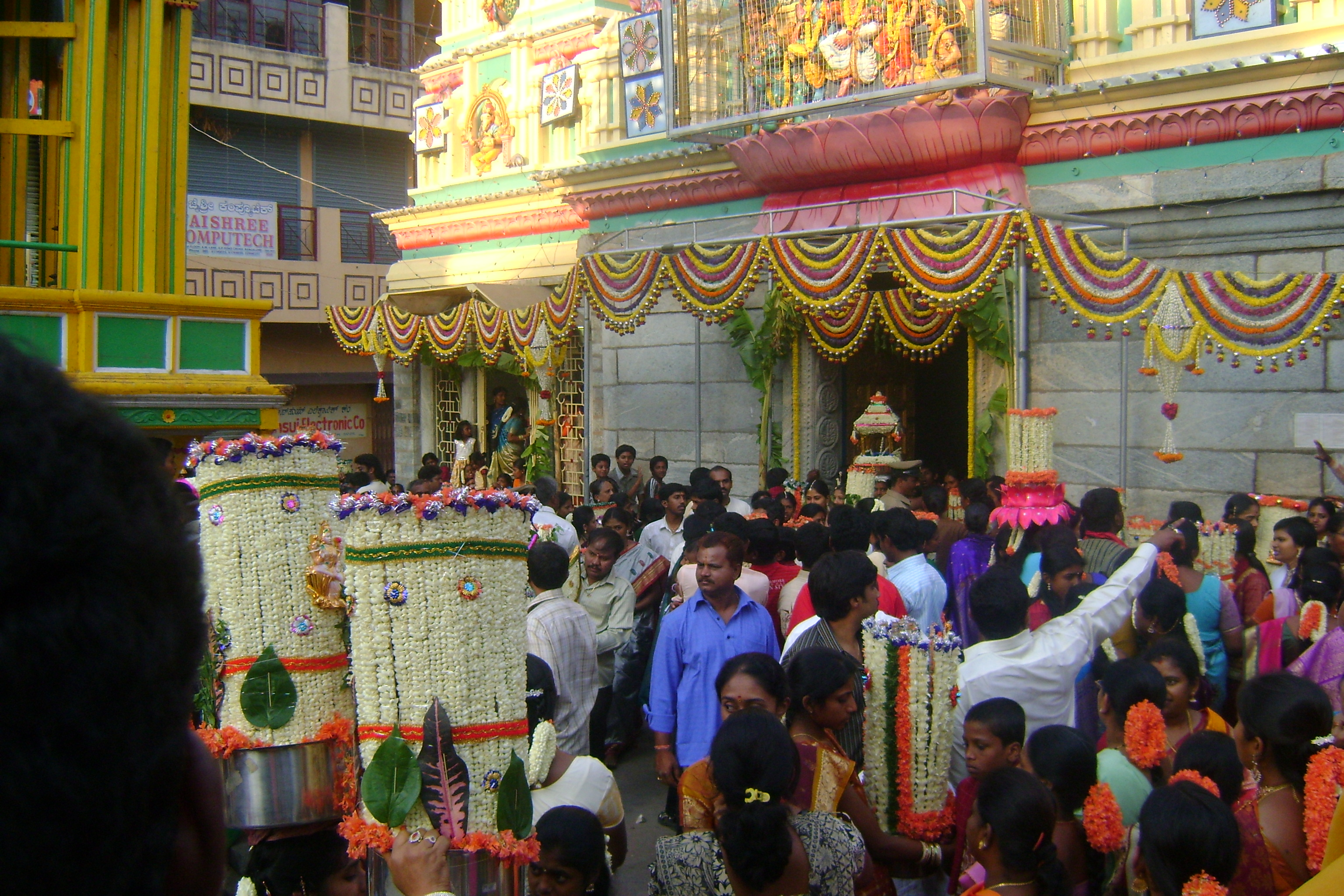
Devotees leaving the temple premises after finishing aarthi depotsava.

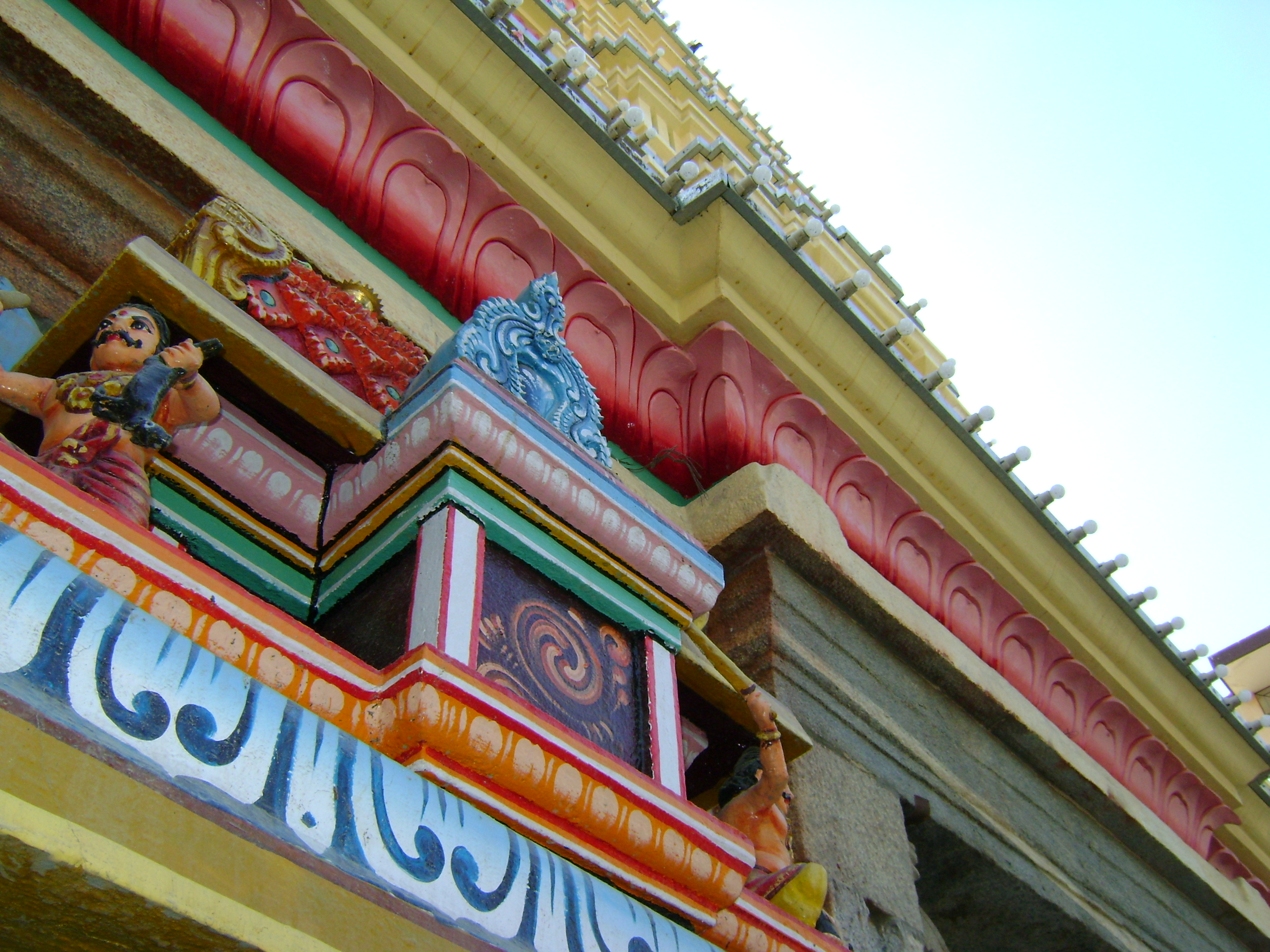
The Dharmaraya Swamy Temple is unique, as it's dedicated to the Pandavas and Krishna.

== See also ==
- Sri Dharmarayaswamy Temple, Bengaluru
