= Qareh Qayeh, Meyaneh =

Qareh Qayeh قره قيه
- Village
- Location within Iran
- Coordinates: 37°46′27″N 48°04′54″E
- Country: Iran
- Province: East Azerbaijan
- County: Meyaneh
- Bakhsh: Kandovan
- Rural District: Garmeh-ye Shomali

Population (2006)
  - Total: 100
- Time zone: UTC+3:30 (IRST)
  - Summer (DST): UTC+4:30 (IRDT)

Qareh Qayeh (Persian: قره قيه; also known as Karaga, Qaraga, Qarah Qayā, Qarehgeh, and Qareh Qayā) is a village in Garmeh-ye Shomali Rural District, Kandovan District, Meyaneh County, East Azerbaijan Province, Iran. At the 2006 census, its population was 100, in 24 families.
