= Karaga people =

The Karaga are a geographical subgroup of the Koryaks in Russia. They live on the Kamchatka Peninsula primarily in the Koryak Autonomous Oblast.

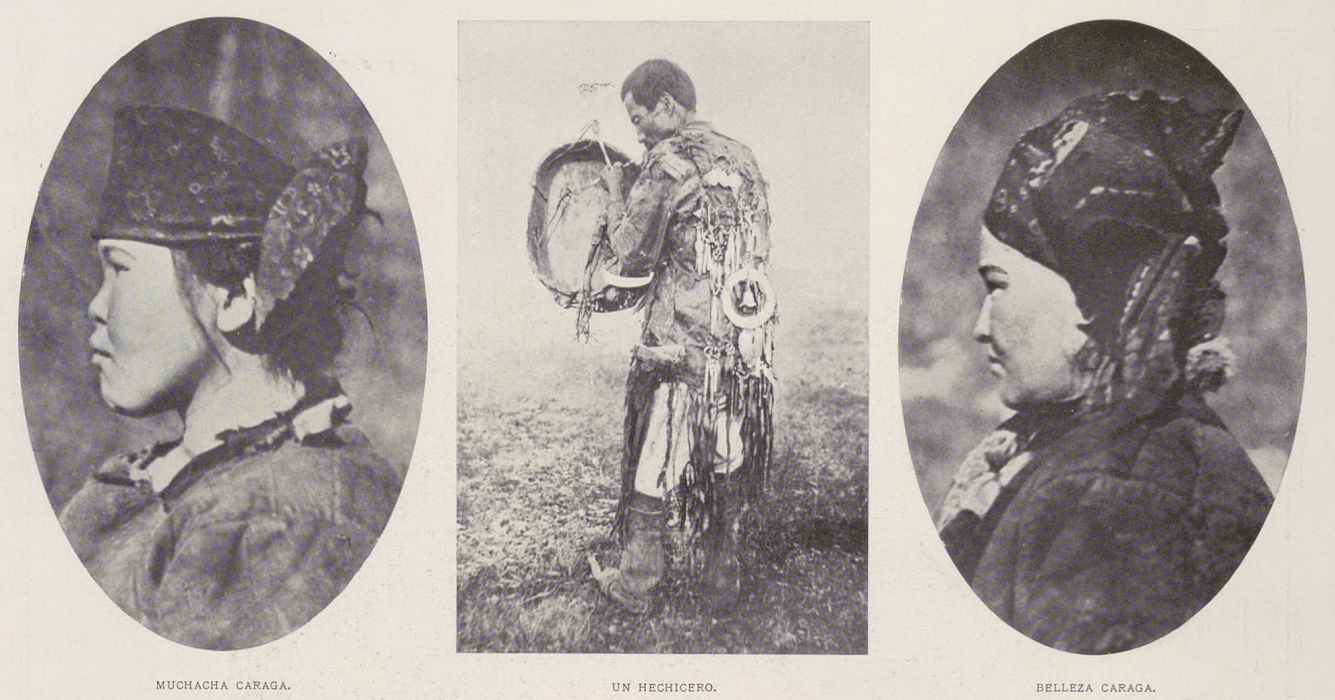
Karaga people in the Argentine magazine Plus Ultra in August of 1923.

== Sources ==
- Wixman, Ronald. The Peoples of the USSR: An Ethnographic Handbook (Armonk: M. E. Sharpe, 1984) p. 93
