= Ujjaini Mahakali Temple =

- Location in Hyderabad

Religion
- Affiliation: Hinduism
- Deity: Mahakali

Location
- Location: General Bazaar, Secunderabad
- State: Telangana
- Country: India
- Interactive map of Ujjaini Mahakali Temple
- Coordinates: 17°26′12″N 78°29′28″E

Architecture
- Completed: 1815; 211 years ago

Website
- https://sriujjainimahakalimatha.org/

Sri Ujjaini Mahakali Temple is a temple in the Secunderabad area in Telangana. It was built in 1815. Lakhs of devotees offer prayers during Ashada Jathara. It is also popular during the festival of Bonalu.

== History ==
It is believed that in the year 1813, Cholera broke out in the city and killed thousands. At the same time military battalions were transferred to Ujjain in Madhya Pradesh from Secunderabad. Doli bearer Suriti Appaiah along with his associates went to Mahakali Devastanam at Ujjain and prayed for the benefit of people. He promised that if the people were saved from the epidemic, he would install an idol of the goddess. As soon as they returned from Ujjain, Appaiah and his associates installed the wooden idol in Secunderabad in July 1814.
