= Madanna and Akkanna =

Brahmin brothers, high-ranked officials of the Golkonda sultanate (17th century CE)

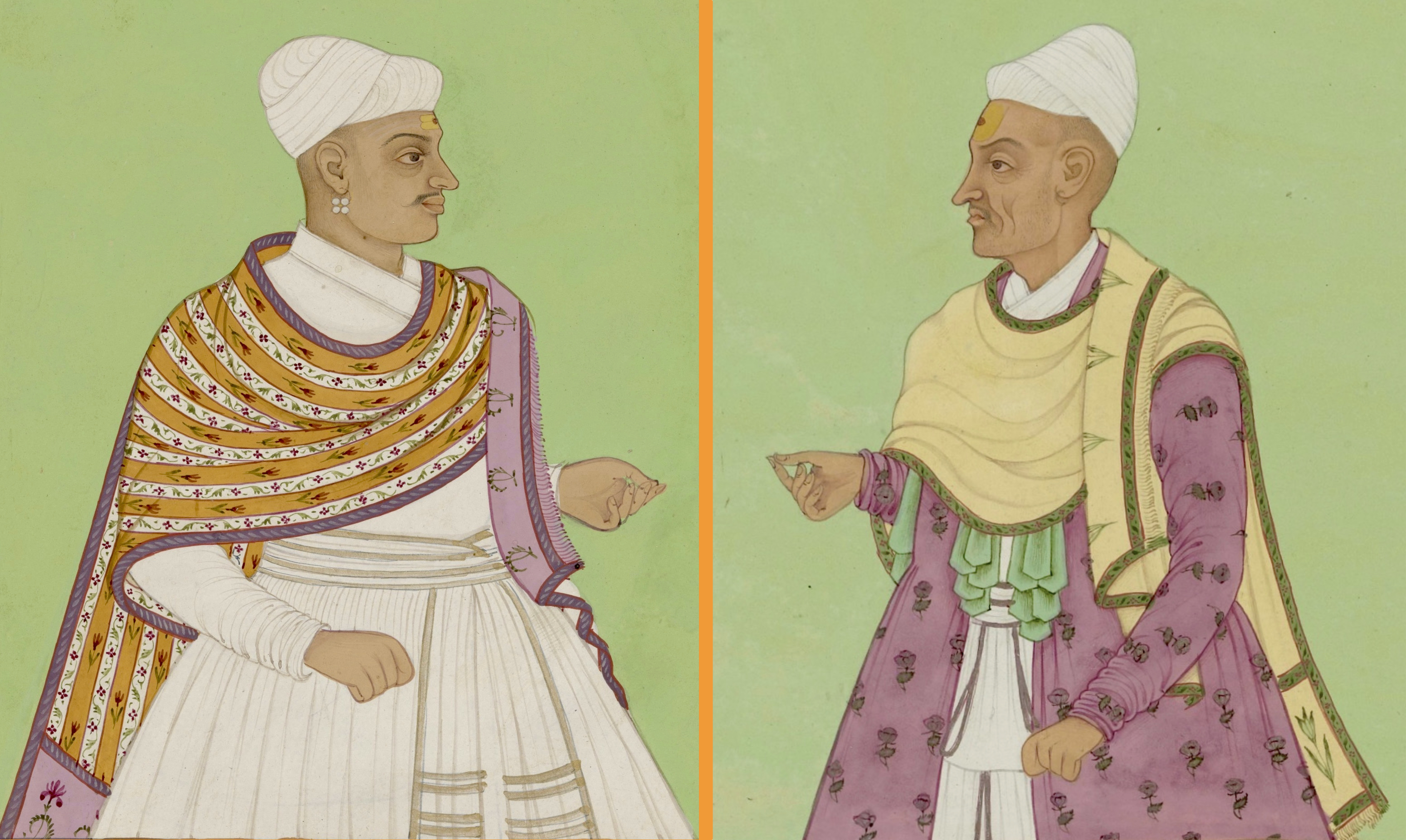
Akkanna and Madanna brothers, ministers in Golconda Sultanate

Madanna and Akkanna were two Brahmin brothers who rose to prominence in the Golkonda sultanate in the final two decades of the 17th century. They helped Abul Hasan Qutb Shah come to power, who appointed them as ministers in his court. According to historian Gajanan Bhaskar Mehendale the Qutbshah left the entire sultanate into their management. He also made them responsible for collecting jizya taxes from the Hindus – predominant part of the Sultanate's population. By the 1680s, according to the colonial era Dutch India archives, they controlled all the tax collection and the exchequer of the Golkonda Sultanate. According to Gijs Kruijtzer – a historian specializing in Deccan Sultanates, the Madanna and Akkanna brothers can be viewed as early "nationalists" seeking the welfare of their people and the general public. They can also be viewed as "communalists" who criticized the Muslim elites as exploitative who do not care about non-Muslims, who serve the interest of their holy land in Arabia, and seek personal gain. The two brothers spent the taxes they collected in Golconda on the "welfare of the public", states Kruijtzer, which included furthering trade with the colonial Dutch, building public sarai (resting place for travelers), as well as restoring and building temples.

Their remarkable rise to power and public priorities in the Golconda Sultanate, whose elite predominantly were Muslims, became a folklore among the Hindus. Muslims reached out to Aurangzeb, who in 1683 sent his army to attack Golconda Sultanate. The brothers attempted for peace with a deal to pay a large annual tribute to the Mughal empire. In 1685, Aurangzeb sent a regiment led by his son to end Golconda Sultanate, absorb it into the Mughal empire. This time the Mughal army captured and beheaded Madanna and Akkanna. The two brothers remain popular among the Hindus in the modern era Telangana, with many monuments named after them.

== Early life ==
Madanna and Akkanna were born to “Pengala Banooge Timayamah” or “Banoojee puntooloo” and his wife in the town of Hanamkonda in the district of Warangal, Telangana, India. Madanna and Akkanna are popular forms of Madhava Bhanuji and Akkarasu Bhanuji respectively. They may have belonged to one of the branches of the Maharashtrian Brahmins, which is not to say that their family may not also have been based in the Telangana plateau for generations so that Madanna and Akkanna would have spoken fluent Telugu besides Marathi. According to Aiyangar, Madanna's formal name was Suryaprakasha Rao and he was fluent in Telugu, Sanskrit, Persian, Hindustani (Hindi, Urdu), and several other languages.

== Career ==
...you yourself can imagine which
government serves the king best,
ours or that of the Moors [Muslims];
ours being fullheartedly devoted
to the welfare of the country,
while we are not people who have
or seek other countries,
but that of the Moors is
only to the end of becoming rich
and then to leave for those places
which they consider to be
either their fatherland or holy.

—Akkanna, 1683, (Transl: Gijs Kruijtzer)

There are several version of Madanna and Akkanna history found in popular media and texts of India. The variation is from which of the four sources one relies on and which one ignores: the Dutch East India Company records (also called the VOC records), the Mackenzie manuscripts, the Muslim court historians, or the evolving Hindu folklore. Of these, the VOC records were contemporaneous to the events and Dutch merchants directly interacted with Madanna, Akkanna and the Muslim elites of the Golconda Sultanate. The Mackenzie manuscripts date to over 100 years after the death of the brothers. The records of the Muslim historians as well as the Hindu folklores – or Brahmin perspectives – are largely hearsay and they vary in their dates as well as details, largely reflecting the bias of their authors.

The Indologist A.H. Longhurst, relying on contemporaneous records from the 17th-century such as those of Dutch journalist Havart, states that Madanna and Akkanna became ministers in the reign of Abdullah Qutb Shah, the Sultan of Golconda who ruled for nearly 45 years. Their department collected Jizya religious tax from the Hindus. Qutb Shah did not have a son, only three daughters. After he died, the succession choice was between the three sons-in-law. The Madanna and Akkanna brothers helped Abul Hasan Qutb Shah (Tana Shah) become the next Sultan, thereby gaining their confidence and trust. They prospered and were soon responsible for the Sultanate's entire tax collection and the spending of its exchequer. This power over the purse made them very powerful.

The Muslim sources, in contrast, caricature Madanna in a different way. His career is said to have started in 1666 CE as a clerk of Sayyid Muzaffar, who was a military general and of Persian origin. When Tana Shah became the Sultan, he chose Sayyid Muzaffar as his wazir. Sayyid Muzaffar, however, abused his power and treated the new Sultan like an appendage. Upset, the Sultan quietly dismissed Muzaffar and replaced him with Madanna as his wazir and "gave him the title of Suryaprakasha Rao". Madanna then appointed Akkanna as his military general over the Muslim army of Golconda, and his nephew Rustom Rao as the chief of all horses. Madanna in this version, was not a minister, just a lowly employee but suddenly appointed the prime minister by Tana Shah. He is described as the one who coopted power through guile and intrigue, whom the Muslim elites and army despised for over 10 years. This version, states Aiyangar, is unlikely to be true because "Suryaprakasha Rao" is no title in either a Sultanate or a Hindu kingdom, it is just a name. It is also unlikely that Akkanna, openly a Hindu, could have run an army of Muslims for over 10 years, when they despised him. This version is also not corroborated in alternate versions.

The Hindu sources, such as the records at Advaita monasteries and those in the neighboring kingdoms, present another version. The western region of India was already under the control of the Maratha kingdom under Chhatrapati Shivaji, and he wanted to extend the Hindu kingdom into the north with a war with the Mughals, into the south by removing all Sultanates, and into the east by absorbing Golconda Sultanate. He chose to focus, rather than wage war everywhere. Tana Shah was well aware of the threat he faced from the Mughal army in the north and seeking large financial tributes, versus the Maratha army from the west seeking cooperation and assistance in their southern campaign. Madanna and Akkanna were already ministers in Tana Shah's court. As prime minister, Madanna assured a cooperative Hindu population in Golconda, increasing trade with new colonial powers, and an alliance with Shivaji in the west. Tana Shah pursued this approach, and these geopolitical circumstances propelled the career of Madanna and Akkanna. According to Maratha records, Tana Shah entered into agreement to provide Shivaji with artillery troops for a joint campaign in exchange for lands that previously were under the control of a larger Golconda Sultanate. The common element in the different versions is that Madanna and Akkanna were in seats of power in 1673, and highly influential in Golconda Sultanate till they were assassinated.

According to a British record dated July 1676, and corroborated by the Hindu sources, Akkanna was never a general of the Muslim army. Rather, in 1675, he was appointed a Tarafdar (governor) for the Karnataka part of the Golconda Sultanate, after Muzaffar Khan and Musa Khan were set aside. The British records criticize the Brahmin brothers to be "very exacting" and "irksome" in their demands to the colonial British agents. According to Kruijtzer, there is no evidence in any source that Madanna was officially a "Peshva" or held the same title that "Mir Jumla" did before their rise to power, something that is often assumed and repeated. Titles aside, states Kruijtzer, the primary role and power of Madanna came from being Sultan's majmu'adar shahi, or "king's collector, bookkeeper". The caption in the miniature paintings of Madanna and Akkanna created in the 17th-century Golconda court, along with those of Tana Shah, identifies the brothers as "chief bookkeepers", not wazir or a general. Akkanna was an entrepreneur too, as his trade ships served the rising colonial era demand for international trade.

== Administration, policies ==
Madanna and Akkanna began their career in tax collection. As they reached their powerful position, they made this system highly efficient by civil "revenue farming". Their system of administration was different than Jagirs in use in the Mughal Empire. In the Jagir system, Muslim officers and elites were required to serve the emperor's demand for troops along with regular tributes. Instead of paying them a salary, the Mughal administration gave them a right to collect taxes and land revenue from the rural and urban population of certain area (jagir). Madanna and Akkanna placed the Golconda Sultanate officials and Muslim elites at the court on salary instead, and gave civilians the responsibility and right to collect taxes for a period of time in exchange for a lump sum upfront payment for that right. This separated those with military power from those with economic power, ensured a large upfront payments before rather than after a period. They thus created a new set of capitalist elites, often Brahmins, that held the power of the pen and the purse.

At the local level, Madanna and Akkanna decoupled the policing duty from the tax and economic administrators. The police were paid directly by the Sultanate treasury, while the civil administration focussed on tax collection and public services. Once again, they thus split the responsibilities, such that Muslims continued to dominate in the police roles, while newly created civil services enabled the Brahmins and Baniyas to enter into positions of financial administration, bookkeeping and administrative power. These policies helped in delivering the priorities set by Madanna and Akkanna.

The brothers used the taxes collected to further trade, build sarai (road side resthouses) and Hindu temples. They also issued gifts to matha (monasteries).

According to a manuscript in the Mackenzie collection, Madanna and Akkanna were sponsors of classical Indian arts. For example, they financed a troupe of Yakshagana artists – a form of traditional South Indian theatre, who toured the Golconda Sultanate every year.

== Death ==
The details of their death vary by the source, but the common thread is that they were brutally killed in 1685 by the Mughal forces under the command of Aurangzeb's son.

In one version, the financial prosperity of the brothers brought them power, as well as made them a target of the Muslim elite in Golconda Sultanate. The latter reached out to Aurangzeb, particularly Muhammad Ibrahim who defected in 1683 to the Mughal Empire after serving many years as a general in Golconda Sultanate army. Aurangzeb sent his army to attack Golconda Sultanate. After a seize and the payment of large tributes to the Mughal treasury by Madanna, soldiers led by Shah 'Alam – the son of Aurangzeb, returned to Golconda. They sought out and assassinated Akkanna and Madanna. This assassination was done, by some accounts with the knowledge of Abul Hasan Tana Shah. They were beheaded, and their heads were sent as trophies back to Aurangzeb. By other accounts, Tana Shah was unaware and the heads of Akkanna and Madanna were sent to Aurangzeb's son. In a third version, Madanna and Akkanna were captured by the Mughal forces, dragged in the street in front of the public in November 1685, Akkanna then killed under the feet of an elephant, while Madanna was beheaded and the head sent back to Aurangzeb. According to the Dutch India company records, on the day the brothers were murdered, "many" Brahmins were hunted down in Hyderabad and other parts of the Golconda Sultanate and they were also killed, their homes plundered.

== Legacy ==
Less than two years after their death, Aurangzeb dismissed the Sultan, arrested him and placed in a prison in Daulatabad. The sultanate became a part of the Mughal empire.

The period led by Madanna and Akkanna was remembered as a decade of golden age by some, already by the 18th century. The brothers are remembered in today's Telangana as administrators and as martyrs.

Visible reminders of their activities as politicians and religious benefactors are the Akkanna Madanna Temple in Hyderabad, Akkanna Madanna caves in Vijayawada, and the ruins marked as their offices in Golkonda fort.

== See also ==
- Akkanna Madanna Caves
- Akkanna Madanna Temple
- Sita Ramachandraswamy Temple, Bhadrachalam
