= Abul Hasan Qutb Shah =

Sultan of Golconda from 1672 to 1687

Abul Hasan Tana Shah
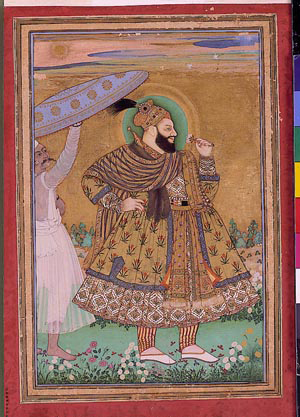

8th Sultan of Golconda
- Reign: 21 April 1672 – 22 September 1687
- Coronation: 21 April 1672
- Predecessor: Abdullah Qutb Shah
- Successor: Position abolished
- Born: Hyderabad (now in Telangana, India)
- Died: 1699; Daulatabad Fort (now in Maharashtra, India)
- Burial: Khuldabad, present-day Maharashtra
- Spouses: Badshah Bibi
- Issue: 5 children
- House: Qutb Shahi
- Dynasty: Qara Qoyunlu
- Religion: Shia Islam

Abul Hasan Qutb Shah, also known as Abul Hasan Tana Shah, was the eighth and last ruler of the Qutb Shahi dynasty, sovereign of the Kingdom of Golconda in South India. He ruled from 1672 to 1686. The last Sultan of this Shia Islamic dynasty, Tana Shah is remembered as an inclusive ruler. Instead of appointing only Muslims as ministers, he appointed Brahmin Hindus such as Madanna and Akkanna brothers as ministers in charge of tax collection and exchequer. Towards the end of his reign, one of his general's defected to the Mughal Empire, who then complained to Aurangzeb about the rising power of the Hindus as ministers in his Golconda Sultanate. Aurangzeb sent a regiment led by his son, who beheaded Tana Shah's Hindu ministers and plundered the Sultanate. In 1687, Aurangzeb ordered an arrest of Tana Shah, who was then imprisoned at the Daulatabad Fort. He died in prison in 1699.

== Biography ==
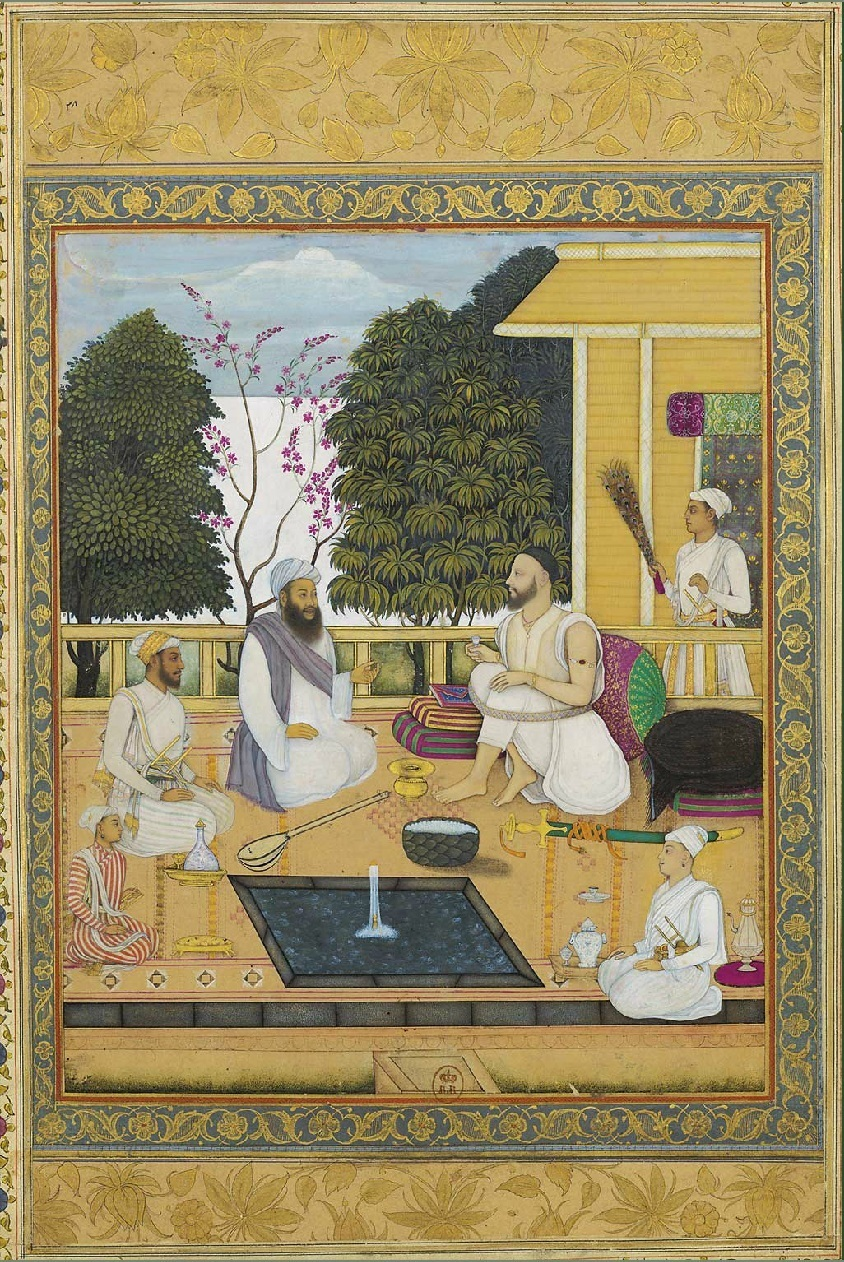
Visit of Sufi-singer Shir Muhammad to Abul Hasan Qutb Shah, ca. 1720, Bibliothèque Nationale de France, Paris.

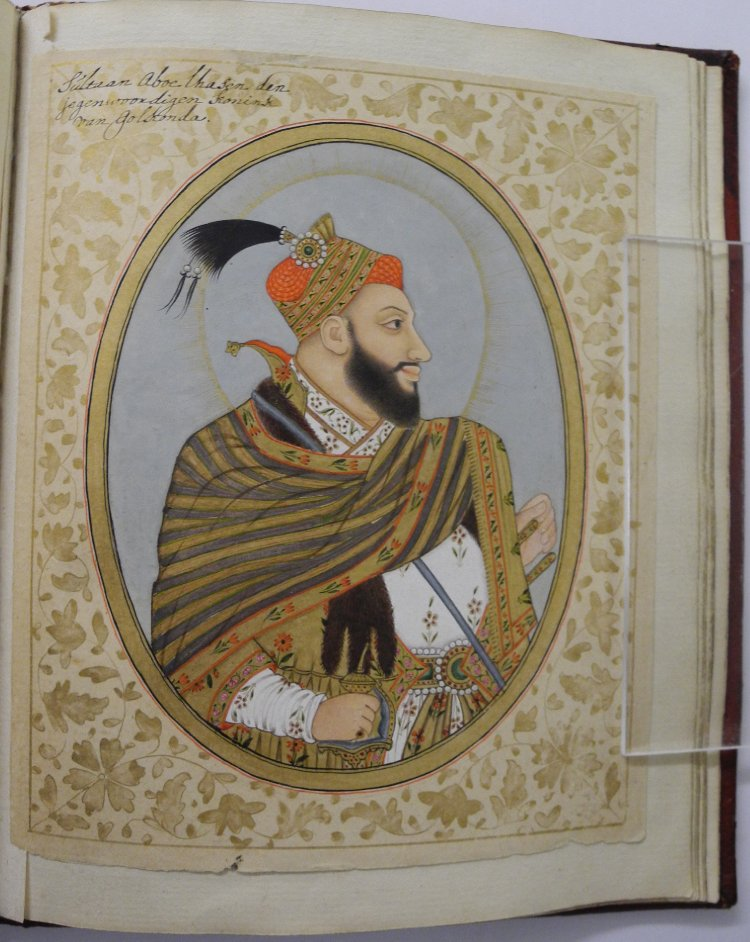
Portrait of Abul Hasan Qutb Shah

In his early life, he was unassociated with the royal court. He married one of the three daughters of Sultan Abdullah Qutub Shah, the second last Sultan of Golconda Sultanate. Abdullah Qutub Shah did not have a male heir. When he died, the succession choice was between the three sons-in-law. One was in prison, and the choice was between Sayyad Ahmad and Abul Hasan Qutb Shah. In a struggle for power between the two, the Muslim generals sided with Abul Hasan Qutb Shah.

Muslim historians describe him as a distant descendant from the male side of Qutb Shahi family, but one who was lazy, prone to drinking and who for a period followed a Sufi preacher Sayyad Kathal. He has been traced as the grandson of one of Sultan Muhammad Quli's nephews.

He came to be known as "Tānā Shah", lit. "King of Taste", because of his "love of the Arts and pleasure".

== Administration ==
The early Qutb Shahi sultans prohibited Hindus from observing their religious festivals, states Annemarie Schimmel – a scholar of Islamic studies. During the reign of Muhammad Quli Qutb Shah (1580–1611), who was a more tolerant ruler, the Hindus were allowed to openly observe their religious festivals like Diwali and Holi. This policy was extended by Abul Hasan Qutb Shah, who appointed Brahmin Hindus such as Madanna and Akkanna brothers as ministers in charge of tax collection and exchequer. The two brothers introduced many reforms and became very powerful. However, this led to significant factionalism between the Muslim elites and the rising power of the Brahmin Hindus. The Muslim faction reached out to Aurangzeb, who sent a regiment led by his son to attack Golconda. They beheaded Madanna and Akkanna, along with plundering the property and killing many more Hindus in administrative positions of the Qutb Shahi dynasty. Shortly thereafter, Abul Hasan Qutb Shah was jailed by Aurangzeb. With his death in prison, the Qutb Shahi dynasty came to an end.

== Imprisonment, death and burial ==
Under the orders of the Mughal emperor Aurangzeb, Tana Shan was arrested and imprisoned in the Daulatabad Fort (near Aurangabad). He died there after twelve years of captivity. When the sultan died, he was buried in a modest grave at Khuldabad, within the shrine of Shah Raju Qattal, a Sufi saint whose descendant Razi al-din Raju Qattal was held in great reverence by the sultan. With the death of Abul Hasan Qutub Shah, the Qutb Shahi dynasty ended and the region became part of the six Mughal provinces in the Deccan. Mahabat Khan, who was initially the commander of the Qutb Shahi army and had switched loyalty to the Mughals, was appointed the governor of Golconda, laying the foundations for the Hyderabad State under the Nizams by Aurangzeb.

== Family ==
He was married to his predecessor Abdullah Qutb Shah's third daughter, who became known as Badshah Bibi after his ascension. He had five children:

- eldest daughter: stayed unmarried and remained her father's constant companion until his death.
- second daughter: married Sikandar Adil Shah, the ruler of Bijapur.
- third daughter: married 'Inayat Khan, son of Jumdatu'l-Mulk Asad Khan.
- fourth daughter: married Shaikh Muhammad Sarhindi.
- Khuda Banda or Banda-i Sultan: the only son; was born during his father's captivity and was taken to an unknown location following the latter's death, after which nothing further is known. As per some accounts he was relocated to the coastal town of Karwar

== Legacy of the term "Tana Shah" ==
The epithet Tana Shah, originally applied to Abul Hasan Qutb Shah, gradually evolved in meaning and entered common Indo-Persian and modern Indo-Aryan vocabulary as a synonym for a "tyrant" or "dictator".

According to local traditions in the Deccan, Abul Hasan was affectionately called "Tani Shah" or "Tana Shah" by his spiritual mentor, the Sufi saint Syed Shah Raju Qattal Hussaini of Hyderabad. In this context, the title meant child saint, benevolent ruler, or pious king.

Over time, however, the name acquired a negative sense in northern Indian languages, especially Urdu and Hindi, where tānāshāh (तानाशाह / تانا شاہ) came to denote an autocratic or despotic ruler. Lexicographers trace this semantic shift to Persian influence, where tānā implies harshness or tyranny and shāh means "king".

Historians suggest that later Mughal chroniclers and colonial writers may have contributed to this reinterpretation, portraying Abul Hasan’s reign as indulgent and ineffective. As a result, his title passed into idiomatic usage as a byword for arbitrary rule or dictatorship in much of South Asia.

== See also ==
- Siege of Golconda
- Qutb Shahi dynasty

Preceded by Abdullah Qutb Shah	Qutb Shahi dynasty 1518–1687	Succeeded by Alamgir I
