= Karaga (festival) =

Folk dance of Karnataka, India

Karaga is a folk festival of Karnataka which originated as a ritual dedicated to Draupadi as known in these parts as Droupadmma. The ritual is performed on a full moon day.

The ritual pot filled with water and adorned with decorations several feet high is carried by the priest. The dancers perform various acrobatic feats while following the procession accompanied by a number of musical instruments like 'Thavi', "Nadaswaram", "Muni", "Udukka", "Pamba", etc. The most famous places where karaga festival is celebrated is in Dharmaraya Temple, also known as Bengaluru Karaga and in Sri Renuka Yellamma Temple, Chunchaghatta. Miraculously upon the completion of the procession of Karaga, it rains which symbolizes the acceptance of Droupadmma. Usually the head priest of the respective temple bears the elliptical oval shaped decoration primarily adorned with jasmine or Malli Huwu.
