= Places of worship in Bengaluru =

- Metropolis
- Location in Karnataka, India
- Coordinates: 12.9627°N 77.5758°E
- Country: India
- State: Karnataka
- District: Bengaluru Urban

Area
  - Total: 741 km^{2} (286 sq mi)
- Elevation: 900 m (3,000 ft)

Languages
  - Official: Kannada
- Time zone: UTC+5:30 (IST)

Bengaluru, the capital of Karnataka state, India, reflects its multireligious and cosmopolitan character by its more than 1000 temples, 400 mosques, 100 churches, 40 Jain derasars, three Sikh gurdwaras, two Buddhist viharas and one Parsi fire temple located in an area of 741 km^{2} of the metropolis. The religious places are further represented to include the few members of the Jewish community who are making their presence known through the Chabad that they propose to establish in Bengaluru and the fairly large number of the Baháʼí Faith whose presence is registered with a society called the Baháʼí Centre.

In the demographically diverse, major economic hub and India's fastest-growing major metropolis of Bengaluru, the number of religious places of each religion reported reflects growth in proportion to the population growth. According to the 2001 census of India, 79.37% of Bengaluru's population is Hindu, roughly the same as the national average. Muslims comprise 13.37% of the population, which again is roughly the same as the national average, while Christians and Jains account for 5.79% and 1.05% of the population, respectively, double that of their national averages. Anglo-Indians also form a substantial group within the city.

== Hindus and temples ==
The thousand and odd number of Hindu temples in Bengaluru mirrors the majority population of the city whose earliest traditional Hindu temple is traced to the Domlur Chokkanatha temple of the Chola dynasty period (10th century). The next oldest temple is the Halasuru Someshwara Temple Ulsoor (of the Hoysala Empire built between the 12th and 13th centuries – a combination of Hoysala, Chola, and Vijayanagara architecture), which was renovated and beautified by three generations of the Yelahanka dynasty-–Gidde Gowda, Kempe Gowda I and II.

=== Halasuru Someshwara Temple, Halasuru ===
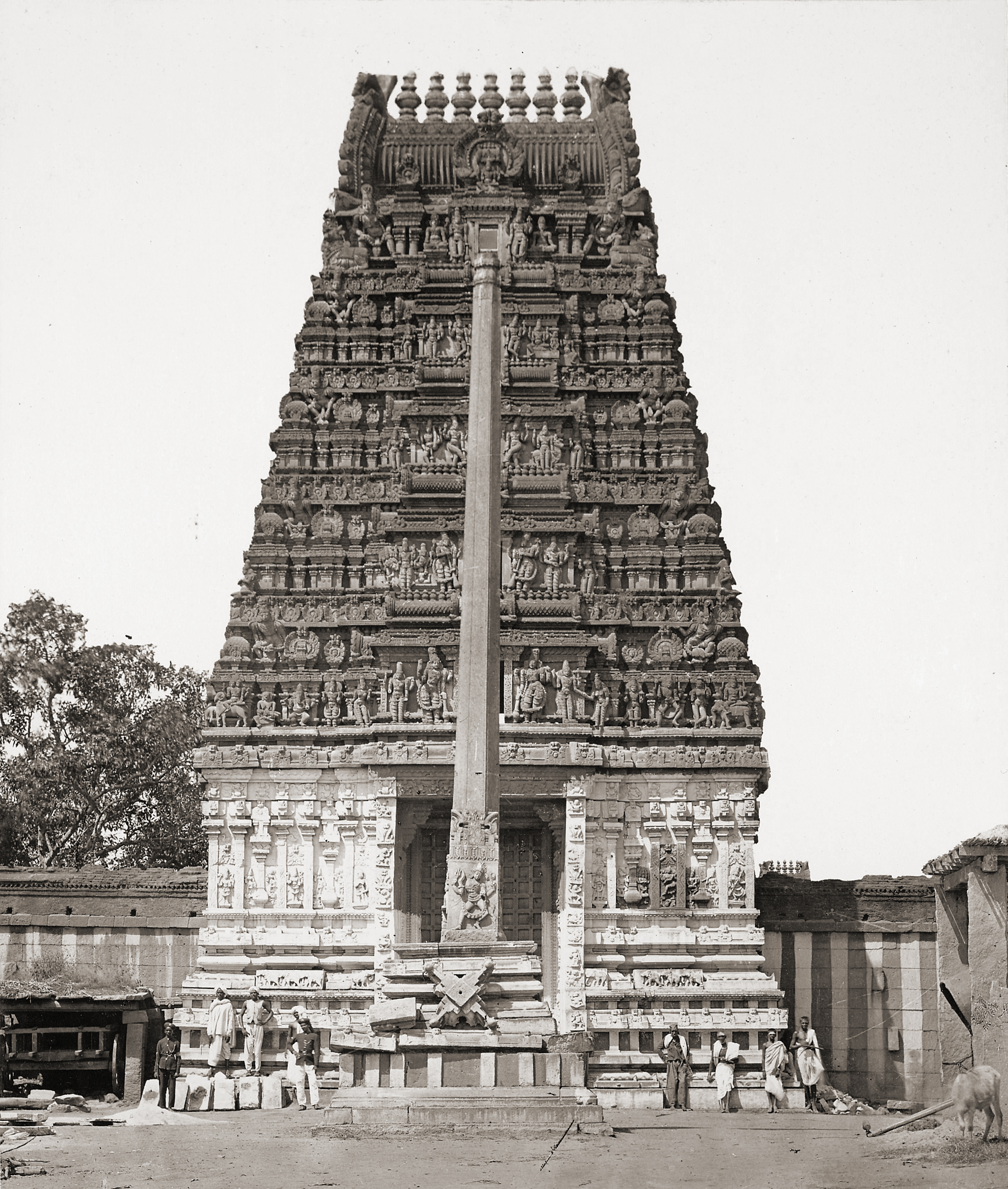
Halasuru Someshwara temple in 1890

Halasuru Someshwara Temple in Halasuru (Ulsoor) is a dedicated to the deity Someshwara (the Hindu god Shiva). It is the oldest temple in the city and dates back to the Chola period. Irrespective of when the initial consecration took place, art historian George Michell believes there were major additions or modifications during the late Vijayanagara Empire period, during the rule of Hiriya Kempe Gowda II. According to a folk legend of this oldest temple, it is said that Kempe Gowda, tired after hunting, rested under a tree and fell asleep on the present site of the temple. Lord Someshwara appeared to him in a dream, revealing the existence of hidden treasure and told him to build the temple dedicated to him with it.

=== Gavi Gangadhareshwara Temple, Gavipura ===
Another ancient temple is the Gavi Gangadhareshwara Temple in Gavipura, it is constructed in the Chola style of architecture, which is a protected monument under the Karnataka Ancient and Historical Monuments, and Archaeological Sites and Remains Act 1961. It is a cave temple dedicated to Lord Shiva. It is one of the best architectural monuments depicting a monolithic idol of Lord Shiva made of granite, a rare idol of Agni, the God of fire and monolithic exquisitely carved four pillars inside the cave. The cave temple is also stated to be a fine piece of Indian rock-cut architecture of the 9th century. In the 16th century, Kempe Gowdas added grandeur to the temple by building the frontage to the cave temple with Gopuras (towers), large tridents, discs known as Suryapana and Chandrapana representing the Sun and the Moon, a damaru (drum) and two fans (all pictured in the gallery). Another interesting astronomical feature which attracts thousands of devotees to the temple on Makar Sankranti day in January is of sun rays passing between the horns of the Nandi (bull), located outside at the entrance to the temple, which lights the idol of Shiva inside the cave.

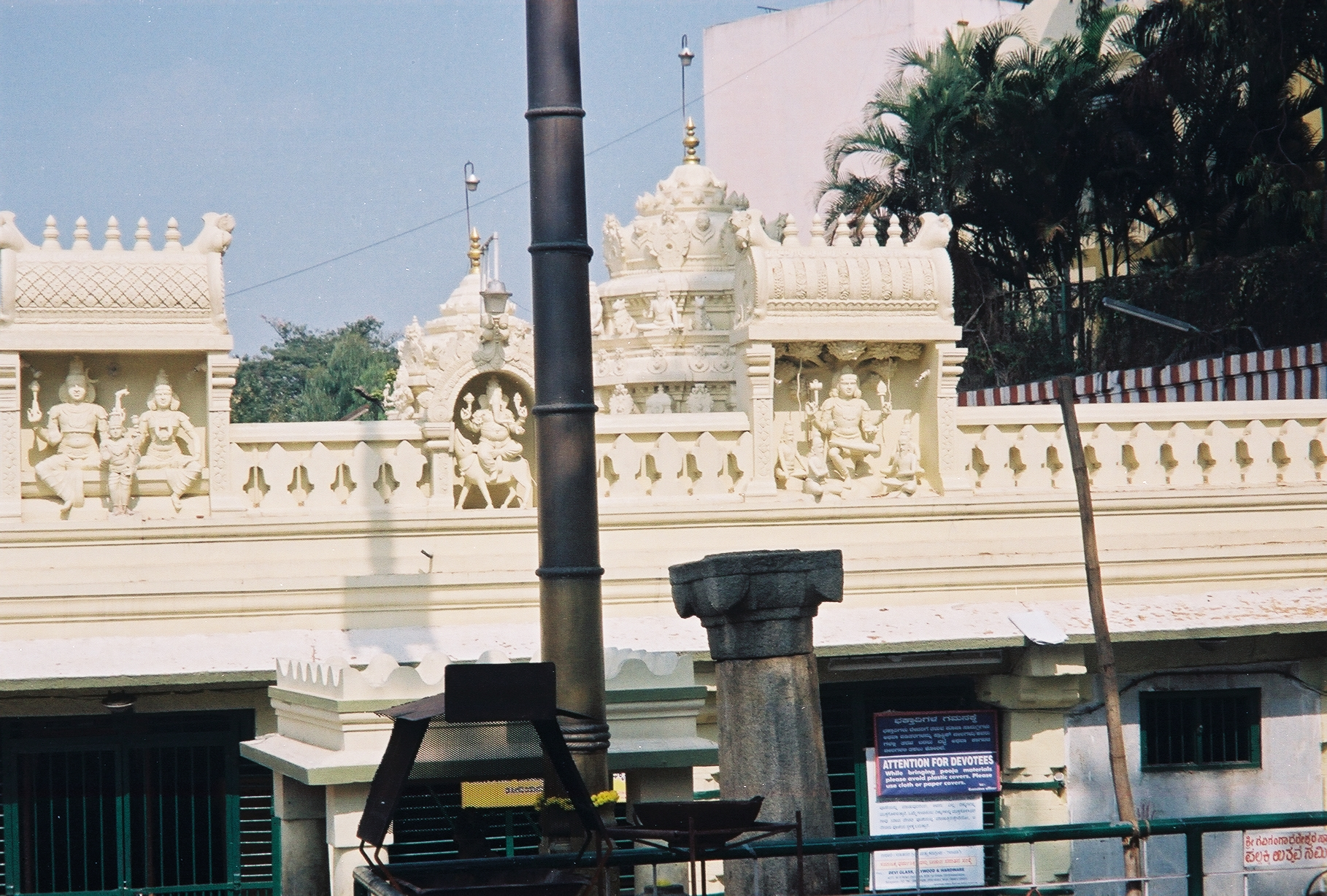
One of the oldest cave temples in Bengaluru

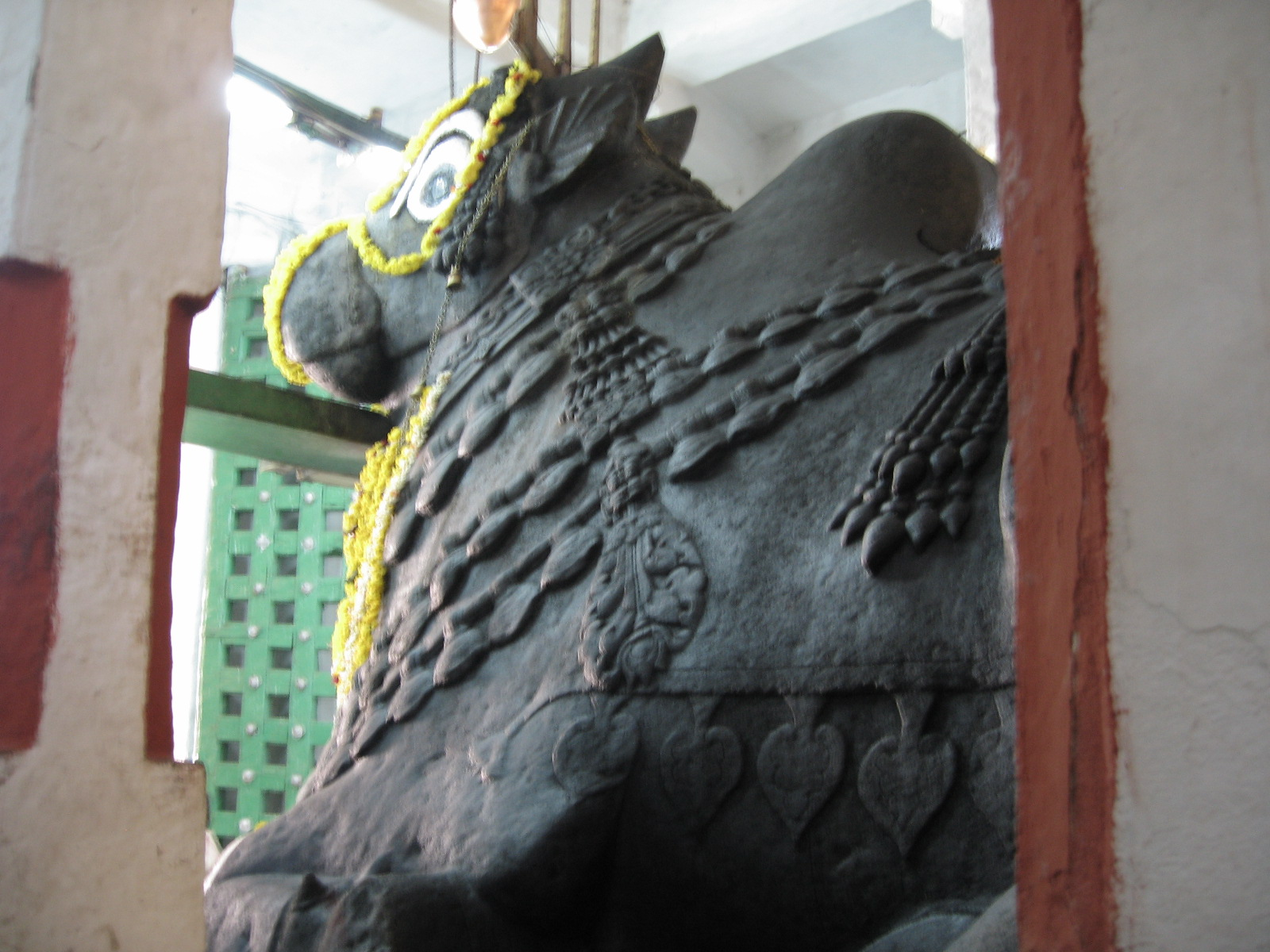
One of the biggest Nandi idols in the world

=== Nandi Temple, Basavanagudi ===
A famous temple built in the 16th century during the rule of Kempegowdas, is the Bull temple or the Nandi Temple (‘Nandi' in Sanskrit means ‘joyful') made of granite. This temple built in 1537 on a hill top with a porch in the Vijayanagara architectural style is named after the large granite Nandi monolith placed on a plinth in the temple shrine. The temple is exclusive for the worship of the sacred bull in Hinduism, known as Nandi, Lord Shiva's vahana, or animal mount. Nandi idol at this temple is said to be one of the largest in the world, with height of about 15 ft (4.6 m) and 20 feet (6.1 m) length. Temples for Dodda Ganapathy (huge Ganesha -– 10 ft (3.0 m) height & 15 ft (4.6 m) wide) and for Lord Shiva, a little above the Ganesha temple, are also located at the foot of the hill. A groundnut fair called Kadalekay Parishe in Kannada language, which is linked to a popular folklore legend, is held by farmers every year during November to thank Nandi for the good yield of this crop and to seek further blessings.

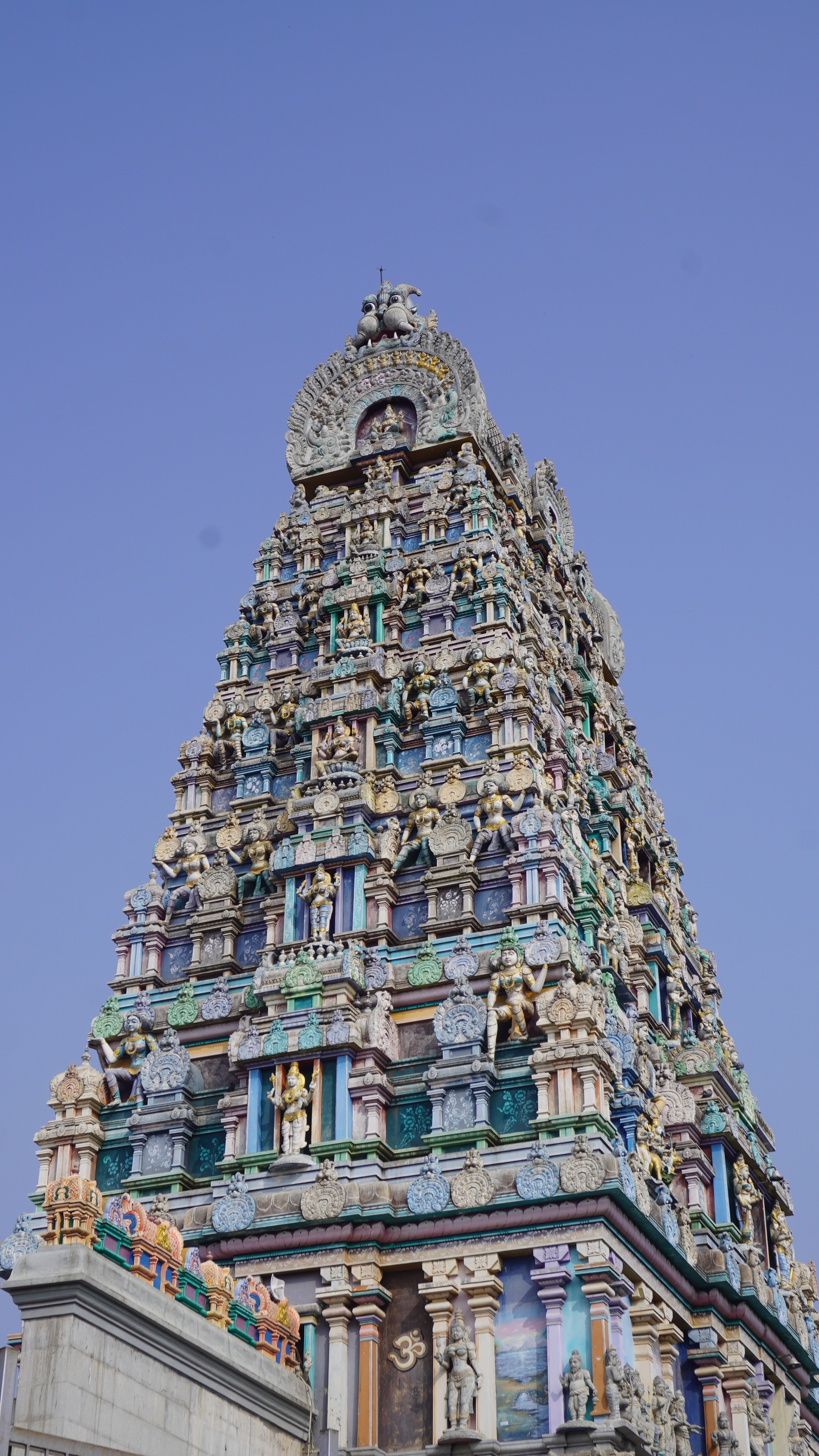
Sri Rajarajeshwari Temple

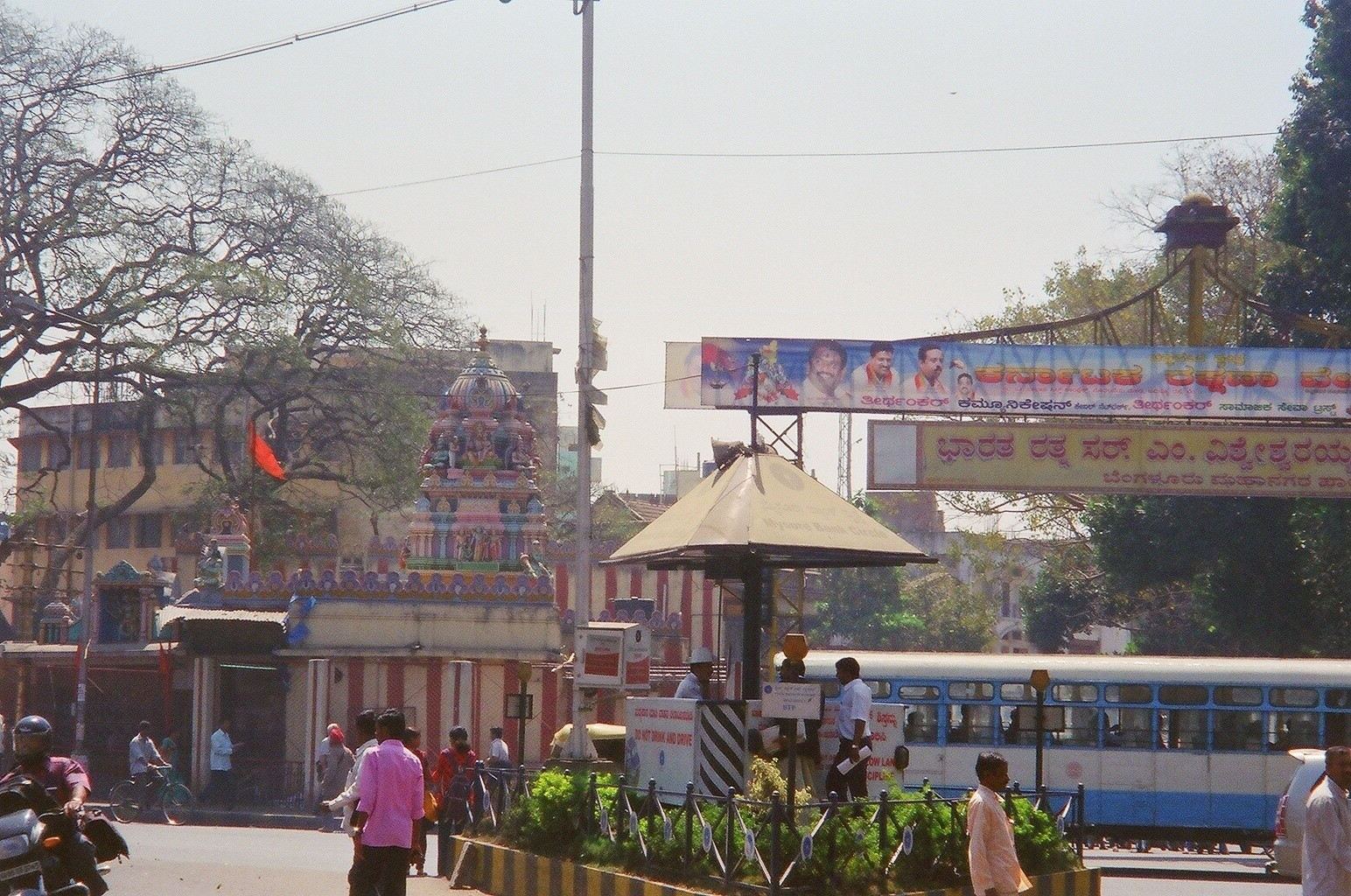
One of the oldest Hanuman temples at Yelahanka gate in the heart of Bengaluru

=== Jnanakshi Rajarajeshwari Temple, Rajarajeshwari Nagara ===
Rajarajeshwari Nagar is home to the Jnanakshi Rajarajeshwari Temple. Shri Rajarajeshwari is the temple's principal deity. The temple was built by Sri Sivaratnapuri Swamiji, also called Sri Tiruchi Swamigal, in 1978. the idol of Sri Rajarajeshwari, who is a manifestation of Sri Lalita Tripurasundari. According to the Tantra Chudamani, this temple is thought to be the "ear" or "karnabhaga" of Bharat's numerous Shaktipeethas. Located between the Cauvery and Vrishabhavati rivers, it was formerly known as Kanchanagiri. Jaya Peetha is the name of the governing Bhairava, Abiru Bhairava.

Shri Nimishamba Devi Temple, Rajarajeshwari Nagara

The Shri Nimishamba Devi temple is located at Rajarajeshwari Nagara. This shrine is built in the traditional Parashurama Kshetra architectural style, which is not found elsewhere in Bangalore or its surroundings. This temple was built with the help of a large number of devotees of Shri Nimishamba Devi. The temple has shrines of Devi Nimishamba, Moukthikeswara (Lord Shiva), Siddhi Vinayaka, Saraswathi and Lakshmi Narayana. Chandika Homa is performed every day in a specially designed Yagna Shala. The temple also has Annadana on most days.

=== Sri Radha Krishna Temple, Rajajinagara ===
Sri Radha Krishna Temple or ISKCON Temple, has deities of Radha and Krishna located on top of the Hare Krishna Hill in Rajajinagara, in the. It is one of the largest ISKCON temples in the world. The temple is a huge cultural complex that was inaugurated in 1997 by Shankar Dayal Sharma and Jayapataka Swami following the wishes of A.C. Bhaktivedanta Swami Prabhupada, the Founder-Acarya of ISKCON to promote Vedic culture and spiritual learning. Janmashtami, Vaikuntha Ekadashi and Rath Yatra are the major festivals celebrated.

=== Other temples ===
Apart from the above famous temples, the other temples built between the 16th and 19th centuries are also numerous and some of the well known ones with interesting history are the

- Karanji Anjaneya Swamy Temple, Basavanagudi
- Sri Bande Mahakali Temple, Gavipura Guttahalli
- Sri Pralayakala Veerabadrar temple, Gavipura Guttahalli
- Sri Kalabhairaveshwara Temple, Chamarajapete
- Belli Basavanna Temple, Mamulpete
- Sri Yelahanka Gate Anjaneya Swamy Temple, Bangalore Fort, Avenue Road, Ballurupete
- Sri Dharmarayaswamy Temple, Thigalarpete, Nagarathpete
- Sri Sugreeva Venkataramana Swamy Temple, Balepete
- Kadu Mallikarjuna Swamy Temple, Malleswara
- Kote Venkataramana Swamy Temple, Tipu Sultan's Palace
- Kashi Vishveshwara Swamy Temple, Sowrashtrapete
- Sri Prasanna Krishna Swamy Temple, Tulasi Thota, Upparpete
- Sri Mookambika Bhakta Mandali, Mahalakshmi Layout
- Ragigudda Sri Prasanna Anjaneyaswamy Temple, Jayanagara

Many temples have been built by ordinary citizens and are also patronised by certain communities such as the Devanga, Golla, Besta (fisherfolk), Uppara, Goniga, Kshaurika (barber), Nagartha, Ganiga (oilfolk), Vishwakarma, and so forth. The most popular temples listed are that of Hanuman (the monkey God), 635 numbers, and the oldest of them is reported to be the Shri Gali Anjaneya temple on Mysore Road, said to have been established in 1425 by Vyasaraja.

== Muslims and mosques ==
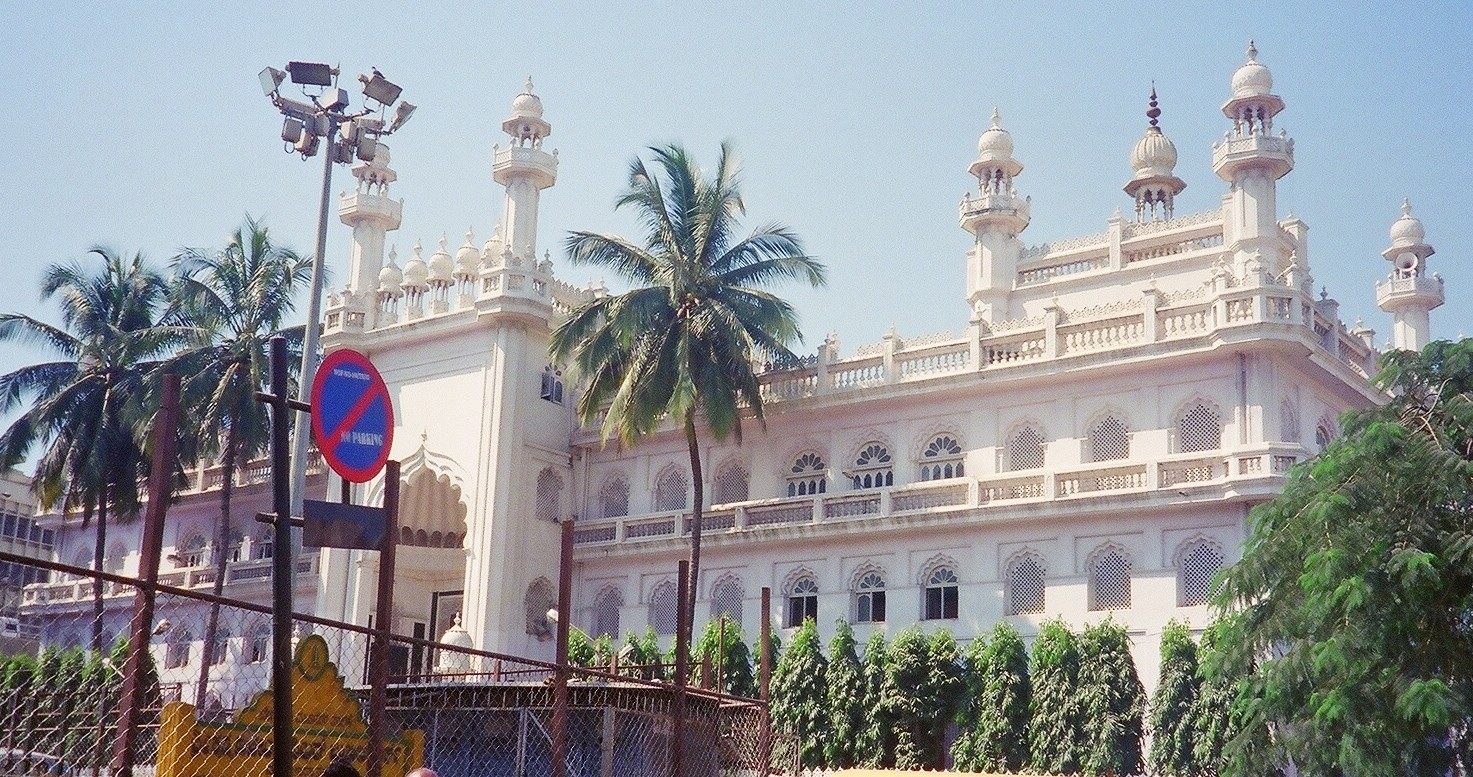
The Jamia Masjid off NR road near city Market.

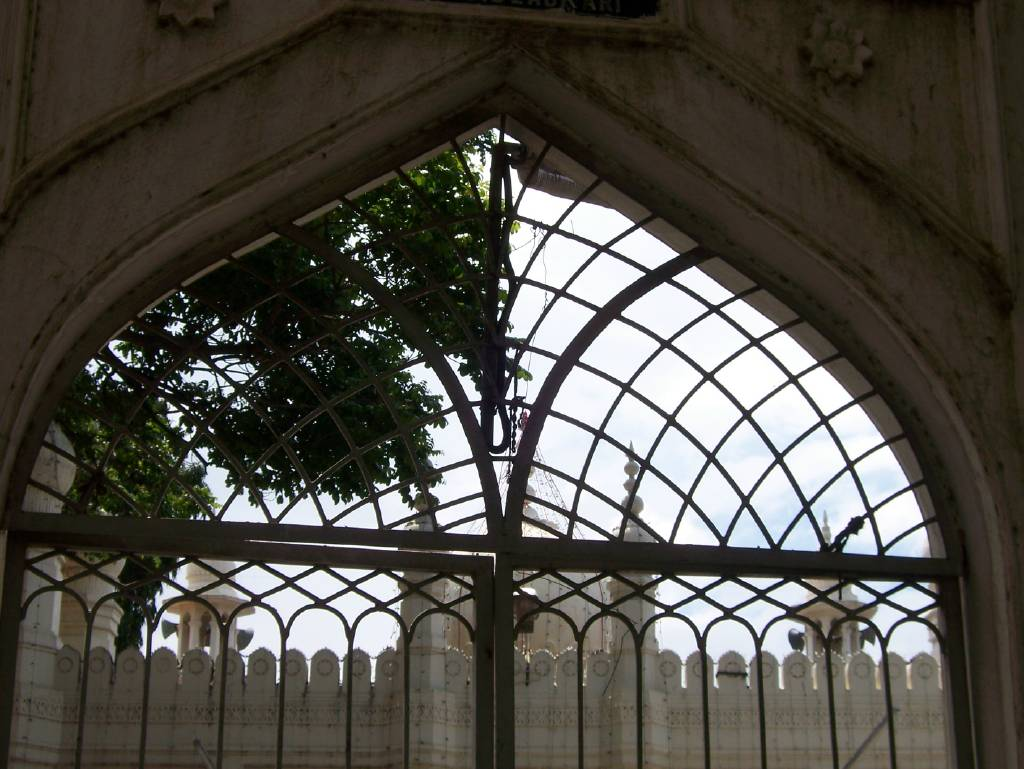
A view from the masjid e Askari in Johnson market.

The earliest recorded history of Islamic influence in Bangalore could be traced to 1638, when the old Bengaluru Pete (now an integral part of the Bangalore city) was conquered by Bijapur Sultanate who ruled for the next 50 years. The Mughal general Khasim Khan captured Bangalore in 1687 and leased the town and the surrounding areas to Chikkadeva Raya Wodeyar of the Kingdom of Mysore, in 1690 AD. In 1761, Hyder Ali became the Sarvadhikari of Bangalore. The Mysore Sultanate which lasted from 1761 to 1799 saw the construction of many mosques & dargahs.

Thus, over a period of 370 years from the earliest rule of the Bijapur Sultan in 1638, Muslim shrines (mosques or masjids and darghas) have been built which now number more than 400 and indicates the large Muslim population of the city. Some of the important mosques and darghas in Bangalore are mentioned below.

=== Jamia Masjid ===
Jamia Masjid, situated near the City Market, Bengaluru Urban, is the most impressive mosque in Bangalore. Designed by Rayyaz Asifuddin of Hyderabad, it was built in 1940 with white marble from Rajasthan and is dedicated to Tipu Sultan. This landmark has bulbous domes, twin towers standing on exquisitely carved granite pillars and fashioned jali work in the balcony. It is a five–storeyed structure, with space to accommodate up to 10,000 devotees. With an ablution pool in the centre of mosque, the ambiance inside the mosque is cool, serene and airy. In the elevated prayer hall of the mosque, beautiful bubris (frescoes) that bear mark of Tipu Sultan have been revealed, after removing the old plaster. Muslims in large numbers congregate here during the death anniversary of Tipu Sultan, to mark the "Tipu Urs".

Then president of Egypt, Gamal Abdel Nasser, visited the mosque during his trip to India. Nasser gifted carpets and a chandelier from Egypt to the mosque. While the carpets had worn out, the chandelier still hung strong. The calligraphy at the mosque entrance was also gifted by Nasser.

=== The Jumma Masjid ===
The Jumma Masjid located on the Old Poor House Road in the Cantonment area of the city is also said to be one of the oldest mosques, built by Haji Abdul Quddus in the early 19th century. While the raised prayer hall of the mosque has granite pillars, the building as such is a brick and mortar structure with ornate jali work and floral motifs in plaster on the facade. The granite pillars were bought from Tipu Sultan's palace in Srirangapatna.

The Sangian Jamia Masjid in Taramandalpet was built by the Mughal General Khasim Khan in 1687. It was demolished in the 80's and today a much larger modern mosque stands in its place.

=== Haji Sir Ismail Sait Mosque ===
Haji Sir Ismail Sait Mosque Hajee Sir Ismail Sait Masjid · Mosque Rd, Pulikeshi Nagar, Bangalore, Karnataka 560005, India (named after Haji Sir Ismail Sait, a prominent Gujarati speaking Kutchi Memon merchant of Bangalore Cantonment who built the mosque), is located in Fraser Town. It was built at a time when there were only a few Muslims in the suburb. Haji Sir Ismail Sait arrived in Bangalore in 1870 from Cutch, Gujarat with his parents. After the demise of his father in started a small business on his own in 1874, and prospered expanding his business around Bangalore and also Madras, trading in goods and Kerosene. At the same time, he was involved in philanthropy and charitable work. Haji Sir Ismail Sait was honoured by the Mysore Government with the title ‘Fakrut-Tujjar', and the British Government knighted him at the Buckingham Palace in recognition of his philanthropy. Haji Sir Ismail Sait also served as a member of the Madras Presidency Legislative Council in 1911. Sir Ismail Sait also founded the Sir Ismail Sait Government Urdu Model Primary Boys and Girls School Hajee Sir Ismail Sait Masjid · Mosque Rd, Pulikeshi Nagar, Bangalore, Karnataka 560005, India, an Urdu Primary School on Mosque Road and the Gosha Hospital Govt. Hsis Gosha Hospital · Venkataswamy Naidu Rd, near KSPCB Limited, Tasker Town, Shivaji Nagar, Bangalore, Karnataka 560051, India at Shivajinagar.

=== Masjid-E-Khadria ===
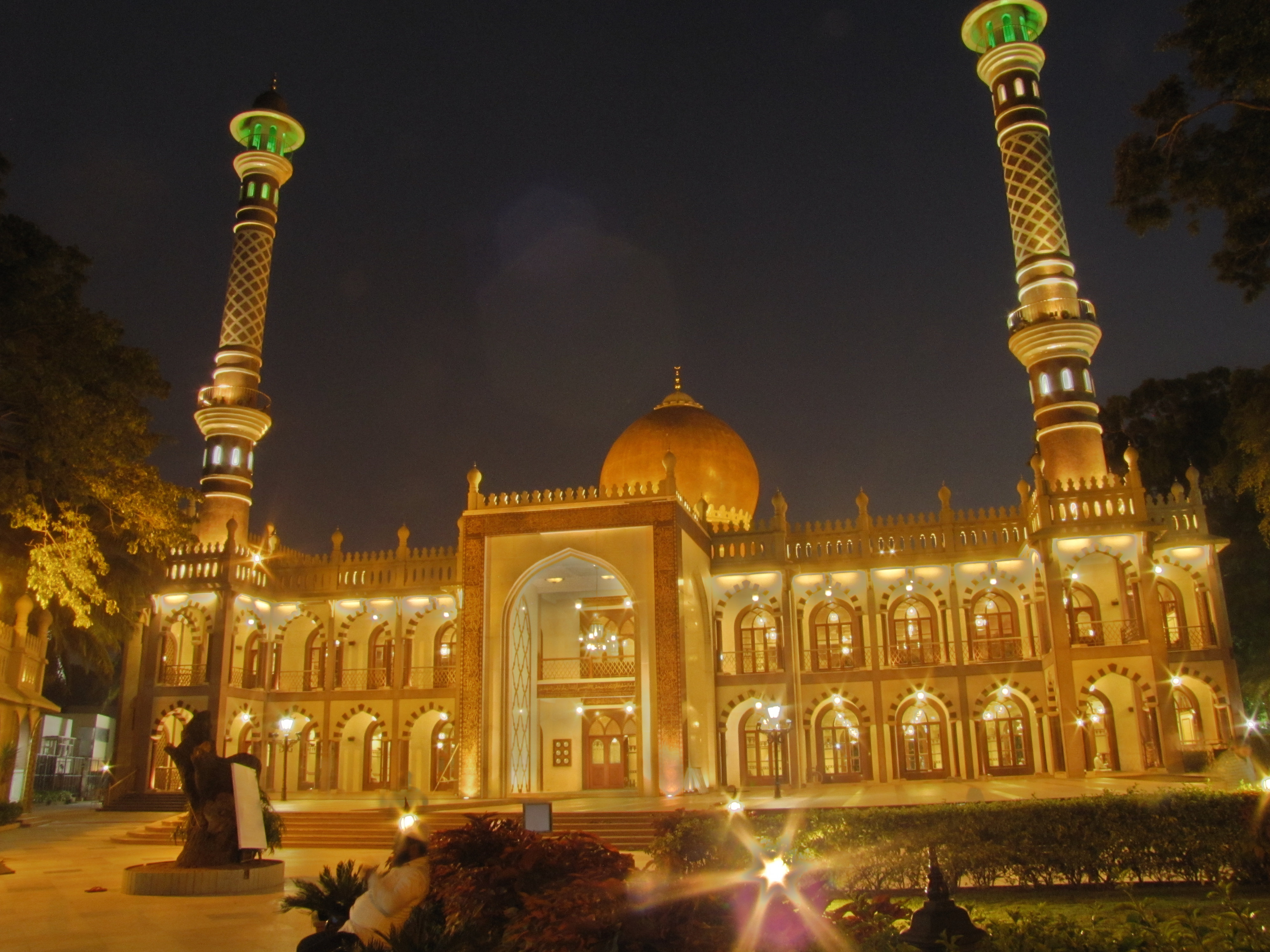
Masjid E Khadria next to the Cantonment Railway station.

Masjid-e-Khadriya is a mosque in the heart of Bangalore city designed by Renowned Architect Sajjad Ali Khan in the southern state of Karnataka in India. It is situated on Millers Road in the city inside an Eidgah ground. The mosque is very close to the Bangalore Cantonment Railway station, The Eidgah ground where this mosque is housed is called Quddus Sahib Eidgah.

Masjid-e-Khadriya is made using Islamic architecture with geometric patterns and surrounded by gardens with fountains. One can see pointed arches and onion shaped domes with a grand arch in the opening gate of this masjid. This grand arch is rectangular in shape and adorned with calligraphy. On All 4 sides at the end of the masjid are high minars. Beautiful landscaping has been done on broad pathways that start from the grand arch leading up to the complex.

The prayer hall has a capacity of 2125 people who can offer prayers at the same time. There are three doors each being 16 feet wide in this hall on northern, southern, and eastern sides. There is capacity of 1980 musallis on the first floor also. There are three staircases, 2 on the eastern side and one on the southern side to allow for easy movement of the people.

The mosque is located at a distance of 5.5 km from Majestic (Bangalore city bus stand) and Bangalore City Railway Station.

=== Other mosques ===
Of the many other older masjids in the city, the important ones are the Ibrahim Shah Khan Shutari Masjid built in 1761 (at Kumbarpete) by Hyder Khilledar Ibrahim Khan and the Bademakan Masjid (Siddiah Road) built during Hyder Ali's period. Masjid-e-Eidgah Bilal and Masjid Al Noor are two large and beautiful mosques built by the Prestige Group. Modi Masjid is also the oldest masjid in the Cantonment area, it has been reconstructed and is the latest large mosque addition to Bangalore's mosques space.

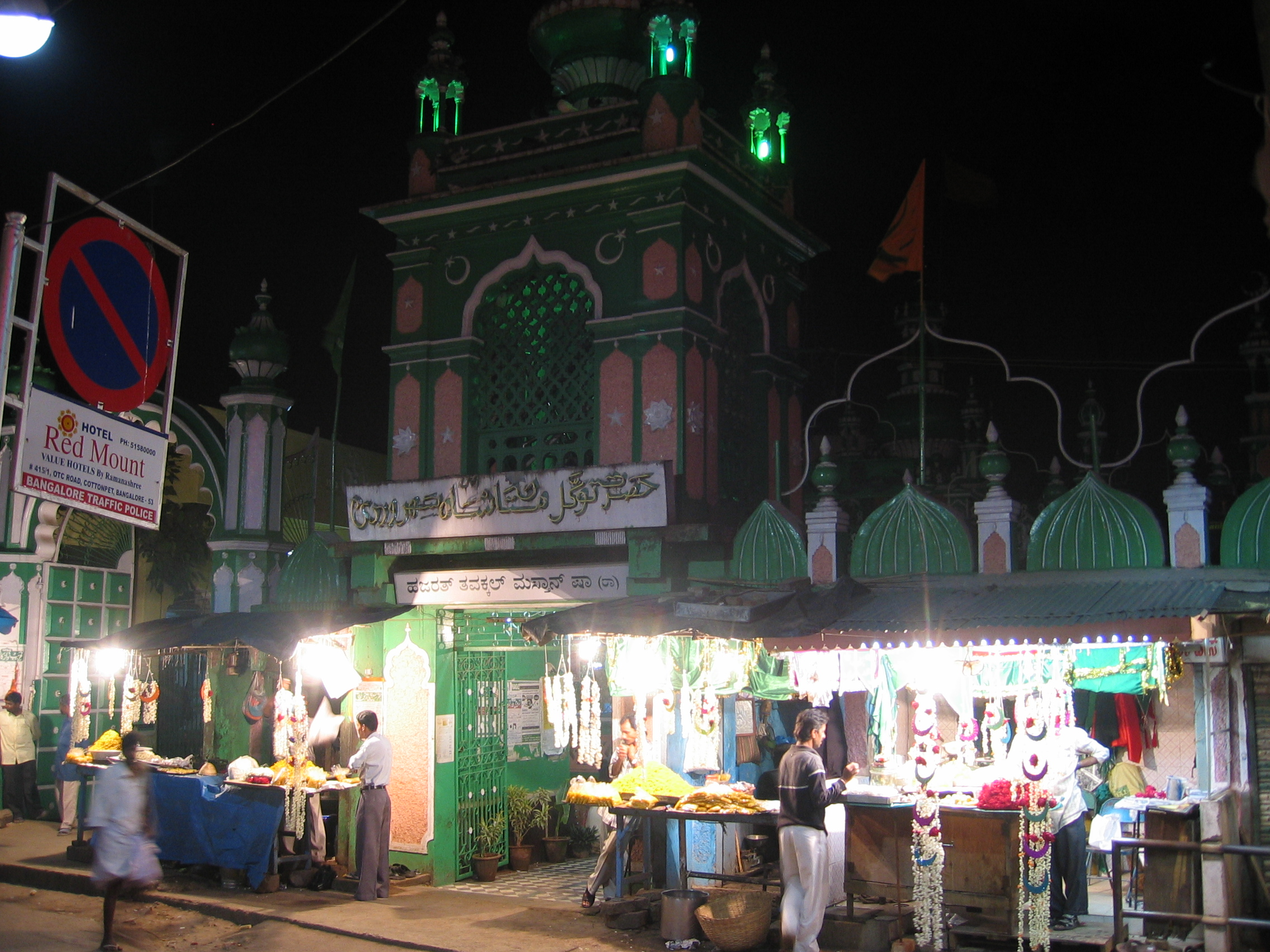
Tawakkal Mosque and dargah in Cottonpet.

Masjid-E-Quba, Yarabnagar one of the beautiful Mosque (330). The mosque has the highest minaret in Bangalore.

== Christianity and churches ==
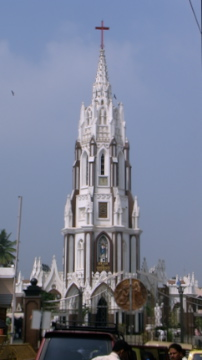
St. Mary's Basilica - Oldest church in Bengaluru

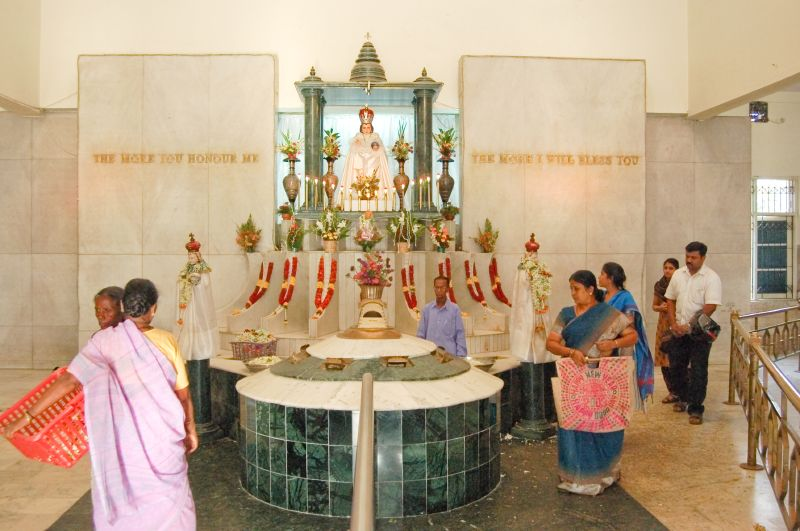
Infant Jesus Church

Bangalore with recorded number of 40 churches (thus also called the city of churches), represents diverse Christian communities, such as the Roman Catholic Church, Protestants of the Church of South India (which includes Anglican, Wesleyan and other older denominations), Kerala based Syrian denominations and newer evangelical groups with links to the United States.

It was in the year 1648 that Christianity made its first mark in Srirangapatna, the capital city of the then Kingdom of Mysore. Bangalore was not a big city in those days. Even though the first church in Bangalore was dated to the years 1724–1725, the spread of Christianity suffered a decline during Tipu Sultan's rule. However, the history of revival of Christianity in Bangalore is traced to the year 1799 when the French priest Abbé du Bois came to Bangalore, at a time when the British seized Srirangapatna from Tipu Sultan. He restored the Christian religion in the city by building confidence of the Christians living in and around Bangalore in Somanahalli, Kamanahalli, Begur, Gunjam, Palahalli, Doranahalli, Garenahalli, Shettyhalli and other villages and by extending them spiritual solace. His acts of service to the people also involved introduction of vaccination in India.

=== Roman Catholic Churches ===
==== St. Mary's Basilica ====
St. Mary's Basilica had a humble beginning as an attached hut in the 17th century, built by Tamil Christian migrants from Gingee. The Shrine was then known as 'Chapel of Kanikkai Madha' and was located in their village where rice was grown. The rice grown in the village had a distinct white colour, and hence the settlement came to known as Bili Akki Palli or colloquially known as Blackpally (now known as Shivajinagar). However, according to well known historian S K Aruni, Blackpally could have been named after John Blakiston (1785–1867), who designed the layout of the Bangalore Cantonment. With the establishment of the cantonment at Bangalore, Jean Dubois led a mass for both Europeans and Indians in 1799, after the fall of Seringapatam. In 1811, Jean Dubois built small chapel along with residence for the Catholic priests. Later Andreas, a priest from Pondicherry of Indian origin, expanded the church building in the shape of a cross. However this church was torn down during the communal riots of 1832, and troops had to be called in to protect the settlement for many months. The current form of the majestic Gothic-style church (pictured) is credited to L. E. Kleiner. It was consecrated on 8 September 1882 by Bishop Jean-Yves-Marie Coadou, the vicar apostolic of Mysore. Over the years, the church of St. Mary's at Blackpally became a parish and was elevated to the status of minor basilica in 1973 through an order by Pope Paul VI (The church was the sixth church in India to be elevated to this status). Stained glass windows and multiple columns with a rich Corinthian capital support the stately arches of the Church. An annual 9 day Novena is held between 30 August and 7 September, with Mass being offered in English, Kannada and Tamil.

==== St Patrick's Church ====
St Patrick's Church located on Brigade road is the second oldest church in the city (around 160 years old - foundation laid in July 1841). Father Chevalier was responsible for building the church, which was consecrated as a cathedral in 1899. The foundation was laid in July 1841 and the building was completed in 1844. In 1887, the Catholic Hierarchy for southern India Pope Leo XIII was proclaimed in this church in 1887. Renovated in 1894–98, on 12 November 1899 the church was consecrated as St. Patrick's Cathedral. It has a beautiful arched entrance flanked by twin columns. The interior of the church has twelve graceful pillars which symbolise the twelve apostles. The twin spires of the Church are a landmark in the city cantonment.

==== Infant Jesus Church ====
Infant Jesus Church at Vivek Nagar, which is now the biggest church in Karnataka and a popular pilgrimage centre, has a long history of sacrifice and devotion. The Church was first conceived by Paul Kinatukara in the sixties and the foundation was laid in April 1970 by Lourduswamy, the then Archbishop of Bangalore. The missionary zeal (in spite of daunting hurdles) of L. Peter established the church on a firm footing and the church was opened to devotees in the year 1979, to honour and glorify the divine Infant Jesus of Prague. Designed by the Architects of Thomas Associates, the church with a fan shaped hall can accommodate about 2500 people. It has 9 faces and openings running all round the church. People seated anywhere in the interior of the church feel that the altar is facing them. The podium is raised above road level with steps and ramp on either side. The replica of the nativity scene in the nativity church of Jerusalem is the main mural of size 6 mi (9.7 km)x 9 mi (14.5 km). The remarkable feature of the church is the secular nature of the devotees who throng seeking blessings, particularly on Thursdays and Saturdays. St Mary's Feast is celebrated in September every year when devotees gather at the Church dressed in saffron colour.

==== Shelter House Church ====
Shelter House Church is located in Arekere main road, Bannerghatta road.

Other prominent Churches built in Bangalore under the overall directions of the parish were the St. Francis Xavier's Cathedral (1851), St. Joseph's Church (1867) and the Sacred Heart Church, Ashokanagara (1867) and many others.

The other old churches in Bangalore are the St. Luke's (Fort, 1830), the St. Joseph's (Briand Square, 1857), the St. Patrick's (Brigade Road, 1844), the Sacred Heart's (Richmond Road, 1874) and many others.

=== Anglican / Wesleyan / CSI Churches ===
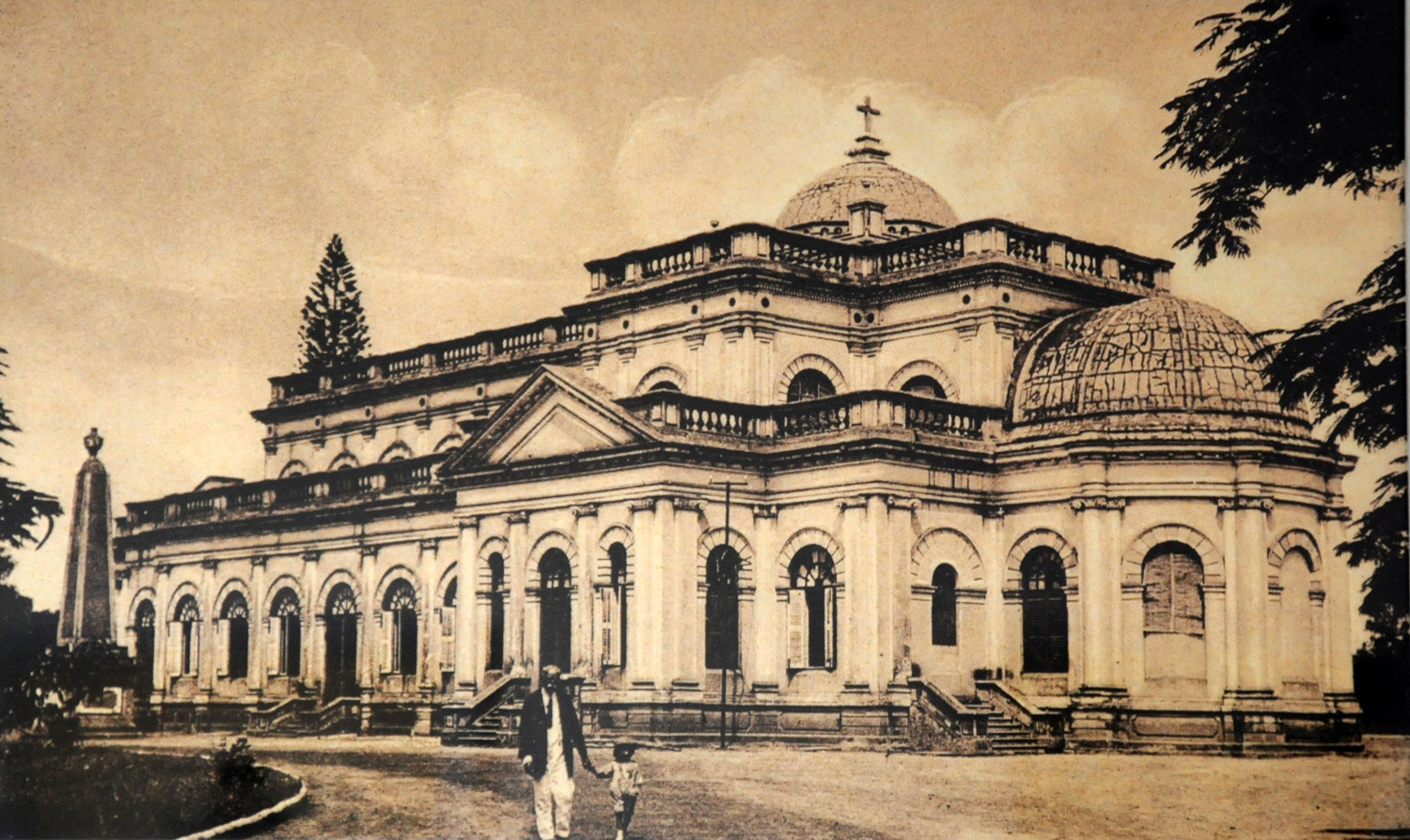
The English Baroque style St. Mark's CSI Cathedral, the oldest Christian cathedral in Bengaluru. (Old Postcard Re-print), India Post (2014).

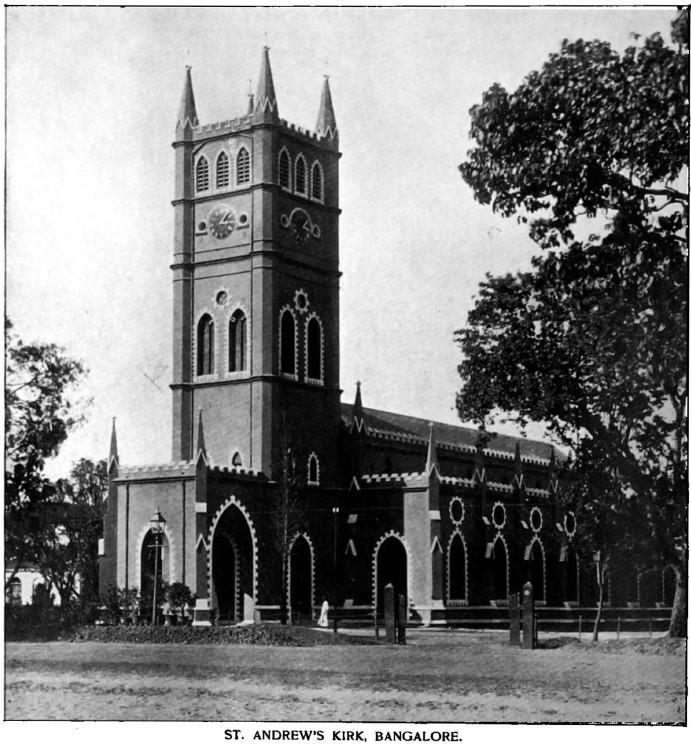
St. Andrew's Kirk, Bengaluru around 1895 - Furneaux, JH (1895) Glimpses of India. A grand photographic history of the Land of Antiquity, the vast Empire of the East

The old Protestant denominations in the region, merged after Indian independence forming the Church of South India, on September 27, 1947. Landmark CSI churches of Bangalore are the St. Mark's Cathedral (M.G. Road, 1808), Holy Trinity (M.G. Road, 1851), St. Andrew's (Cubbon Road, 1866), East Parade (Dickenson Road, 1862), Wesley Church (Promenade Road, 1896) and Hudson Memorial church (City Corporation, 1904).

==== St. Mark's Cathedral ====
St. Mark's CathedralSt. Mark's Cathedral · Shanthala Nagar, Ashok Nagar, Bengaluru, Karnataka 560001 is named after Saint Mark (believed to be the first gospel writer) and is located at the west end of Mahatma Gandhi Road, MacIver Town, Bangalore. Its architecture is inspired by the 17th century St Paul's Cathedral. The church serves as the cathedral (Ecclesia Matar) of the Church of South India, Karnataka Central Diocese. Found in 1808, the cathedral celebrated its 200 years bicentenary in 2007–8.

==== Holy Trinity Church ====
Holy Trinity Church located at Trinity circle is an exquisite landmark at the east end of the MG Road, built in 1848–51 in the English Renaissance style, and was designed by Major Pears, foundation was laid on 16 February 1848 and consecrated on 25 July 1852. The church can accommodate 700 people and is considered as the largest "military" church in South India.

==== St. Andrew's Church, Cubbon Road ====
St. Andrew's Kirk, the only Scottish kirk in Bangalore, is located on the Cubbon Road. The stained glass windows in the Church depict Lord Jesus and his eight apostles. The walls are adorned with polished brass plaques and a pipe organ installed in 1881 is also seen in the Church.

==== St. John's Church, Cleveland Town ====
St. John's ChurchSt Johns Church · Door No 132, St. John's Church Road, Cleveland Town, Pulikeshi Nagar, Bengaluru, Karnataka 560005, India is located in St. John's Hill, Cleveland Town, Bangalore Cantonment, in between Promenade Road and St. John's Church Road. The church is the fourth oldest Protestant church in the city, dedicated in 1858, it is 170 years old. It was known as seguppukoil for its distinct red edifice and towering steeple, rising out of the leafy surroundings. The church is dedicated to St. John the Evangelist.

==== St. Paul's Church, Old Poor House Road ====
St. Paul's ChurchSt. Paul's Church · Jumma Masjid Road, 1, Bowring Hospital Rd, Shivaji Nagar, Bengaluru, Karnataka 560051, India is located in the corner of Old Poor House Road, and Bowring Hospital Road, next to the Bowring and Lady Curzon Hospital, Bangalore Cantonment. St. Paul's has the distinction of being the very first Tamil Anglican Church in the erstwhile Mysore State. It celebrated its 175th anniversary in May 2014.

=== Pentecostal Churches ===
==== Bethel Assemblies of God Church, Hebbal ====
Bethel Assembly of God Church, founded in 1960, is one of the largest Pentecostal Megachurches in India, located in Bangalore, Karnataka. Affiliated with the General Council of the Assemblies of God of India. It reports over 60,000 weekly attendees and oversees more than 100 affiliated outstations. M. A. Varughese has served as Senior Pastor since 1983.

==== Life Church, Bannerghatta Road ====
Life Church is an affiliate of Church of God (full Gospel) in India. Situated at Arekere off the famed Bannerghetta road is a source of hope and blessing for many. Pradip Mathew a qualified physician, Christian thinker and Apologist is the Pastor of this church. Web address- www.lifechurch.co.in

=== Malankara Syrian Orthodox Churches ===
St. Mary's Orthodox Church located in Gangamma Circle, is a parish belongs to the Bangalore Diocese of the Indian Orthodox Church. The parish was founded in 1961 and considered as the first orthodox parish in Bangalore. St. Gregorios Cathedral at hosur road is another important church of the Indian Orthodox Church in Bangalore. There are11 orthodox churches in Bangalore namely: St. Gregorios Cathedral, Hosur road St. Mary's Valiyapalli, Jalahalli St. George Church, Indiranagar St. Baselios Church, Marathahalli Mar Yuhanon Mamdana Church, KR Puram St. Gregorios church, Mathikere St. Thomas Church, Bangalore East Mar Gregorios Church, Hebbal St. Dionysius Church, Dasarahalli St. Stephen's Church, Vijaynagar St. Mary's Church, Begur. All the churches in the Bangalore region come under the domain of the Metropolitan of the Bangalore diocese, Abraham Mar Seraphim.

== Jainism and Jain derasars ==
Jainism, traditionally known as Jainadharma, is an Indian religion and philosophy originating in Ancient India. The Jains follow the teachings of the 24 Tirthankaras and Mahavira, accepted as the founder of the faith, was the 24th and lived in the 6th century BCE. Jains have significantly influenced the religious, ethical, political and economic spheres in India for over two millennia. They are best described by the adage that "Business is in their blood. Peace is their badge." The combination makes them an extraordinary community in India and so is their case in Bangalore. Of the 40 odd Jain temples in Bangalore, Digambara-affiliated ones are fewer than the Śvetāmbara-affiliated ones. Digambara and Svethambara are the two living schools of the Jain community. Digambara monks do not wear clothes since they believe that clothes are like other possessions, increasing dependency and desire for material things, and desire for anything ultimately leads to sorrow. Śvetāmbara monks and nuns wear white, seamless clothes for practical reasons and believe there is nothing in the Jain Agamas that condemns wearing clothes.

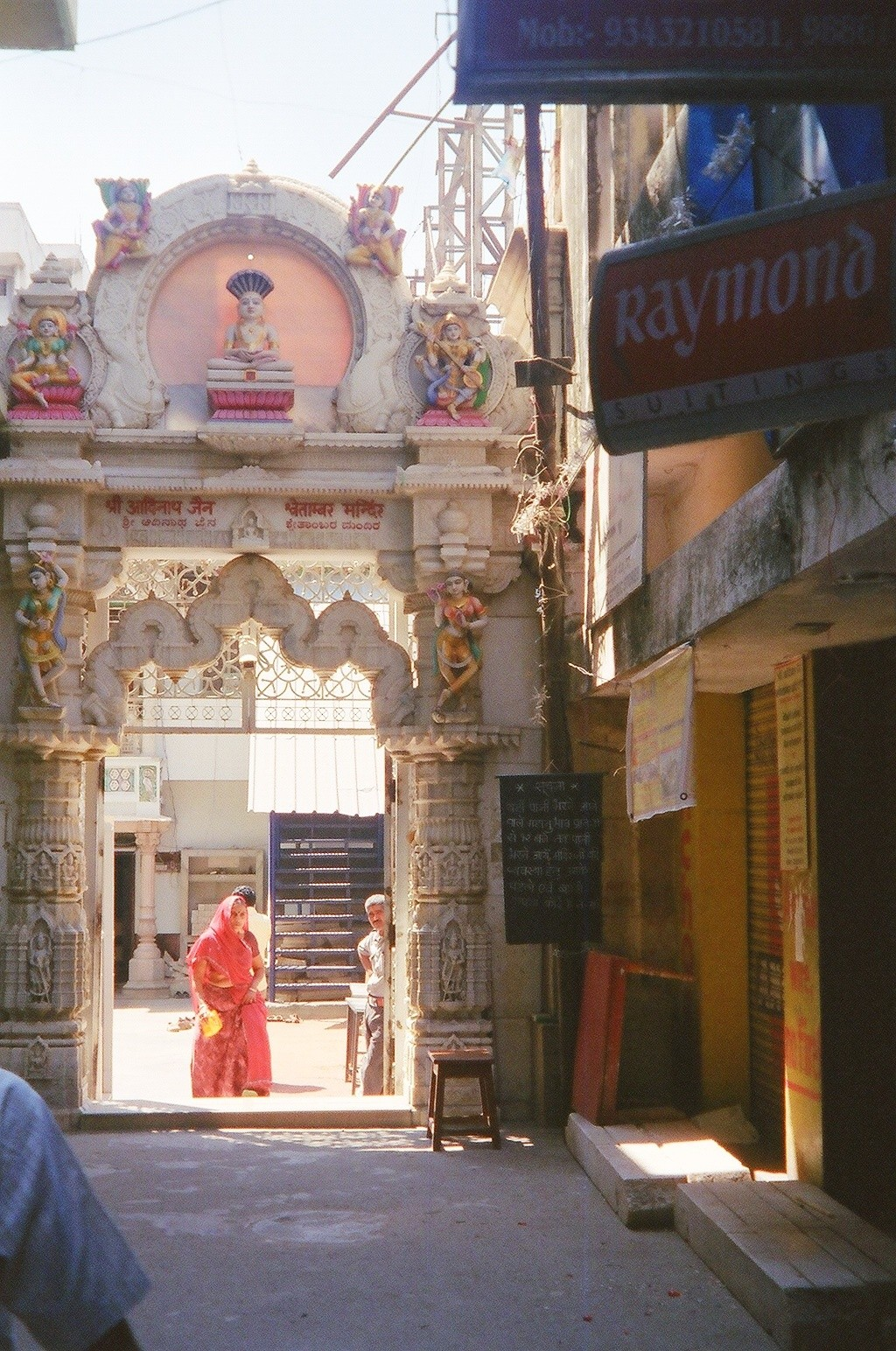
Sri Mahavira Jain temple, Chickpet area

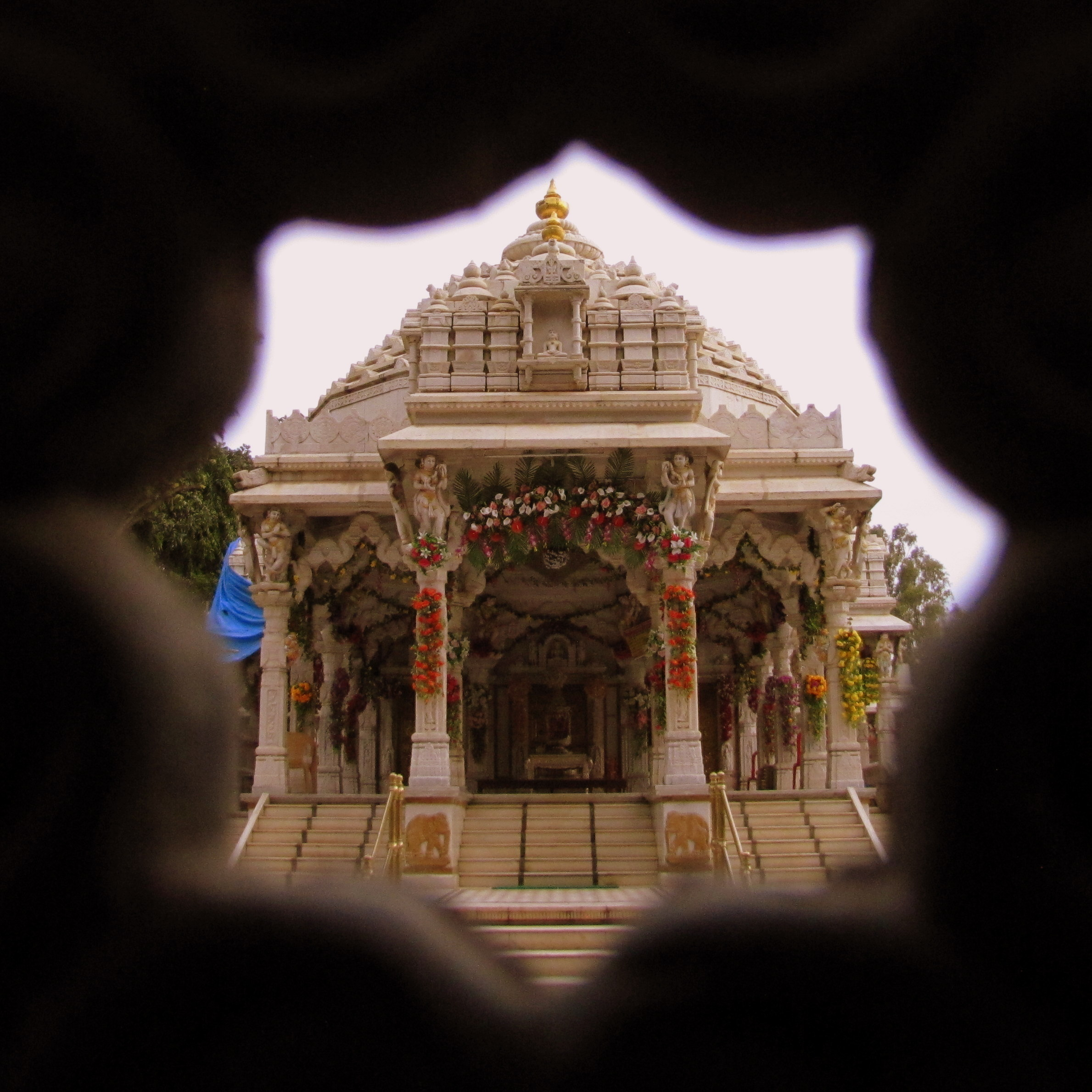
Adinath Jain temple, Jayanaga

=== Shri Mahavira Digambara Jain temple ===
Shri Mahavira Digambara Jain temple is located in the Dewan's lane of Chickpet area (of the Bengaluru Pete) has an idol of Mahavira in the Kayotsarga posture. The temple constructed in 1878 has undergone many renovations and even now is under renovation. But the entrance arch to the temple is intact (pictured). The idols of Parshva, Bahubali, Vimalanatha, Anantanatha and Brahma Yaksha are seen in this temple. A guesthouse for pilgrims, Mahavira Bhavan, Ahimsa Derasar (House of non-violence) and a well equipped library containing the books on Jainism are part of the temple complex.

=== Shri Adinath Digambar Jain temple ===
Shri Adinath Digambar Jain temple is a new temple built in Jayanagar, a suburb of Bangalore. The construction of this temple started in the early part of this decade and was completed in 2007. The temple is built in white marble with colourful shades. The entrance gate is a nicely sculpted. Two white marble elephants are at the foot steps of stairs to reach the main temple (pictured - Sri Rajasthan Jain Śvetāmbara Murtipujaka Sangha and not the Shri Adinath Digambar Jain temple). Well-known Śvetāmbara derasars are located in Gandhinagar and Sajjan Rao Circle, and Jaya Nagar in Bangalore.

=== Shri Parshwa Sushil Dham ===
Shri Parshwa Sushil Dham is a Jain Temple built near National Highway 7. It is carved with white marble. Here, the mulnayak, or the main God is "Shankeshwar Parshwanath" and a Dadavadi of "Sushil Suriji" Marasaheb. Idols of Ghantakarna Mahaveer, Padmavati Mata, Nakoda Bhairav are also present here. This tirth has Dharamshala and Bhojanshala, as well as a playground.

== Sikhism and Gurudwara ==
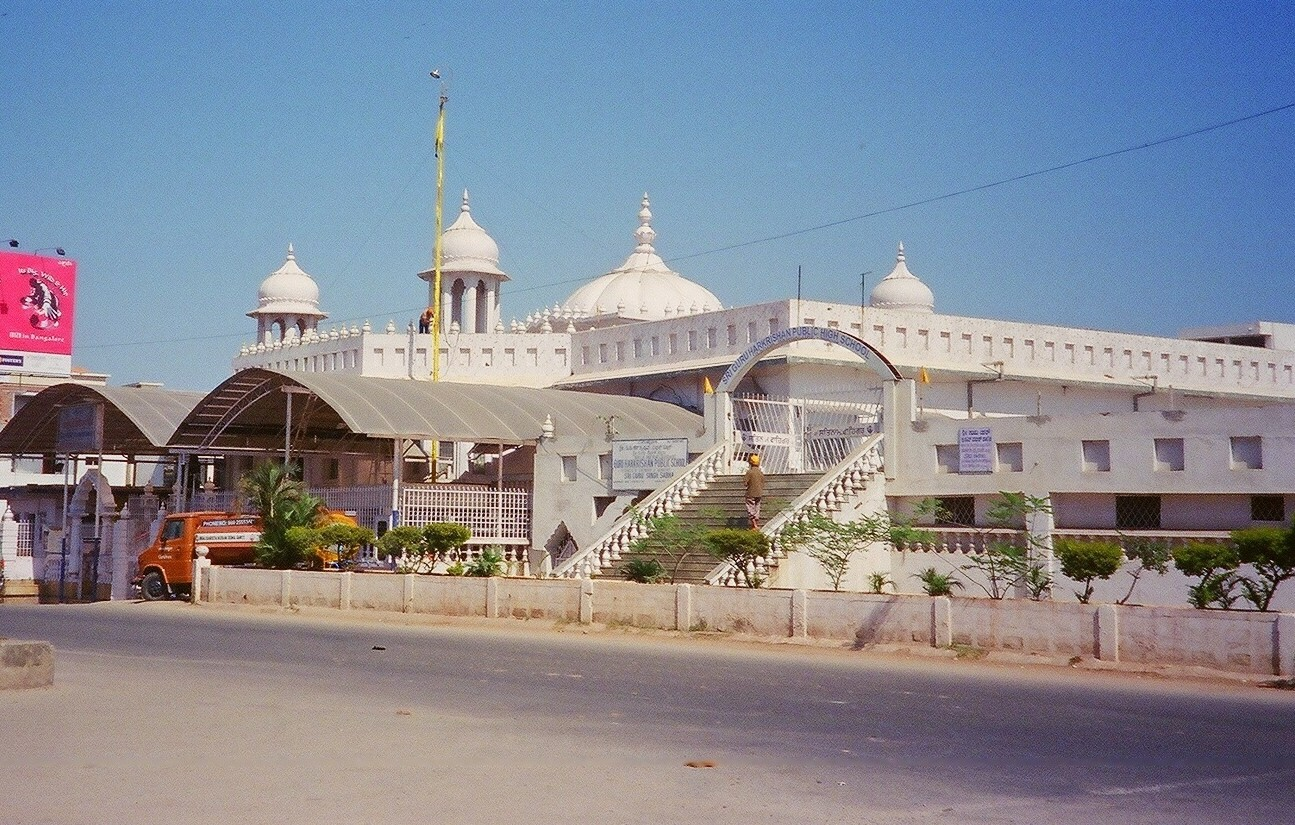
Gurudwara on the bank of Ulsoor lake in Bangalore

Guru Nanak, the Sikh guru, was the first Sikh to visit Bengaluru. On his way back from Sri Lanka he halted at Bangalore. Kempegowda met him and sought his blessings. Gurunanak not only blessed Kempegowda but also told him to develop the place. But it took many more years for a Sikh Gurudwara to be built in Bangalore. There are now three Gurudwaras in Bangalore. The first Sikh Gurudwara and the largest in Bangalore near the Ulsoor Lake on the Kensington Road, is an elegant and white structure (pictured), which was opened on 13 April 1946. It has been renovated recently with marble floors. The large prayer hall accommodates about 500 devotees at a time. Special prayers are offered every Sunday. The temple wears a colourful look as special prayers are offered and more than a thousand people from all religions come here to worship. The Sri Guru Singh Sabha which manages the Gurudwara also runs a school, a medical centre and a function hall also provides accommodation (a day's stay) to the tourists.

== Buddhism and Viharas ==
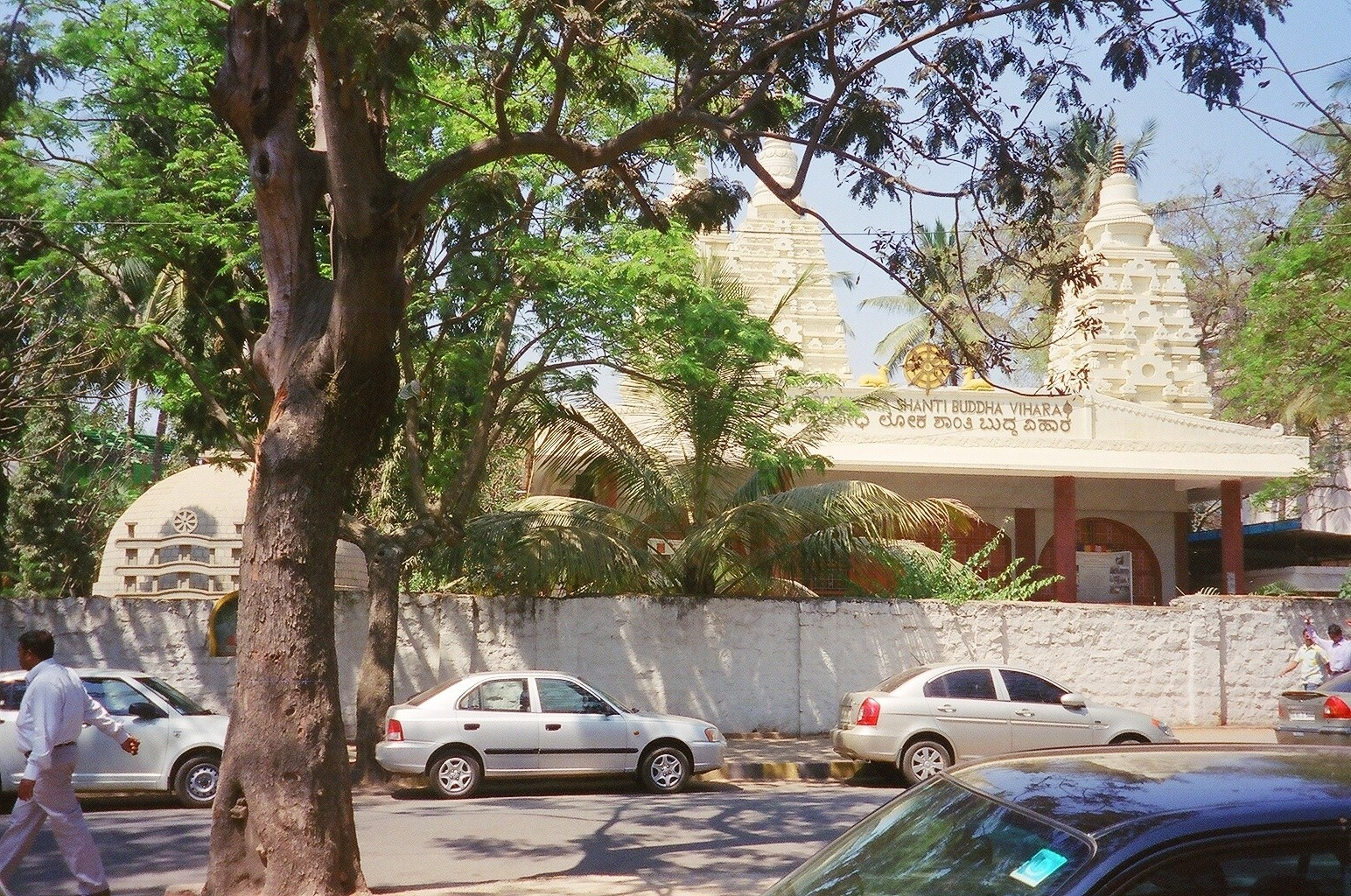
A view of Buddha Vihar in Bangalore

While under the Mauryas and Satavahanas Buddhism prospered in Karnataka, the influence of Hinduism expanded as it subsumed most of the teachings of Buddha and Buddhism and thus Buddhism lost its distinct uniqueness in the state. However, in the 20th century, Buddha viharas have been established in the State with many monasteries coming up in the state. Bengaluru has many centres of Buddha dharma today as there is a revived interest in the Buddhist approach that combines logical thinking and spirituality.

The Maha Bodhi Society (MBS) was established by Acharya Buddharakkhita in 1956 at Bangalore with the objective of propagating the teachings of the Buddha and to provide the inspiration and facilities for putting that teaching into practice through spiritual, social, educational activities. The first act of the Acharya was to plant a sapling of the holy Bodhi Tree from Bodh Gaya at the premises of the proposed Society. This tree has grown with the Society and is venerated. The Maha Bodhi Society Temple, a relatively new structure, was then built with the main shrine replicating the historic tower at Bodh Gaya. Temple as built is a brick structure with a central tower of 55 m (180.4 ft) height. The Stupa that represents a basic factor in the teaching of the Buddha has also been built at the entrance to the Temple which is made of granite and it enshrines a relic of the Buddha. The temple, the stupa and the Bodhi tree in the temple complex now form a unique landmark in Bangalore. It is a place of worship and meditation, a center of pilgrimage for people from all over India and other countries.

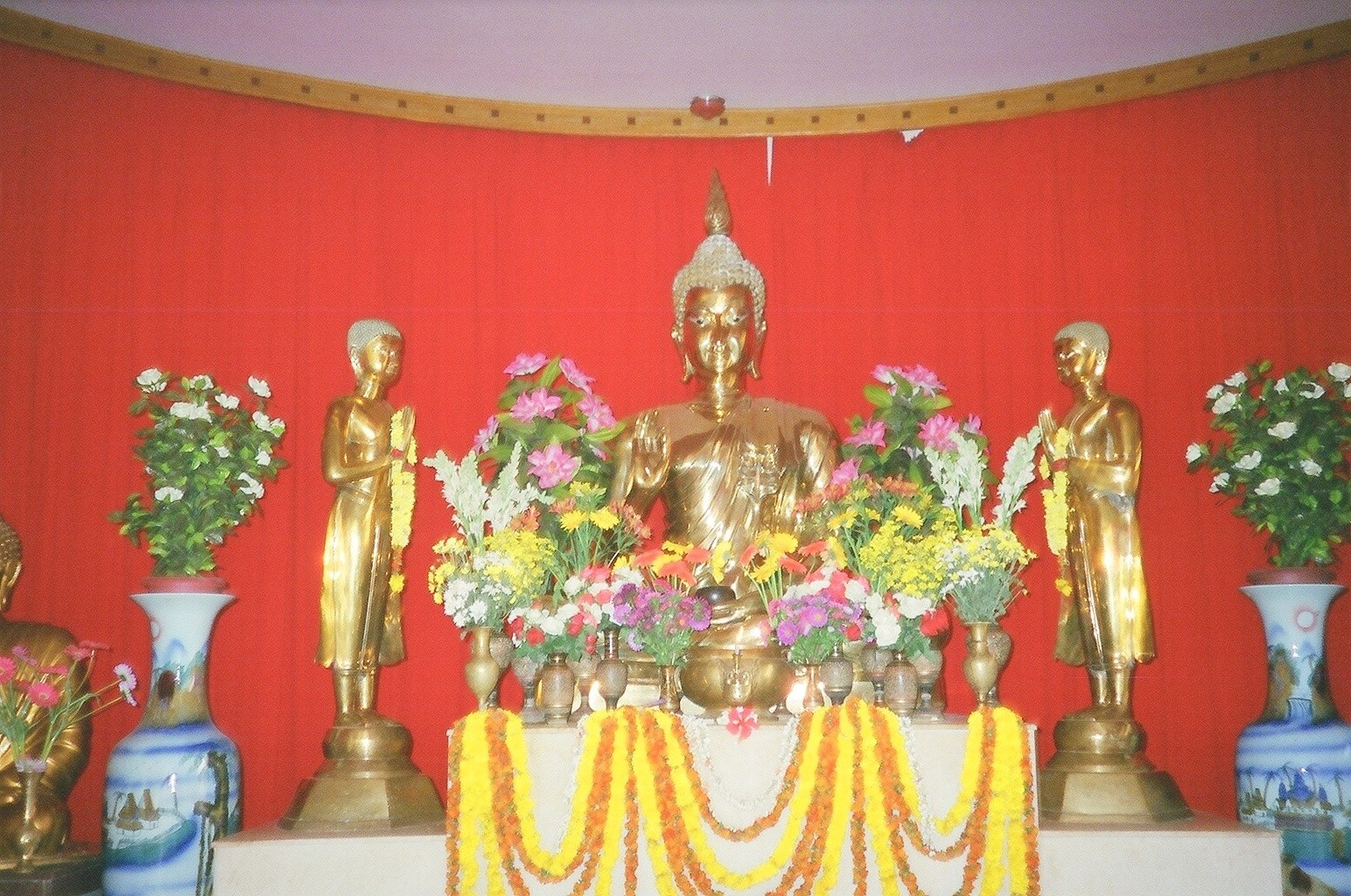
Buddha idols inside the Vihar

Choe Khor Sum Ling Centre, located in Domlur Layout, is a centre for the study and practice of Tibetan Mahayana tradition of Buddhism. This centre was set up in 2003 at the initiative of Dalai Lama by Lama Zopa Rinpoche. The name of the center means 'The Three Turnings of the Wheel of Dharma'. Buddhist meditation techniques and teachings on the various aspects of the ‘Graduated Path to Enlightenment' are taught here. In addition to regular teachings, every few weeks the centre also invites senior Lamas to give talks on important aspects of the Buddhist path, which are followed by instructions into different meditation practices. Ahimsamaya, a magazine devoted to vast heritage of the Pragya Paramita Buddhist tradition of Indian thinking in philosophy and spirituality is also brought out by the centre.

Thubten Lekshey Ling is a Nyingma Buddhist Study and Meditation Centre established in 2008. Nyingma Buddhism is the ancient school of Indo-Tibetan Buddhism that preserved and nourished all aspects of Buddhism as it existed in the period of great universities of India like Nalanda, Vikramashila, etc. Nyingma corresponds to the original transmission of Buddhism from India to Tibet in the 8th Century, the pinnacle of the golden era of Buddhism in India, by Guru Padmasambhava, Acharya Shantarakshita, Mahapandita Vimalamitra and many other great scholars and yogis. In this form of Buddhism rational study, mystical practices and non-conceptual meditation are equally emphasized. Mahayana and Vajrayana practices are emphasized in this tradition. Dzogchen (Mahasandhi-yoga) is its uniqueness. Thubten Lekshey Ling was founded by Penor Rinpoche. Thubten Lekshey Ling conducts teachings, meditation programs and advanced study groups in every weekend.

== Zoroastrians (Parsis) and Agiari ==
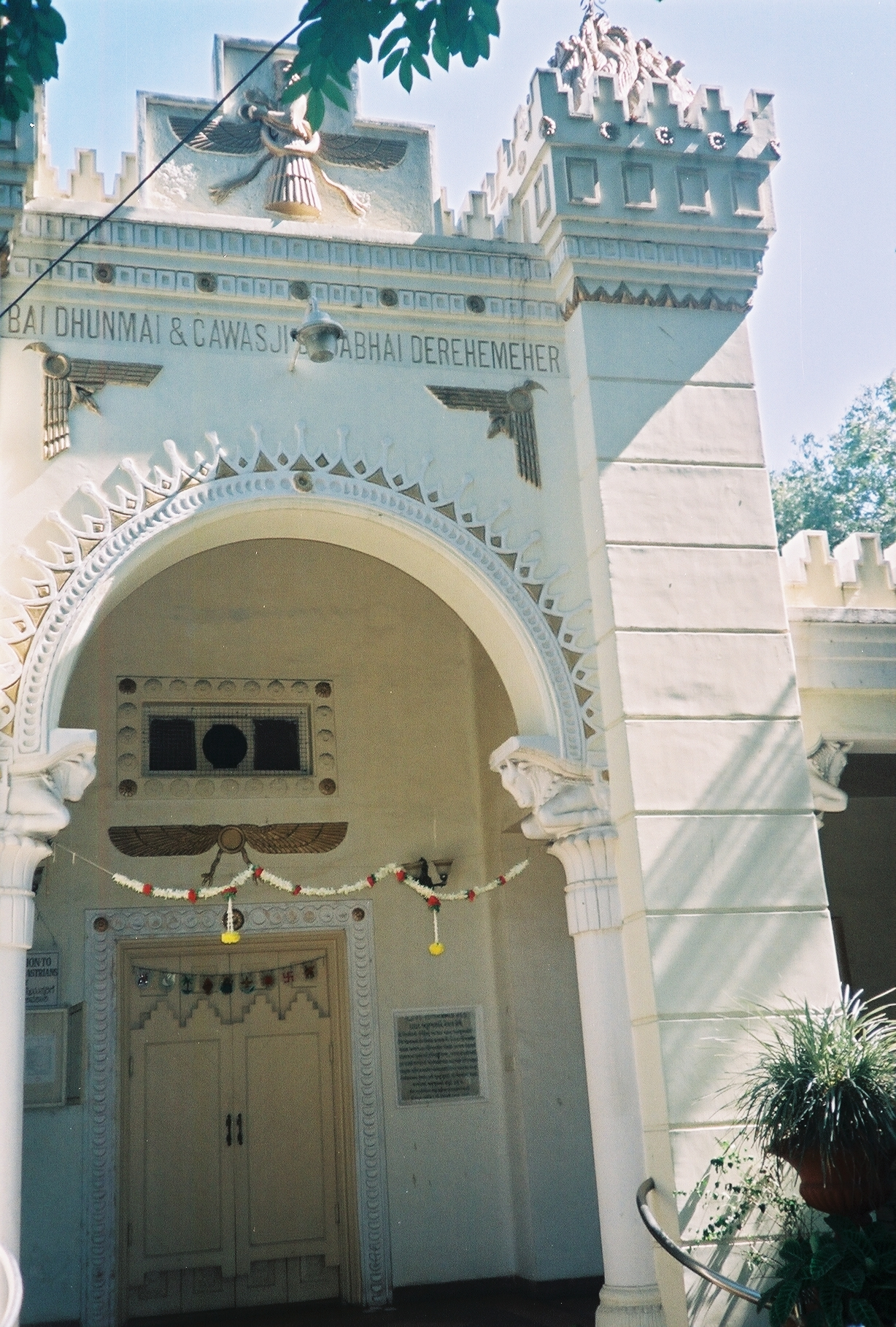
Parsi fire temple Agiari in Bengaluru

Zoroastrianism was founded by the prophet Spitama Zarathustra. The religion asserts that there is one god, Ahura Mazda (Wise Lord), other gods being manifestations of his qualities. The people who practiced Zoroastrianism and who fled from south-west Iran to India (initially came to the west coast of India and subsequently moved to other parts of India) due to persecution by Muslims in 642 AD (when the last Iranian empire was conquered by the Arabs) are called Parsis. The only possession they had when they came to India was nothing more than the sacred fire from their temple. Under British rule they prospered immensely. It is estimated that there are 130,000 Zoroastrians in the world; majority of them, about 100,000 live in India. They have retained their distinct identity and have contributed richly to India's progress in all sectors of development. The members of the community emerged as successful businessmen, lawyers, and doctors and have worked largely in the service sector. In the early 20th century retired bankers, accountants and businessmen moved from west coast and established themselves in Bangalore, as in those days, Bangalore was considered a retirement paradise. The early settlers to Bangalore built the fire temple on Queen's Road in 1926 with the help of Dinshaw Cawasji, a contractor from Mumbai and called it the 'Baidhanmai and Cawasji Dadabhai Dar-E-Meher', which caters to the small group of Parsis, about 700, residing in the city. An eternal fire burns in the inner sanctum fed by sandalwood, as the symbol of the life cycle and eternal recurrence. The temple has carvings of bulls on its many pillars. Only the priests are allowed to enter the sanctum sanctorum where the eternal fire burns. A Parsi is one who is born into the religion since Zoroastrianism is a non–proselytising religion. Their Holy Book is known as the Kordeh Avesta along with the Vendidad, lists prayers and prescribes tenets to be followed. The Bangalore Parsi Zoroastrian Association (BPZA) and the Bangalore Zoroastrian Anjuman (BZA) hold regular meetings to discuss the issues concerning the community.(also refer external link)

== Baháʼí Faith ==
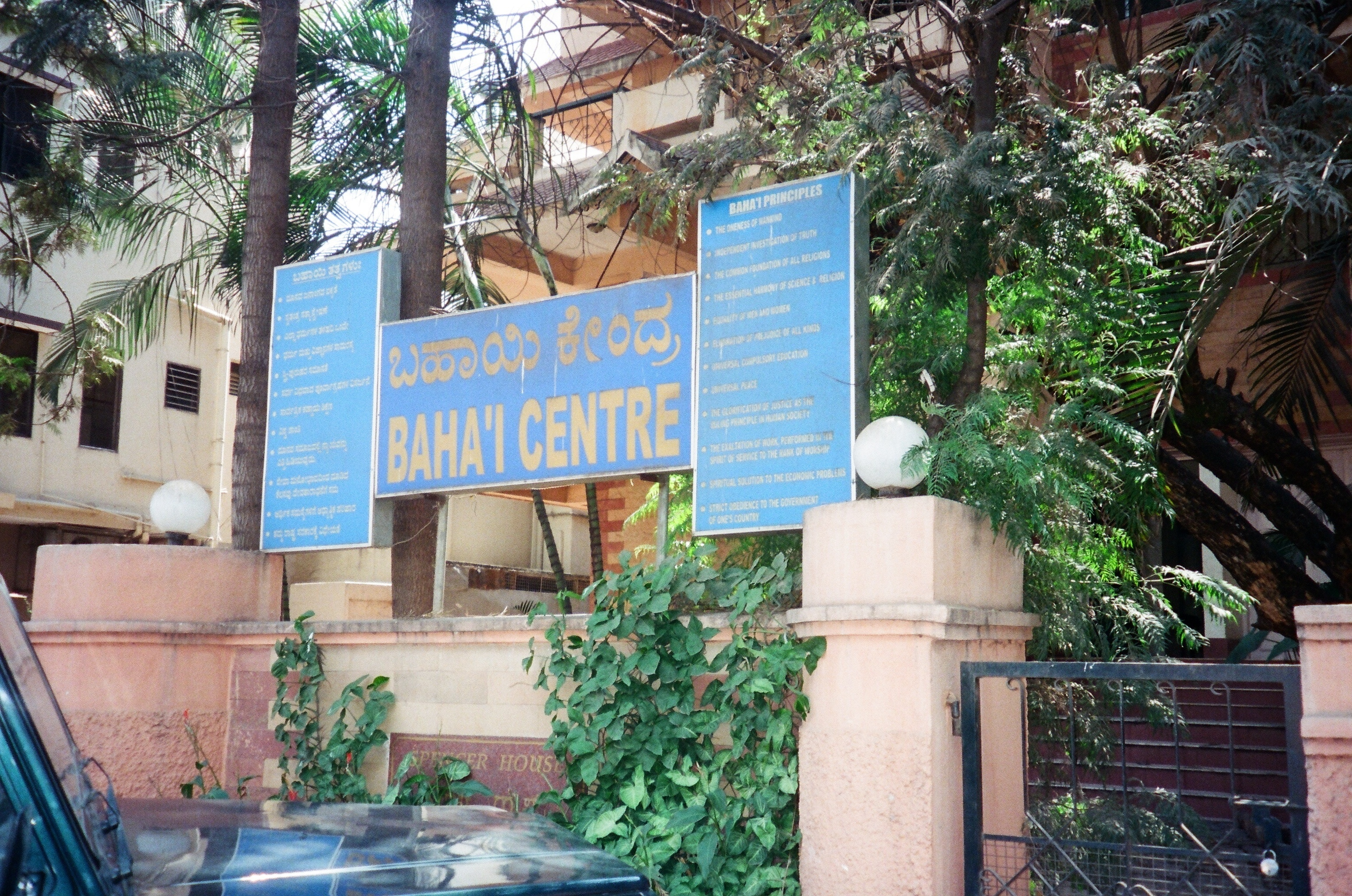
Baháʼí Centre, Bengaluru

The Baháʼí Faith, a monotheistic religion that recognizes the religious canons of other religions, was founded by Bahá'u'lláh to spread his message around the world that "The earth is but one country and mankind its citizens." It has its members in nearly every nation, ethnic group, culture, profession, and social or economic background. Its reach is stated to cover four million people in 166 independent countries and 48 territories. Finding a unifying vision of the nature and purpose of life and of the future of society is the main goal of all Baháʼís. Such a vision is also propagated by the Baháʼí Centre at Bangalore, which is the administrative headquarters and secretariat of all Baháʼí activities in Karnataka state. This centre (pictured) holds small group discussions on the teachings of Baháʼí Faith almost every day, apart from prayer meetings.

== Jews and the Chabad ==
The Jewish presence in Bengaluru has been traced to a house dating to at least the early 20th century, called the Ruben House, on the main Old Guard road near Safina Plaza, where a mezuzah is displayed (a small case containing the Shema, a passage from the Bible handwritten on a piece of parchment, that expresses the basic precept of Jewish faith). It belongs to the Rubin Moses family, the only family out of the five families traced to pre–independence time who still live in Bangalore; the other four families have migrated. Ezer Weizman, the former president of Israel (from 1993–2000) visited this family in Bangalore in 1997 and reminisced of the old times when he had served in Bangalore during World War II in the British Royal Air Force. Apart from the Ruben house, two other Jewish homes traced in Bangalore are the Hazelmore house on the Palace road and the Eastern Lodge in the Cavalry road. Another piece of interesting information reported is that M. Benjamin author of the book The Mysteries of Israel's Ten Lost Tribes and the Legend of Jews in India is residing in Bangalore since 2001.

A cemetery on Mysore Road, also established at the beginning of the 20th century, by Subedar Major Samuel Moses Nagavkar, a Bene Israel Jew, at a site donated to him by the Maharaja of Mysore, is also a witness to the Jewish history in Bangalore.

In another part of the city in the European cemetery located on Hosur Road, two Jewish graves have been identified in the European Cemetery, one is of T M. Horvitz, (b. Australia in Runoleff, d. Bangalore on 20 June 1898) with a headstone of granite stone, engraved in Hebrew language and the other is of Rose Hickey (d. on 9 February 1917, aged 48 years).

As of 2012, the Jewish community (mostly belonging to the Information Technology (IT) sector) living and visiting Bangalore, though a small group, has established a Chabad in Bangalore, as proposed by two visiting rabbinical students who had been traveling in different parts of India to be in contact with the Jews. The rabbis are members of a global organization called Chabad Lubavitch located in New York with representatives across the world. The Rabbi students are traveling across India equipped with religious paraphernalia such as Tefillin and Mezuzot to preach to the small community of Jews.

== Gallery ==
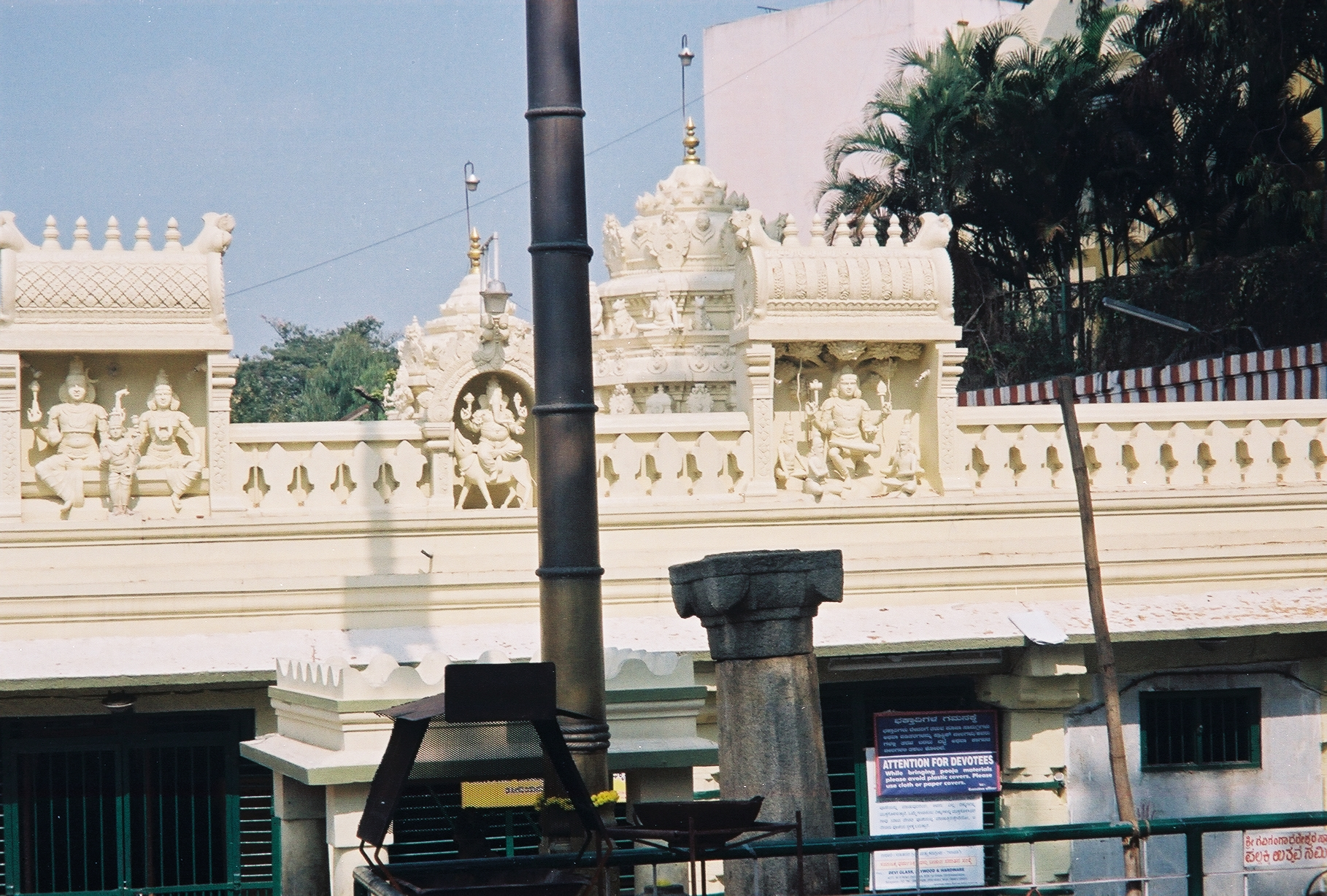
Frontage and towers of Gavigangadreshwara temple

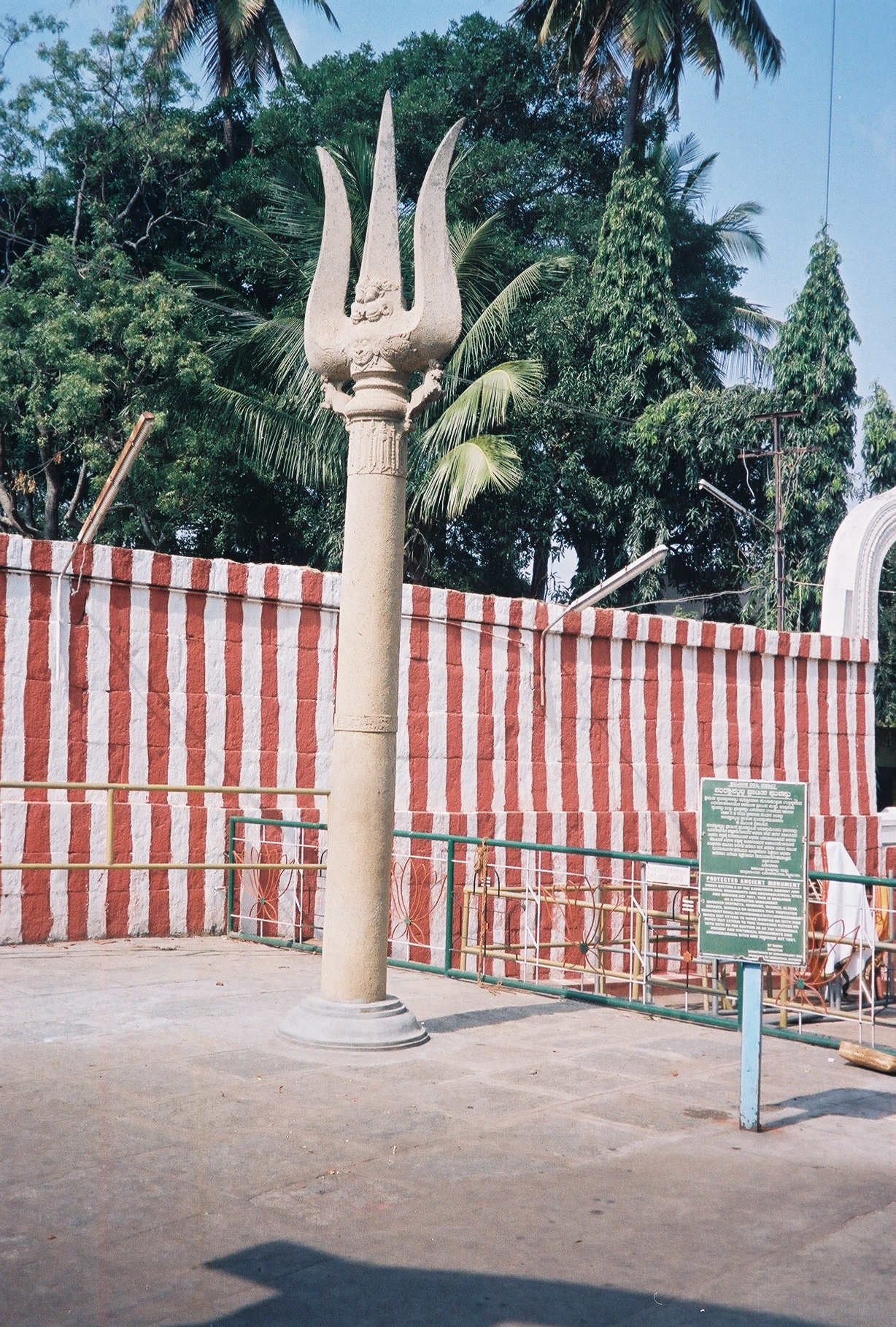
Trident outside the Gavigangadreshwara temple

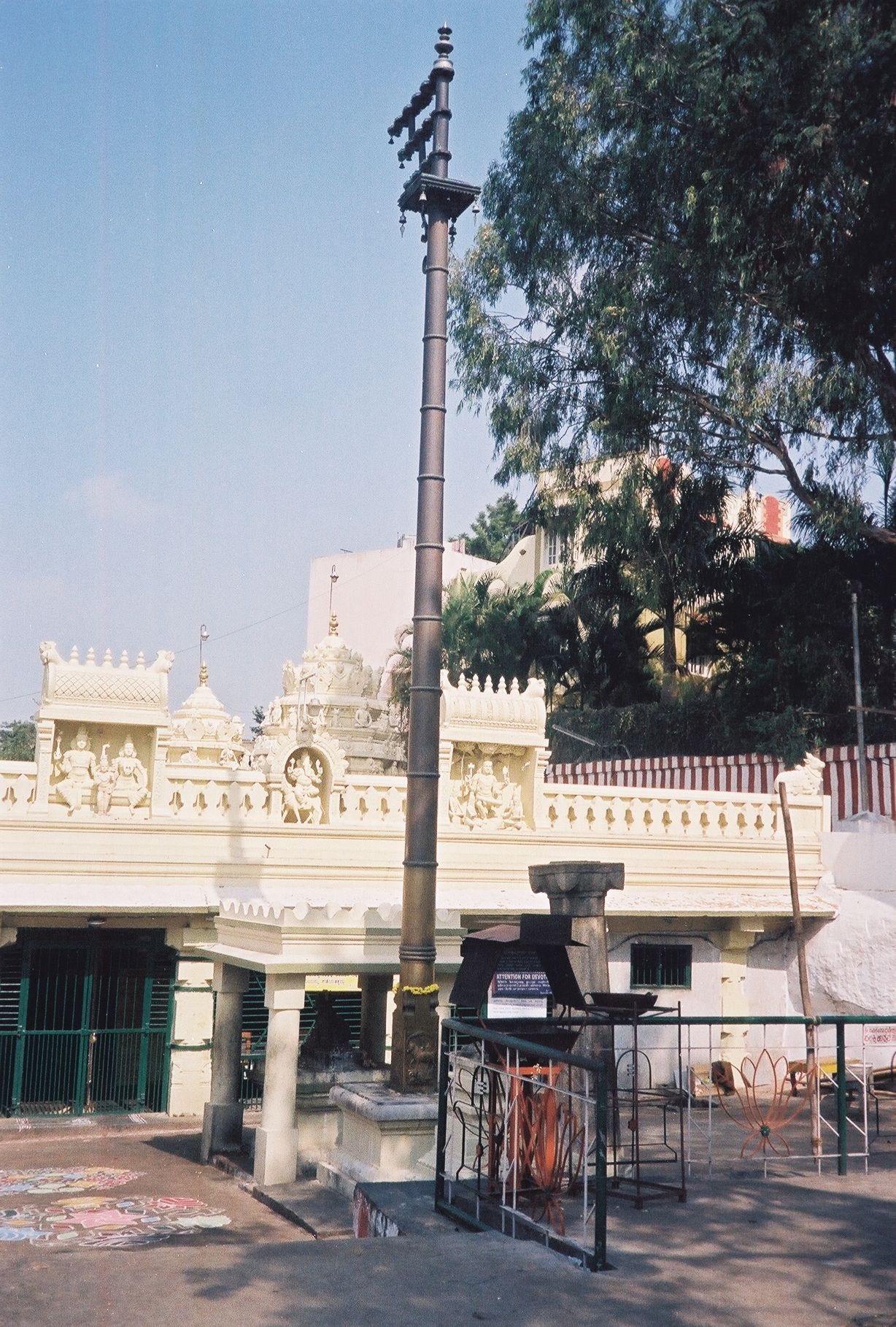
The bull and the Dwajasthamaba at the entrance to the Gavigangadreshwara temple

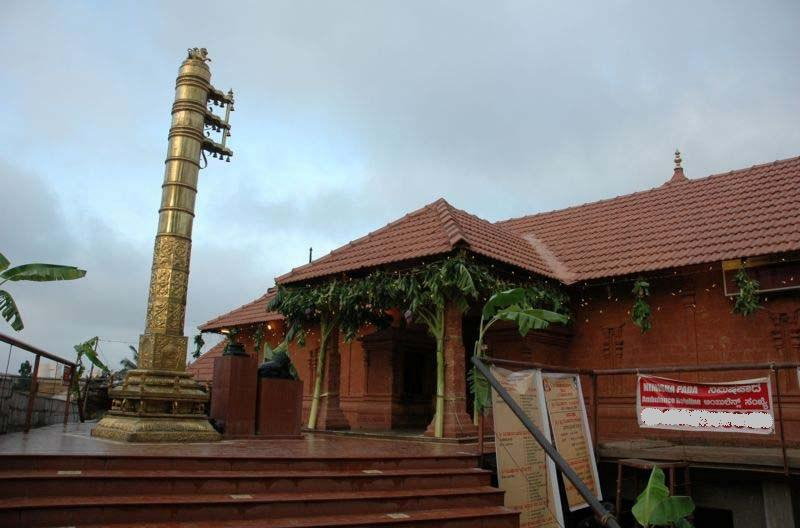
The tower and entrance of located at Rajarajeshwari Nagar

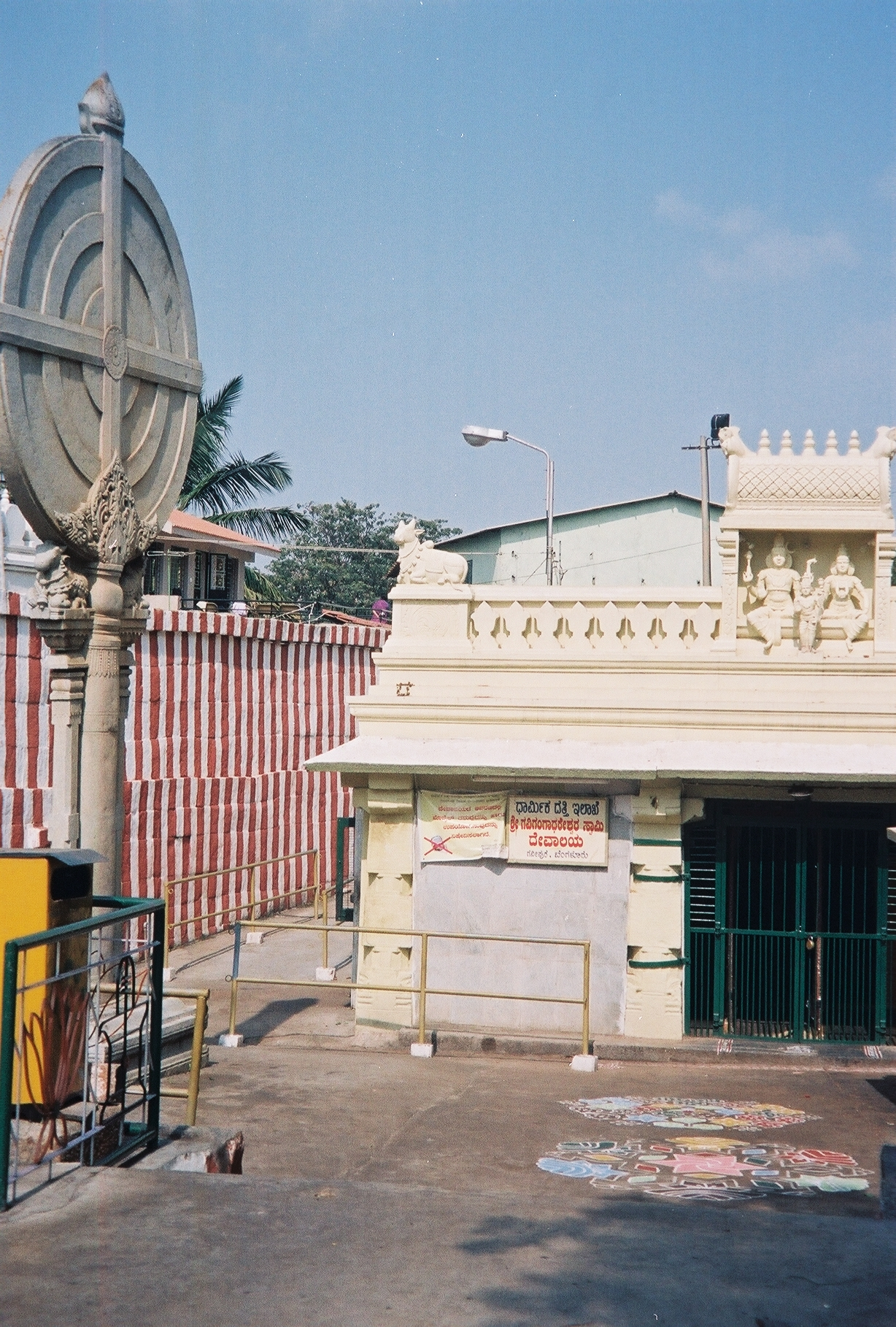
Suryapanka Outside Gavi Gangadareshwar Temple

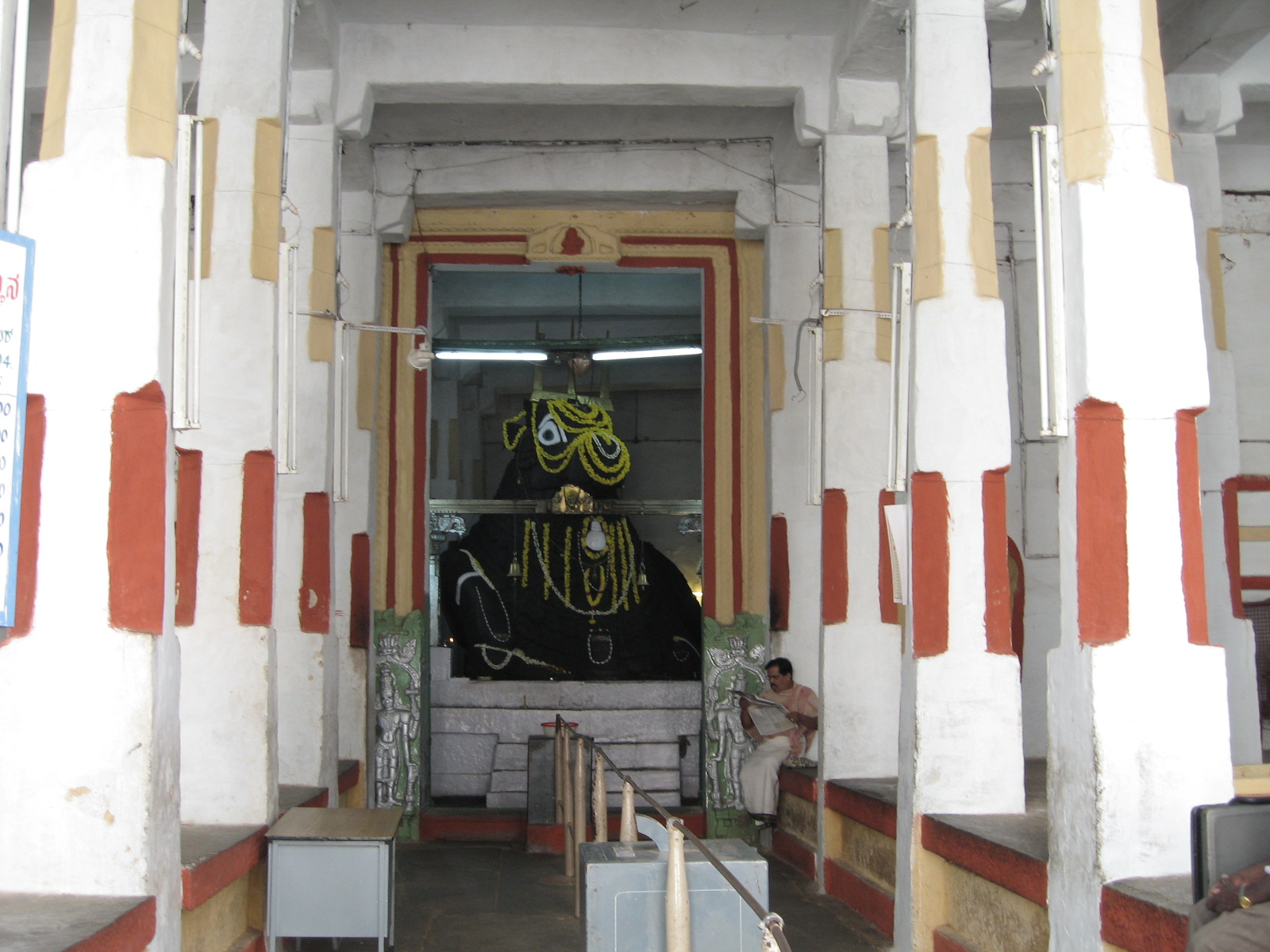
Temple interior with Nandi idol

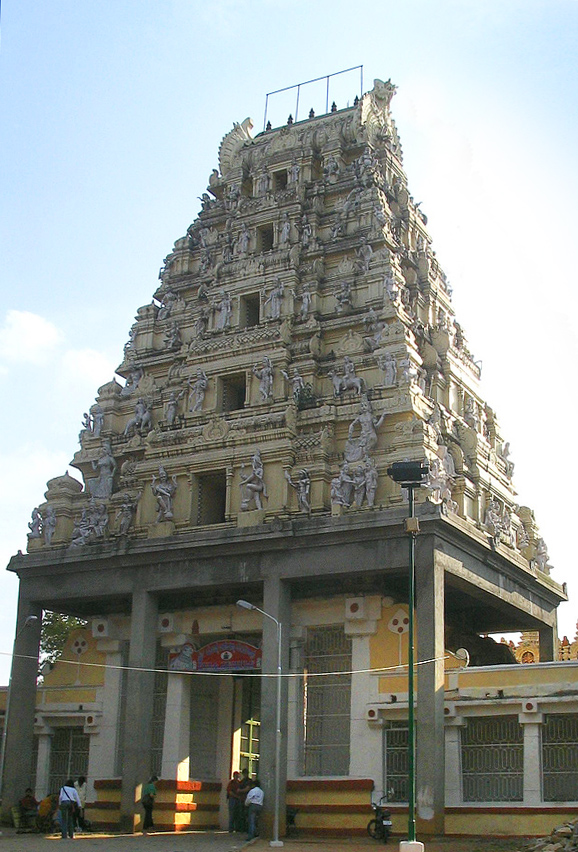
The Bull temple entrance

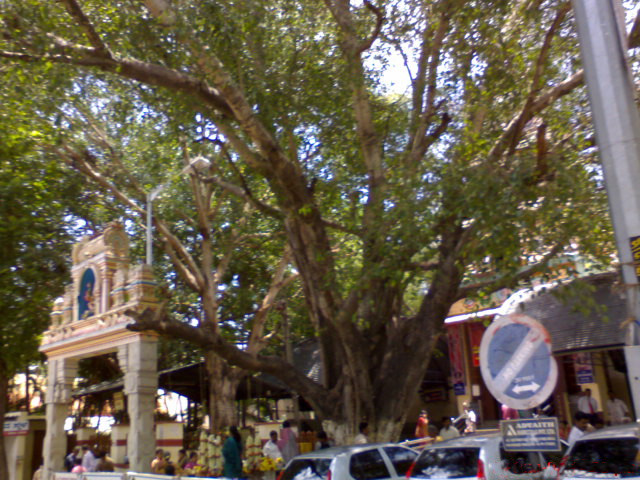
Doddaganesha temple entrance near Bull Temple

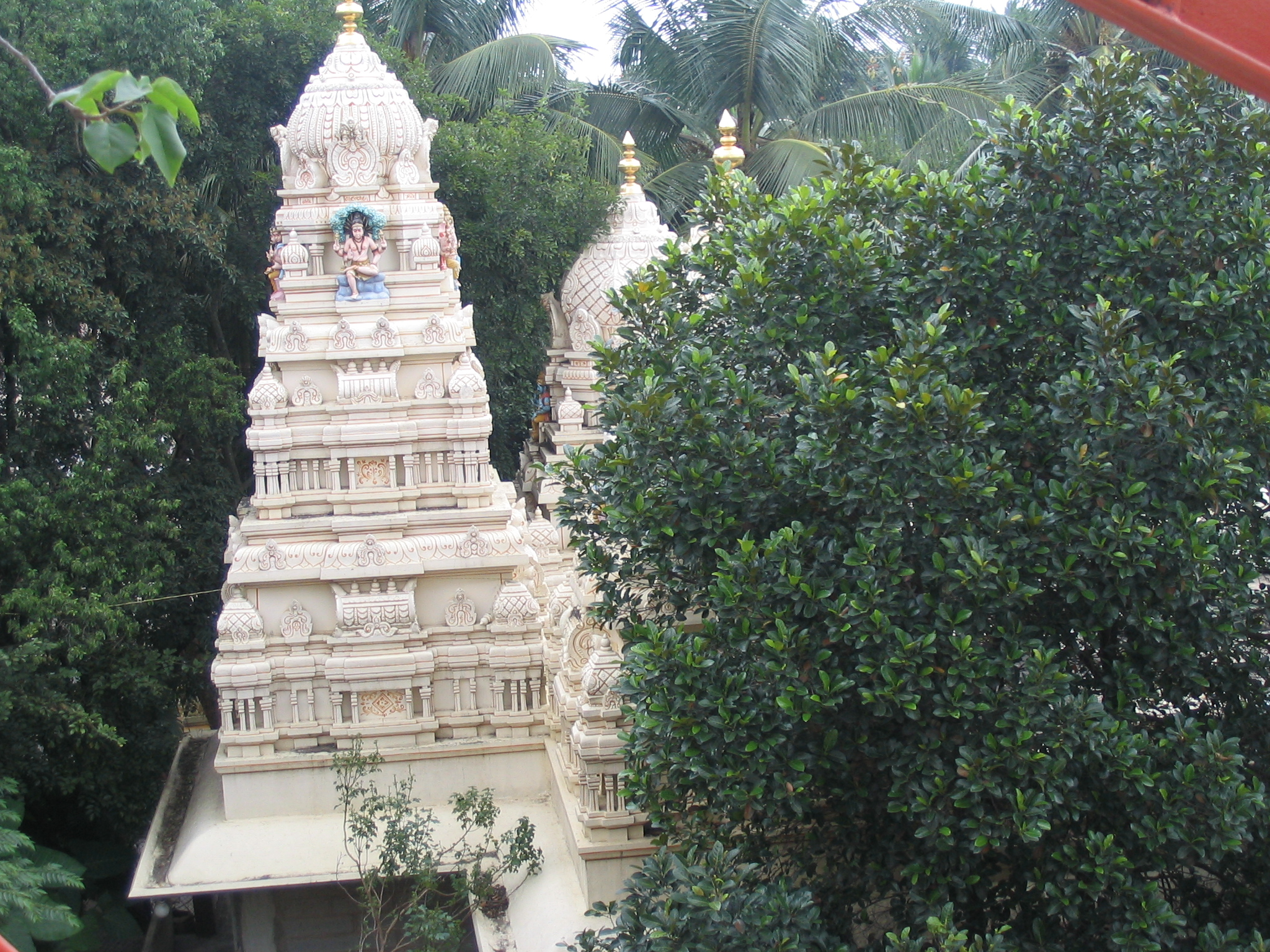
View of the Hanuman temple, popular as Ragigudda temple, in a suburb in Bengaluru

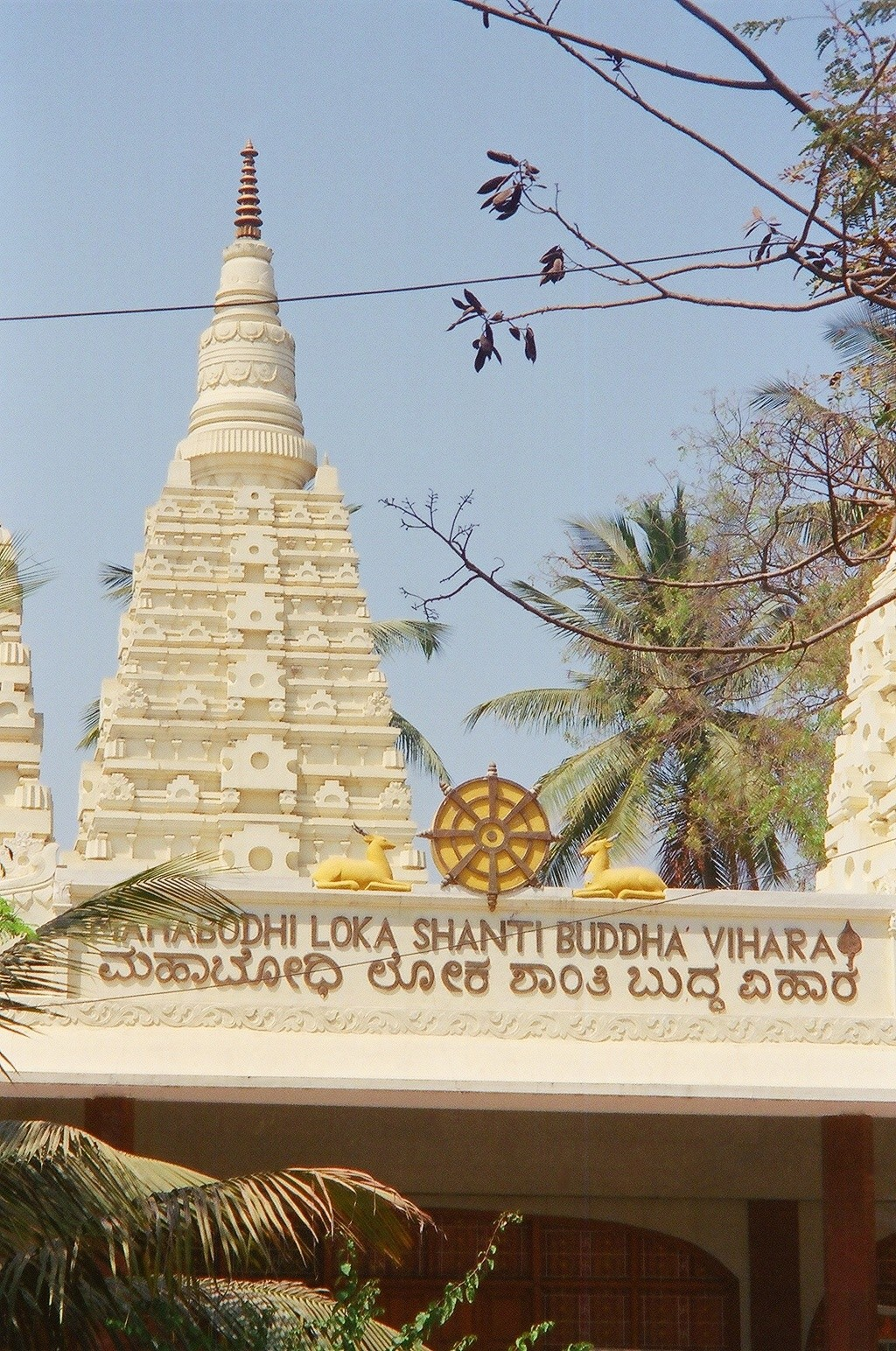
The Buddha Vihara tower, a replica of the tower at Bodh Gaya

The Stupa a replica of the Stupa at Bodh Gaya

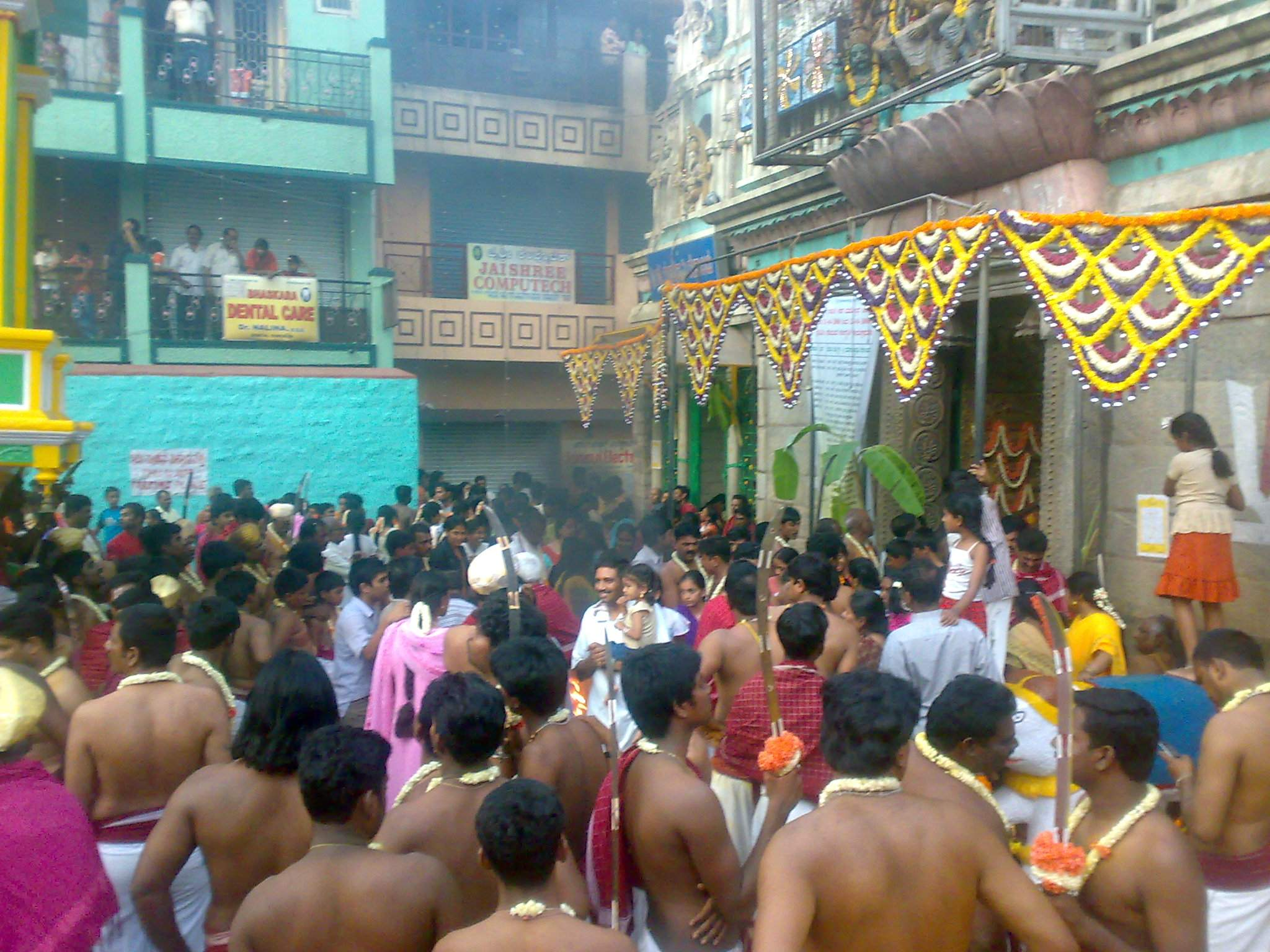
Thigala devotees celebrate Karaga- Hindus and Muslims take part in this festival with fervour

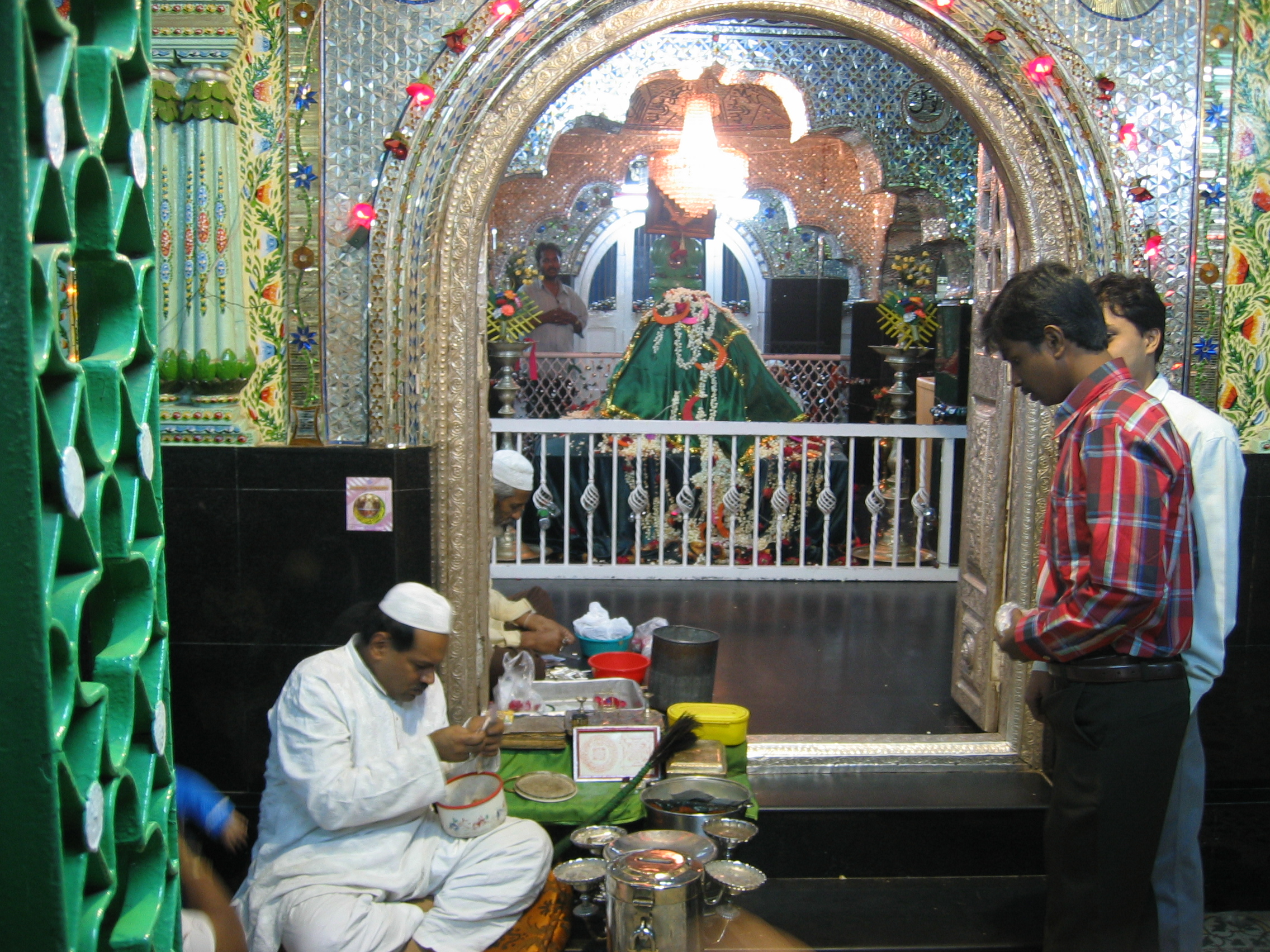
Inside the Tavakkal Mosque
