= Sri Pralayakala Veerabadrar temple =

Sri Pralayakala Veerabhadra temple, located in Gavipura, Guddadahallii, Bangalore, is a temple dedicated to the Hindu deity Pralayakala Veerabadra .
