= Bengaluru Central Business District =

Bengaluru Central Business District Bengaluru CBD Downtown Bengaluru
- Neighborhood
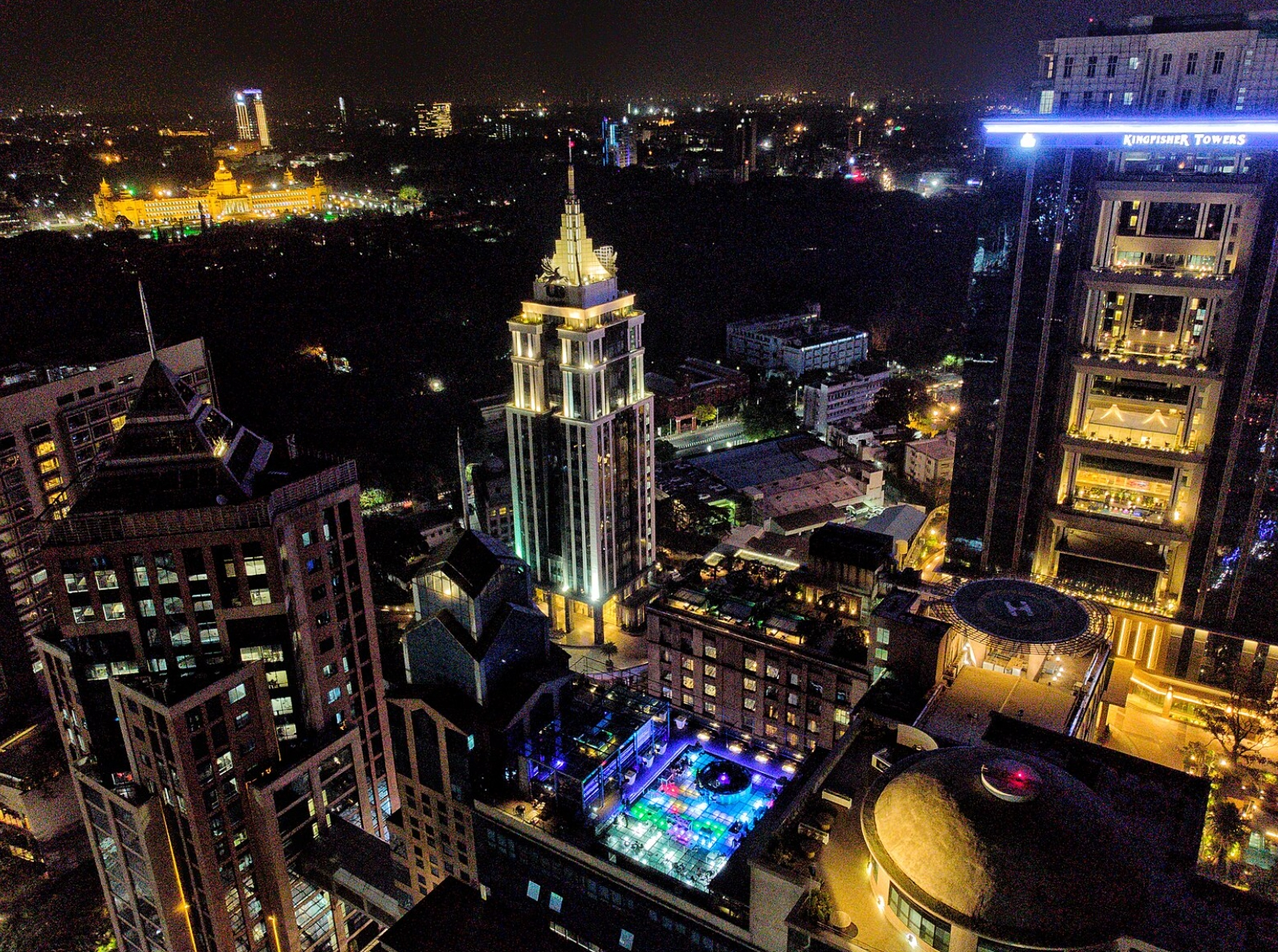
- The Night Skyline of Bengaluru Central Business District with the centrally located UB City in view and Vidhana Soudha, the seat of the Karnataka Legislature, lit in the background. The unlit space between them is the Cubbon Park (Sri Chamarajendra Park), one of the largest urban parks in India.

- Location in Bengaluru, India
- Coordinates: 12.975°N 77.61°E
- Country: India
- State: Karnataka
- District: Bengaluru Urban
- City: Bengaluru

Government
  - Type: Municipal Corporation
  - Body: Bengaluru Central City Corporation

Languages
  - Official: Kannada English
- Time zone: UTC+5:30 (IST)
- PIN: 560001 - Bengaluru GPO 560002 - Bengaluru City PO 560025 - Museum Road PO
- Vehicle registration: KA 01 - Bengaluru Central RTO

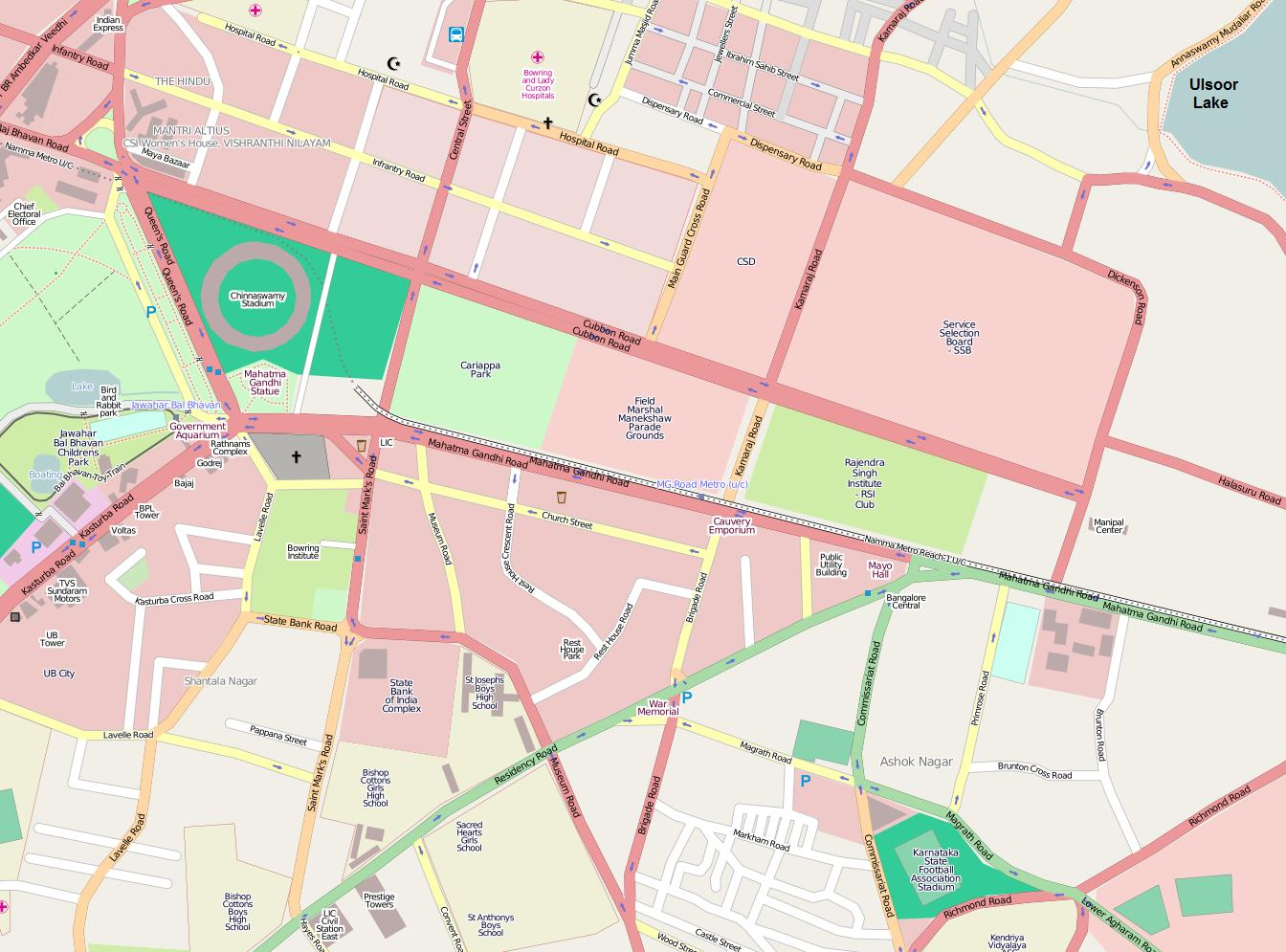
Bangalore CBD, MG Road is seen.

The central business district of Bengaluru is the area within a 7 km radius around Vidhan Soudha. This is the center of Bangalore and was founded by Kempegowda of the Vijayanagara Empire. Most of the land is used by commercial establishments and the Indian Army with plans of skyscrapers under works. It has multiple high-rises including UB Tower. It also includes heritage properties like the Bangalore Fort and the Bangalore Pete.

The Collection in UB City is one of the first luxury shopping malls of South India. The land in CBD is expensive; Brigade Road and MG Road are amongst the most expensive in India. It also houses many other high streets including Commercial Street and Church Street as well as the Karnataka Film Chamber of Commerce. CBD is a tourist attraction as there are parks, government offices, educational institutions, business houses and hotels, shopping destinations, stadiums, museums, temples, mosques, churches, art galleries and entertainment zones. Since the 2010s, planning and transport studies have described the area as part of a wider urban corridor accommodating service-sector activities, including technology and corporate services, in the context of Bengaluru’s metropolitan expansion. The planned extension of the Namma Metro network under Phase II, approved in 2017 and progressing into the early 2020s, enhanced connectivity along adjoining corridors and supported commercial and residential development near metro-linked districts.

== Notable roads ==
- MG Road
- Brigade Road
- Magrath Road
- Richmond Road
- Kasturba Road
- Commercial Street
- Church Street
- Lavelle Road
- Queens Road
- Cubbon Road
- Millers Road
- Cunningham Road
- Museum Road
- Kamaraj Road
- Nandidurga Road
- Infantry Road
- Dickenson Road
- Raj Bhavan Road
- St. Mark's Road
- Vittal Mallya Road
- Residency Road
- Convent Road
- Raja Ram Mohan Roy Road
- Hayes Road
- Central Street
- Palace Road
- St. John's Church Road
- Jumma Masjid Road
- Ali Asker Road
- Bowring Hospital Road
- Ulsoor Road
- Nrupathunga Road
- Dr. Ambedkar Road
- J C Road
- Seshadri Road
- Kempegowda Road (KG Road)
- Mosque Road
- Tannery Road
- Wheeler Road
- Kengal Hanumantaiah Double Road
- Mission Road

== Neighborhoods ==
The following are the neighborhoods either fully or partially located in the Central Business District

=== Northern Part ===
- Vasanth Nagar
- Frazer Town
- Cooke Town
- Cox Town
- Benson Town
- Jayamahal

=== Eastern Part ===
- Richmond Town
- Sampangiramanagar
- Langford Town
- Shantala Nagar
- Austin Town
- Vivek Nagar
- Agram
- Sivanacheti Gardens
- Ulsoor

=== Western Part ===
- Gandhinagar
- Seshadripuram
- Binnypete

=== Southern Part ===
- Chickpet
- Chamarajpet
- Kalasipalyam
- Wilson Garden
- Adugodi

== Important landmarks ==
Vidhana Soudha in Bangalore CBD is the legislature seat of Karnataka

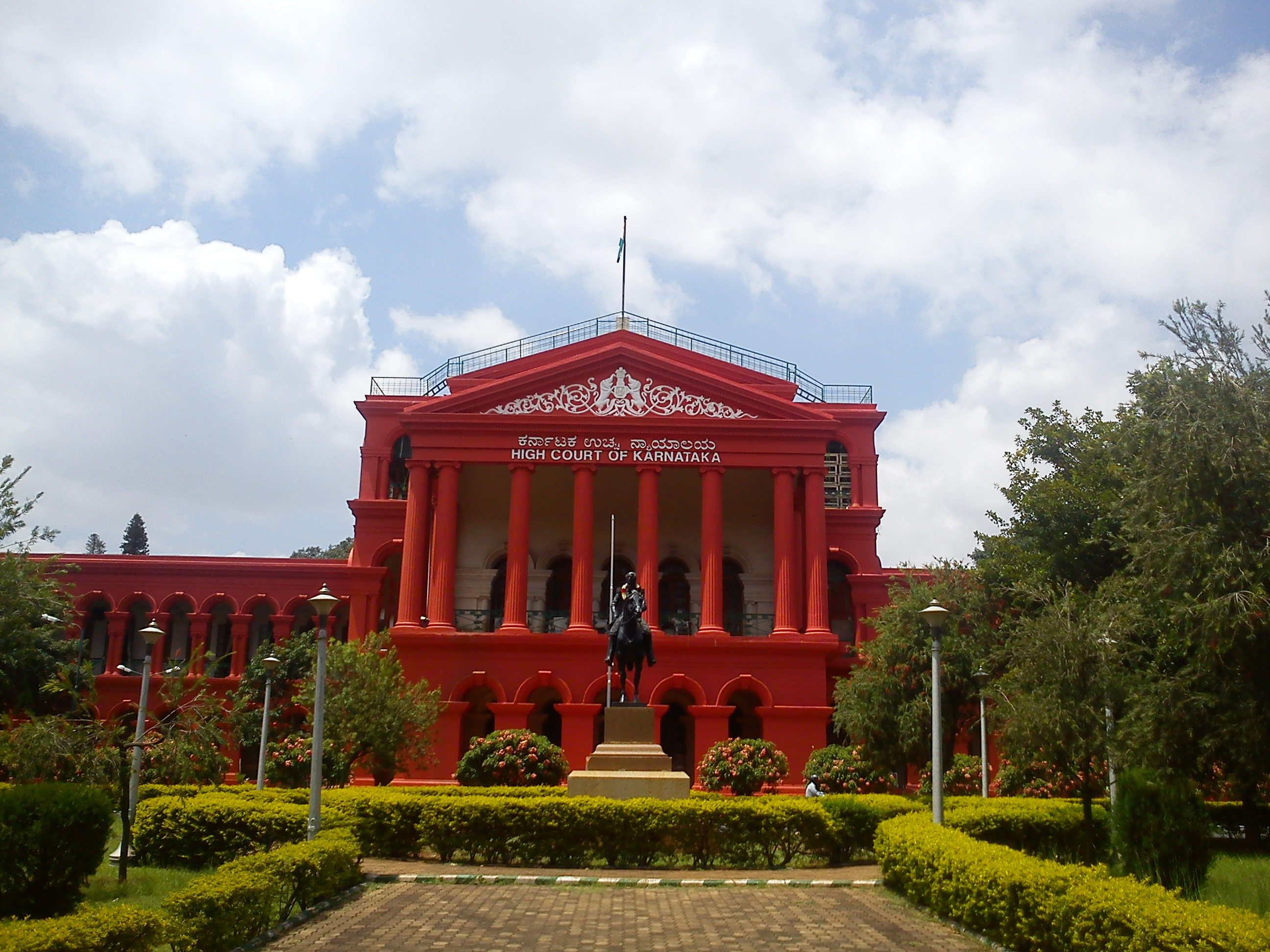
Karnataka High Court

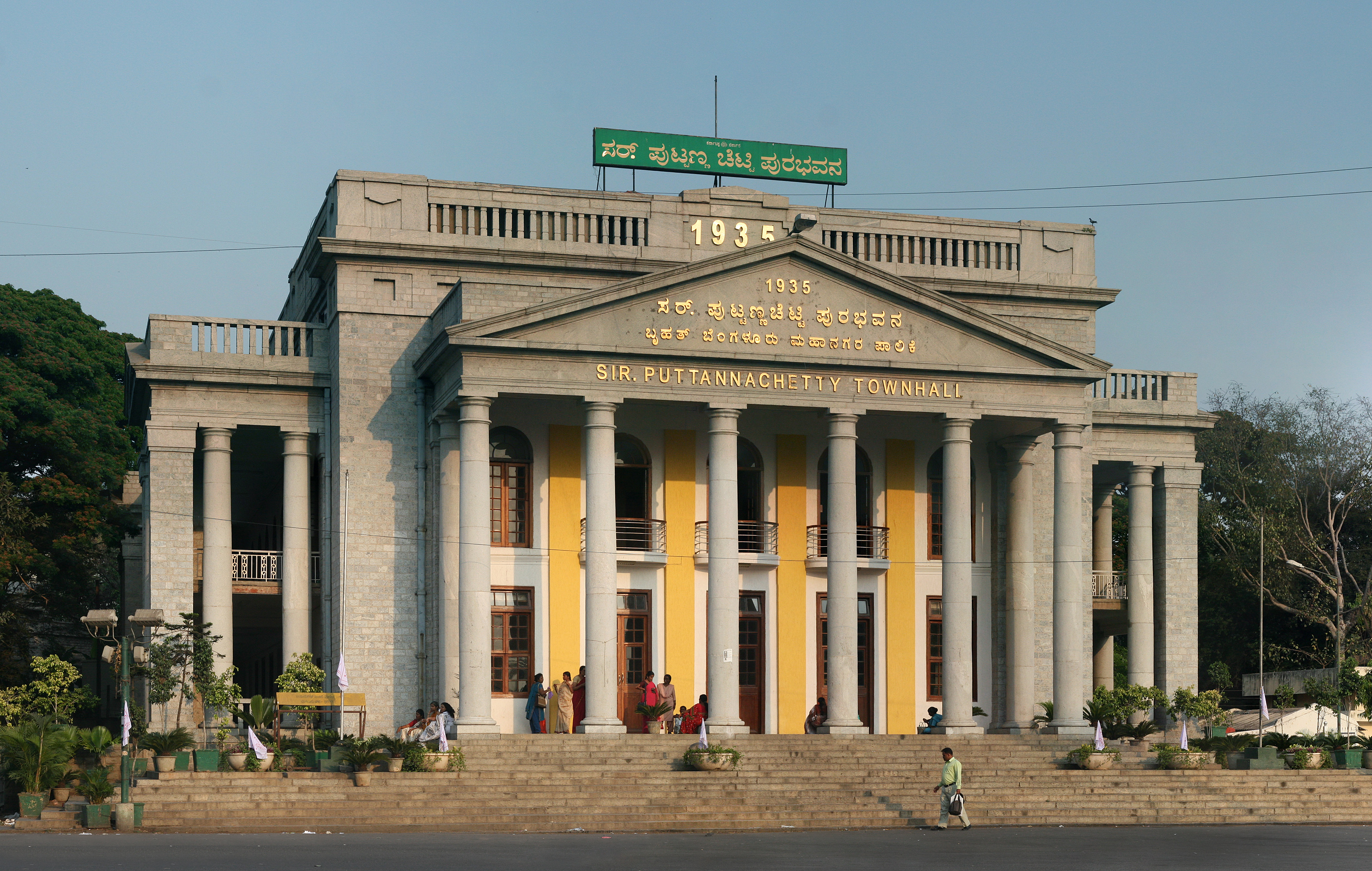
Town Hall

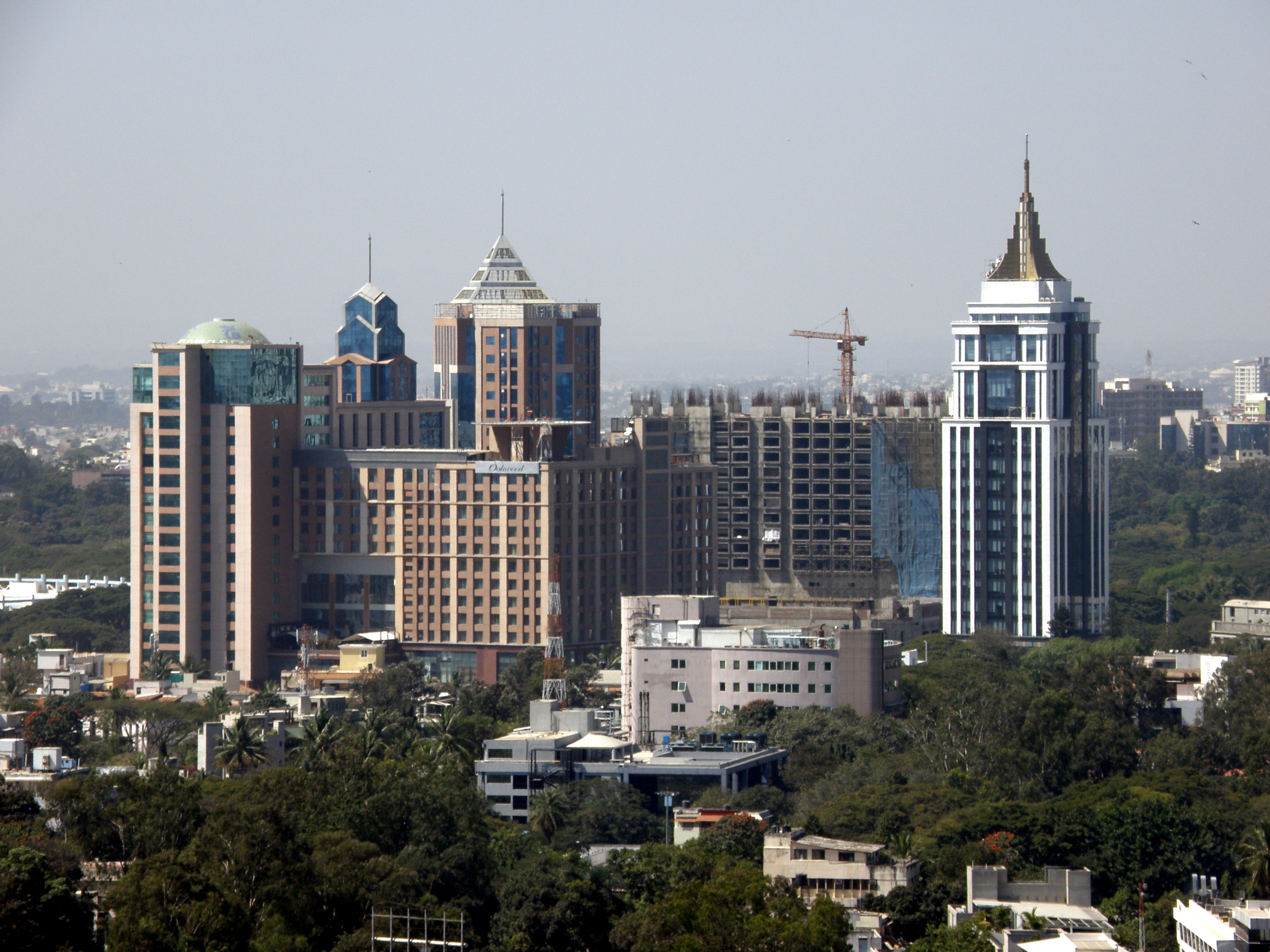
UB City

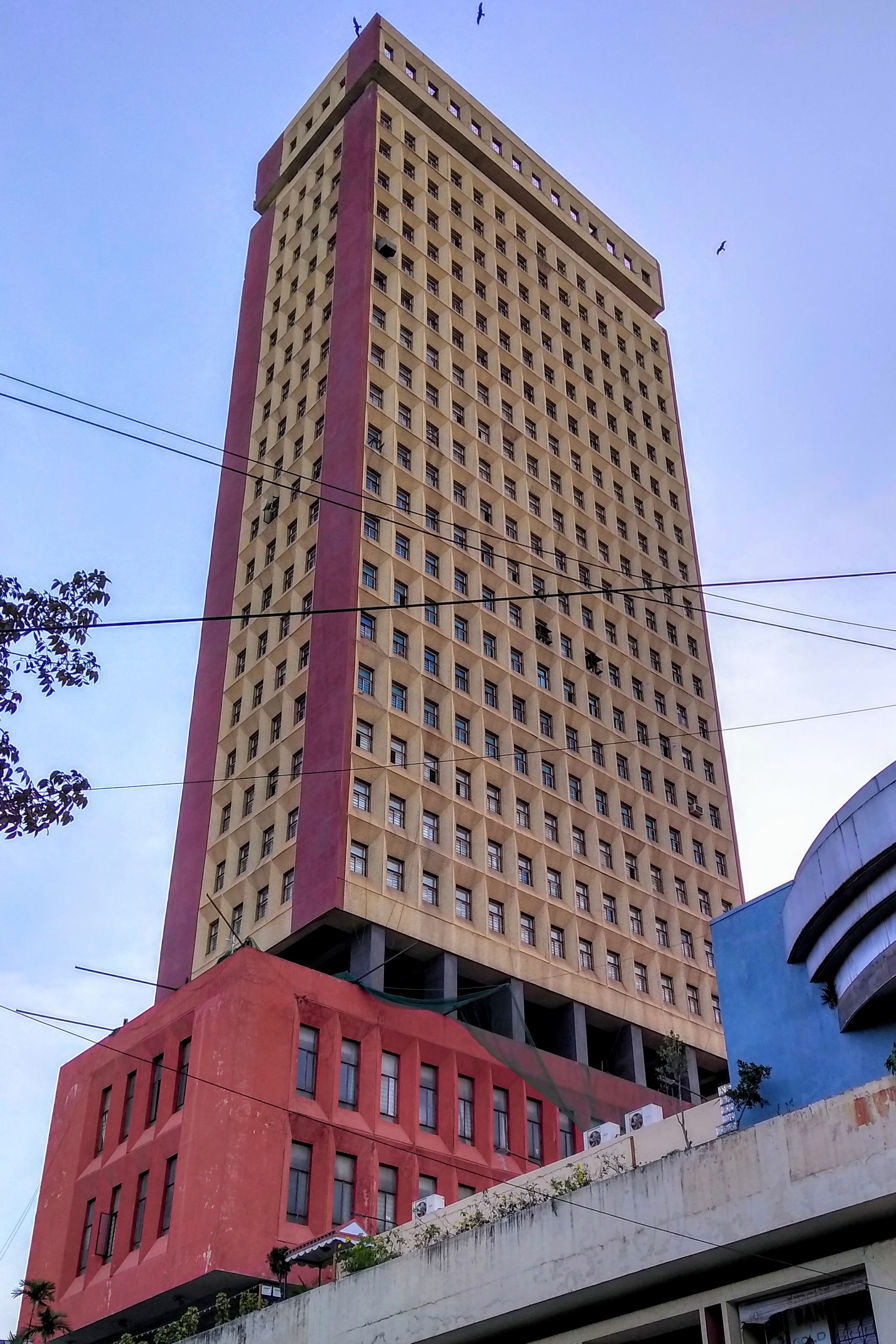
Public Utility Building

Sree Kanteerava Stadium

- Vidhana Soudha (State legislature of Karnataka)
- Freedom Park
- National Gallery of Modern Art
- Department of Industries and Commerce
- National Bank For Agriculture And Rural Development
- State Bank of India - International Branch
- Jawaharlal Nehru Planetarium
- Karnataka Power Transmission Corporation
- India Meteorological Department
- Hindustan Aeronautics Limited Corporate Office
- General Thimmayya National Academy Of Adventure
- Raj Bhavan Karnataka
- Madras Sappers
- Board of Technical Examinations
- Department of Archaeology and Museums
- Karnataka State Central Library
- Reserve Bank of India
- Bangalore Palace
- Lal Bagh Botanical Gardens
- Bangalore Fort
- Vikasa Soudha
- Commissionerate of Social Welfare Department
- UB City
- Department of Information and Public Relations
- Central Revenue Building
- Parachute Regiment - Indian Army
- Karnataka and Kerala Sub Area HQ of Army
- Kempegowda Majestic Metro Station (the largest station in Asia)
- Cubbon Park
- Press Club of Bengaluru
- Karnataka Government Museum
- General Cariappa Memorial Park
- India Post General Post Office
- Indira Gandhi Musical Fountain Park
- Karnataka Chitrakala Parishath
- Bangalore Turf Club
- Ulsoor Lake
- Russel Market
- Bangalore Club
- Bangalore Cantonment railway station
- Bangalore City railway station
- Venkatappa Art Gallery
- Bangalore Police Headquarters
- Central Press Information Bureau, Bangalore
- Traffic Headquarters
- St. Mary's Basilica
- Bangalore Town Hall
- Bowring Institute
- Karnataka Housing Board
- BESCOM Corporate Office
- BWSSB Corporate Office
- State Youth And Sports Centre
- Karnataka Institute of Cricket
- Century Club
- Karnataka Examinations Authority
- Home Guards & Civil Defence Academy
- Bangalore Hockey Stadium
- Kanteerava Indoor Stadium
- M. Chinnaswamy Stadium
- Bangalore Football Stadium
- High Court of Karnataka
- Manekshaw Parade Grounds
- Atal Bihari Vajpayee TTMC
- Canara Bank Head Office
- Bangalore East railway station
- National Games Village
- Mysore Bank Circle
- St. Francis Xavier's Cathedral
- Dodda Basavana Gudi
- East Parade Church
- State Bank of India Local Head Office
- Krishi Bhavan
- Bank of Baroda International Branch (formerly Head Office of Vijaya Bank)
- Ashoka Pillar
- Mahatma Gandhi Road metro station
- Gavi Gangadhareshwara Temple
- Binny Mills
- Lulu Mall
- Life Insurance Corporation Jeevan Prakash Building
- Coles Park
- Mount Carmel College
- Bangalore Stock Exchange
- Sri Guru Singh Sabha Gurudwara, Halasuru
- Sri Sathya Sai Institute of Higher Medical Sciences, Whitefield

== Tallest buildings ==
Rank	Name	Image	Height	Floors	Year	Use
1	UB Tower	UB Tower	123 m (404 ft)	20	2008	Commercial
2	Kingfisher Tower		122 m (400 ft)	34	2018	Residential
3	Concorde Tower		115 m (377 ft)	20	2008	Commercial
4	Prestige Trade Tower		115 m (377 ft)	27	2017	Commercial
5	Public Utility Building		106 m (348 ft)	25	1973	Commercial
6	Canberra Tower		105 m (344 ft)	20	2008	

=== Under construction or planned ===
Rank	Name	Height	Floors	Year
1	Bengaluru Turf Tower	660 m (2,170 ft)	156	Cancelled
2	Wearesf Towers	440 m (1,440 ft)	109	2015
3	KTRE ARFD Tower	400 m (1,300 ft)	90	2016
4	ASTA VIBRANT Towers	300 m (980 ft)	94	2012
3	Golden Empire	288 m (945 ft)	68	2018
3	Karnataka Financial Towers	245 m (804 ft)	57	2019

== Consulates ==
- Consulate-General of Japan
- Consulate-General of Israel
- Consulate-General of Germany
- Consulate-General of Switzerland
- Deputy High Commission and Trade Office of United Kingdom
- Consulate- General of France
- Consulate of United States of America (temporarily at JW Marriot)

== Gallery ==
Aerial views

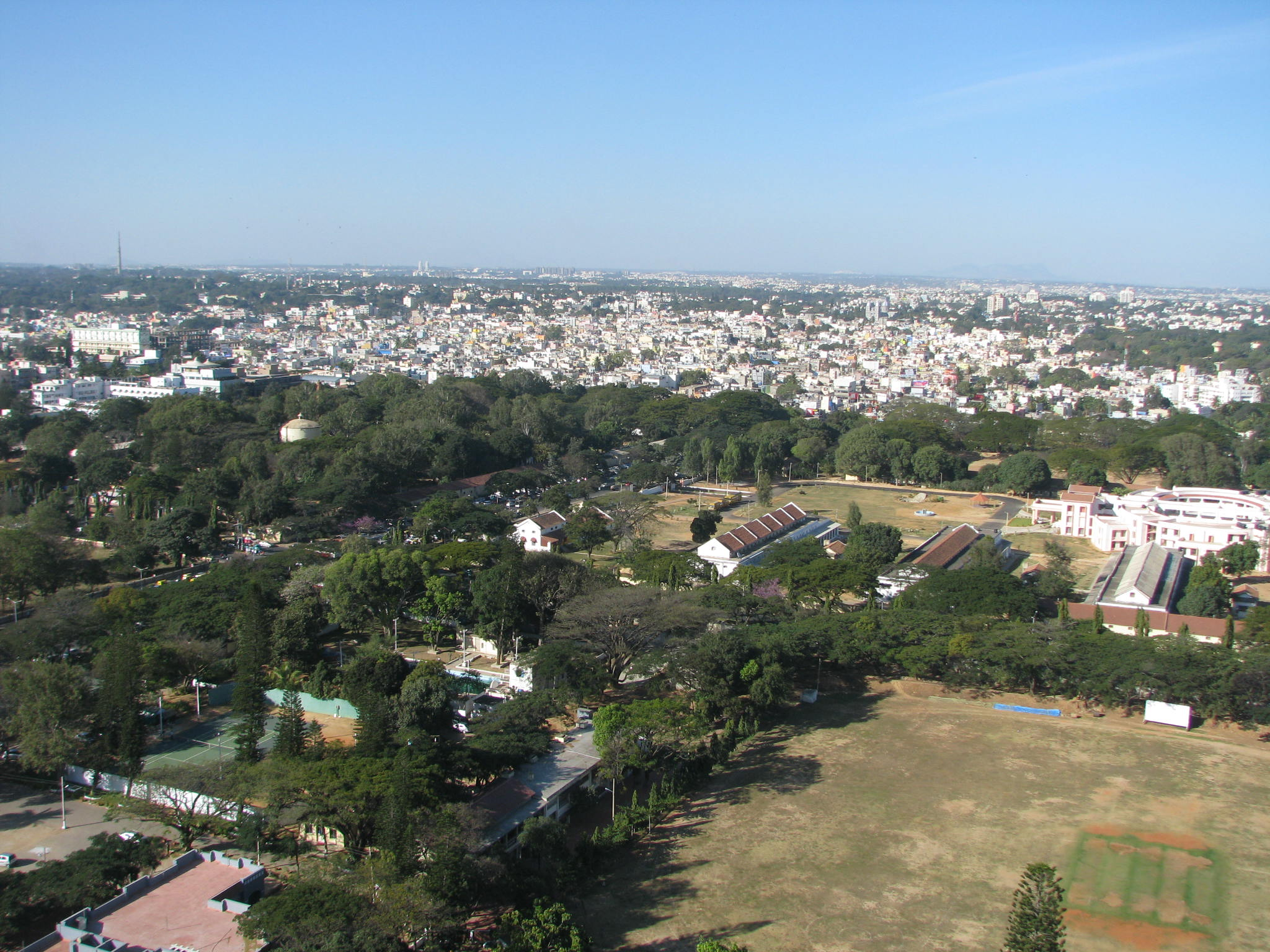
Aerial view from MG road Utility Building

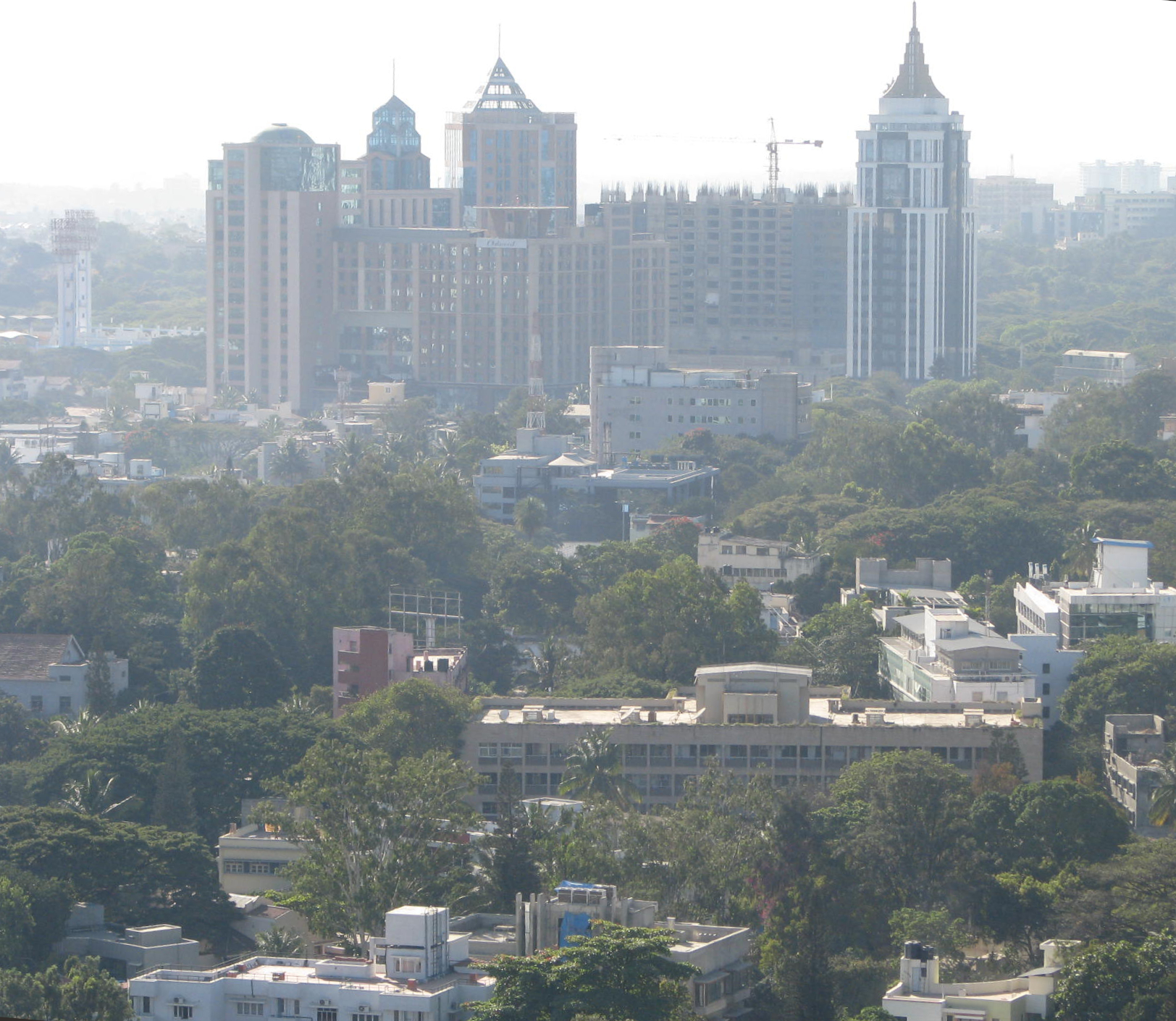
Aerial view from MG road Utility Building

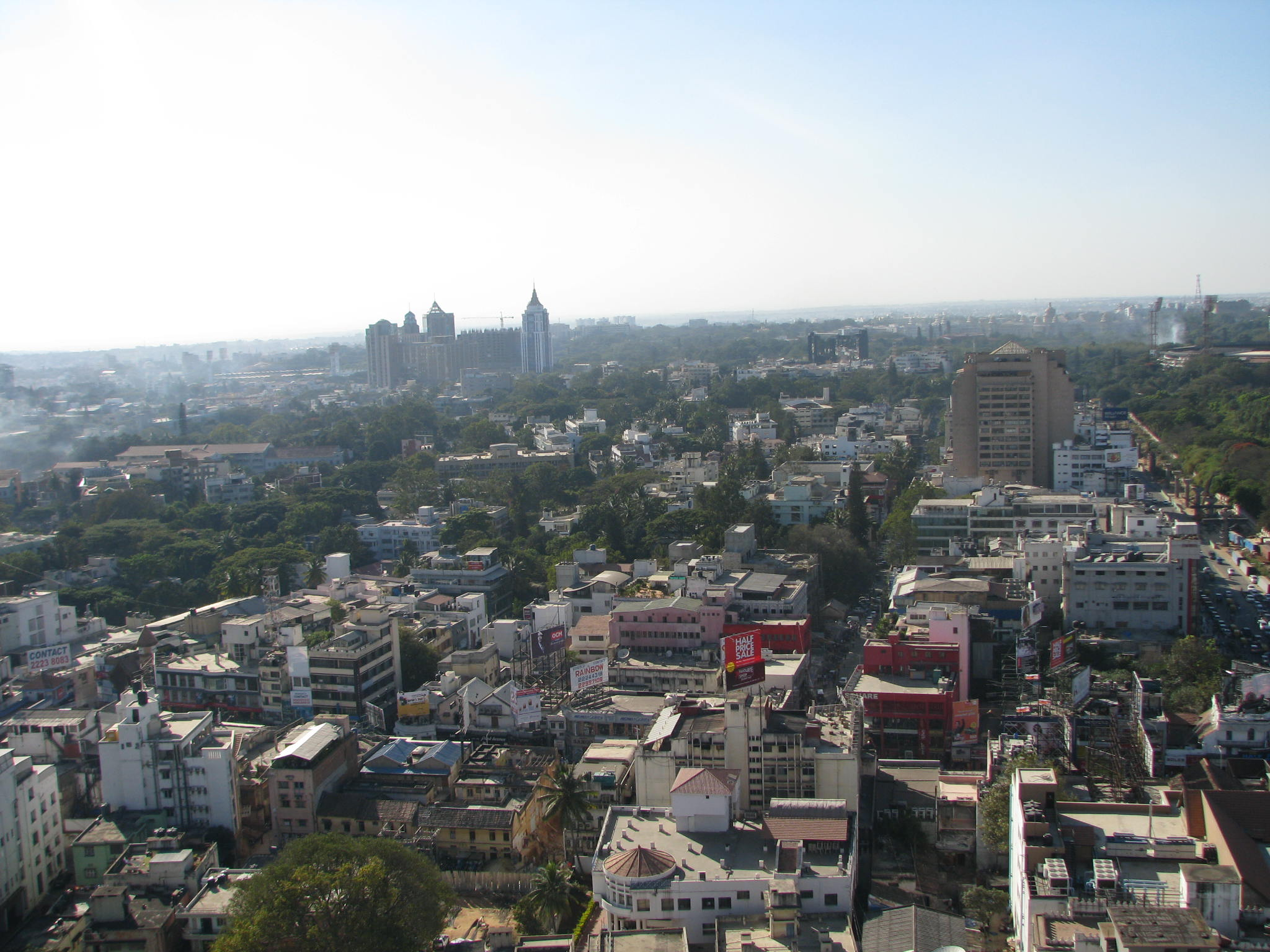
Aerial view from MG road Utility Building

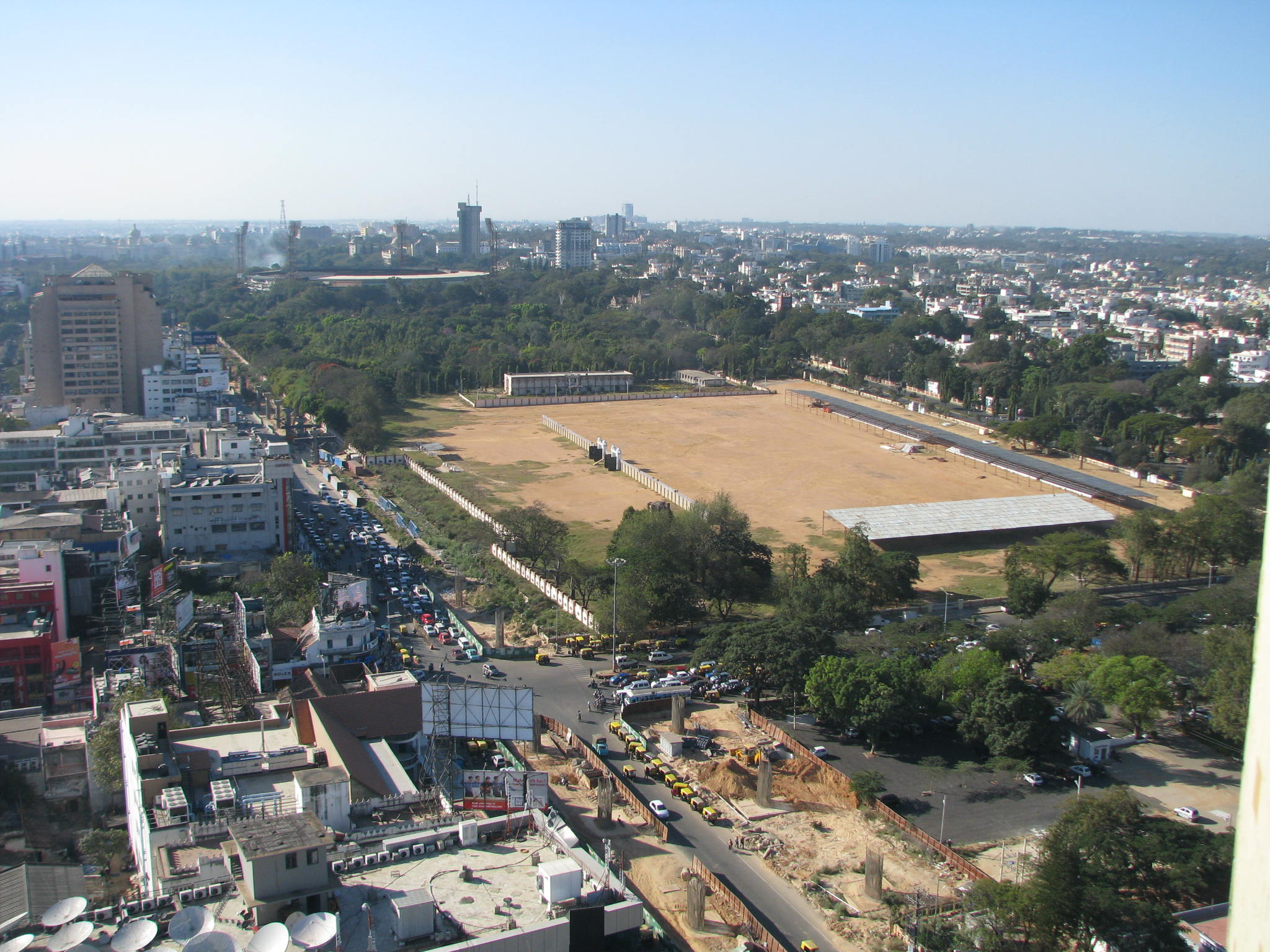
Aerial view from MG road Utility Building

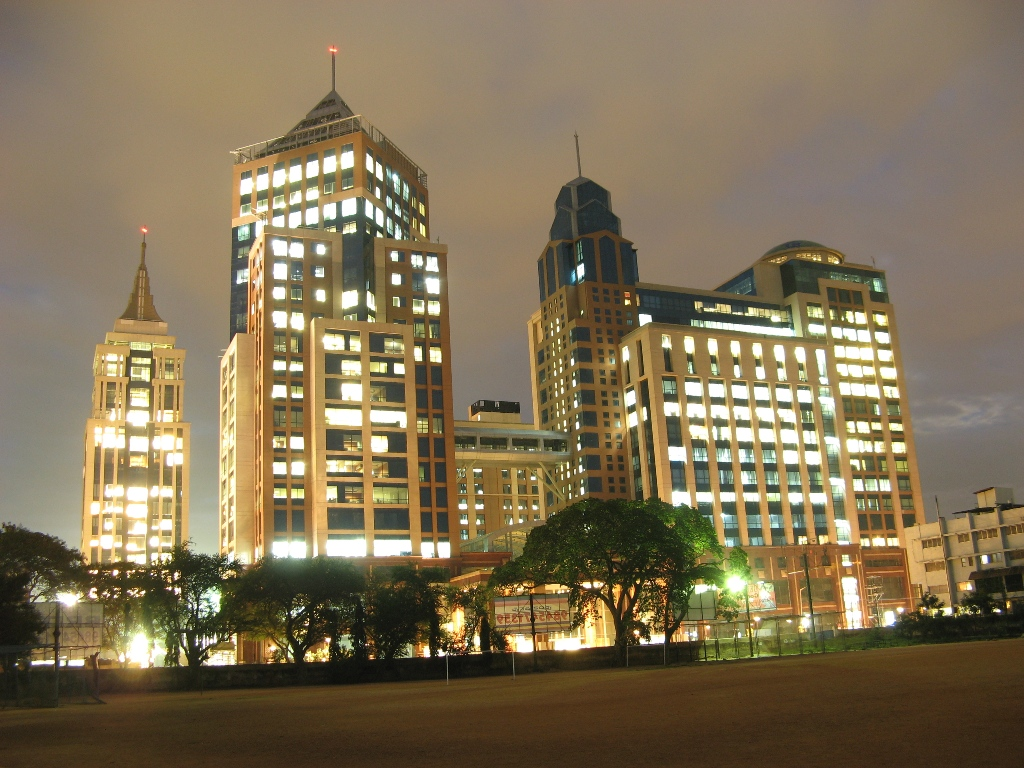
UB City at night
