= Infantry Road =

Street in Bangalore, India

Bhagwan Mahaveer Jain Road, commonly known as Infantry Road, is a 1.6-kilometer long one-way street in Bangalore's Central Business District. It connects Raj Bhavan with Commercial Street, and houses commercial, educational and administrative properties.

The street was home to military activities of the foot soldiers of the British Raj in the 19th century, deriving its name from the nearby military barracks. The Bruhat Bengaluru Mahanagara Palike (BBMP) officially renamed the street "Bhagwan Mahaveer Jain Road" in 2004.

== See also ==
- Bangalore Cantonment
