= Center for Study of Science, Technology and Policy =

Indian think tank

- Established: 2005; 21 years ago
- Chair: V. S. R. Arunachalam
- Head: Jai Asundi
- Address: No. 18 & 19, 10th Cross, Mayura Street, Papanna Layout, Nagashettyhalli (RMV II Stage), Bengaluru 560094 Karnataka, India
- Location: Bengaluru, India
- Website: cstep.in

The Center for Study of Science, Technology and Policy (CSTEP) is an Indian think-tank based in Bengaluru.

Its research is consolidated into six sectors: Climate, Environment and Sustainability; Energy and Power; Renewables and Energy Conservation; AI and Digital Platforms; Strategic Studies; and Air Quality.

== History ==
CSTEP was founded in 2005 by Dr V. S. R. Arunachalam, former Scientific Advisor to India's Defence Minister (1982-1992) and former head of DRDO, along with Professor P Rama Rao. Dr Anshu Bharadwaj, a former IAS officer, was the first executive director from 2009 to 2020 before being succeeded by Dr Jai Asundi.

In 2008, CSTEP received its first grant from Shri Sivasubramaniya Nadar Educational and Charitable Trust to conduct studies in energy. In 2018 the organization created the Centre for Air Pollution Studies (CAPS) and launched the Artificial Intelligence & Digital Labs.

== Staff ==
In 2022, CSTEP employed 126 people in fields such as science and engineering, policy, economics, IT, management, and communication. As of 2022 its chairman was its founder Dr. Arunachalam and its executive director is Dr. Jai Asundi (2020 onwards).

== Location ==
CSTEP was founded in Arunachalam's residence in Bengaluru and later worked out of the CAIR (DRDO) office on Infantry Road, Bengaluru. As of 2022, CSTEP operates out of two locations, with one office in Bengaluru and another in Noida.

== Activities ==
=== India Clean Air Summit ===
The India Clean Air Summit (ICAS) is CSTEP's flagship event on Air Pollution, organised by the Air Quality sector. Each year, the summit focuses on a specific theme, reflecting the evolving challenges and priorities in the field of air quality management.

• ICAS 2019 marked the launch of the event, bringing together policymakers, researchers, industry experts, and civil society organisations to initiate discussions on air pollution and its wide-ranging impacts.

• ICAS 2020 (‘Finding the Missing Evidence’) focused on identifying gaps in air pollution data and research and emphasised the need for a common data-sharing platform and a ‘democratic’ approach to studying and resolving air pollution.

• ICAS 2021 (‘Clean Air for Healthy Living’) highlighted several important topics, including the critical link between air quality and public health and the lack of studies in India to assess the health impacts of air pollution.

• ICAS 2022 (‘Looking at Air Pollution Through the Climate Lens’) explored the interconnections between air pollution and climate change and addressed how air pollution control measures can contribute to climate change mitigation and vice versa.

• ICAS 2023 (‘Clean Air for Sustainable Development and Mission LiFE’) aimed to explore the need to prioritise clean air for sustainable development and Mission LiFE—India’s most ambitious policy yet to address climate change.

• ICAS 2024 (‘The Participatory Future of Air Quality Management’) is being hosted in collaboration with the Clean Air Monitoring and Solutions Network (CAMS-Net) from 26 to 30 August 2024.

=== Role of Science & Technology for Society ===
In March 2020, CSTEP initiated a Discussion Series on the Role of Science & Technology for Society, with the stated aim of making "science accessible to citizens to find sustainable solutions for India's developmental challenges".

The first event of the series was woven around the launch of Dr Arunachalam's book ‘From Temples to Turbines: An Adventure in Two Worlds’. The Chief Designer of LCA Tejas, Kota Harinarayana, and former Chief Secretary to the Government of Karnataka SV Ranganath, were the main speakers at the event.

=== India Energy Transformation Platform ===
CSTEP is the Secretariat for the India Energy Transformation Platform, a program created in 2018 to strategize on India's long-term energy future.

=== The eARTh Climate Fellowship ===
CSTEP launched the eARTh Initiative on 14 October 2023 at the Bangalore International Centre, Karnataka, India, bringing art to the heart of climate action. The event brought together scientists, artists, conservationists, and citizens to explore how art and science can trigger a positive change for the planet. The objective of the eARTh Initiative is to build a collective of artists and communicators and highlight the climate crisis in an accessible manner to initiate climate action. The eARTh Climate Fellowship for students came to fruition as a result of the Initiative. The nine-month fellowship programme began in January 2024 and ended in September 2024. The selected fellows attended periodical offline sessions and worked on their artistic outputs, which were displayed during the second eARTh event held in October 2024.

== Funding ==
CSTEP is registered under Section 25 of the Companies Act, 1956 and receives grants from national and international foundations, industry trusts, and governments.

It has received grants from foundations such as the International Development Research Centre (IDRC), OAK Foundation, Rohini & Nandan Nilekani Philanthropies, World Bank, United Nations Development Programme, the Bill and Melinda Gates Foundation, and many others.

== Policy influence ==
It has been involved in a number of policy projects in collaboration with the Indian government as well as national and international organizations such as the Gates Foundation, IBM, Bureau of Energy Efficiency, and the Planning Commission.

== Collaborative projects ==
CSTEP has also collaborated with other organizations on various projects. It was one of the Indian organizations which participated in SERIIUS, a joint clean energy development program established by the Government of India and the US Department of Energy, as well as multiple projects with the European Union.
