= Commercial Street, Bengaluru =

Street in Bangalore, Karnataka, India

Coordinates: 12.9821663°N 77.6083553°E

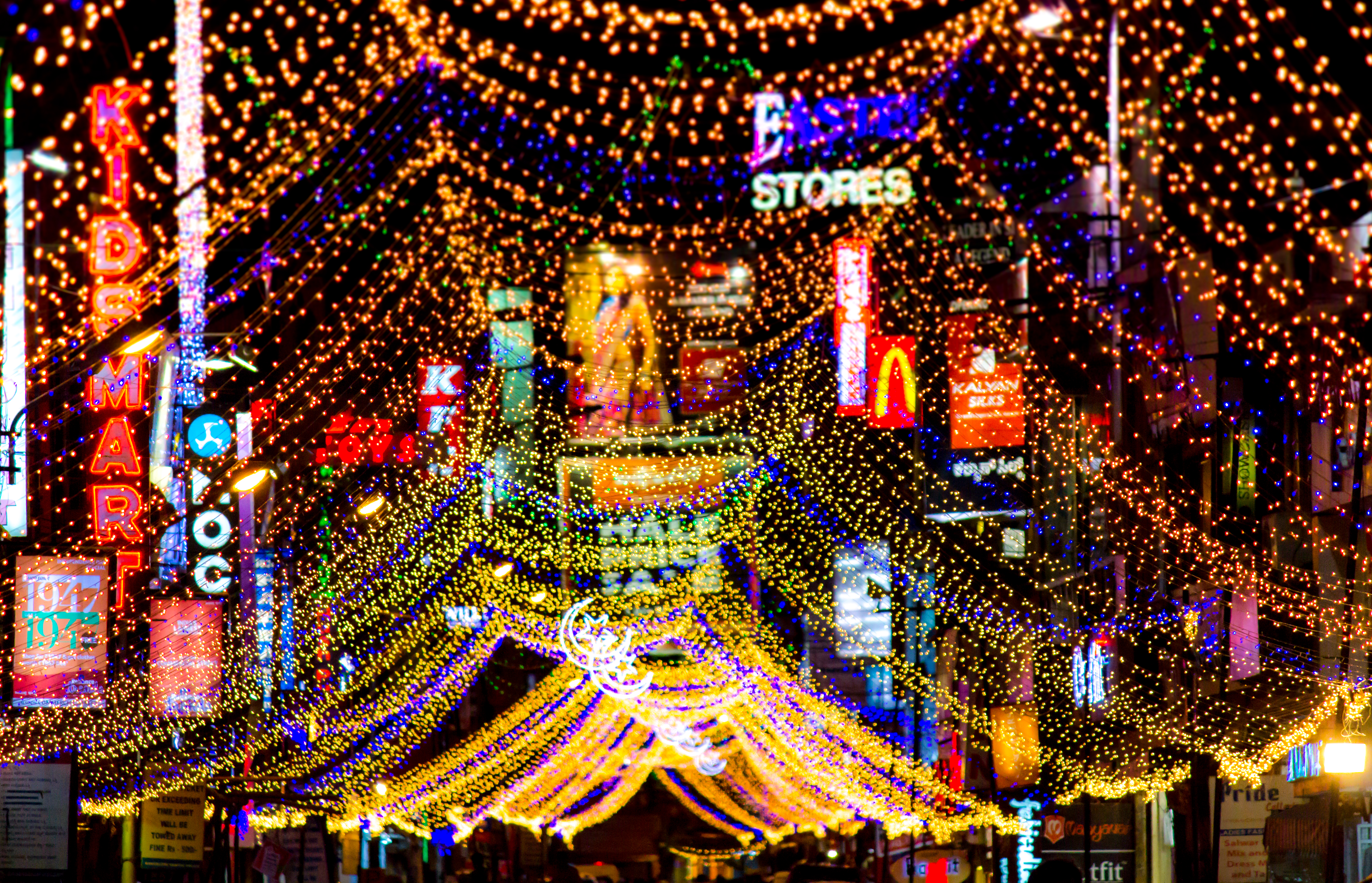
Commercial Street during Eid in 2012.

Commercial Street is a street in Bangalore, the state capital of Karnataka, India. One of the oldest and busiest shopping areas of the city, the street is famous for its trade in clothes, footwear, jewellery, electronics; and food joints. With only 75 parking slots available on the street for four-wheelers, the street is one of the most crowded in the city.

It's expands between OPH road and K Kamraj road. the shopping locations extend to its bylanes including Dispensary Road and Abrahim Sahab street.

Commercial Street lies in the heart of the city in the Central Business District area in Tasker Town, close to M G Road, another popular shopping area, and Russell Market in Shivajinagar.

== Gallery ==
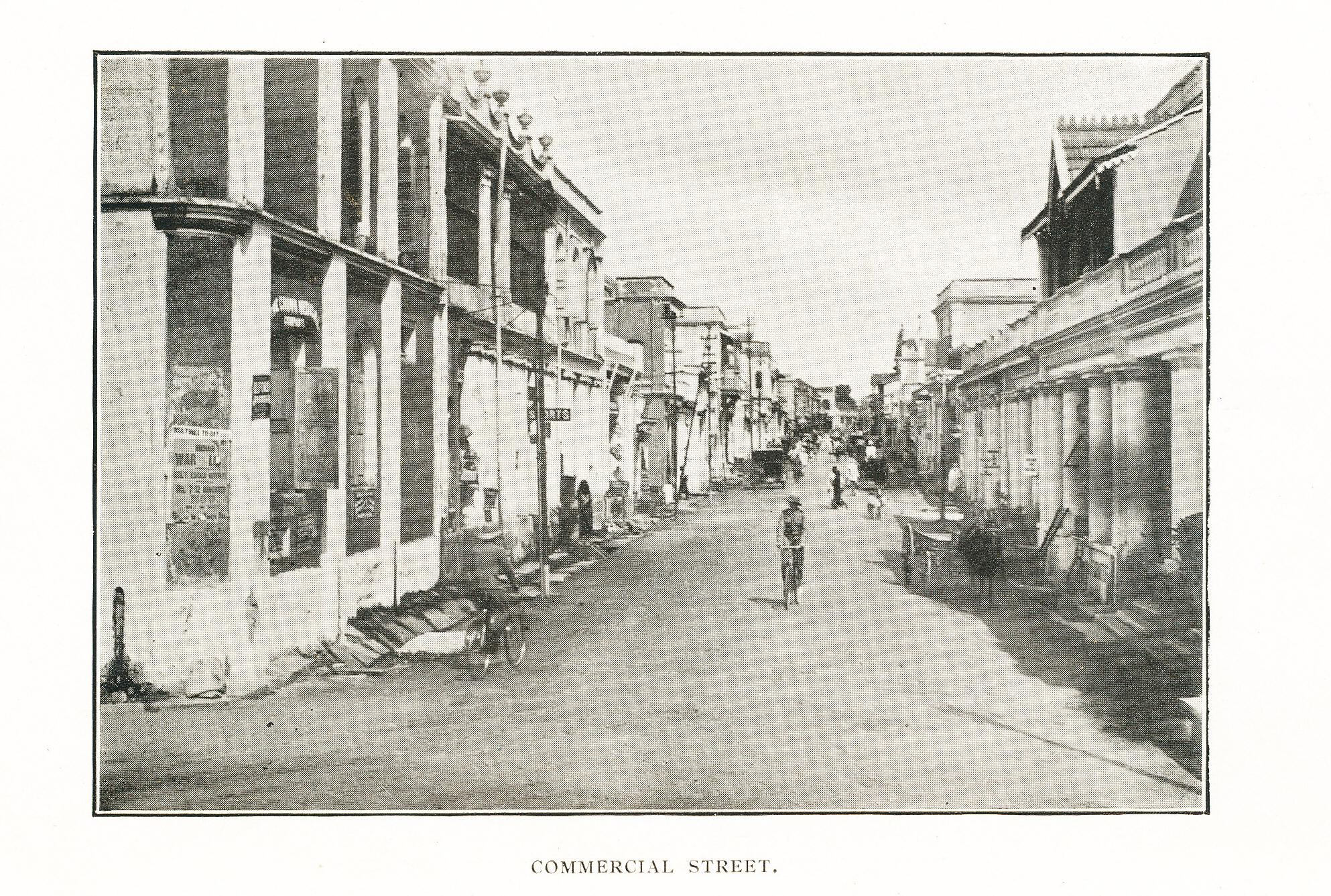
Commercial Street in 1900

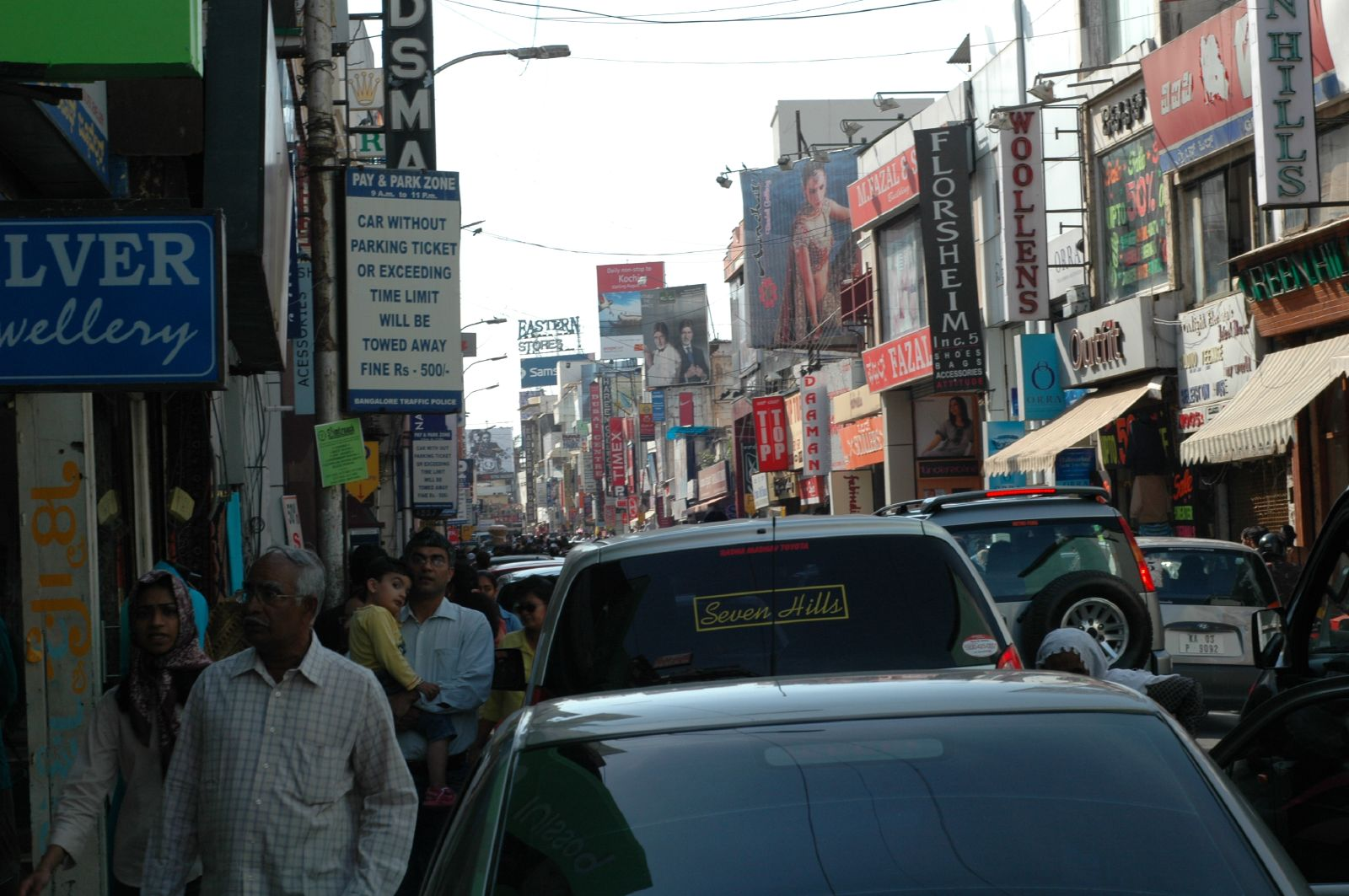
Commercial Street during daytime

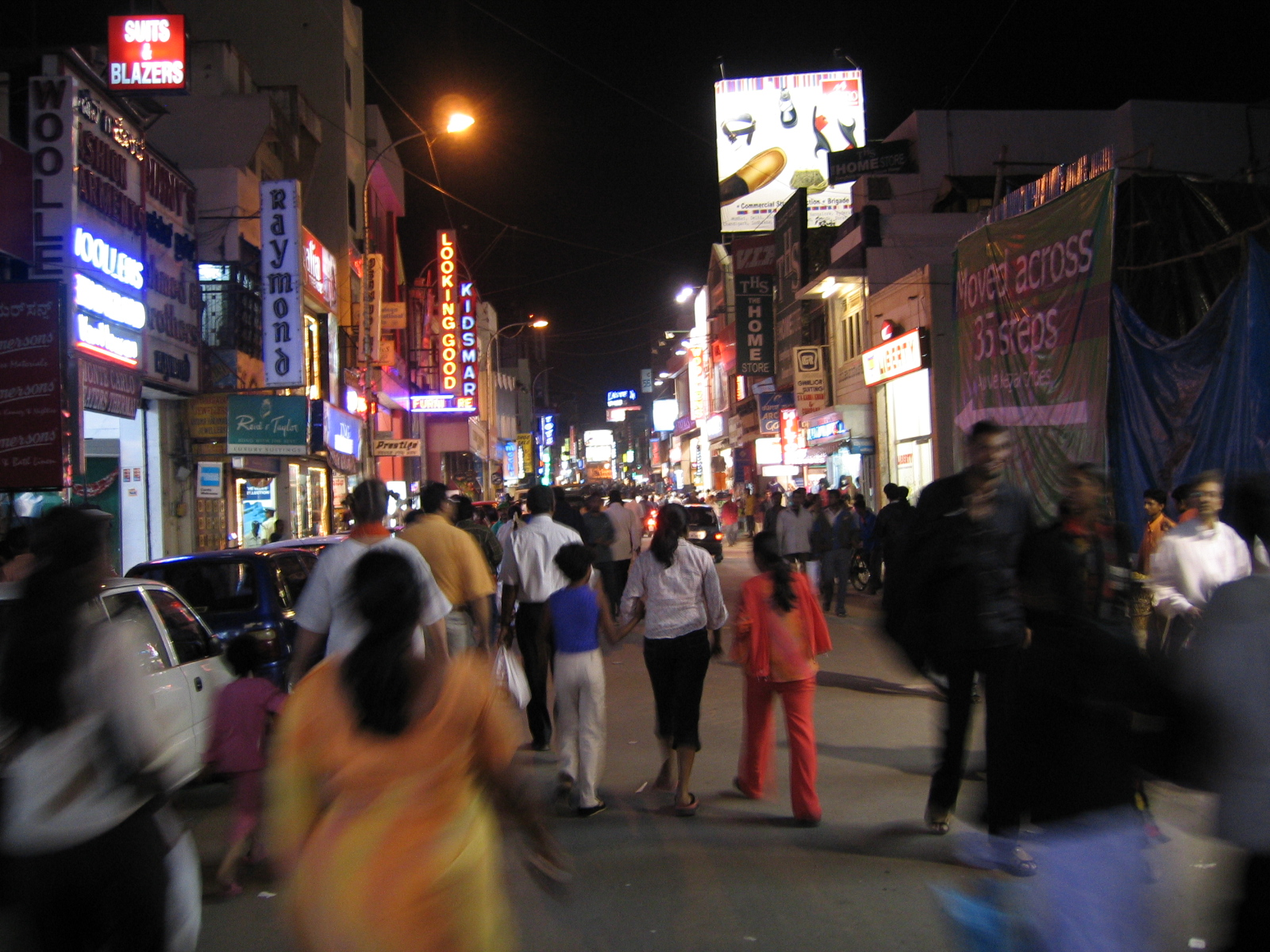
Commercial Street during evening
