= Sree Dandu Mariamman Temple, Bengaluru =

Coordinates: 12°59′05″N 77°36′05″E

Sree Dandu Mariamman Temple, in Shivajinagar (also called Shivajinagara) in Bangalore city, is dedicated to the deity Mariamman (the Hindu god Shakthi or Parvathi).
