= Church Street, Bengaluru =

Street in Bengaluru, India

Coordinates: 12.975006°N 77.604785°E

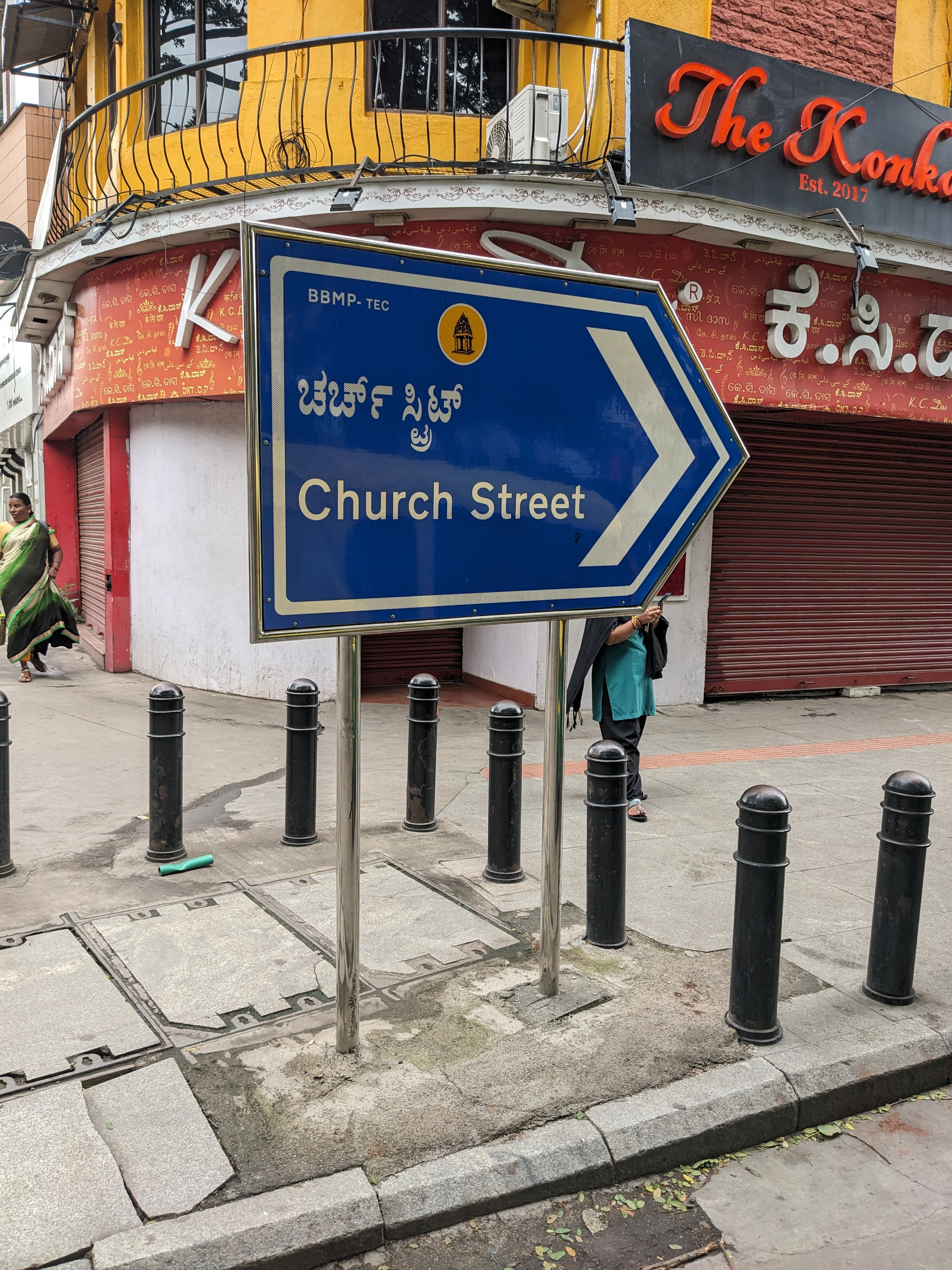
Church Street signpost

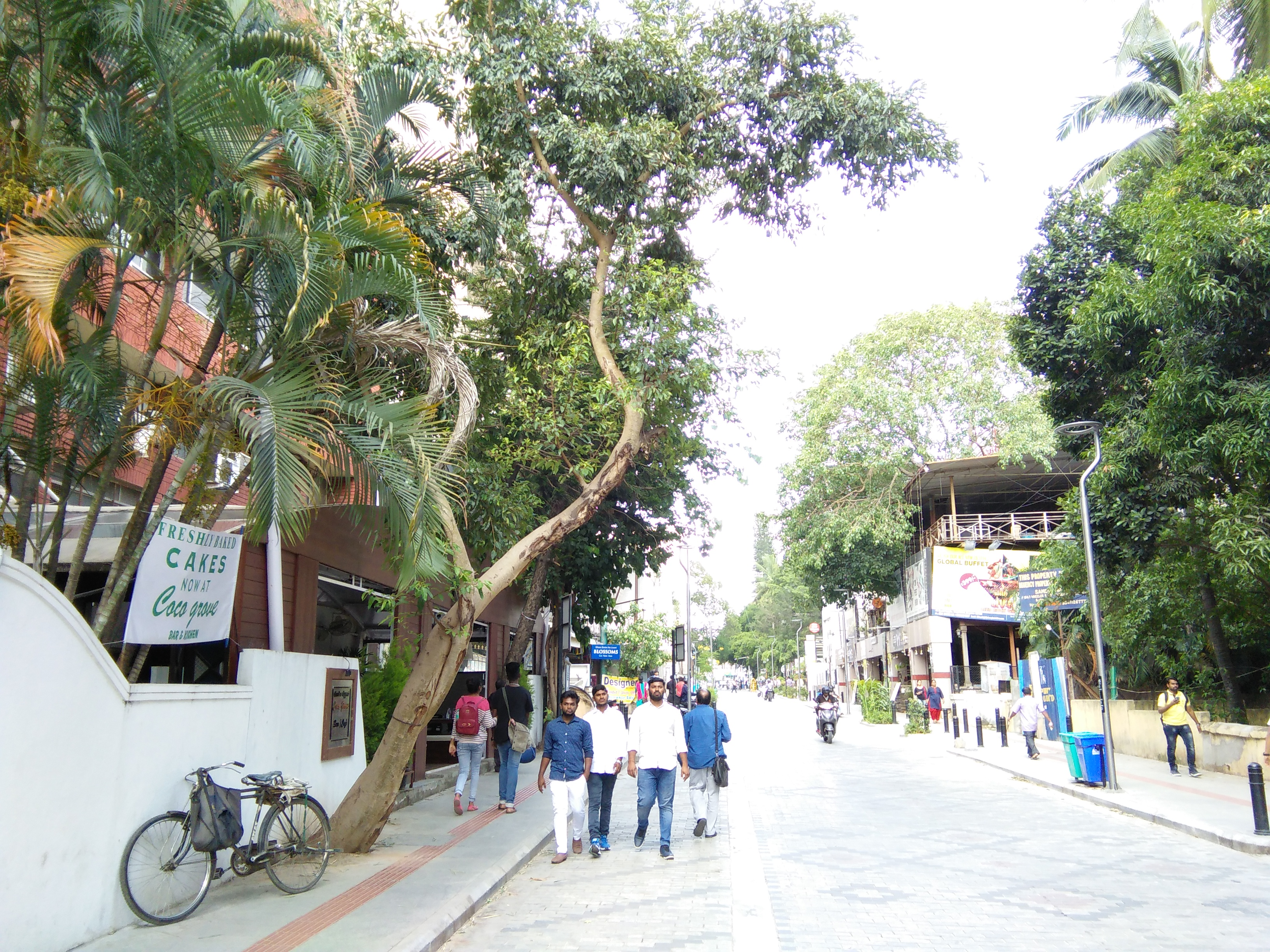
A view of Church Street in June 2018.

Church Street is a busy street in the Central Business District of Bengaluru, India. It is a 750-metre stretch from Brigade Road to St. Mark's Road, running parallel to M G Road. The street is named for St. Mark's Cathedral to which it leads.

A tourist hotspot, Church Street is a major shopping and nightlife area. It is also a popular New Year's Eve celebration centre.

In 2017, redevelopment work began on Church Street at a cost of ₹9 crore, which made it the first street in the city to be paved from granite cobblestones. The cobblestones were laid in a Kasuti pattern to reflect Karnataka's cultural heritage.

In 2020, Church Street ran a pilot project called Clean Air Street during which the street was converted into a pedestrian zone with a complete ban on automobile traffic.

The pedestrian zone was a trial conducted with many interested stakeholders and academic research organisations as a 'test-bed' for sustainable urban redesign and community wellness.

The experiment included open air seating, cultural events, and mobility support in the form of buggies and e-rickshaws for the disables and senior citizens.

The trial was closely monitored by Indian Institute of Science (IISc) to evaluate the social, environmental and economic impacts. Avg. daily footfall increased 92%, in peak hours 117% increase in footfall was recorded. Over 50% of establishments reported increased revenue. Air quality also improved measurably. 98% of those surveyed enjoyed the new church st.

The experiment was ended on May 31,2021. The official reason given was that the project was handed over to the BBMP. The BBMP denied they had received instructions to continue the project. This decision was widely seen as politically motivated.

== See also ==
- 2014 Bangalore bombing – an IED blast on Church Street that caused one death and injuries to four others. The attack was suspected to have been carried out by the terrorist organisation Indian Mujahideen.
