= East Parade Church =

- East Parade Church, Bangalore
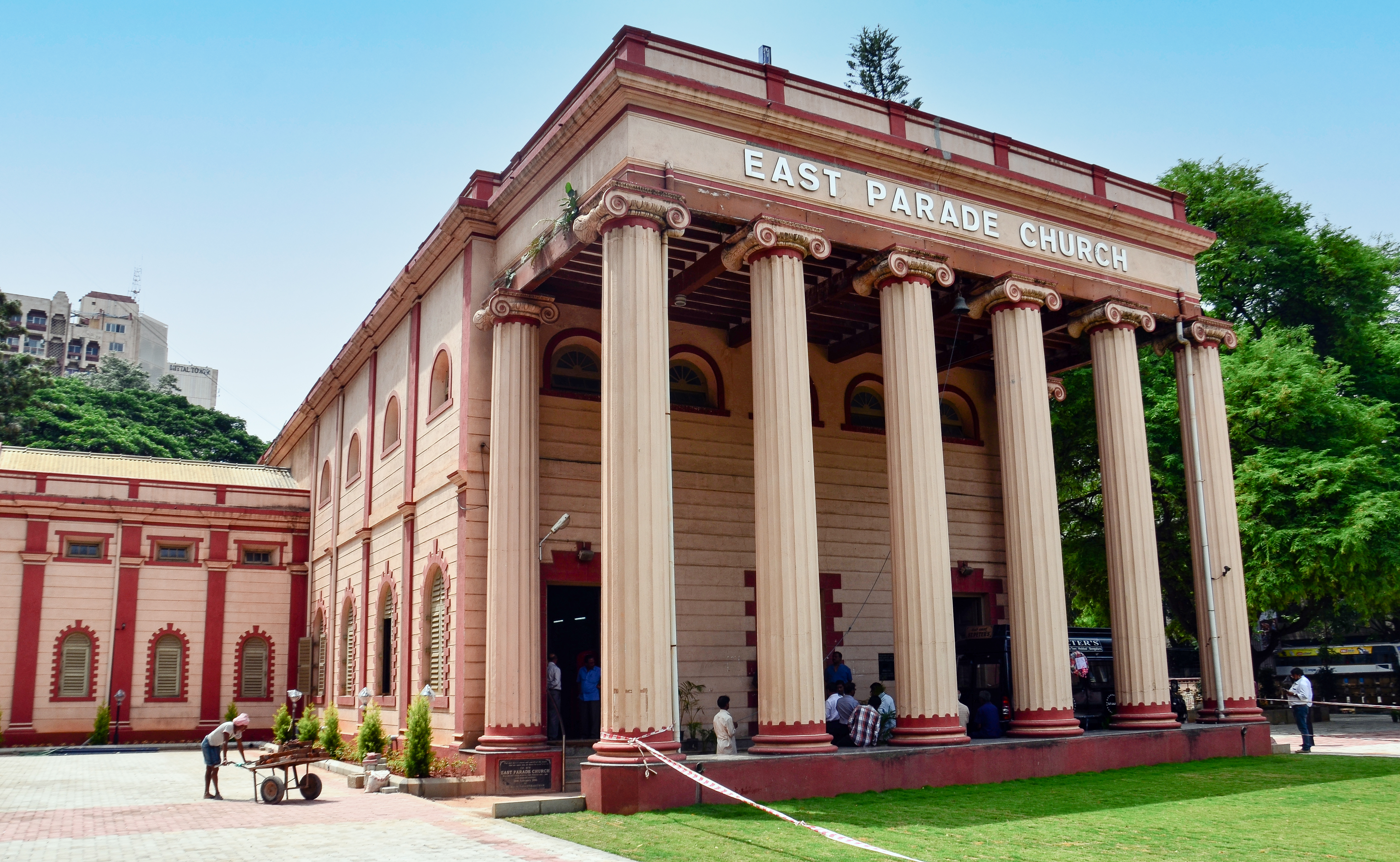

- Location within Karnataka Location within India
- 12°58′26″N 77°36′52″E
- Location: Bangalore
- Country: India
- Denomination: Church of South India
- Tradition: Wesleyan

History
- Former name(s): Wesleyan Mission Chapel, Bangalore
- Consecrated: 1865

Architecture
- Architectural type: Classical Corinthian
- Style: Neo-classical
- Groundbreaking: 6 October 1863

Administration
- Diocese: Karnataka Central Diocese

Clergy
- Bishop: Rt. Rev. Dr. Prasana Kumar Samuel

The East Parade Church, consecrated in 1865, is located on Mahatma Gandhi Road, in the Bangalore Cantonment. The church comes under the Karnataka Central Diocese of the Church of South India. Started in the early 19th century as the Wesleyan Mission Chapel by Wesleyan believers of the Madras Army with Tamil and English services, the Church now has services in Tamil and Malayalam. The name East Parade comes from its location on the East of the Parade Grounds of the Madras Engineer Group (MEG) regiment. The present church building was raised in 1865, on the site of the old Wesleyan Mission Chapel, with an inscription dated 6 October 1863 marking the laying of the foundation stone.

== Wesleyan Tamil Mission, Bangalore ==
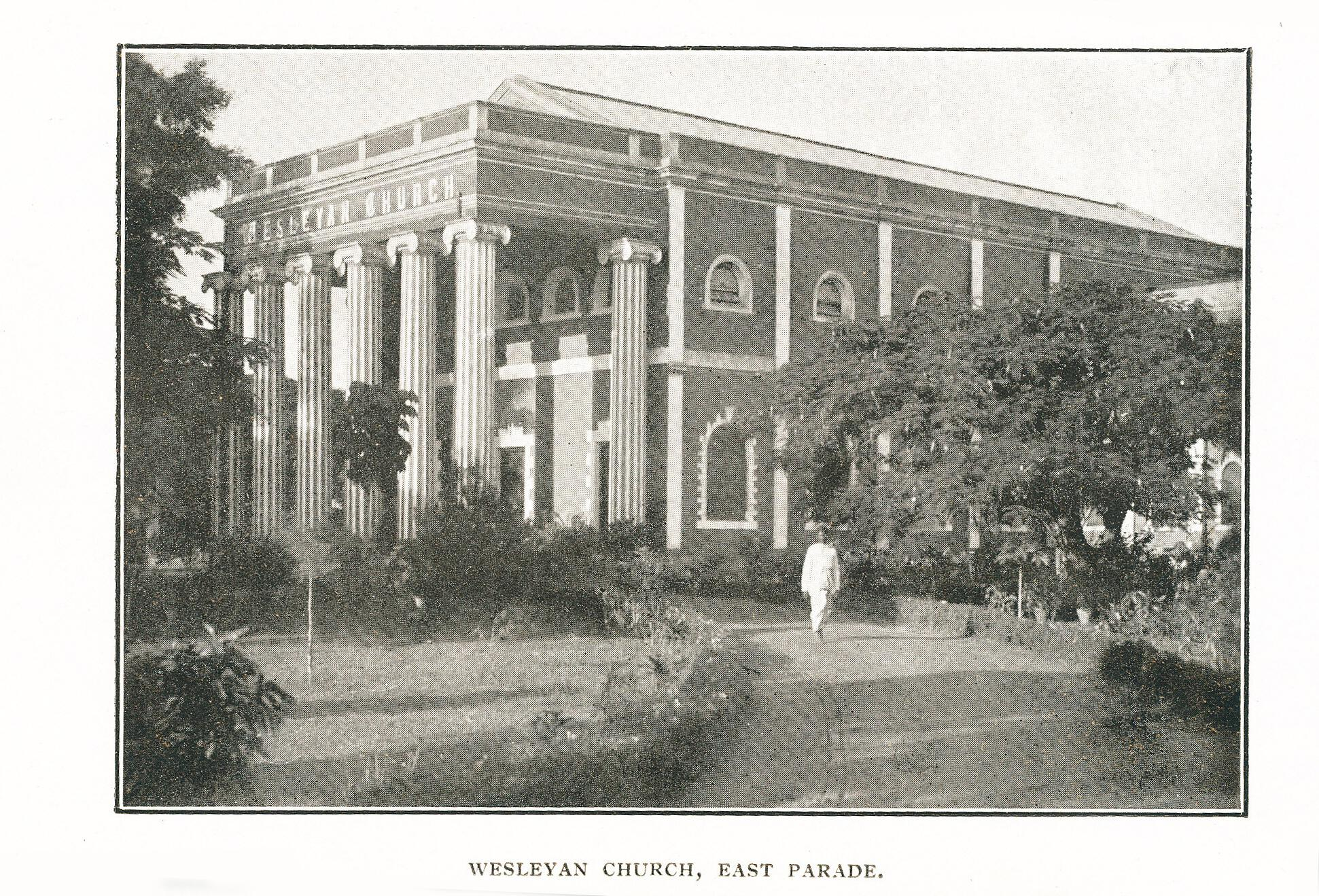
Wesleyan Church, East Parade (C H Doveton, 1900)

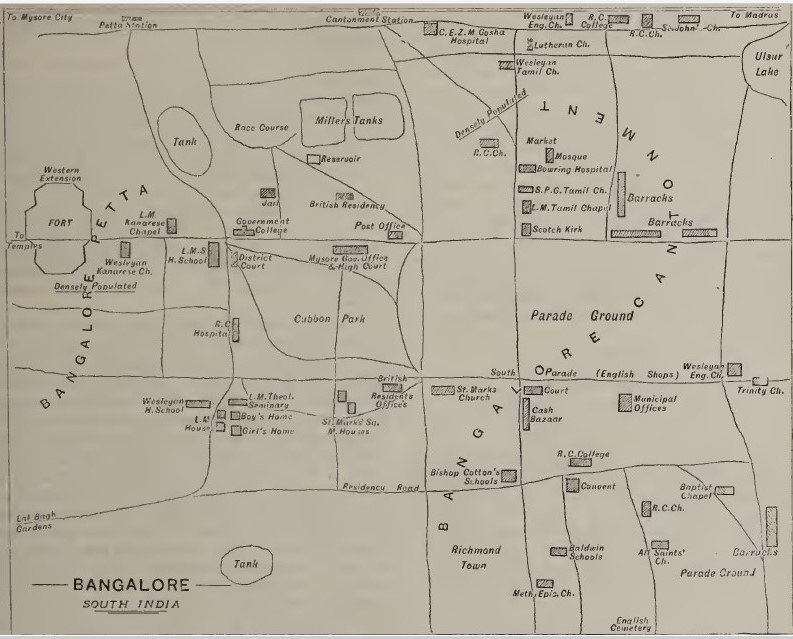
Bangalore, South India, 1898, Rough Map by Rev. T E Slater of LMS showing the location of the Wesleyan Mission Chapel

The Wesleyan Tamil Mission in the Bangalore Cantonment was established in 1821. In November 1821, Elijah Hoole of the Wesleyan Mission applied to the Government of Madras for granting permission for starting a school and preaching place for the native population in the Bangalore Cantonment. The land selected had been previously obtained for the same purpose by a member of the Wesleyan Society who had lived temporarily in the Bangalore Cantonment, and had built a mud building with a thatched roof, which was in ruins in 1821. The permission was granted and a small building measuring 30 ft. length and 13 ft. width was constructed under the supervision of Mr. Mowat.

In the early 19th century, the St. Mark's Church was the official Church of England station church of the East India Company for the officers and men of the Madras Army, stationed in the Bangalore Civil and Military Station. The Wesleyan soldiers of the Madras Army stationed in the Bangalore Civil and Military Station wanted their own church, and managed to secure a property for this purpose. A small school was built on this site and Tamil services began in this building. However, in 1822, the Wesleyan Mission was suspended and missionaries Mowat and Hoole were transferred. In 1826, the mission resumed with Rev. J F England taking charge. By this time, the school room had fallen into repairs, and a stable in the Mission compound had to be used as a church. These services were attended by soldiers and some Europeans of the Cantonment. The terms under which the Maharaja of Mysore transferred the Bangalore Civil and Military Station to the Government of Madras was that it be strictly used for military purposes only. Hence, the Madras Government was reluctant to allow building of new churches in the Cantonment. The only other option was to acquire private properties. Due to the time taken those days for journeying between England and India, the approval from the committee in England took more than a year.

== Wesleyan Mission Chapel ==
William Arthur (an Irishman, after whom the William Arthur Memorial Church at Goobie is named after), provides a description of the Wesleyan Mission Chapel, the predecessor of the present East Parade Church (on the same site), located in the Bangalore Civil and Military Station. The Wesleyan Mission Chapel was built in front of the Wesleyan Mission House, and could accommodate nearly 300 people. Located at the heart of the Cantonment, it was raised for the Tamil and the English congregations. The cost of raising the chapel was met by subscription by local Europeans. A native who have received many honours from Lord William Bentinck, Governor General of India, contributed £100 towards raising the chapel. In front of the chapel was a wide esplanade, with trees lined up as an avenue, about a mile long (South Parade, now Mahatma Gandhi Road). The road right of the chapel (Dickenson Road) led to the Madras Army barracks, accommodating a regiment consists of a European cavalry, an infantry regiment and 2 Sepoys. The road in front of the chapel had an spacious English church on one of its ends (St. Mark's Church). At the beginning of the esplanade was the bungalow of General Mark Cubbon, the British Resident of the Kingdom of Mysore.

Further, according to Arthur, there was also a native cavalry regiment bordering a lake (Ulsoor Lake). The atmosphere was martial, with marching army men. This was the European part of Town in the Bangalore Cantonment. The Tamil population of the Cantonment were around the Alasoor (Ulsoor), Chuli (Shoolay), and the Great Bazaar (Shivajinagar). Most of the Tamil People had migrated to find employment with the Europeans. At that time it was nearly 50 years since Mysore fell into British rule, still Mysoreans were rarely recruited by the Europeans, as they preferred to employ the Tamil people and Muslims. The reason being Mysoreans being far away from the coast had very little interaction with foreigners and were shy of connecting with foreigners and maintained an independent outlook.

== Architecture ==
Foundation stone for the present structure was laid on 6 October 1863, and completed in 1865. The church was described as the Wesleyan Cathedral of Bangalore. The building was capable of accommodating 700 people. There are 8 Greek Ionic order columns in the entrance of the church. There are no columns or pillars inside the building, and hence no obstruction to the altar. The church underwent extensive renovation was re-concentrated on 26 February 2006.
