= V. S. R. Arunachalam =

Indian scientist (1935–2023)

Vallampadugai Srinivasa Raghavan Arunachalam

6th Director General of Defence research and development organisation
- In office 1982-1992
- Preceded by: Raja Ramanna
- Succeeded by: APJ Abdul Kalam

Vallampadugai Srinivasa Raghavan Arunachalam (10 November 1935 – 16 August 2023) was an Indian scientist and former head of the Defence Research and Development Organisation (DRDO). He was the founder and chairman of the Center for Study of Science, Technology and Policy (CSTEP), a science and technology think tank.

== Early life and education ==
Arunachalam was born on 10 November 1935. He held bachelor's and master's degrees in science and received his PhD degree in materials science and engineering from the University of Wales, in 1965. He was also alumnus of Sharada Vilas College Mysuru.

== Career ==
Arunachalam worked as a scientist at the Bhabha Atomic Research Centre, National Aeronautical Laboratory in Bangalore, and Defence Metallurgical Research Laboratory in Hyderabad. He was the head of the Defence Research and Development Organisation (DRDO) for about ten years in the 1980s. During his tenure the budget of DRDO increased eightfold, and he is credited with being able to get over both bureaucratic and financial hurdles. He initiated major defence projects like the Light Combat Aircraft and the Integrated Guided Missiles programmes.

Arunachalam served as defence scientific advisor to the Defence Minister of India between 1982 and 1992, serving ten defence ministers and five prime ministers, and as secretary, Department of Defence Research for the Government of India. He advised the government on the definition, assessment and review of a number of major technological and societal programs such as optical fiber communications for India, development of indigenous iron and steel technologies, scientific and technological missions for the country to eradicate illiteracy, infant mortality etc. He also advised the government in the area of graduate education in engineering.

Arunachalam was a collaborating professor of engineering and public policy at the Carnegie Mellon University, and an honorary professor at the UK's University of Warwick. He was a member of the Defence Research & Development Service (DRDS).

== Awards ==
Arunachalam received numerous awards and medals, including the Shanti Swarup Bhatnagar Prize for Science and Technology in Engineering Science in 1980. He was the first Indian to be elected as a Fellow of the Royal Academy of Engineering, UK.

Arunachalam was conferred the Padma Bhushan in 1985 and the Padma Vibhushan 1990 for his contribution to Indian science. In 2015, he was awarded DRDO') lifetime achievement award for his outstanding contribution in the field of scientific research and technology.

== Death ==
Arunachalam died in California on 16 August 2023, at the age of 87.
