= Seshadripuram =

- Neighborhood
- Location within Bengaluru
- Coordinates: 12°59′N 77°34′E
- Country: India
- State: Karnataka
- Metro: Bangalore
- Named for: K. Seshadri Iyer

Government
  - Type: Municipal Corporation
  - Body: Bengaluru Central City Corporation

Languages
  - Official: Kannada
- Time zone: UTC+5:30 (IST)
- PIN: 560020
- Vehicle registration: KA02

Seshadripuram is a residential and commercial locality in central Bengaluru, India. It is named after K. Seshadri Iyer, who was a Dewan of Mysore State. It is also known for its colleges, including the Seshadripuram Educational Institutions.

The locality is bounded by Rajajinagar to the west, Vasanth Nagar to the east, Binnipete and Gandhi Nagar to the south and Malleswaram to the north.
