= Vasanth Nagar =

- Upscale Neighborhood
- Interactive map of Vasanth Nagar
- Country: India
- State: Karnataka
- Metro: Bangalore

Languages
  - Official: Kannada English
- Time zone: UTC+5:30 (IST)
- PIN: 560052

Vasanth Nagar is an upscale neighbourhood located in the heart of the city of Bangalore. A small neighbourhood in the affluent High Grounds residing many retired government bureaucrats, MLA's and Police officials. It is bounded by Bengaluru Golf Club, Palace Grounds, Shivajinagar and Bangalore Cantonment. Surrounded by major roads, landmarks, offices and hotels, this area is commercially very active now.

Star luxury hotels Shangri-la, Le Méridien, The Lalit Ashok and ITC Windsor Manor are all in its vicinity. The Bangalore Palace, the Vidhan Soudha State Legislative Assembly, National Gallery of Modern Art, Cunningham Road and Jawaharlal Nehru Planetarium are the major attractions situated here. Other notable addresses in the locality include Balbrooie guest house, French Consulate, Congress state office, Billiards and Snooker Federation of India(BSFI), Karnataka State Billiards Association(KSBA), Karnataka Badminton Association(KBA), Manipal Hospital Millers Road and Mysore Sales International Limited (MSIL) HQ.

This neighbourhood is seeing a rise in luxury apartments due to its tony location and proximity to the Bangalore Central Business District and other prominent addresses.

== See also ==
- Cunningham Road
