= Gandhi Nagar, Bengaluru =

Gandhi Nagar
- Neighbourhood
- Country: India
- State: Karnataka
- District: Bengaluru Urban
- City: Bengaluru
- Lok Sabha constituency: Bangalore Central
- Assembly constituency: Gandhi Nagar

Government
  - Type: Municipal Corporation
  - Body: Bengaluru Central City Corporation
  - MP: P. C. Mohan (BJP)
  - MLA: Dinesh Gundu Rao
  - Councillor: T. Gopala Krishna

Area
  - Total: 1.93 km^{2} (0.75 sq mi)
  - Land: 1.93 km^{2} (0.75 sq mi)
  - Water: 0 km^{2} (0 sq mi) 0%
  - Park area: 0.14 km^{2} (0.054 sq mi)

Population (2011 Census)
  - Total: 31,208
  - Estimate (2014): 35,310
  - Density: 16,334/km^{2} (42,300/sq mi)
  - Males: 19,566
  - Females: 15,744
- Time zone: UTC+5:30 (IST)
- Pincode: 560 009
- Area code: 080

Gandhi Nagar is a locality situated in Bengaluru. It is a bustling neighbourhood of Central Bengaluru.

== Administration ==
Gandhi Nagar is a part of ward number 94 of the Bruhat Bengaluru Mahanagara Palike (BBMP). The Gandhi Nagar ward falls under the Gandhinagar assembly constituency and the Bangalore Central parliamentary constituency. The ward has a total area of 1.93 km^{2}. Per the 2011 Census, the ward had a population of 31,208, with 6,599 households. The population of the ward declined by 11.60% from 2001 to 2011.

The following localities are a part of the Gandhi Nagar ward: Seshadripuram, Ramakrishna Layout, Nehru Nagar, VV Giri Colony, Bangalore City, Kempegowda Bus Station, R.K. Puram, Gandhinagar, Srirampuram, Okalipuram, Ramachandrapuram, Upparpet, Chikpete.
