= Cunningham Road =

Commercial street in Bangalore, India

Coordinates: 12.987694°N 77.594465°E

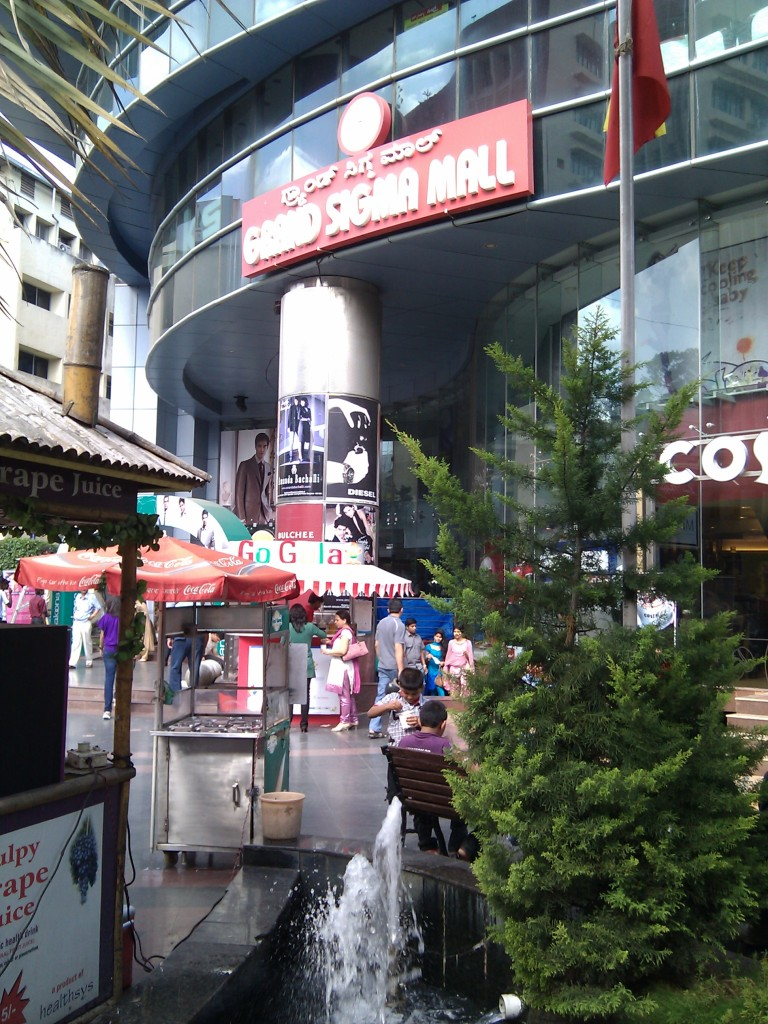
Grand Sigma Mall on Cunningham Road

Cunningham Road is one of the busiest commercial streets of Bangalore, the state capital of Karnataka, India. It is located in the Vasanthnagar area of the city. The road is named after Francis Cunningham, who was an officer in the Madras Army and a member of the Mysore Commission. The road was also called Sampangi Ramaswamy Temple Road for some time. 1. Sampangi Ramaswamy Temple Road is the present name of Cunningham Road. 2. The Grand Sigma Mall was demolished recently (1 to 2 years back) to make way for another commercial complex.
