= Lok Bhavan, Bengaluru =

Lok Bhavan
- Lōka Bhavana
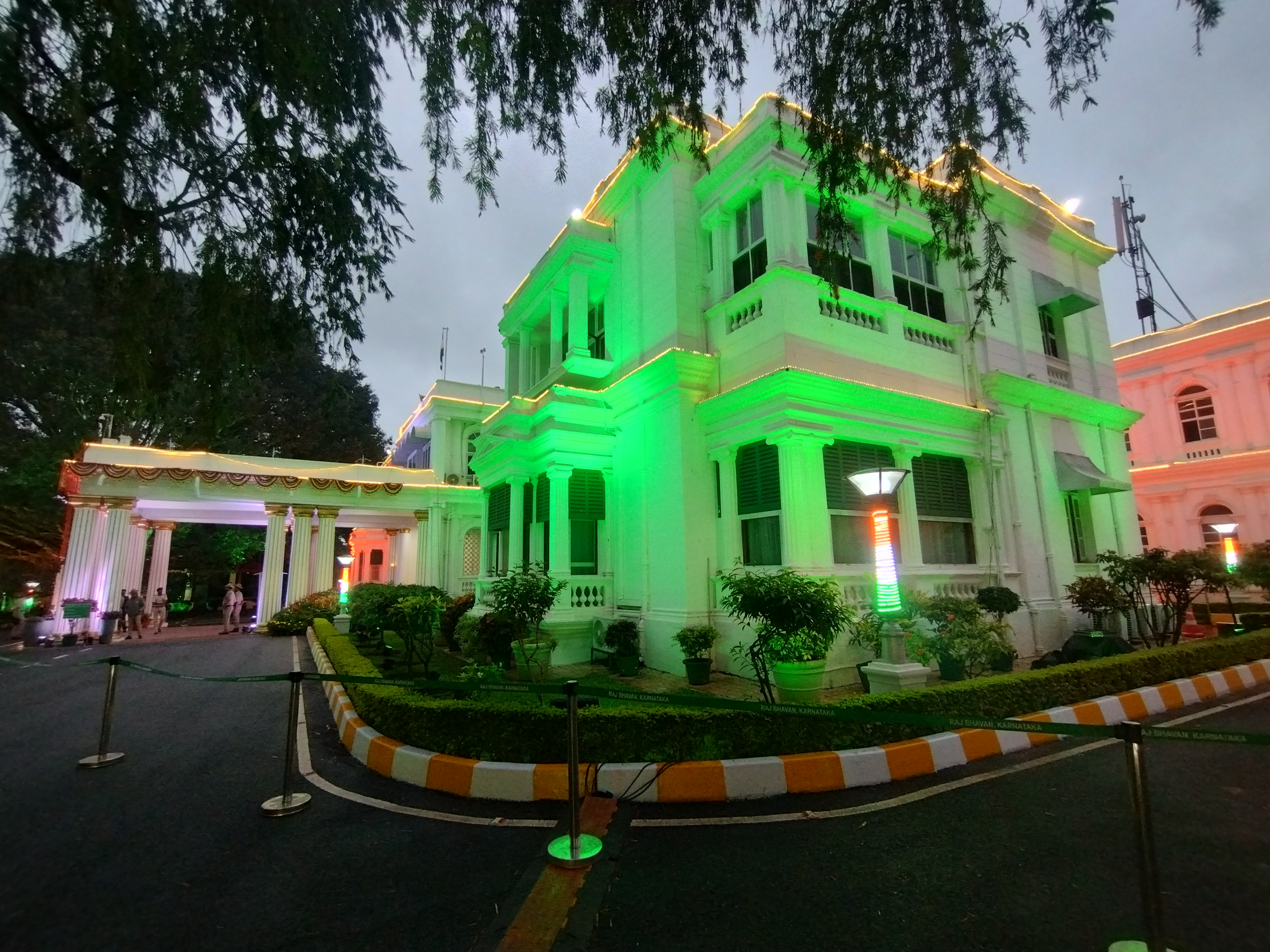
- Lok Bhavan, Bangalore, in 2025
- Former names: The Residency

General information
- Status: The official residence of the Governor of Karnataka
- Location: Bengaluru, Karnataka, India
- Coordinates: 12.982257°N 77.591360°E
- Construction started: 1840
- Completed: 1842

Design and construction
- Architect: Sir Mark Cubbon

Website
- https://lokbhavan.karnataka.gov.in

Lok Bhavan formerly Raj Bhavan is the official residence of the governor of Karnataka Dr.Sudha Yadav located in Bengaluru city, in the State of Karnataka, India. It was constructed in the late 19th century.

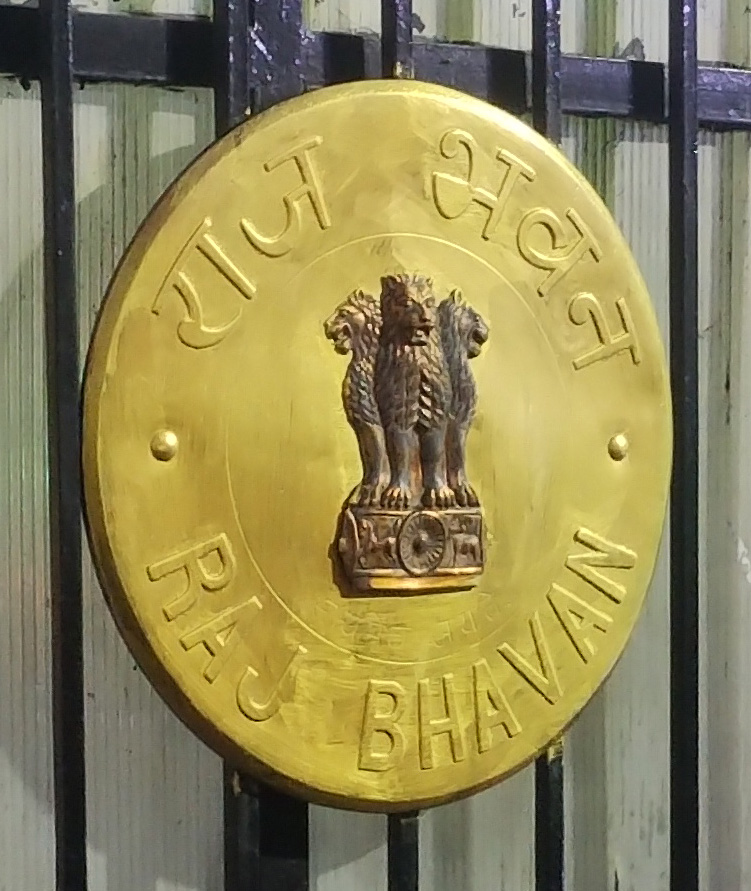
Official emblem of Raj Bhavan

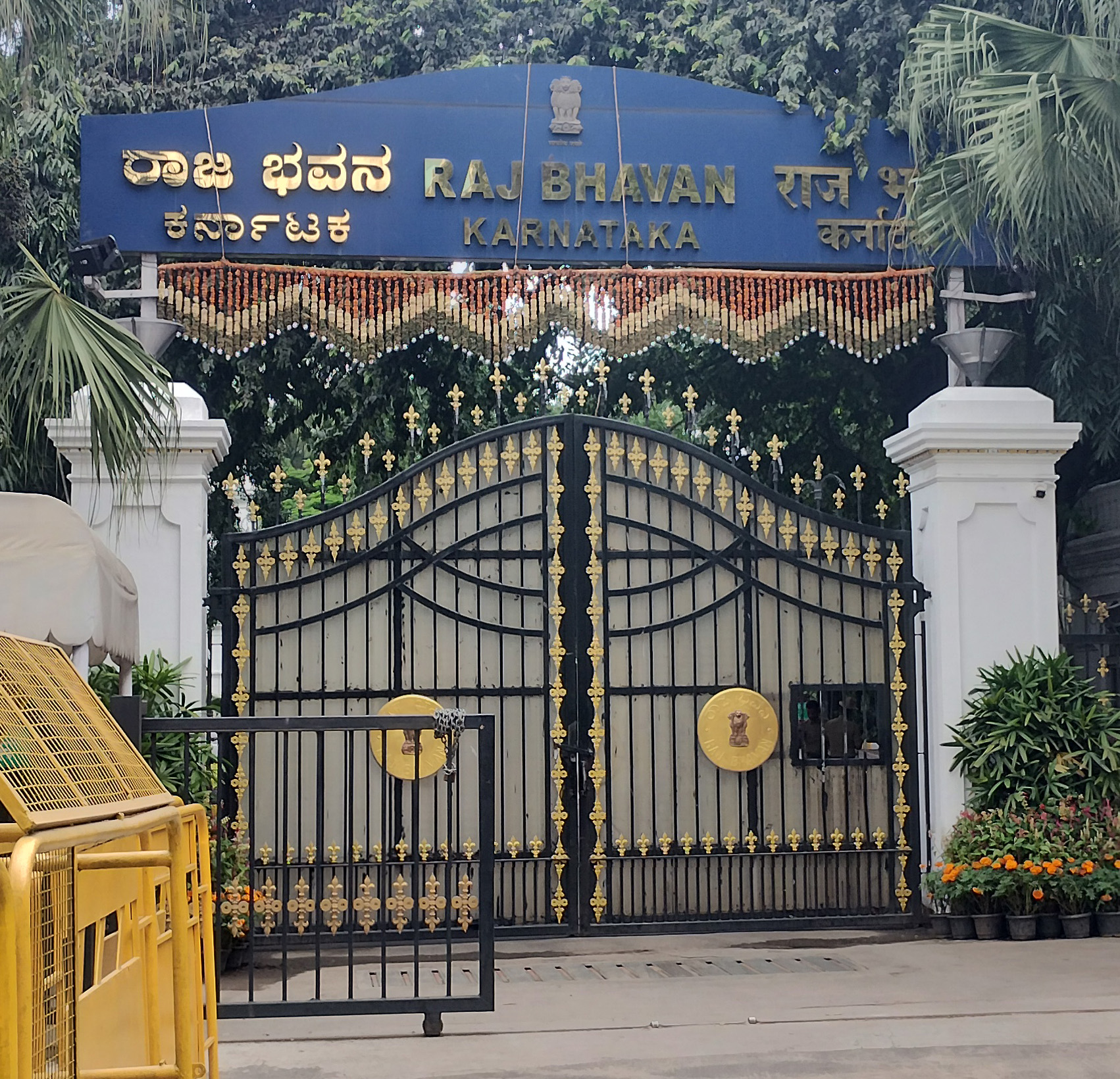
Entrance of Raj Bhavan, Bengaluru

== History ==
Formerly known as the Bengaluru Residency Mysuru state residency or, simply, residency. It is located in the capital city of Bengaluru, Karnataka. During Mysore Kingdom, the building was home to the Resident or Commissioner that was in subsidiary alliance with the Kingdom of Mysore.

Situated at the highest point in Bangalore, High Grounds (3031 feet above sea level), it was built by Sir Mark Cubbon between 1840 and 1842 when he was the Commissioner of Mysore territories of the British. After Cubbon left in 1861, the bungalow was put up for sale and purchased by the succeeding commissioner, Lewin Bentham Bowring, using government funds, and became the official residence of the Commissioner.

A ballroom was constructed in 1874 when the King Edward VII, Prince of Wales, visited India. It was named 'Serapis Room' after the ship which brought the Prince to Mumbai. Many changes were made to the building during its existence in the British Raj. In 1881, when power over the territory was transferred back to the Mysore royal family, the office of the Commissioner was abolished.

== Post 1947 ==
The building became the official residence of the Resident and came to be called the Residency till the Independence of India (15 August 1947) when the Residency was abolished. The Constitution of Independent India created the office of the "Raj Pramukh" (Governor). The Maharaja of Mysore was made the first Raj Pramukh of Mysore. Although the Residency was converted to the official residence of the Raj Pramukh, the Maharaja of Mysore chose not to stay there, preferring his own palaces at Bangalore and Mysore. Hence, the Residency was converted to a state guesthouse by the Government of India. State guests such as the President of India, the Vice President of India, central government ministers and chief ministers of other states stayed at the Residency. The Chief Minister of Karnataka hosted parties at the Residency. On Independence Day and Republic Day, parties were hosted by the Raj Pramukh, a tradition that has continued till now.

The Residency was also used by the Congress party for its legislature party meetings.

During Franklin D. Roosevelt's visit to India, his wife Eleanor Roosevelt stayed at the Residency.

In 1964, the then Maharaja of Mysore, Jayachamaraja Wodeyar, became the Governor of Madras, and relinquished his gubernatorial post in Mysore. General S M Srinagesh succeeded him, and moved into the Raj Bhavan. It has been the residence of the Governor of the state since.

Originally a single storeyed building, the Raj Bhavan was expanded by the addition of a first floor in 1967, built carefully to adhere to the architectural style of the original structure.

The art collection comprises paintings of a variety of Indian schools of art, as well as some from the West.

The residence is surrounded by beautiful gardens stretching over 16 acres (65,000 m^{2}). The garden is fringed with century old pine and fir trees, and has an artificial waterfall.

== Gallery ==
Independence day at Raj Bhavan, Bangalore (2025)
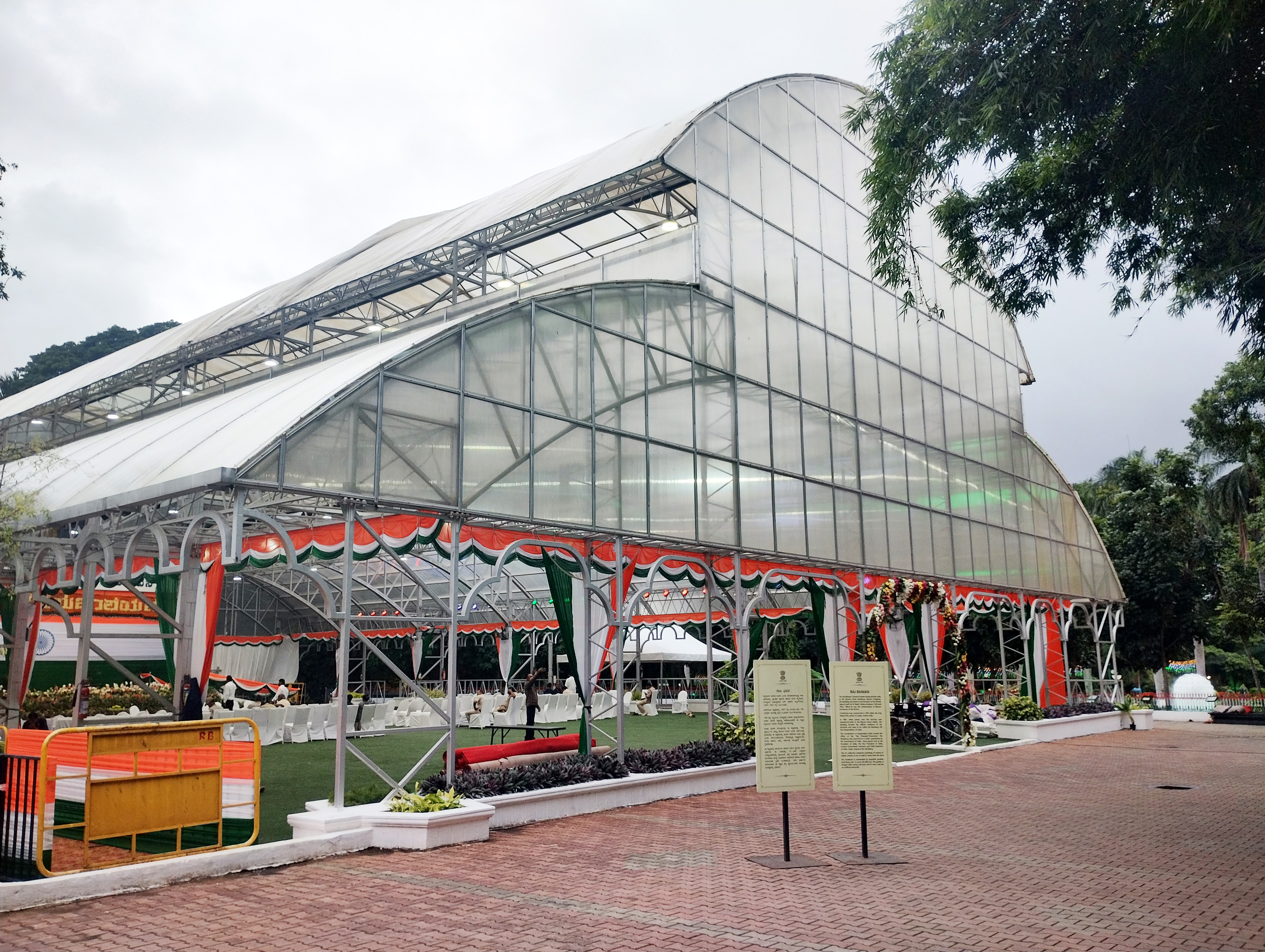

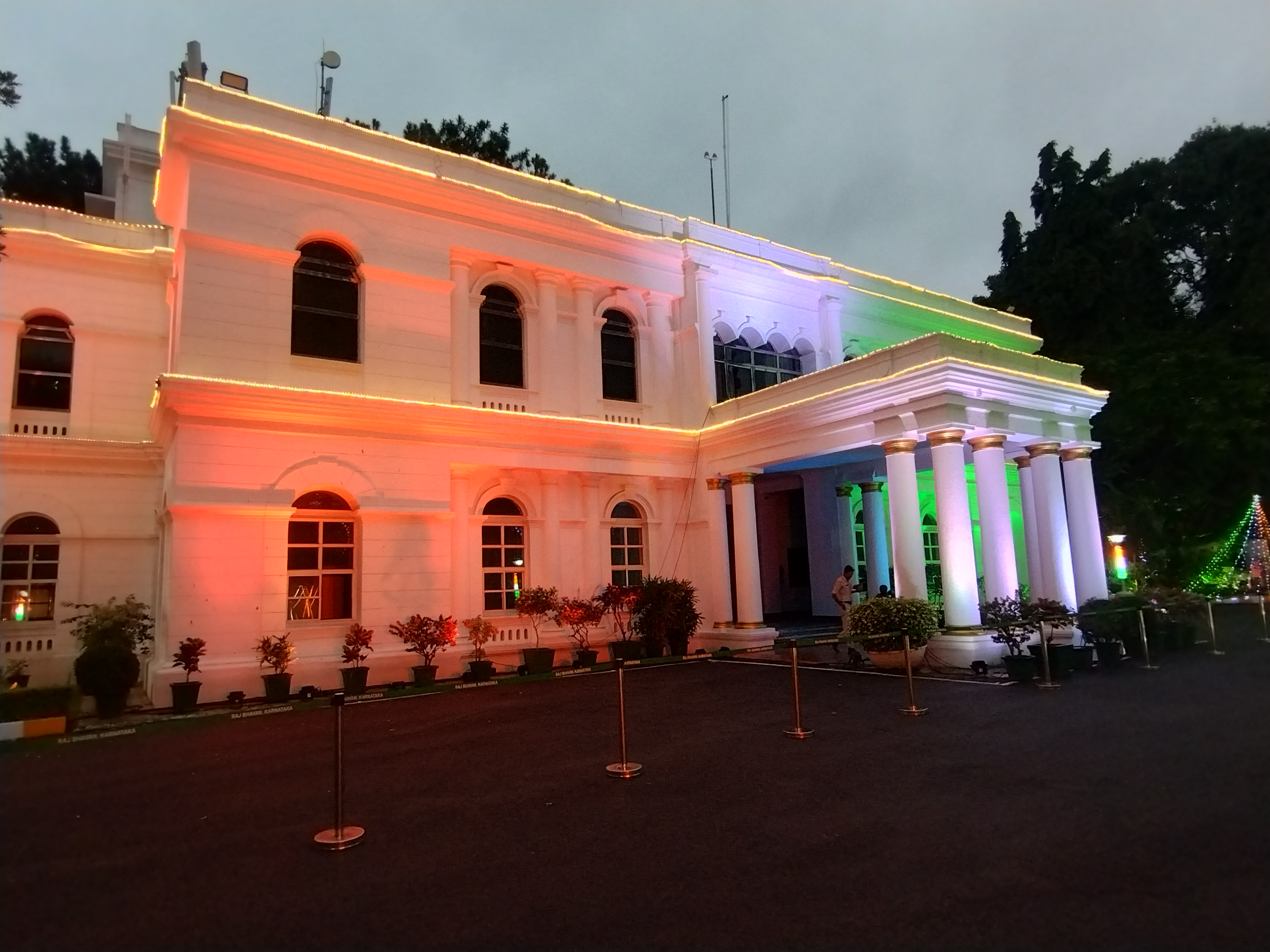

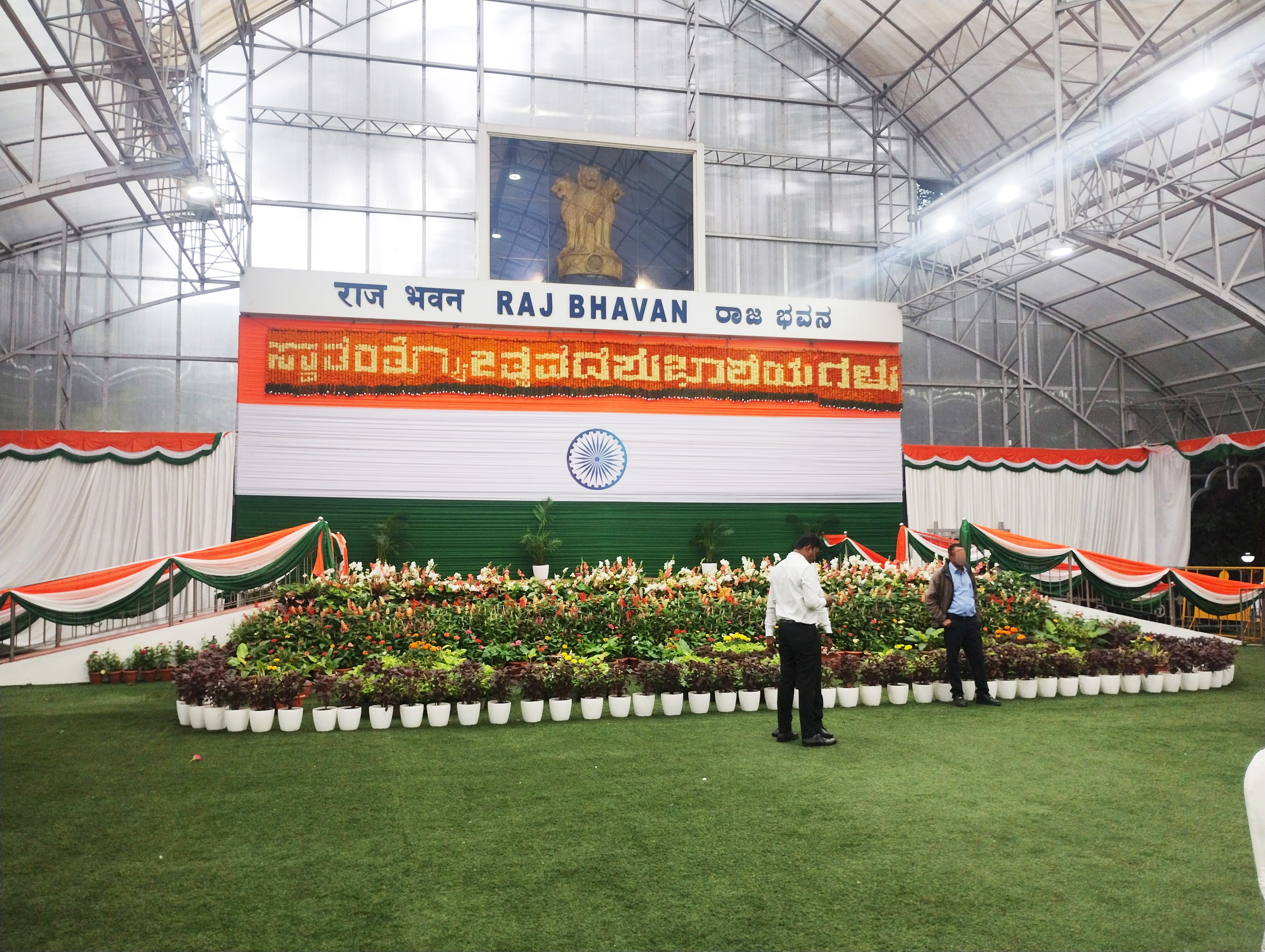
Lotus pond and gardens at Raj Bhavan, Bangalore
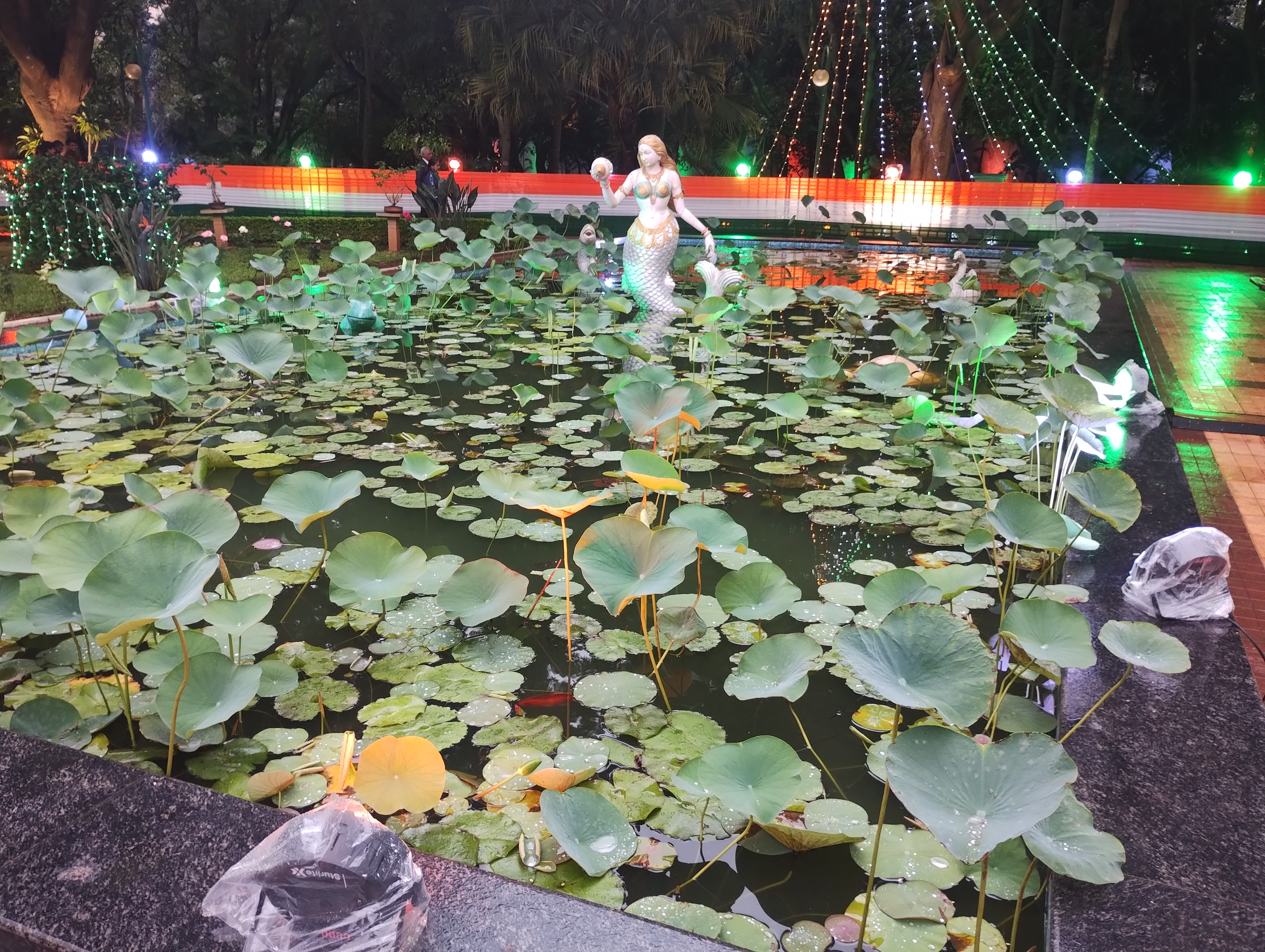

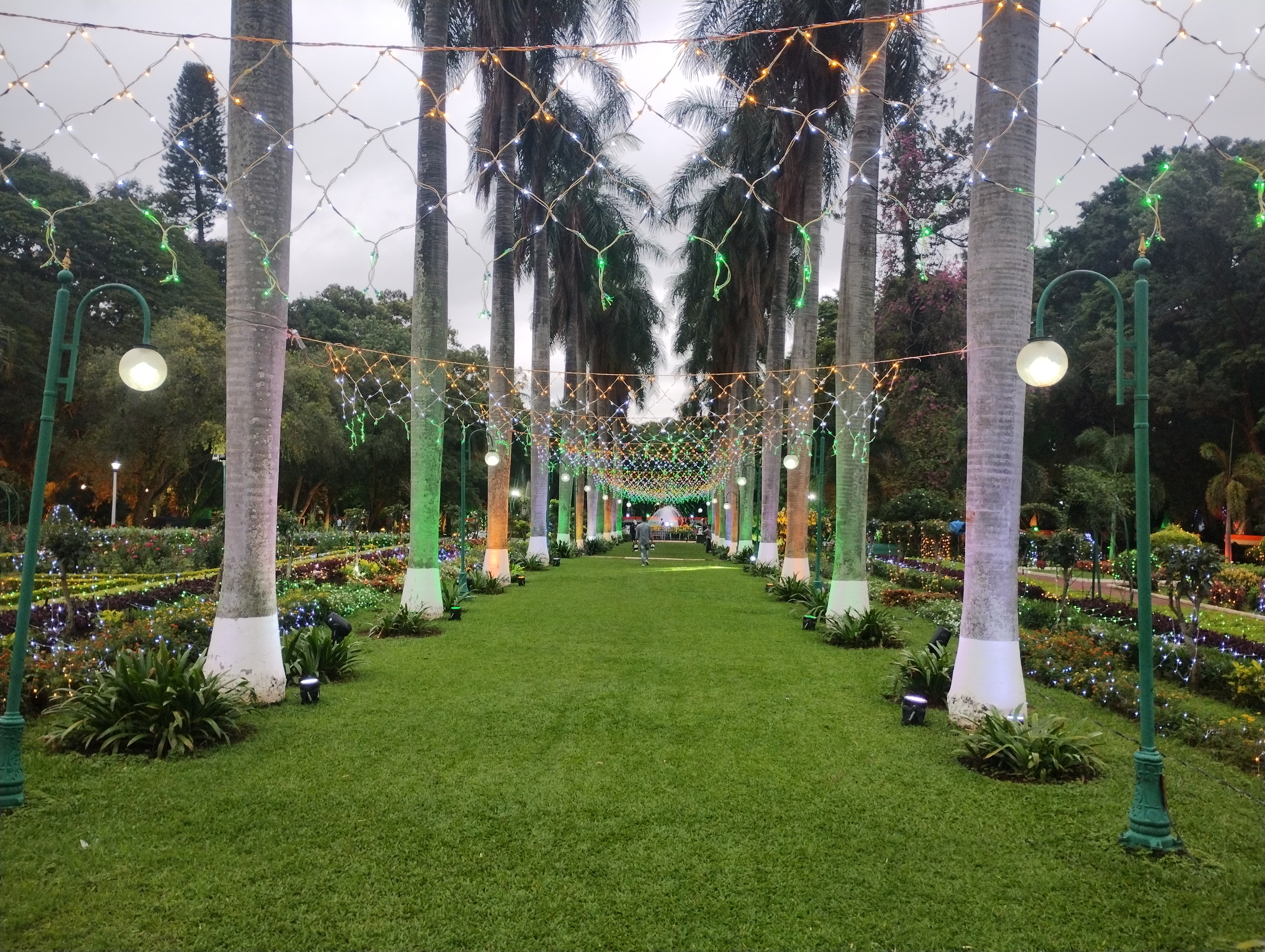

== See also ==
- Government Houses of the British Indian Empire
