= Shivajinagar, Bengaluru =

Shivajinagar
- Neighbourhood
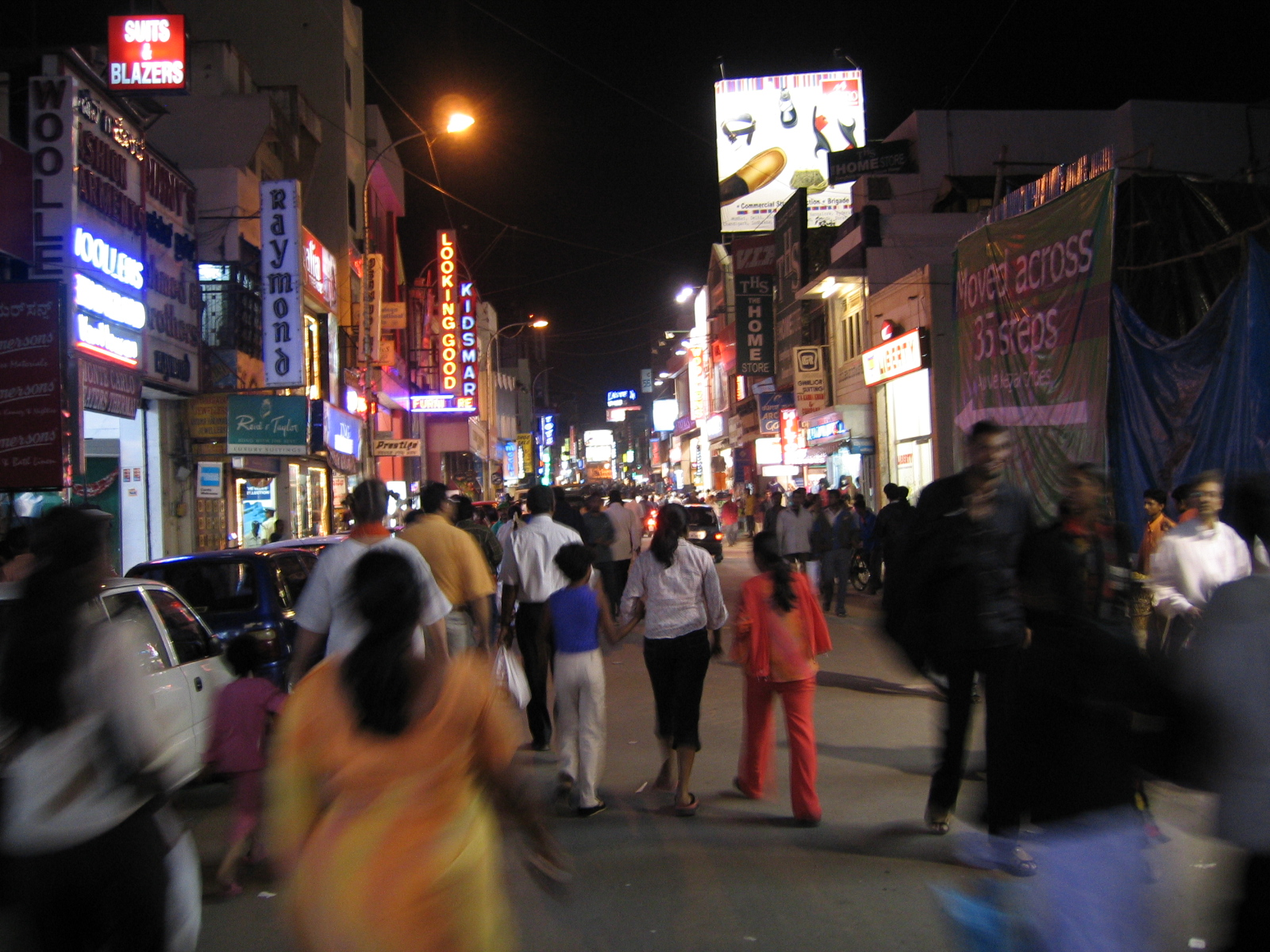
- Night view of Commercial street, adjoining area of Shivijainagar
- Nickname: Tasker Town
- Location within Bengaluru
- Coordinates: 12.99°N 77.60°E
- Country: India
- State: Karnataka
- City: Bengaluru

Government
  - Body: Bengaluru Central City Corporation

Languages
  - Official: Kannada,Tamil
- Time zone: UTC+5:30 (IST)
- Postal Index Number: 560051
- Lok Sabha Constituency: Bangalore Central

Shivajinagar, previously known as Blackpally and Tasker Town or Dandu, is a locality in Bengaluru, India located in the Central Business District. It was named after the 17th century Maratha Emperor Shivaji, by Shivaji Nagar two time independent Councillor Sri N R Murthy who was opposition leader, in the Bangalore City Corporation, in the year 1956.

== Overview ==
It is reported that nearly half of Shivajinagar's residents are Muslims, as such during Ramadan, visitors to the area gather to enjoy a wide array of culinary delights and cultural experiences. Large queues of visitors indulging in grill-charred kebabs, fried samosas, and large servings of falooda are seen. Families initiate their fast-breaking rituals with a spread of fresh fruits, dates, and beverages. The street fairs near Russell Market circle offer a rich variety of delicacies, including haleem, mutton samosas, kebabs, and phirni, attracting a significant number of visitors from both the city and its peripheral areas who seek to partake in the festivities and savor the local flavors.
