= M G Road, Bengaluru =

Road in Bangalore, India

Coordinates: 12.973801°N 77.611885°E

MG Road in 2026

Mahatma Gandhi Road also known as MG Road is a road in Bengaluru, India. It runs east from Trinity Circle at one end to Anil Kumble Circle at the other. Known as South Parade in pre-independence era, it was renamed as Mahatma Gandhi Road on 26 February 1948.

M. G. Road is also one of the busiest roads in the city and is lined on one side with retail stores, food outlets, restaurants and many more. It has many office buildings, shops and theatres. It is also a home to many buildings and banks. There are two Metro stations on M. G. Road, the eponymous station and Trinity.

Presently, the M.G Road Boulevard is being reconstructed after construction of the MG Road Metro station was completed and services launched on 20 October 2011. The Bengaluru Metro line that runs through MG Road, connects the eastern part of Bengaluru with the west.

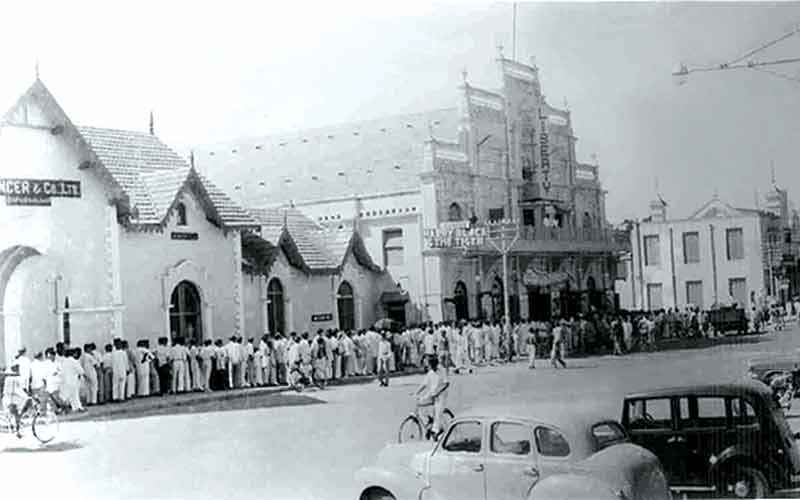
M.G. Road in 1950

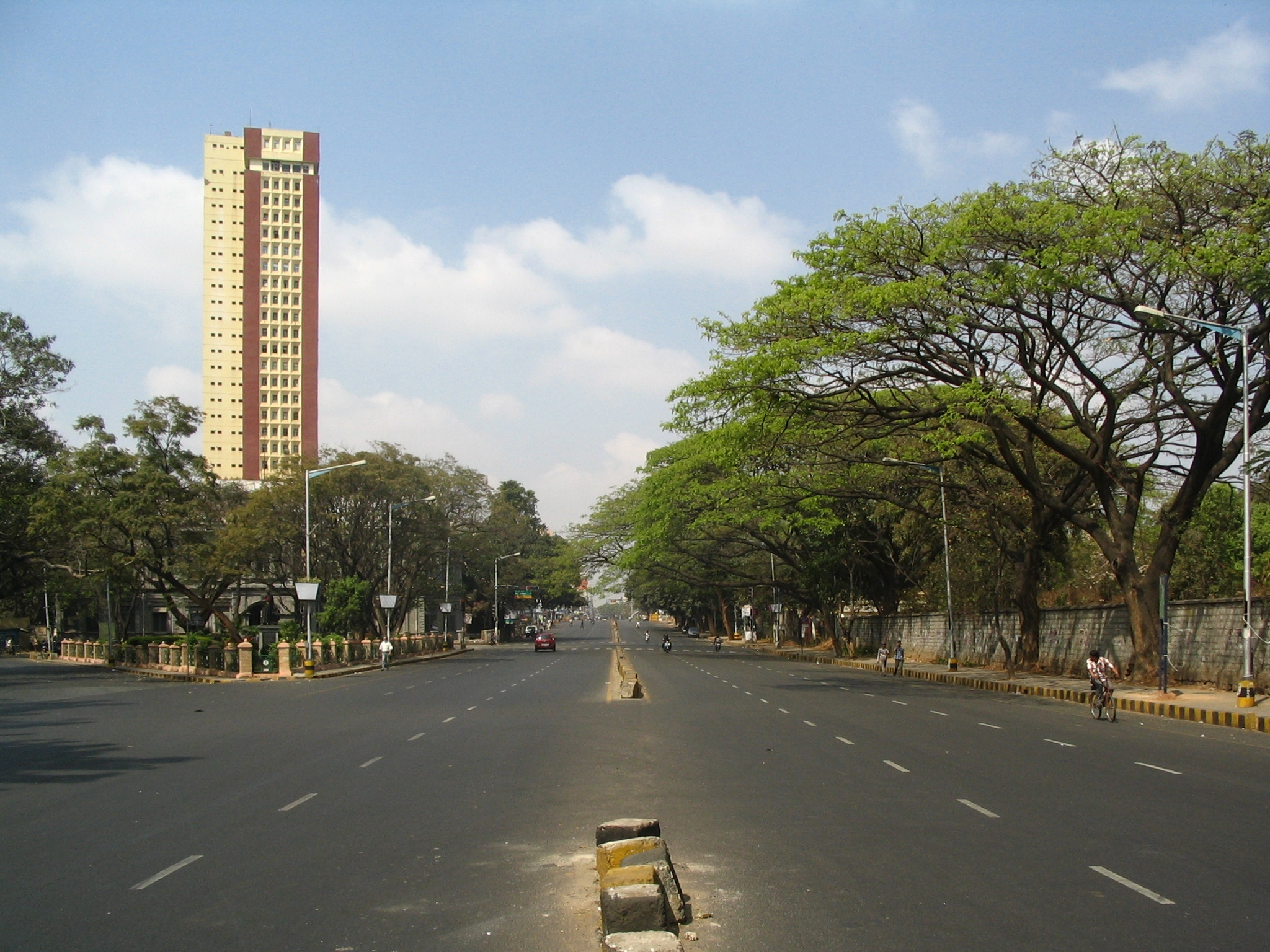
M.G. Road in 2007 before construction of metro rail

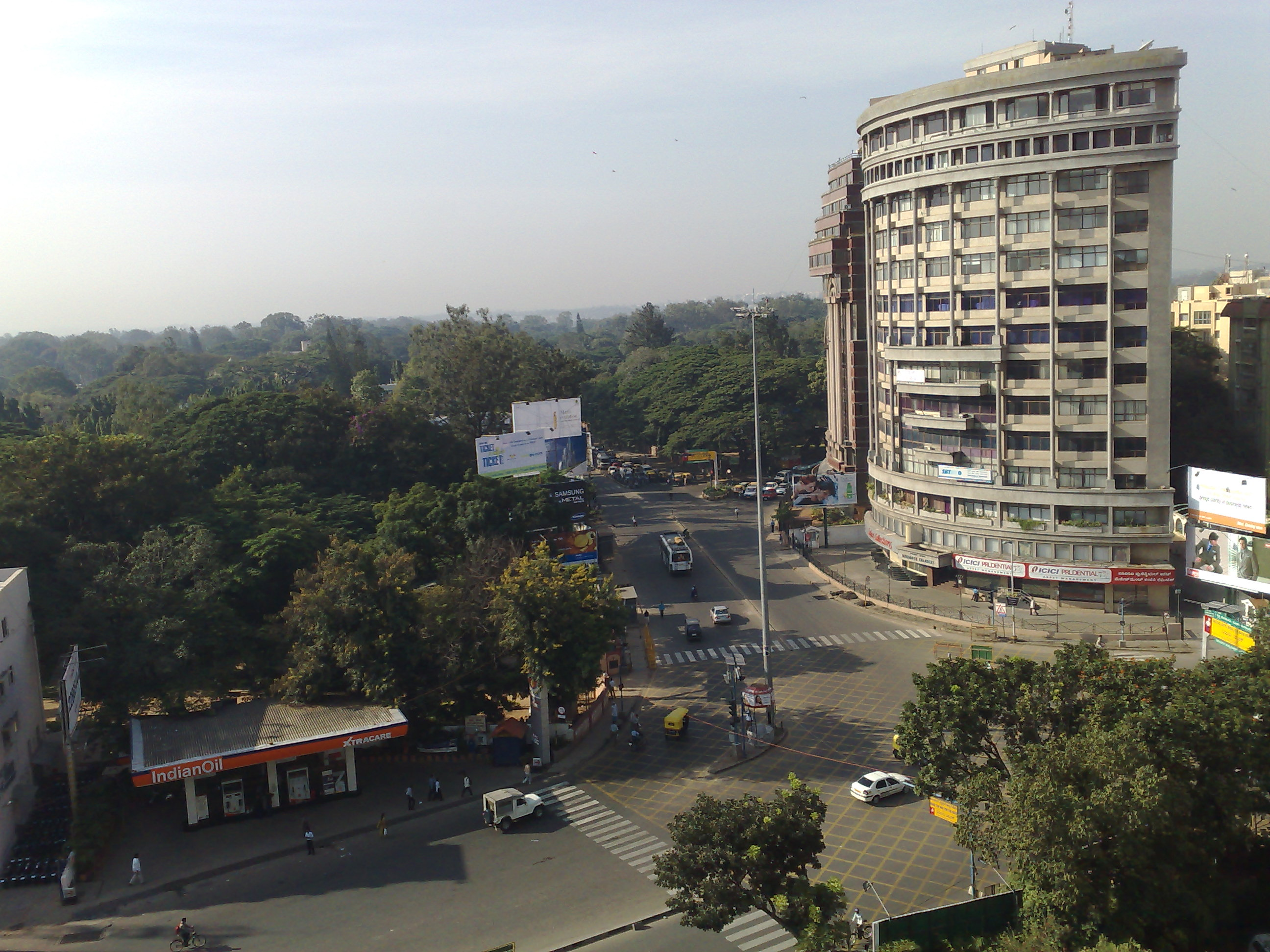
M.G. Road in 2007 as seen from Taj Residency Hotel

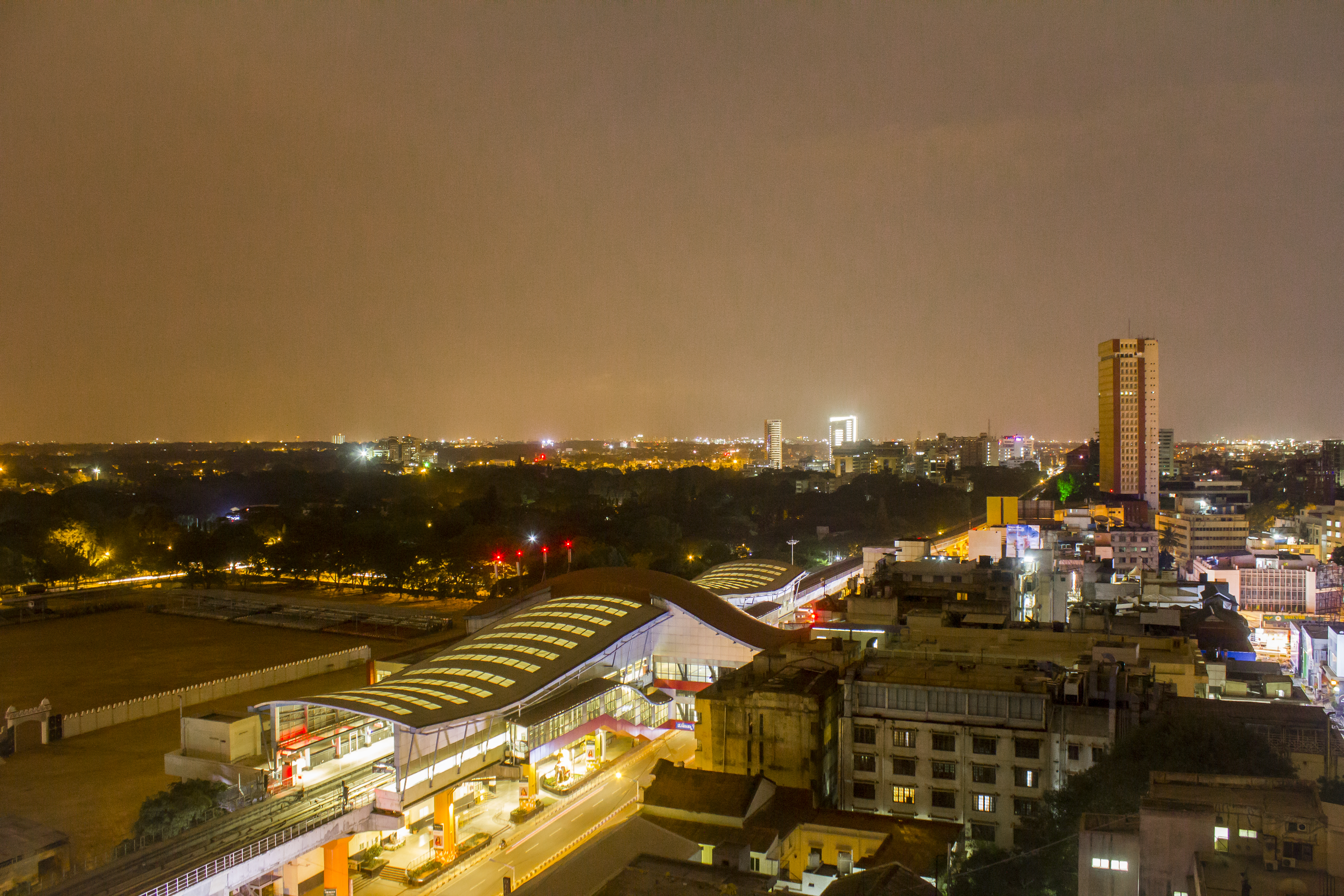
M.G. Road metro station in 2017

M.G. Road milestone in 2026

== See also ==
- Tourist attractions in Bangalore
- Mahatma Gandhi Road (Secunderabad)
- Brigade Road
