= List of areas in Bangalore Cantonment =

This is a list of areas in Bengaluru Cantonment, a military cantonment used during the British Raj in the 19th and early 20th century.

Old Colonial Names	Named after	Current Official Names	Named after
Austin Town	James Austin	Ferdinand Kittel Nagara	Ferdinand Kittel
Benson Town	P. H. Benson	Kadamba Nagara	Kadamba dynasty
Blackpally/Tasker Town		Shivajinagara	Chhatrapatí Shivaji Maharaj
Cleveland Town	John Wheeler Cleveland	Sri Krishnaraja Wadiyar Nagara	Sri Krishna Raja Wadiyar IV
Cooke Town	G. H. Cooke		
Cox Town	Alexander Ranken Cox	Sarvagnanagara	Sarvajna
Fraser Town/Mootocherry	Stuart Fraser	Pulakeshi Nagara	Pulakeshin I
Langford Town			
MacIver Town	L. J. MacIver	Shantala Nagara	Shantala Devi
Murphy Town/Knoxpete	W. H. Murphy	Hoysala Nagara	Hoysala Empire
Pottery Town	Potters from Madras		
Richards Town	F. J. Richards		
Richmond Town		Sir Mirza Ismail Nagara	Sir Mirza Ismail
St. Thomas Town		Benjamin Lewis Rice Nagara	Benjamin Lewis Rice
Tasker Town		Swami Shivanandapura	Swami Shivananda
Victoria Layout	Queen Victoria		
Williams Town		K Chengalaraya Reddy Nagara	K Chengalaraya Reddy
		Vasanth Nagar	
		Vivek Nagar	

== See also ==
- Bangalore Central Business District
