= Karnataka alcohol poisonings =

Karnataka liquor deaths are deaths in Karnataka state in India in 1981 by consuming illegal liquor. In July 1981 about 308 people died in Bangalore by illicit liquor. Adulteration of cheap liquor by methyl alcohol resulted in deaths.

Availability of cheap spurious alcohol (known as hooch) is a problem around the Tannery Road area of the Bangalore Cantonment, with many residents getting addicted. The bootlegger Marimuthu (who later became a councillor of BBMP) and Ameer Jan were running the operation. Hooch is brewed from industrial alcohol, by separating methyl alcohol and adding water – a risky process which can leave traces of poisonous methyl alcohol. The brew is a slow poison, damaging the kidney and intestines, leading to slow death.

On 7 July 1981, about 300 people (Official figures 229) around the Tannery Road area died as a result of consuming this spurious alcohol. Most of the victims were poor Dalits. Police registered cases against 63 people, but none were convicted or punished. An enquiry commission revealed a connection between some politicians and the bootleggers. A paltry sum of INR1000 (equivalent to INR22,300 in 2026; close to US$200) per family was paid to the victims by the Gundu Rao government.

== See also ==
- List of alcohol poisonings in India
