= Tannery Road =

- Road
- Location within Bengaluru
- Coordinates: 13.0049°N 77.6123°E
- Country: India
- State: Karnataka
- District: Bangalore Urban
- Metro: Bangalore

Government
  - Body: BBMP

Languages
  - Official: Kannada
  - Spoken: Kannada, Tamil, Urdu, English
- Time zone: UTC+5:30 (IST)
- PIN: 560005
- Lok Sabha Constituency: Bangalore Central
- Vidhan Sabha Constituency: Sarvagnanagar
- Original Planning Agency: Bangalore Civil & Military Station Municipal Commission
- Established: 1914

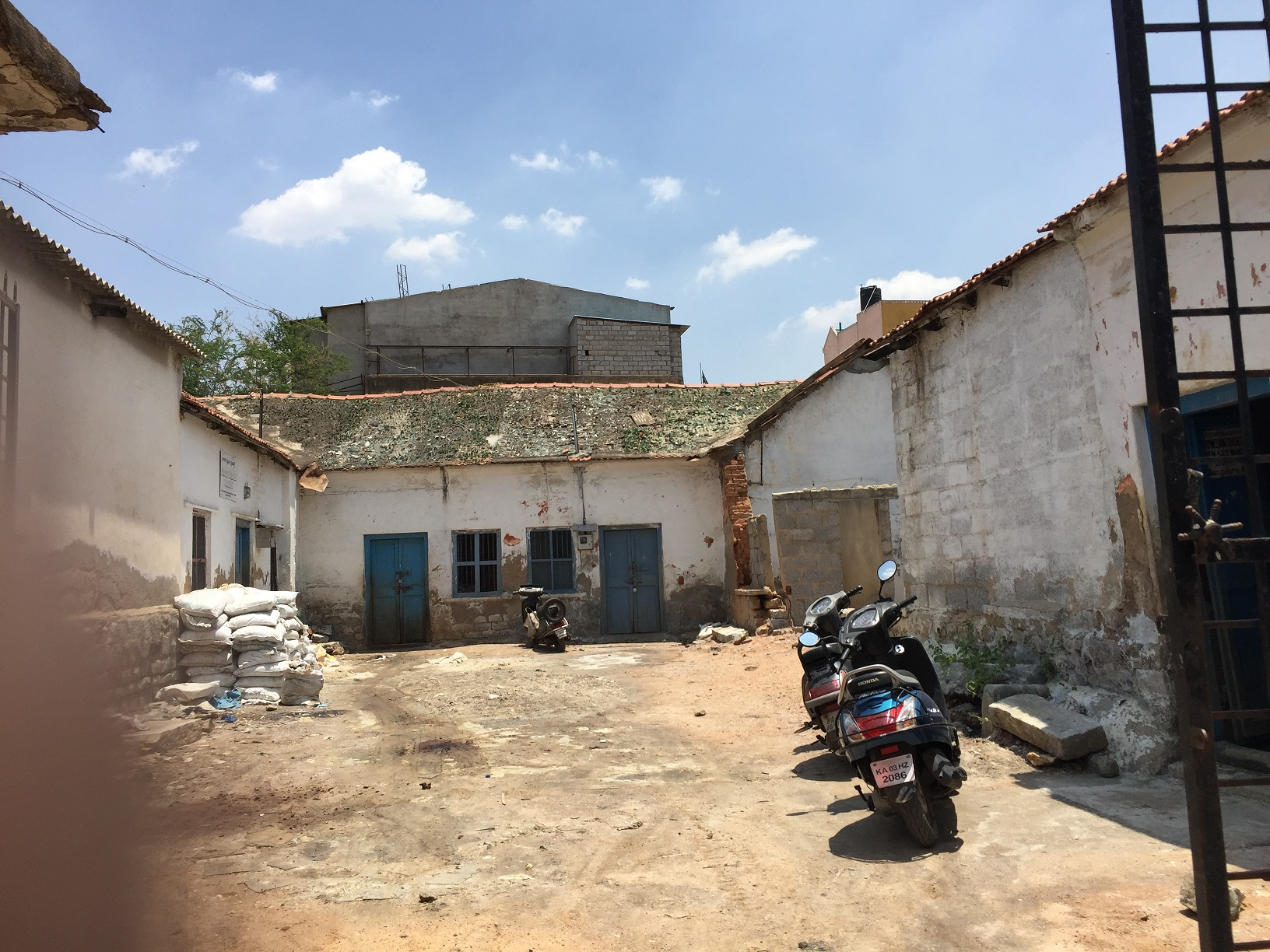
Tanneries at Tannery Road, Bangalore

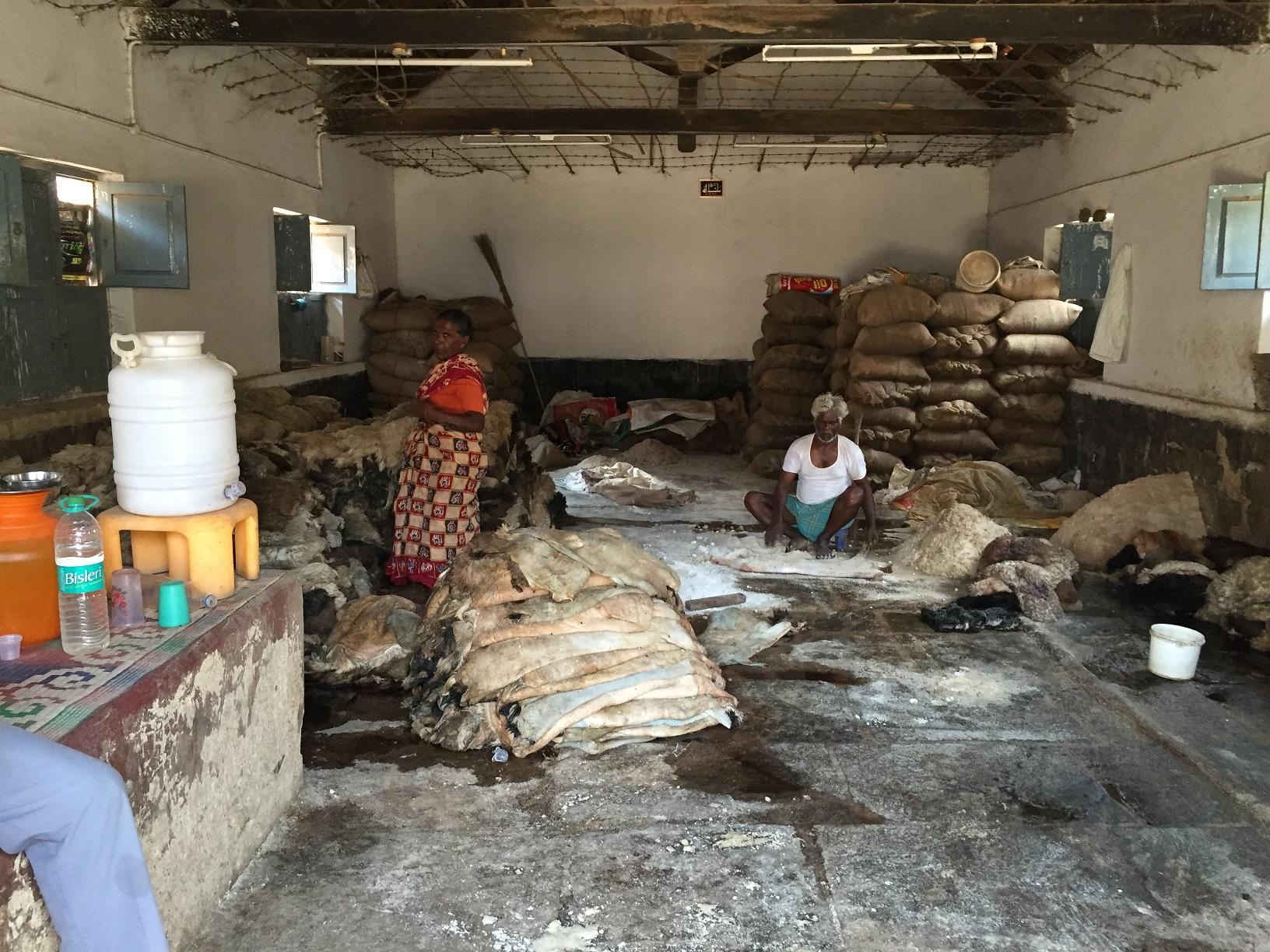
Inside a Tannery, Tannery Road, Bangalore

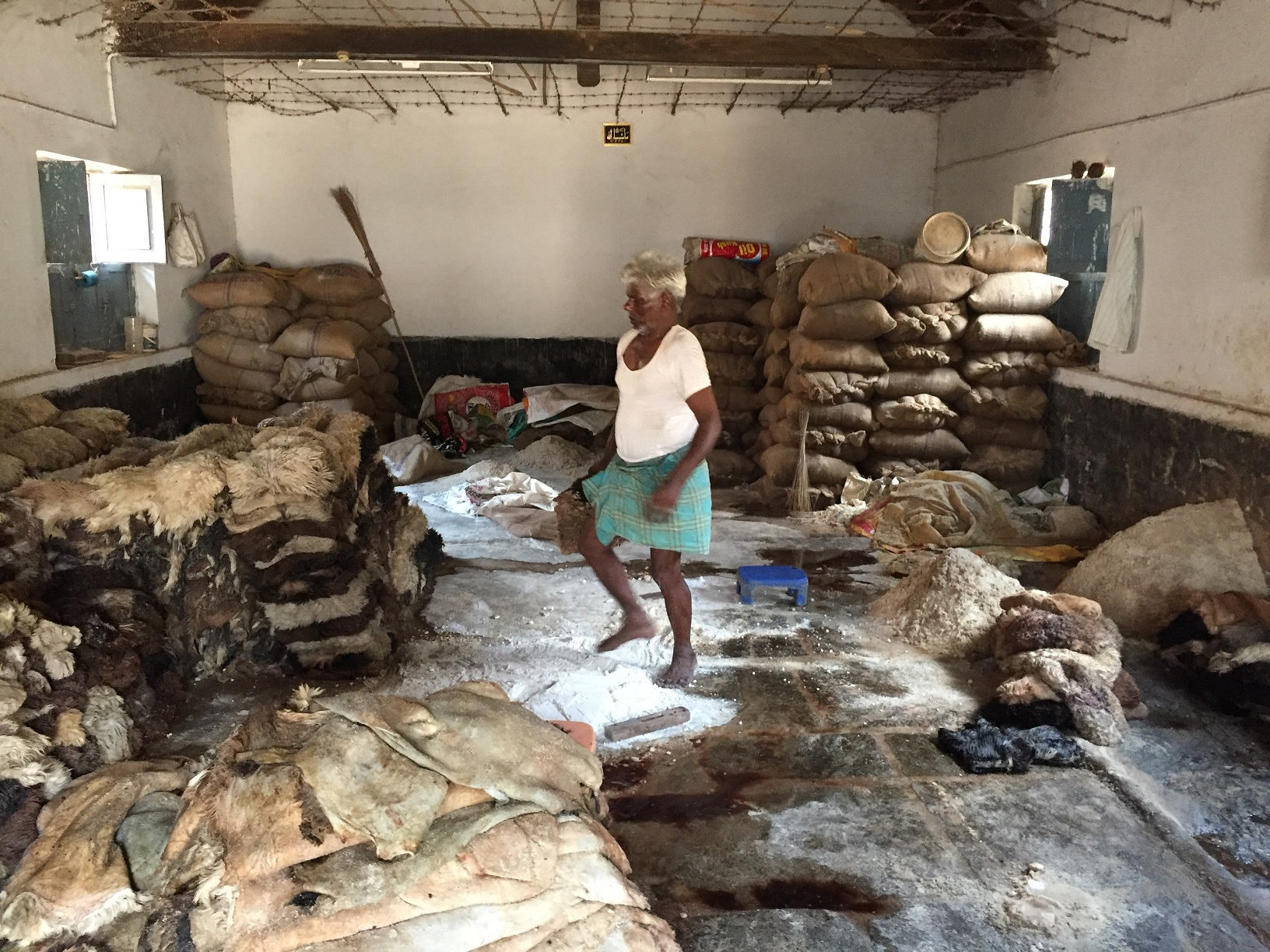
Tannery Worker, Tannery Road, Bangalore

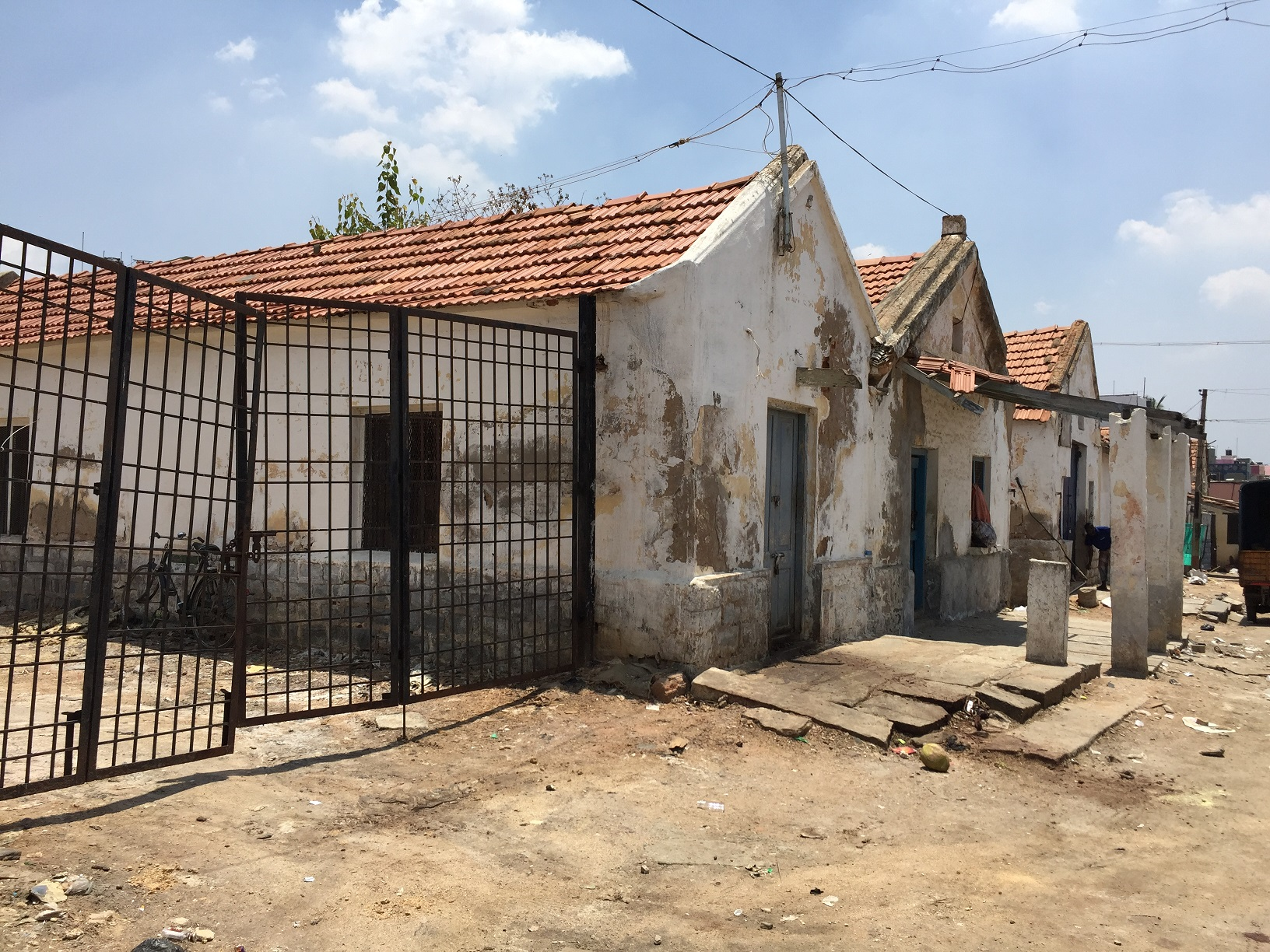
Abandoned Tanneries, Tannery Road, Bangalore

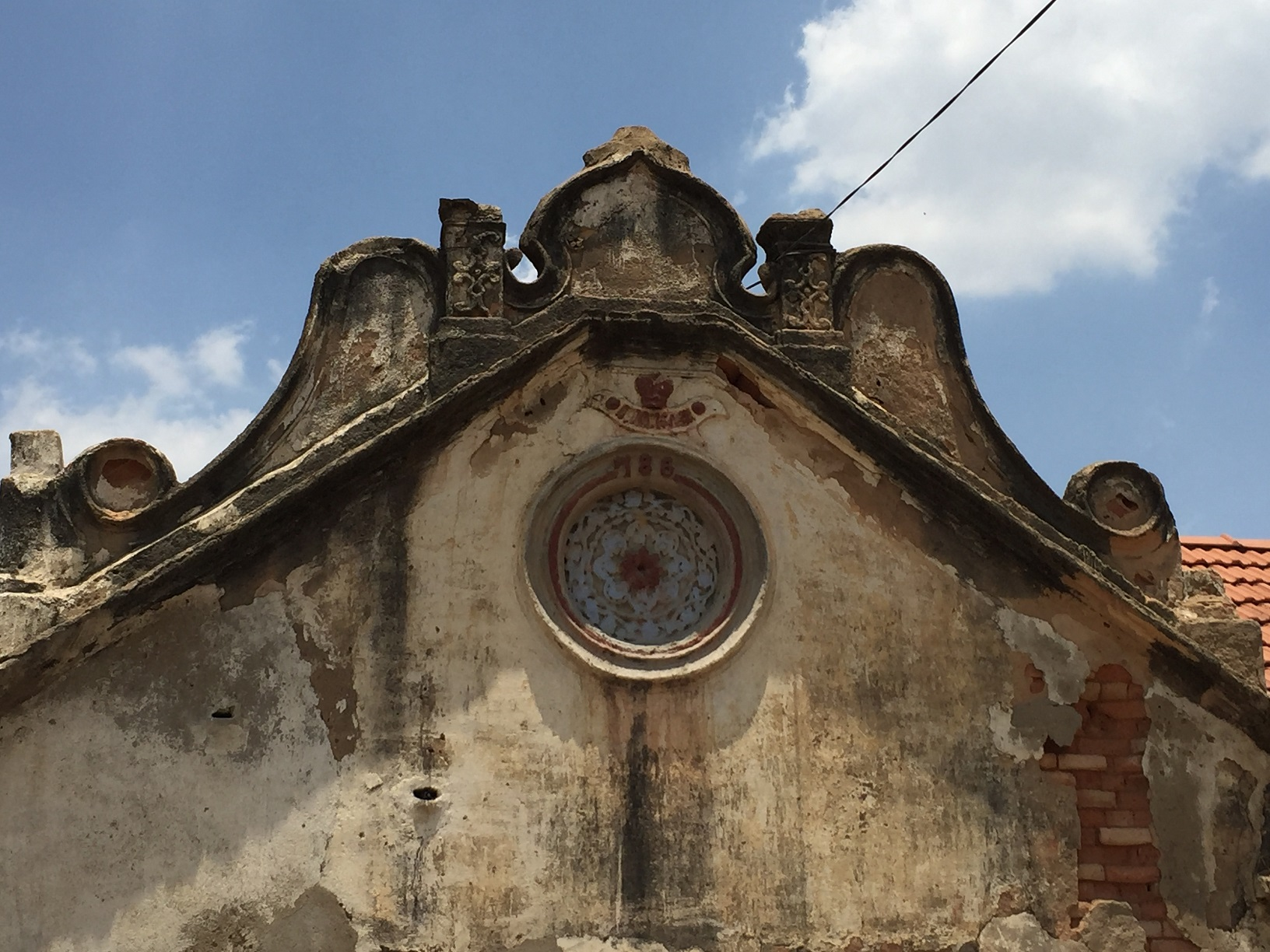
British Crown and 786 on Tannery Buildings, Tannery Road, Bangalore

Tannery Road is located in the North East of Bangalore Cantonment, India. It is a 4 km long narrow road (about 40 ft. wide) with around 700 shops, named after the tanneries of the British India period located at the end of the Road. Tannery Road was officially renamed as Dr B S Ambedkar Road many years back, but it still is referred to by its old name. Tannery Road touches Fraser Town, Richards Town, Giddappa Block, Periyar Nagar and Pillanna Garden. The Tannery Road area is highly populated with a high density. The suburb presents a picture which is a shocking contrast to the hi-tech image of Bangalore. As elections has not brought about any changes, the residents express disillusionment with politicians and politics. Pot-holes and broken pavements are a common feature of Tannery Road, in addition to heavy traffic, water problems, garbage, etc. There is scant respect for traffic rules, and vehicles of all types zoom past in all directions. Residents have to dodge puddles of dirty water and garbage, to move around.

== Tanneries ==
The tanneries were established during the British Raj, with the tanneries being located on the outskirts of the Bangalore Civil & Military Station, such that they were located at a 'safe'distance from the posh areas of the Bangalore Cantonment. Most of the buildings are 100 years or older, with some still carrying the insignia of the British Crown - the Lion and the Unicorn. The hides to the tanneries were and is still supplied by the slaughter house located at the beginning of Tannery Road. Gradually around 200 tannery units which have come up around the original tanneries set up in British India. In times gone by, people from the Tannery Road area were not allowed into the cantonment, and residents of the cantonment avoided Tannery Road.

Around 5000 Arunthathiyar, Tamil Dalit labourers were brought by the British from Madras Presidency districts of Vellore, Madurai and Tirunelveli. The Tanneries are owned by Muslims and the labour consists of Tamil Dalits, from the original migrants. The raw skin is initially cleaned using water, then rubbed with salt and folded into a square like a saree, and this preserves the skin for another 2 weeks. The hides are then transported to Vaniyambadi and Ambur, Tamil Nadu. In 2006, many of the tanneries and curing units were shut down, and now there are only about 15 left today. Most of the labourers have moved to other professions, and their children also getting good education. Tanners have also migrated in large numbers to Ambur and Vaniyambadi, as a result of the declining tannery industry in Bangalore. The government proposed the Karnataka Prevention of Slaughter and Preservation of Cattle Bill, which would have stopped the slaughter of cow/oxen, and would have struck the death knell to the tanneries. The Bill was however withdrawn by the strong Congress Government.

== Slaughterhouse ==
The slaughterhouse (called as Doddi by the locals in Tamil/Urdu) is located at the beginning of Tannery Road, at the intersection of Pottery Road. It was established during British India, and is one of the few slaughterhouses in India, when cows/ox are slaughtered. It has an installed capacity of slaughtering 50 big animals and 200 small animals. However, at least 150 big and 500 small animals are slaughtered every day. The wastage is illegally dumped into the storm water drain located next to the slaughter house, causing issues of pollution and bad stench in the neighbouring areas. The slaughterhouse has been subject to many litigations, and recently Justices Cyriac Joseph and Ashok B in response to a public interest litigation (PIL) ordered the slaughterhouse be moved to Iblur, city outskirts. In June 2009, the Karnataka Pollution Control Board refused to renew the licence of the slaughterhouse as the effluent treatment plant was not in operation. An investigation by Indian Institute of Journalism & New Media found children aged 11–15 years working at the slaughterhouse, with the butchers saying that they were unable to afford providing education to their children, and hence had them helping out in the slaughterhouse.

== Residents of Tannery Road ==
Most of the residents of Tannery Road are Tamil-speaking Hindus and Christians, and Urdu-speaking Muslims. There are also small number of Marwari traders running businesses on Tannery Road. Majority of residents are low-income group and labourers. Poor, under-privileged Muslims live in enclaves of Tannery Road, particularly around D J Halli.

Tannery Road is covered with cut-outs, cardboard arches and wall murals of BR Ambedkar, Thiruvalluvar, Mother Teresa, Subhas Chandra Bose, Bhagat Singh, etc.

Political activity is intense, which according to some residents has a detrimental effect on Tannery Road's woes. Other feel that lack of education results in the lack of effective implementation of the rule of law. Older residents moan that even though the area was only 7 km from Vidhana Soudha, it was hundreds of km away from effective governance.

There is a statue of BR Ambedkar, on Tannery Road, which often serves as venue for political meetings and protests. An annual Ganesh idol immersion procession passes through Tannery Road during the festival of Vinayaka Chaturthi, with the procession stopping near the statue of BR Ambedkar to pay its respects.

== Crime ==
Tannery Road is classified as a 'sensitive' area, due to several communal flare-ups, with Police deployed during festivals, political rallies, and even India - Pakistan cricket matches. Some of the notorious history sheeters of the area are Marimuthu and Elumalai. Marimuthu runs the hootch business, and is the only woman in Bangalore Police rowdy sheet. She went on to be elected as BBMP councillor on a JD(S) ticket in 2000 and 2005, but however lost the 2010 elections to V Palaniyammal sister of her rival and notorious rowdy Elumamalai (contesting on Congress ticket). The Muslim underworld also has a presence around the Tannery Road area.

Availability of cheap spurious alcohol, (known as hooch) is a problem around the Tannery Road area, with many dwellers getting addicted. Notorious bootlegger (who later became a councillor of BBMP) and Ameer Jan were running the racket. Hootch is brewed from industrial alcohol, by separating Methyl Alcohol, and adding water - A dangerous process which can leave traces of poisonous Methyl Alcohol. The brew is slow poison, damaging kidney and intestines, leading to slow death. On 7 July 1981, about 300 people (Official figures 229) around the Tannery Road area died as a result of consuming this spurious alcohol. Most of the victims were poor Dalits. Police registered cases against 63 people, but none were convicted or punished. An enquiry commission revealed a connection between some politicians and the bootleggers. A paltry sum of INR 1000 per family was paid to the victims by the Gundu Rao government.

== Present state ==
In 2009 the Bruhat Bangalore Mahanagara Palike (BBMP) has a project to widen Tannery Road, from the present 40 ft. to 80 ft.. However, there is stiff opposition by the traders of Tannery Road. According to Vijayraj, President of the Tannery Road Merchants’ Association, most of the owners of the 700 shops are opposed to the project. Further, they wanted the upcoming Bangalore Metro project to go underground in the Tannery Road stretch. In December 2009, the BBMP demolished 690 properties on Tannery Road, in the face of stiff opposition of the traders, offering a TDR of INR 3000 per square feet.

Tannery Road is one of the proposed stations on the Gottigere-Nagavara line of the Bangalore Metro Project, Phase 2. Further, according to Pradeep Singh Kharola, MD of BMRC, problems were expected in implementing the Bangalore Metro Phase 2 project in densely populated Tannery Road.

The suburb residents face problems of drinking water, with people having to buy water from private suppliers, and problems with garbage collection and disposal. Recently Tannery Road, along with surrounding suburbs of KG Halli, DJ Halli, has emerged as centre for illegal recycling of hazardous e-waste.

The David Rattray Memorial Trust runs the Hope Foundation School, and English Medium School for the impoverished children living in the slums around Tannery Road. The children of the tannery workers are also embracing English Medium School, with many studying in Universities and surrounding colleges.

== Landmarks ==
- Masjid E Hazrath Bilal * Hazarat Mastani Ma Darga
- Anand Theatre
- Eidgah-e-Jadeed
- D J Halli Police Station
- Skin and Salt Mandi
