= Bangalore East =

Bangalor East may refer to:

- Bangalore East railway station
- Bangalore East (Taluk)
