= Binnamangala =

Binnamangala may refer to several places in or near Bangalore, Karnataka, India:

- Binnamangala, Bangalore, a neighborhood in Bangalore
- Binnamangala Manavarthe Kaval or BM Kaval, former village and present neighborhood in Bangalore
- Binnamangala, Doddaballapur, a village in Devanahalli Taluk, Bangalore Rural district
- Binnamangala, Nelamangala, a former village, now included in Nelamangala Town, Bangalore Rural district
- Binnamangala, Sidlaghatta, a village in Sidlaghatta Taluk, Chikkaballapur district

== See also ==
- Arebinnamangala, a village in Bangalore North Taluk, Bangalore Urban district
