= Murphy Town, Bengaluru =

Murphy Town Knoxpete
- Neighbourhood
- Hoysala Nagara
- Location within Bengaluru
- Coordinates: 12.9798°N 77.6265°E
- Country: India
- State: Karnataka
- District: Bengaluru Urban
- Metro: Bengaluru

Government
  - Body: Bengaluru Central City Corporation

Languages
  - Official: Kannada
  - Spoken: Kannada, Tamil, English
- Time zone: UTC+5:30 (IST)
- PIN: 560008
- Vehicle registration: KA 01
- Lok Sabha Constituency: Bangalore Central
- Vidhan Sabha Constituency: C V Raman Nagar
- Original Planning Agency: Bangalore Civil & Military Station Municipal Commission

Murphy Town, officially Hoysala Nagara and historically referred to as Knoxpete is a suburb located near Bangalore Cantonment, India. It is one of the oldest planned suburbs of the Cantonment, and was earlier known as Knoxpete, and was later changed to Hoysala Nagar. It is located North of Halasuru, with Murphy Road running along its periphery, and is also bounded by Old Madras Road and Kensington Road, with part of Kensington Road overlooking Halasuru Lake Madras Sappers.

== Knoxpete ==
In the early 1900s the suburb was known as Knoxpete, named after Lt. Col. Stuart George Knox, who served as Resident of Mysore and Coorg between 1 November 1921 to 31 October 1922, and earlier as Resident of Baroda State. The suburb was settled since 1865 by Tamil workers such as tannery workers, leather workers, pottery workers, etc. The houses at Knoxpete had poor sanitation facilities and generally poorly built, and resembled a slum. The Bangalore Plague of 1898, resulted in the government deciding to demolish, rebuild and re-settle the suburb. However actual process was started only in 1923. In 1937, the suburb was renamed as Murphy Town, after W H Murphy, MBE - Executive Engineer, Municipal Council, Bangalore Civil and Military Station.

== W H Murphy ==
W H Murphy, served as the Executive Engineer, Municipal Council, Bangalore Civil and Military Station for nearly 25 years. Murphy is credited with designing the sanitation works at Ferdinand Kittel Nagara, and the underground drainage works at Shivajinagara. He is responsible for designing and execution of some of Bangalore Cantonment's prominent buildings, such as Russell Market, which is named after T B Russell who served as Municipal Commissioner, Bangalore. He also designed and built the Friend In Need Society and Colonel Hill High School, with buildings known as Cobb Home for the Aged (after H V Cobb, Resident of Mysore) and Girdlestone Nursing Home (after C E R Girdlestone, Resident of Mysore), inaugurated W P Barton (British Resident). Murphy was also credited with inventing the Dog Electrocute, which was used to kill stray dogs painlessly, and extensively used in the Bangalore Cantonment since November 1925. Murphy was also one of the founding members of the Rotary Club of Bangalore (founded 27 October 1934).

== Town plan ==
Cantonment records indicate that 310 single homes and 108 double homes were built, with cement, bricks and Mangalore tiles. There were large open quadrangles, and the houses were around its periphery, and these open spaces provided space for community and social functions. Space was also provided for Temples, Churches and a Market The housing scheme at Hoysala Nagara was based on three defining principles. Firstly, the houses should be 'too good for the classes that occupy them' - the intention was to people to grain self-respect. Secondly, 'the dull uniformity of barracks' must not be implemented - as it proved to be a hindrance to social elevation. Finally, the houses were built with scope for further expansion if economic conditions improved.

The Houses had postal addresses named as "SQUARE" (instead of Lane, Street or Cross) based on 9 numbers of the Squares consisting of Houses making it a Proper square, with Each of the "SQUARE" having a playground for recreational use of the Residents (Hence you see the locality producing so many National level Footballers & Hockey Players even till date).

== Residents of Hoysala Nagara ==
Like in other suburbs of the Bangalore Cantonment, Hoysala Nagara has a large Tamil population with Kannada & Telugu speaking Residents too. They trace their ancestry to the large number of Tamil soldiers, suppliers and workers who were brought into the Bangalore Civil and Military Station, by the British Army, after the fall of Tippu Sultan.It is said that half of the Tamil soldier ancestors of the Hoysala Nagara residents were from The Madras Sappers. Hoysala Nagara along with other suburbs of the Bangalore Cantonment was directly under the administration of the British Madras Presidency till 1949, when it was handed over to the Mysore State.

Like other poverty stricken areas of the world, Hoysala Nagara, along with Ferdinand Kittel Nagara has produced many good football players, with the sport being very popular in the suburb. This town has produced national & international Hockey players, coaches. Even today Free Football & Hockey coaching is conducted for kids. Primrose Hockey Club One of the Oldest Private Hockey clubs in Karnataka was started here in 1959. There are some 37 houses in Hoysala Nagara where the residents pay a nominal rent to BBMP, with the rates staying low as fixed by the British Authorities of the erstwhile Bangalore Cantonment. After independence, the residents met Murphy to get ownership papers, however these 37 houses were left without proper land papers. According to residents, they are still looked down as immigrants by government departments, even though they have been living in Bangalore than most other people in the city. The Street names in Hoysala Nagara are named after Mudaliars, who were prominent businessmen in the community. The Town Government School had produced several IAS officers, doctors, engineers, scientists, politicians, and teachers. Former municipal councillor Shri Bhaskaran was elected several times as councillor and was honorary deputy mayor of Bangalore. Under his guidance hundreds of old Hoysala Nagara residents got B.D.A sites in Indira Nagar and neighborhood areas, many moved away to these new development areas( but they do a mandatory customary annual visit to celebrate Ulsoor pallike with their relatives & friends),

The local school bearing the plaque ‘1913 Elementary School’, used to a Tamil Medium School, which has now been converted to Kannada Medium. The school has an old dilapidated building called the 'Evelyn Barton Welfare Centre’, which has since been closed as it's too dangerous. According to the Principal of the School, local residents prefer to give their children English Medium Education from the numerous other schools nearby.

The Hoysala Nagara Market is known for its Meat shops selling Chicken, Mutton, Beef and Fish. One of the shops in the Hoysala Nagara Market, VM Stores is 100 years old, and is one of the oldest stores in the Market. Most of the shops 8x10 ft2, and the rent is minimal at INR 110. However, if a shop ownership is transferred, then the rent gets increased to INR 1000.

== Present state ==
In November 2014, the Bruhat Bengaluru Mahanagara Palike's (BBMP) decided to raze 18 old markets (including Hoysala Nagara Market). This move has been opposed by heritage lovers, INTACH Bangalore and other groups. A campaign was being led by Kiran Natarajan, Bangalore's well known architect to stop the demolition of heritage markets.

In 1998, the BBMP renamed Murphy Town as Hoysala Nagar, after an ancient Kingdom which ruled the Deccan.

== Landmarks of Hoysala Nagara ==
- Good Shepherd Church (New Church was built in place of the Old Church during early part of 2000)
- Hoysala Nagara Market
- Hoysala Nagara Government School
- Many Hindu Temples built around the 1940s and 1950s still exist.
- Chariots Festival of Hindu Local Deities taken on Procession during Flower Bloom season in April month.
- Hoysala Nagara Play Ground (also called as Police Ground or Ambedkar Play Ground)

== See also ==
- Pulakeshi Nagara
- Sarvagnanagara
- Ferdinand Kittel Nagara
- Cooke Town
