= Plaza Theatre (Bengaluru) =

- Plaza Theatre in Bangalore
- Interactive map of Plaza Theatre
- Address: M.G Road; Bangalore; India
- Coordinates: 12.9751°N 77.606°E
- Current use: Metro Station

Construction
- Opened: 1936
- Closed: 2005
- Years active: 1936-2005

Plaza was a film theatre located in the city of Bangalore, India. It used to be on M. G. Road in the Bangalore Cantonment area. It was built in 1936 and mostly screened Hollywood movies.

== History ==
Arcot Narrainswamy Mudaliar was a contractor who built many buildings in Bengaluru including the Attara Kacheri (the present premises of the Karnataka High Court). From the money he earned out of it, he purchased a number of properties on M. G. Road including a 17,000 sq ft (1,600 m^{2}) property over which the Plaza theatre was eventually built. His grandsons, A. S. Krishnamoorthy and Rajamanickam Velu wanted to construct a film theatre on this property, where they were formerly running a furniture business and went to Great Britain to understand how a great film theatre should look like. They came back and constructed Plaza theatre in the year 1936 modeling it after the Piccadilly Circus in London. The first film to be screened here was The Broadway Melody in April 1936. The theatre also had a wooden dance floor which was used by British soldiers for ball dancing. Initial ticket prices ranged from eight annas for the front seats to 1 rupee and 12 annas for the balcony's highest seat, called The Dress Circle. The theatre also had a bar which served drinks to patrons who came to watch movies.

== Movies ==
Movies that have been screened here include Hans Christian Andersen, The Court Jester, Artists and Models and The Ten Commandments. The latter ran for 44 straight weeks making it the longest running movie in the theatre. Loads of school children were brought to the theatre to watch this movie and a special personal screening of the movie was arranged in the year 1959 for the Maharaja of Mysore, Jayachamarajendra Wodeyar and his entourage. Initially, the theatre was associated with MGM Studios screening movies like Gone with the Wind before moving on to Paramount pictures to screen movies like Roman Holiday, An Officer and a Gentleman and the James Bond movies.

== Closure ==
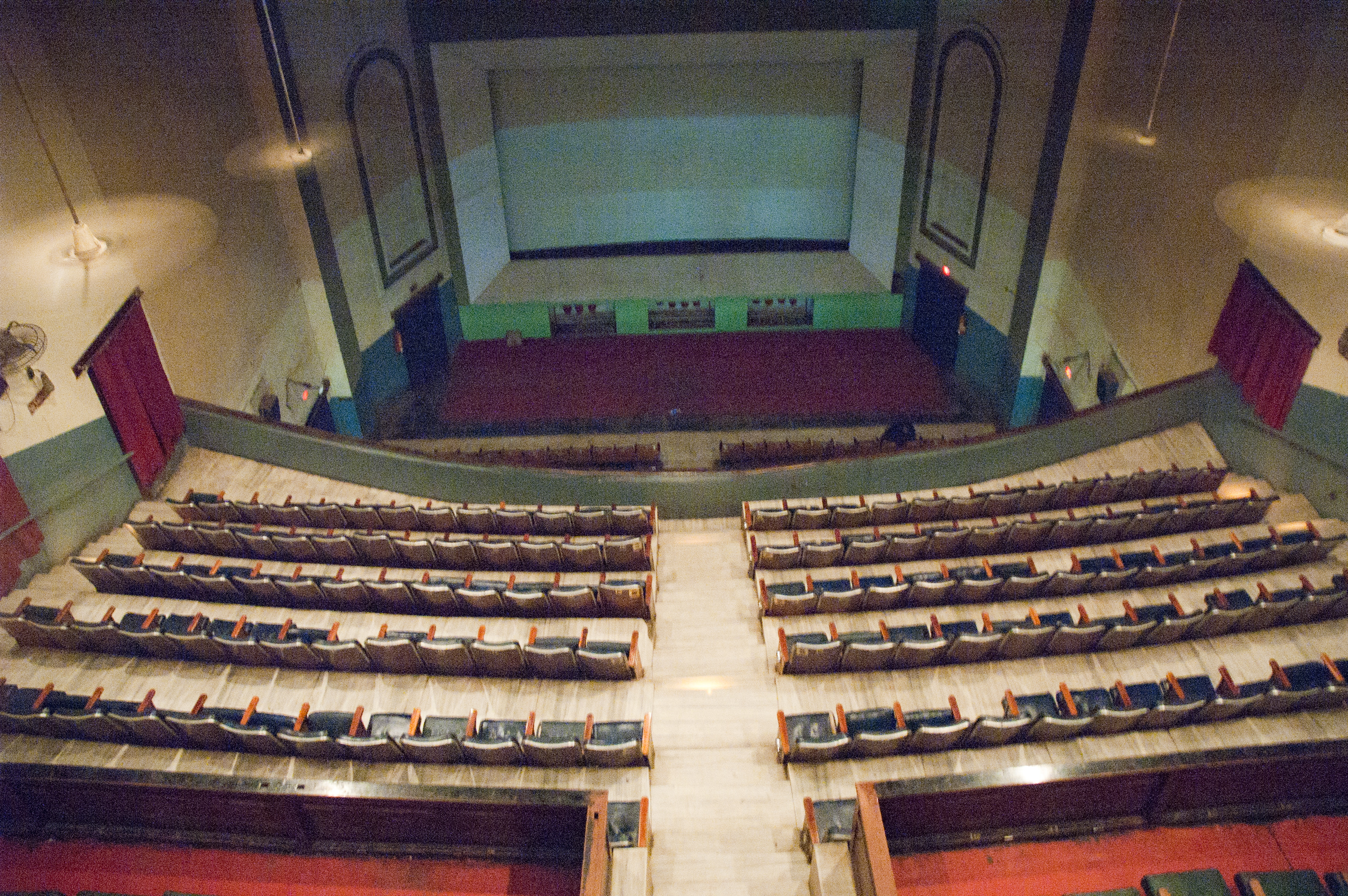
View from projection room on closing day

The last film that was screened here was Meet the Fockers on 17 March 2005. The Narrain family sold the theatre since their children, all professionals, did not wish to carry on the family business. A mining investor from Ballari purchased this property and wanted to build a shopping mall in its place. However, the Bruhat Bengaluru Mahanagara Palike refused permission to build a shopping mall. The land has since been acquired for the Namma Metro project and today houses the Mahatma Gandhi Road metro station on the Purple Line.
