= Bangalore Cantonment =

Military quarters in Bangalore, India

The Bangalore Cantonment (1806–1881) was a cantonment of the British Raj based in the Indian city of Bangalore. The cantonment covered an area of 13 square miles (34 km^{2}), extending from the Residency on the west to Binnamangala on the east and from the Tanneries on Tannery Road in the north to AGRAM (Army Group Royal Artillery Maidan - Maidan meaning Ground) in the south. By area, it was the largest British military cantonment in South India. The British garrison stationed in the cantonment included three artillery batteries, and regiments of the cavalry, infantry, sappers, miners, mounted infantry, supply and transport corps and the Bangalore Rifle Volunteers. The Bangalore Cantonment was directly under the administration of the British Raj, while Bangalore City itself was under the jurisdiction of the Durbar of the Kingdom of Mysore.

== History and Layout ==
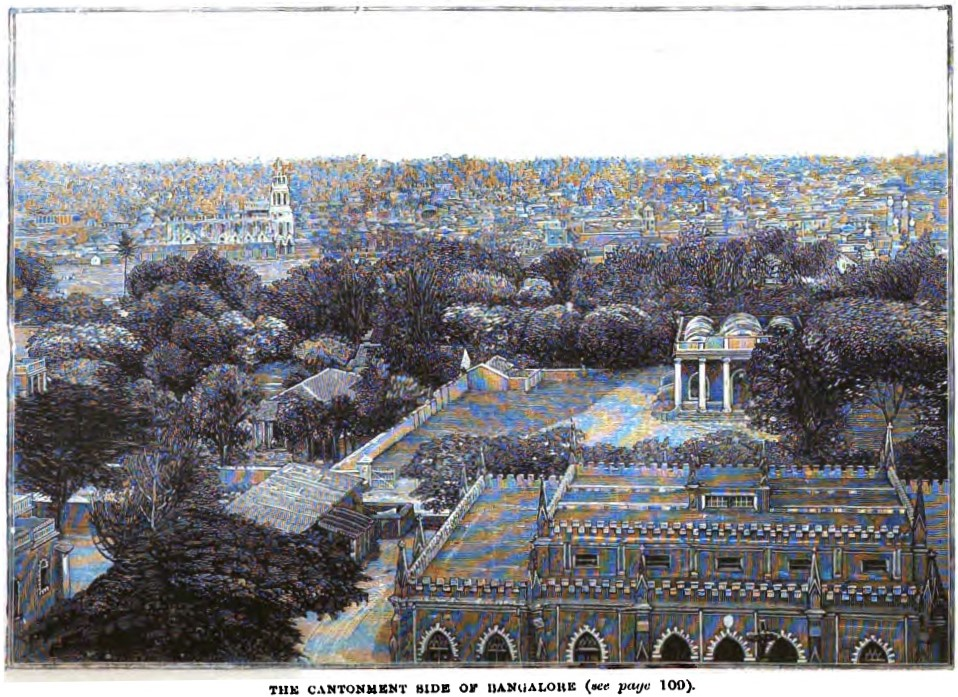
The Cantonment Side of Bangalore (p.98, 1890), London Missionary Society

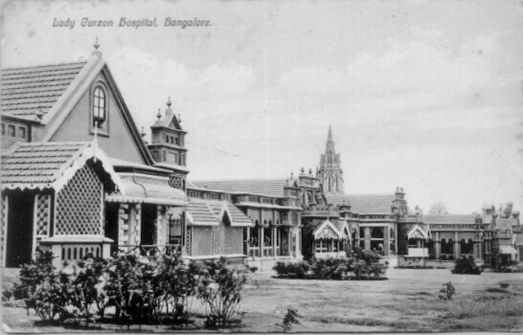
Lady Curzon hospital in the cantonment was established in 1864 and named after the first wife of the Viceroy of India, Lord Curzon.

Prior to the arrival of the British, Bangalore had been the stronghold of several Hindu dynasties and empires including the Western Ganga Dynasty, Chola Dynasty, Hoysala Empire and the Vijayanagara Empire. In the 18th century, the dominion of Bangalore passed on to Haider Ali. After a series of successive wars known as the Anglo-Mysore Wars with Haider Ali's son, Tipu Sultan, the British captured the city and all of the Kingdom of Mysore in 1799.

=== Capture of Bangalore Fort ===
Bangalore was the strongest fort of Tipu Sultan and during the Third Anglo-Mysore War, Lord Cornwallis decided to reduce this fort before the storming of Srirangapatna.

Tipu Sultan followed Cornwallis' army, placing him in the awkward position of having an undefeated enemy army at his back while besieging the strong fortification. Tipu kept away hoping to take assault when underway in flank. Over the next twelve days, two companies of the Madras Pioneers provided sappers for eight batteries, dug several parallels and a trench up to the fort ditch. Cornwallis attacked secretly on the night of 21 March 1791. The Madras Pioneers, led by Lt Colin Mackenzie, crossed the ditch with scaling ladders, mounted the breach and entered the fort, while the artillery engaged the fort with blank ammunition. With a breach made, the main stormers rushed in and the fort was captured after a hand-to hand fight in which a thousand defenders were killed. Cornwallis captured the fort and secured the force against Tipu.

The Madras Pioneers, went on to make Bangalore their permanent home.

=== Establishment of cantonment ===
The British found Bangalore to be a pleasant and appropriate place to station their garrison and therefore moved their garrison to Bangalore from Srirangapatna. The origin of the word cantonment comes from the French word canton, meaning corner or district. Each cantonment was essentially a well-defined and clearly demarcated unit of territory set apart for the quartering and administering of troops. The heart of the Bangalore Cantonment was the Parade Ground. The Civil and Military Station (CMS) grew around the Parade Ground.

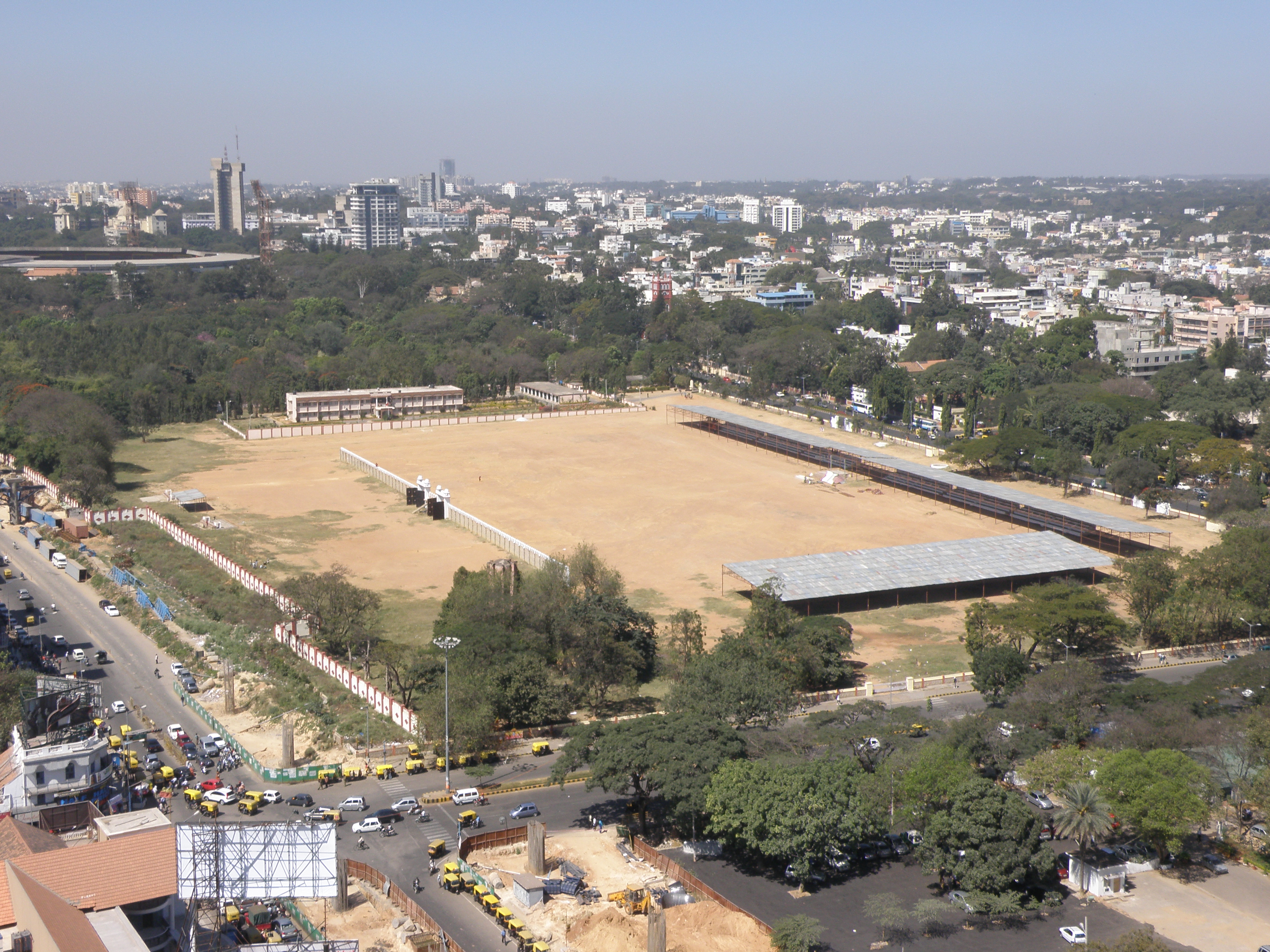
Parade Ground

The installation of the Bangalore Cantonment attracted a large number of people from Tamil Nadu and other neighboring states of the Kingdom of Mysore. Bangalore rapidly became the largest city in the Kingdom of Mysore. In 1831, the capital of the Kingdom of Mysore was moved from Mysore city to Bangalore. The Bangalore Cantonment grew independent of its twin-city, referred to as Bangalore pete (Kannada pronunciation: [ˈpeːteː]). The pete was populated with the Kannadiga population, while the Bangalore Cantonment, had a colonial design with a population that consisted of Tamilians and the British. In the 19th century, the Bangalore Cantonment had clubs, churches, bungalows, shops and cinemas. The Bangalore Cantonment had a strong European influence with public residence and life centered on the South Parade, now referred to as MG Road. The area around the South Parade was famous for its bars and restaurants with the area known as Blackpally becoming a one-stop shopping area The Cubbon Park was built in the Bangalore Cantonment in 1864 on 120 acres (0.49 km^{2}) of land. St. Mark's Cathedral was built on the South Parade grounds. The settlements adjacent to the South Parades was known as Mootocherry which was occupied by Tamil settlers from the North Arcot and South Arcot districts of Tamil Nadu.

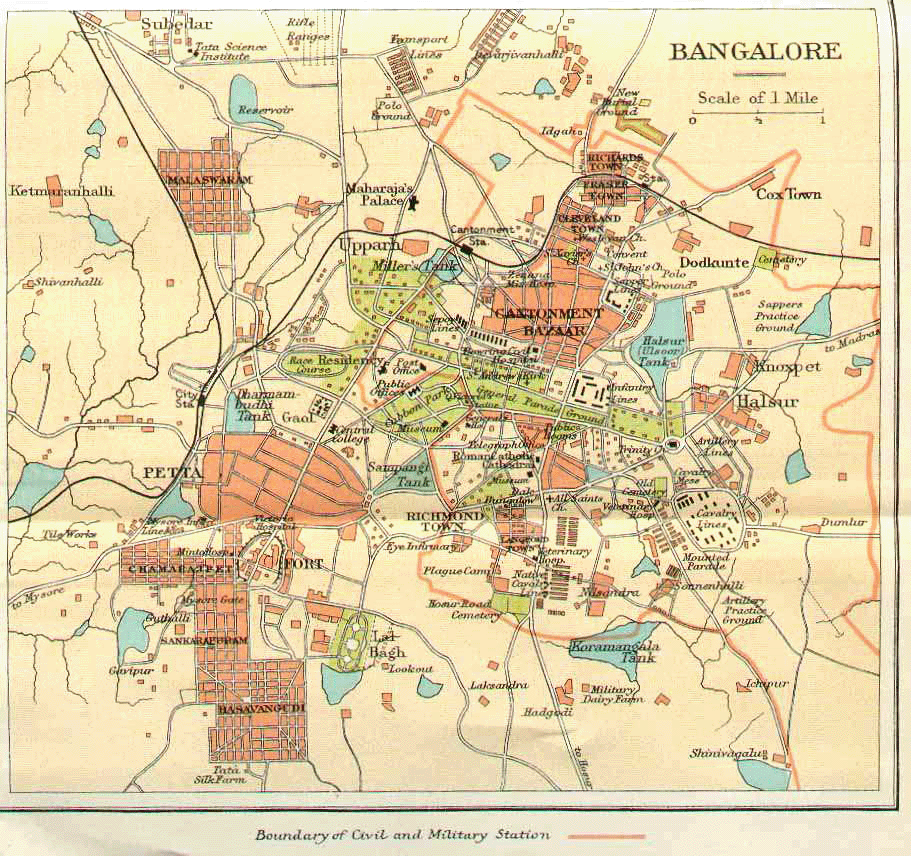
A 1924 map of the Bangalore Cantonment depicting the South Parade and the areas around it

=== Development ===
The names of many of the cantonment's streets were derived from military nomenclature such as Artillery Road, Brigade Road, Infantry Road and Cavalry Road. The city of Bangalore still retains many of the colonial names of its streets. A resident to the King of Mysore, Krishnaraja Wodeyar IV lived within the cantonment area and his quarters was called the "Residency" and hence the name Residency Road. Areas around the South Parade that essentially were public living areas were named after their European residents. A municipal corporation was established for the Bangalore Cantonment in 1863. After Indian independence in 1947, corporation merged with the Bangalore pete municipal corporation to form the Bangalore City Corporation, now known as Bruhat Bengaluru Mahanagara Palike. Bangalore was part of the Madras Presidency, and in 1864, the city was connected to Madras by rail. Still called the Bangalore Cantonment Railway Station, it is one of many railway stations servicing the city of Bangalore. Around 1883, Richmond Town, Benson Town and Cleveland Town were added to the cantonment. The population of the Bangalore pete and cantonment fell dramatically in 1898 when a bubonic plague epidemic broke out. The epidemic took a huge toll and many temples were built during this time, dedicated to the goddess Mariamma. The crisis caused by this epidemic catalyzed the improvement and sanitation of Bangalore and, in turn, improvements in sanitation and health facilities helped to modernize Bangalore. Telephone lines were laid to help coordinate anti-plague operations. Regulations for building new houses with proper sanitation facilities came into effect. A health officer was appointed in 1898 and the city was divided into four wards for better coordination and the Victoria Hospital was inaugurated in 1900 by Lord Curzon, the then Viceroy and Governor-General of British India. In 1881, the British officially stopped recognizing Bangalore as a cantonment and instead considered it to be an "assigned tract", and administered under the auspices of the Mahārājah of Mysore, Krishnaraja Wodeyar IV. However, the British retained their garrison in the city until 1947. After Indian independence, Bangalore Cantonment was merged with the rest of Bangalore City under the dominion of the Mysore State.

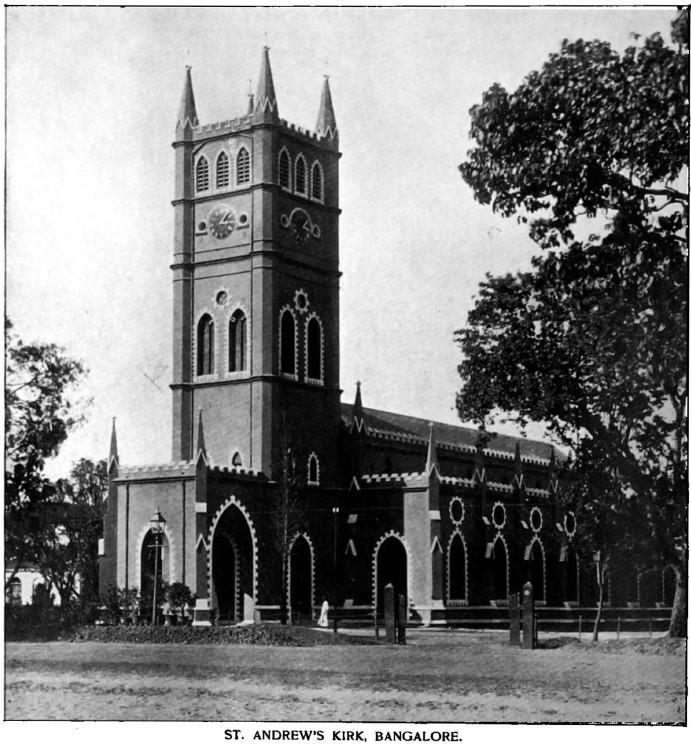
St Andrews Kirk, Bangalore around 1895 - Furneaux, JH (1895) Glimpses of India. A grand photographic history of the Land of Antiquity, the vast Empire of the East

== See also ==
- Cox Town, Bangalore
- Cooke Town
- Fraser Town, Bangalore
- Murphy Town, Bangalore
- Austin Town
- Kingdom of Mysore
- Sir Mirza Ismail
- Bangalore East Railway Station
- Bangalore Cantonment railway station
- List of areas in Bangalore Cantonment
- List of schools in Bangalore Cantonment
- Plaza Theatre (Bangalore)
