= Austin Town, Bengaluru =

- Neighbourhood
- Ferdinand Kittel Nagara
- Location within Bengaluru
- Coordinates: 12.9616°N 77.6133°E
- Country: India
- State: Karnataka
- District: Bengaluru Urban
- Metro: Bengaluru

Government
  - Body: Bengaluru Central City Corporation

Languages
  - Official: Kannada
  - Spoken: Kannada, Tamil, English, Hindi
- Time zone: UTC+5:30 (IST)
- PIN: 560047
- Lok Sabha Constituency: Bangalore Central
- Vidhan Sabha Constituency: Shantinagar
- Original Planning Agency: Bangalore Civil & Military Station Municipal Commission
- Established: 1920

Austin Town, Bengaluru, officially Ferdinand Kittel Nagara is a locality of the Bangalore Cantonment, named after a British Collector and Municipal President of the Civil and Military Station, Sir. James Austin. Located in the central part of Bangalore, the suburb is known for having produced some of India's best football players, with the game being very popular. In the age of IPL, the dream of the children of Austin Town is to be playing for the best football clubs one day.

Austin Town was established in 1920 by the building of a number of small cottages for the benefit of lower income groups, and rented out for a nominal sum. The Collector Austin was the encouragement for this project, and hence the suburb was named after him. These cottages were in great demand by poor Indians and Anglo Indians. The neighboring localities are Linden Street, Y.G. Palya, Victoria Layout, Jayaraj Nagar, Ashoknagar and Vannarapete. The Sanitary works of Austin Town was designed by W H Murphy, Executive Engineer, Municipal Council, Bangalore Civil and Military Station, after whom Murphy Town gets its name.

== Football in Austin Town ==
Unlike other parts of Bangalore where cricket is popular, football is a passion for the residents of Austin Town. Austin Town is considered the birthplace of football in Bangalore. The origins of the game can be traced to the Italian soldiers who were being held as prisoners of war during the beginning of WWI in the Bangalore Cantonment. The Italian POWs passed on the game to the natives, even though at first the natives played football bare-footed. (Some players played without boots even in the Olympics.) The very first Olympians – Anthony, Kanniah, Raman and Shanmugham – who represented the Indian football team in the Olympic Games of 1948 and 1952, were from Austin Town. Vajravelu and Varadarajan were from the City area, and the rest of the players were from the Bangalore Cantonment. Most of the football enthusiasts in Austin Town are the Tamil community, with many of the local boys now playing for clubs in Goa and Calcutta. In the 1960s and 1970s, many of the Austin Town boys made it the football teams of Government and defence companies such as HMT, MEG, ITI, NGEF, HAL, BEML, BHEL, ADA, ADE, etc. Austin Town and Murphy Town are still considered gold-mines of football talent. One of Austin Town's legend and local hero is 95-year-old T Shanmugham, who led India to victory in football in the 1951 Asian Games, and also was part of India's football team for the 1952 Olympics. The Austin Town Football Grounds is now known as Nandan Ground's after one of Indian football's greatest goalkeeper Nandan, who was also from Austin Town.

Austin Town is also the birthplace of other legendary football players such as Ulaganathan and former captain Carlton Chapman. Almost every house in the lower-middle-class families of Austin Town have football players.

== Demographics ==
As common to the other suburbs of the Bangalore Cantonment, Austin Town has a large Tamil population. They trace their ancestry to the large number of Tamil soldiers, suppliers and workers who were brought into the Bangalore Civil and Military Station, by the British Army, after the fall of Tippu Sultan. Austin Town along with other suburbs of the Bangalore Cantonment was directly under the administration of the British Madras Presidency till 1949, when it was handed over to the Mysore State.

== Anglo-Indians ==
A larger number of Anglo-Indians used to live in Austin Town, now having migrated to Australia, the UK and Canada, their numbers have declined. The Anglo-Indian Block is now inhabited mostly by non-Anglo Indians. However, those who are left behind are still proud to call Austin Town as home. During the British Raj, there was a clear distinction between the Anglo Indian and Tamil sections of Austin Town, which have now been erased, and the once posh suburbs have lost their glory as a result of poor civic maintenance. Some of the original inhabitants of Austin Town, came from Rangoon, and at that time found the cantonment to be much quieter than the busy city of Rangoon, Burma. The Christmas time for the Anglo-Indian community means celebrating with carols and parties. Some of the Anglo-Indians who migrated abroad still visit in search of their roots.
