= Richmond Town, Bengaluru =

- Neighbourhood
- Sir Mirza Ismail Nagara
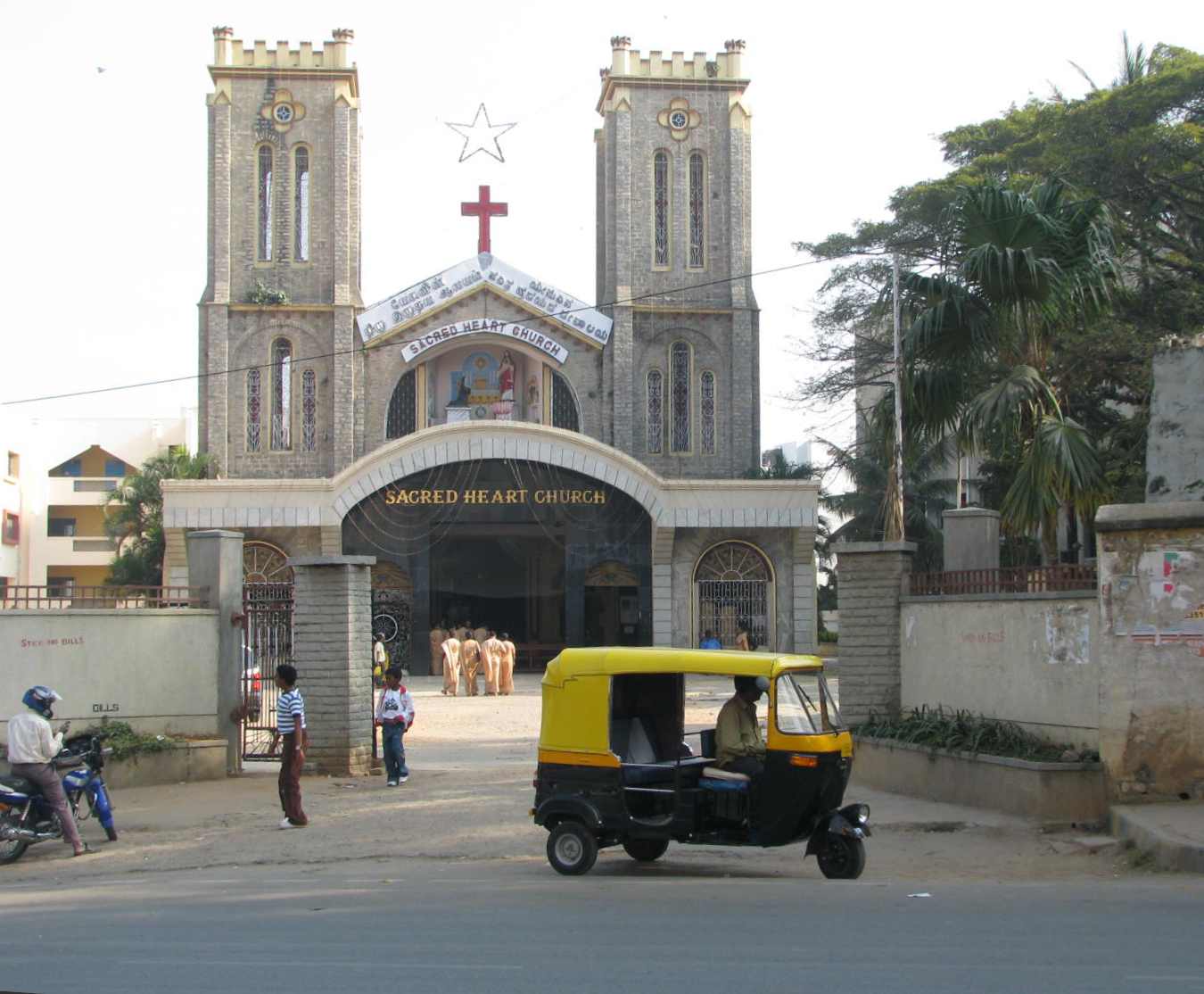
- Sacred Heart Church on Richmond Road
- Interactive map of Richmond Town, Bengaluru
- Coordinates: 12°57′45″N 77°36′14″E
- Country: India
- State: Karnataka
- Metro: Bengaluru

Languages
  - Official: Kannada, English, Urdu, Tamil
- Time zone: UTC+5:30 (IST)
- PIN: 560025

Richmond Town, Bengaluru, officially Sir Mirza Ismail Nagara is a neighbourhood in central Bangalore. It is named after Thomas Richmond, a barrister in the British India government. "He was an Anglo-Indian philanthropist and the president of the All India Anglo-Indian Association.

A part of the Bangalore Cantonment area, Richmond Town was established during British rule in 1883. During the period, the area mainly consisted of British residents, Anglo-Indians, Muslim traders from Persia, and Parsis. Like Kadamba Nagara, Sri Krishnaraja Wadiyar Nagara and Langford Town, this area was known for its colonial design.

In recent years, the locality has seen modernization and increase in real estate demand. Important landmarks in Richmond Town include Bangalore Hockey Stadium and Johnson Market.

== Notable residents ==
Sir Mirza Ismail 22nd Diwan of Mysore

Sir Arcot Ramasamy Mudaliar 24th Diwan of Mysore

Maharani Sethu Lakshmi Bayi of Travancore
