= Bengaluru East railway station =

Railway station in Karnataka India

Bengaluru East Pūrva Beṅgaḷūru
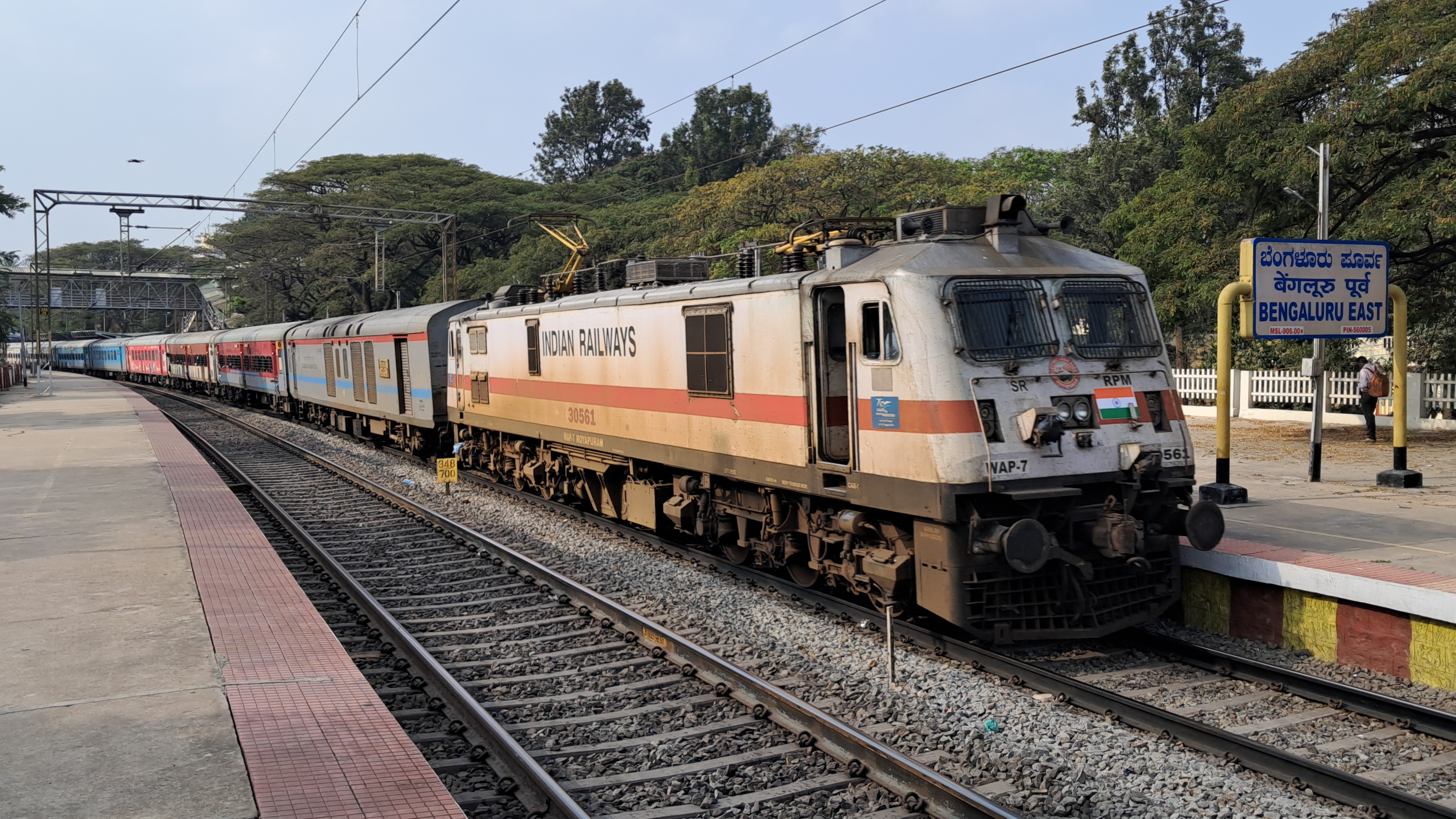
- WAP-7 Royapuram skipping this station

General information
- Location: Pottery Road, Fraser Town, Bangalore Cantonment; India
- Coordinates: 13.0014050°N 77.6182165°E
- Elevation: 915 metres (3,002 ft)
- System: Indian Railways station
- Owner: Indian Railways
- Operator: South Western Railway
- Lines: Chennai Central–Bangalore City, Bangalore–Kolar Gold Fields
- Platforms: 2
- Tracks: 4
- Connections: Fraser Town, Cox Town, Cooke Town

Construction
- Structure type: At-grade
- Parking: Yes

Other information
- Status: Functioning
- Station code: BNCE
- Zone(s): South Western Railways
- Division(s): Bangalore

History
- Opened: 1906
- Rebuilt: 2026

Services
Preceding station	Indian Railways	Following station
Bengaluru Cantonment towards Bengaluru City	South Western Railway zone Chennai Central–Bangalore City line	Baiyyappanahalli towards Yelahanka Junction, Salem Junction, Jolarpettai Junction or Chennai Central
- Computerized Ticketing Counters Luggage Checking System Parking Disabled Access Food Plaza Kiosks WC Taxi Stand Public Transportation
Location

Bengaluru East railway station, also known as Bangalore East railway station (station code: BNCE), is an old British-era railway station surrounded by Pottery Road, Kumaraswamy Naidu Road, Murgesha Mudaliar Road and Kenchappa Road. It is a small quaint station located in Fraser Town, Bangalore Cantonment. This station is very convenient for residents traveling towards or returning from Kolar Gold Fields or Madras. Express and Mail trains did not stop here until the 1920s. The station is now renovated with a larger platform. Adjacent to the railway station is the Bangalore East Football Grounds, which nowadays is more used for playing cricket. Well-known cartoonist Paul Fernandes remembers as a young boy befriending train drivers at this station and getting grease for his bicycle.

== History ==
According to the 'List of Mysore Residency records, from the year 1880–1947', the Bangalore East railway station was constructed in 1906, on the Bangalore–Madras railway line. At that time, the trains from Madras terminated at the Bangalore Cantonment railway station, in Bangalore Civil and Military Station which was controlled by the British Madras Presidency. The Bangalore City station in the Bangalore Pete (under the control of the Maharaja of Mysore), was used to connect to Mysore State. The railway line has existed since starting operations in 1864, with the launch of the Bangalore Cantonment–Jolarpettai train services by the Madras Railway. The train line was broad-gauge and 149 km long, connecting the Bangalore Cantonment with Vellore district.

== Recent developments ==
As part of the Bengaluru Cantonment–Whitefield quadrupling project, Bengaluru East railway station underwent major redevelopment works during 2025–26. The station was temporarily closed while platforms and railway infrastructure were rebuilt. Passenger services resumed on 25 May 2026 after completion of the upgrade works. The project was undertaken to improve rail capacity and suburban rail connectivity in eastern Bengaluru.

== Station Layout ==
This station consists of 2 platforms and 4 tracks which are connected by foot overbridge for passengers to board the express trains and MEMUs. These platforms are built to accumulate 24-coach express trains.

G	North Entrance Street level	Exit/Entrance & ticket counter
P	FOB, Side platform | P2 Doors will open on the left (Dedicated for MEMU trains)
P	Platform 2	Towards → Jolarpettai Junction; Next Station: Baiyyappanahalli
P	Express Lines	Towards → Jolarpettai Junction / MGR Chennai Central
P	Express Lines	Towards ← KSR Bengaluru / Mysuru Junction
P	Platform 1	Towards ← KSR Bengaluru; Next Station: Bengaluru Cantonment
P	FOB, Side platform | P1 Doors will open on the left (Dedicated for MEMU trains)
G	South Entrance Street level	Exit/Entrance & ticket counter

== Gallery ==
Some of this railway station pictures are shown below:-

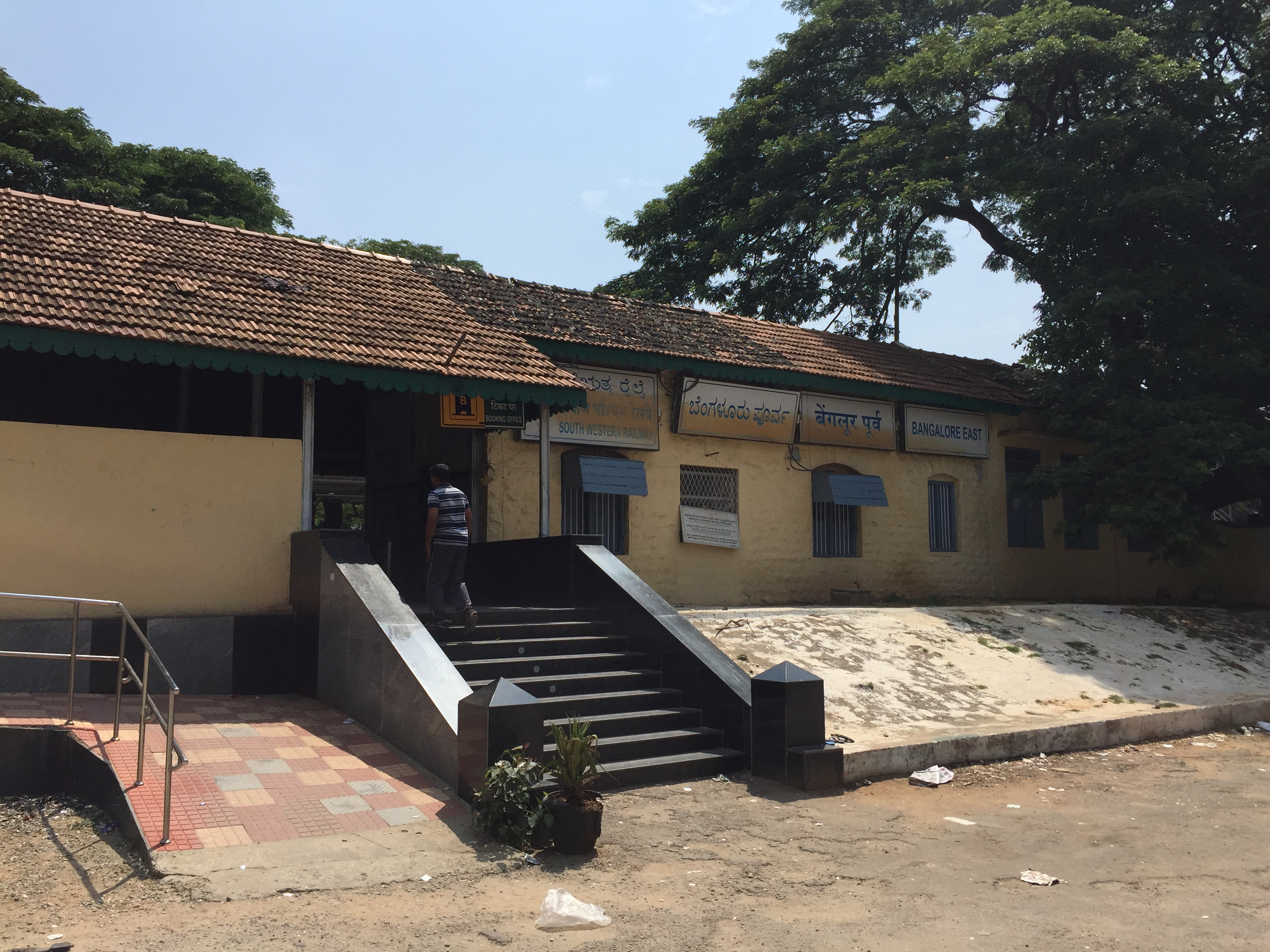
Bangalore East railway station. The original British period stone building.

Bangalore East railway station, ticket counter. The original British period stone building.

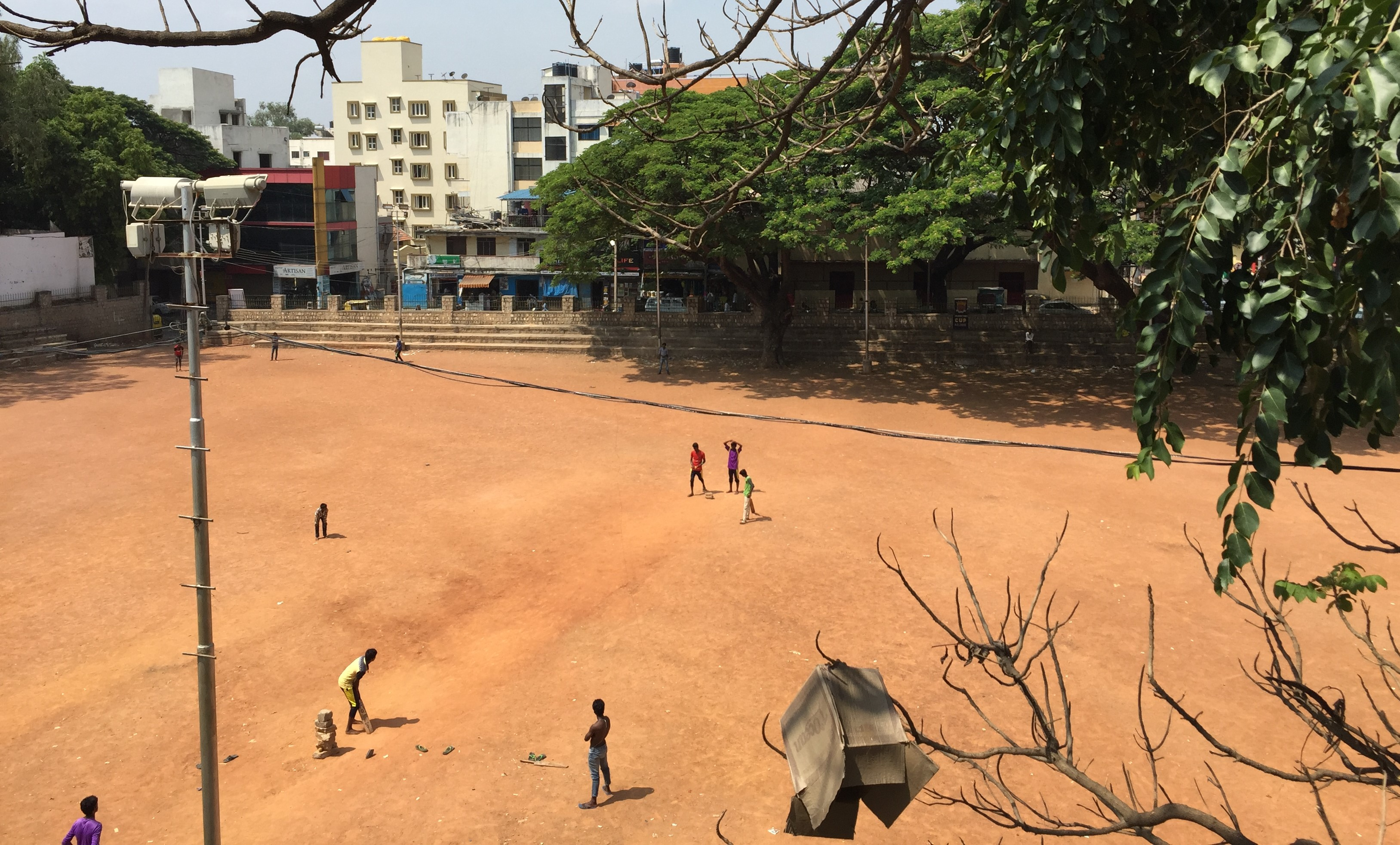
Bangalore East football ground

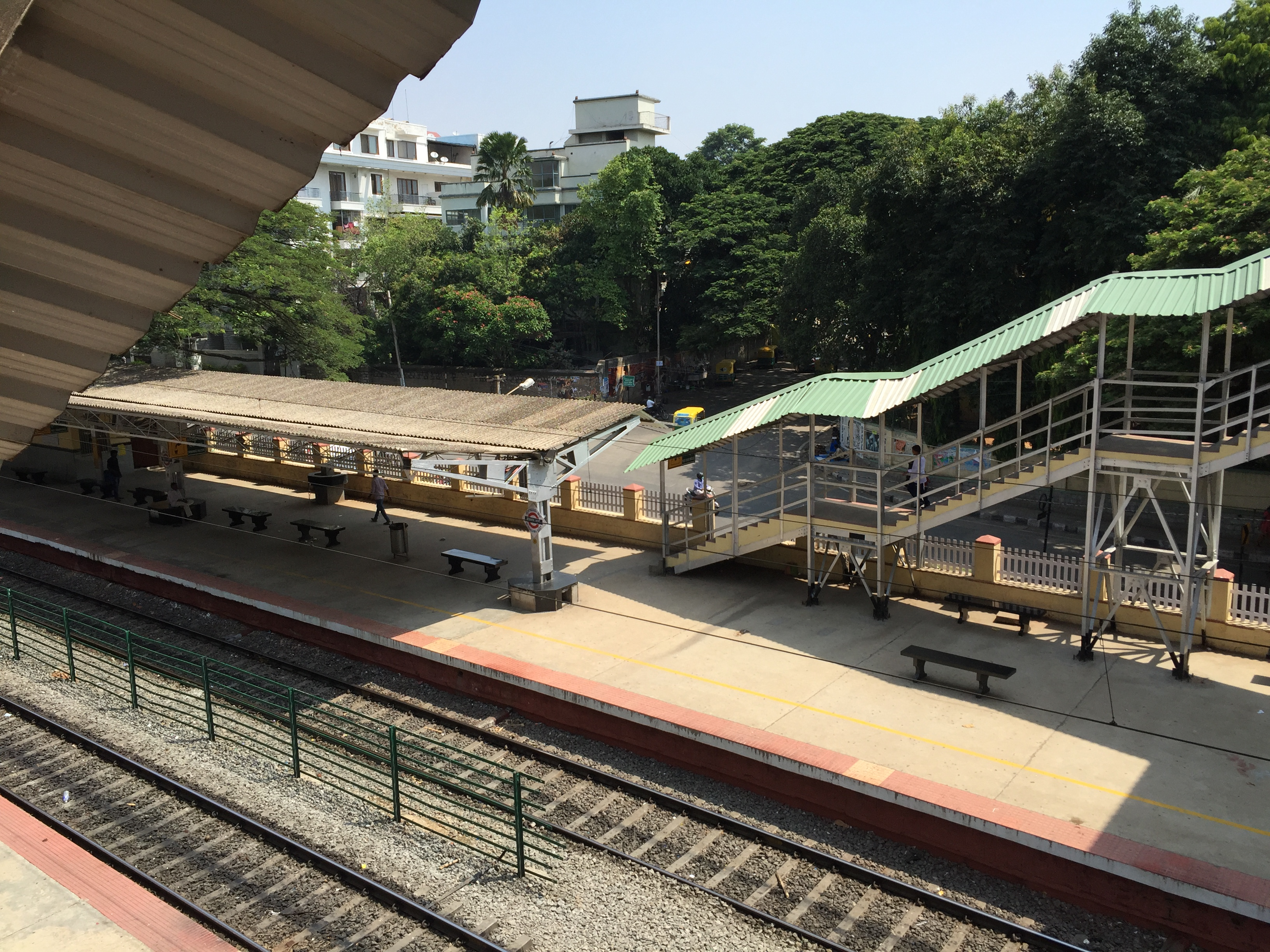
Aerial view of Bangalore East railway station

Bangalore East railway station, board

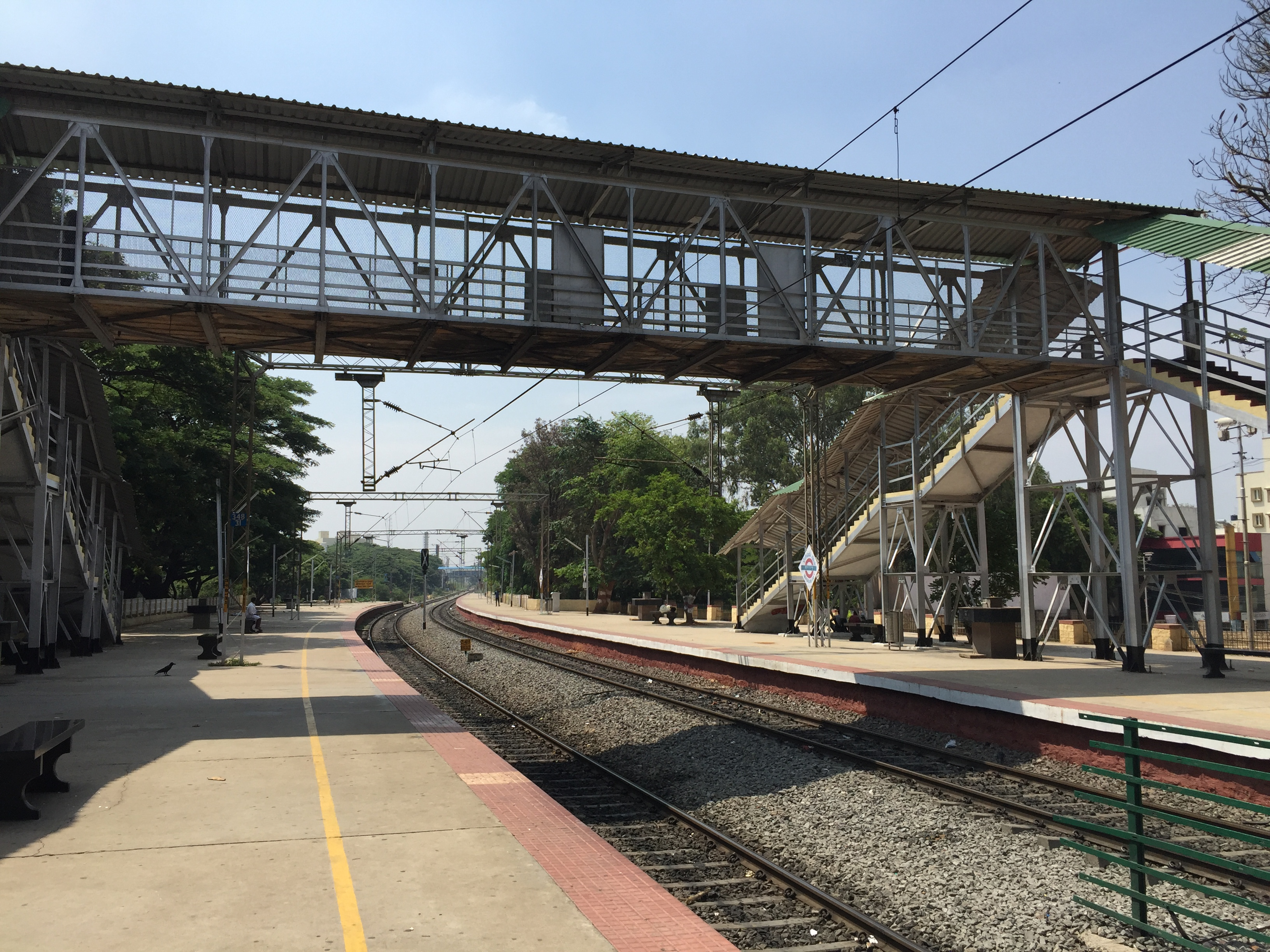
Bangalore East railway station, pedestrian crossing
