= Cooke Town =

- Neighbourhood
- Location within Bengaluru
- Coordinates: 13.002557°N 77.6186101°E
- Country: India
- City: Bangalore Cantonment

Government
  - Body: BBMP

Languages
  - Official: Kannada
  - Spoken: Kannada, English, Tamil
- Time zone: UTC+5:30 (IST)
- PIN: 560005
- Lok Sabha Constituency: Bangalore Central
- Vidhan Sabha Constituency: Jayamahal
- Original Planning Agency: Bangalore Civil & Military Station Municipal Commission
- Established: 1900

Cooke Town is a neighbourhood in Bangalore Cantonment, in Bangalore Central, India. Built as a suburb before Indian Independence, it is one of Bangalore's oldest neighbourhoods, established when the Bangalore Civil and Military Station was governed by the Madras Government. Cooke Town is named after G H Cooke, President of the Bangalore Civil and Military Station Municipality between 1928 and 1934, with the Mayo Hall being constructed during his tenure. The suburb, along with other suburbs of the Bangalore Cantonment such as Pulakeshi Nagara, Sarvagnanagara, Sir Mirza Ismail Nagara, and Langford Town, has seen dynamic changes over last few years with large British Raj era bungalows being demolished to build luxury apartments. These developments have resulted in large-scale tree-felling. However, Cooke Town still manages to retain some of its colonial charm, and is called the nicest place in the Cantonment by Bangalore historian Peter Colaco. Cooke Town is a posh neighbourhood with plenty of greenery, parks, educational institutions, hospitals and is at close proximity to the Bangalore East Railway Station in the Bangalore CBD. According to Colliers International, Cooke Town is one of Bangalore's most costliest neighbourhoods, with the cost of property being in the range to INR 90000-95000 per sq.ft (in January 2026), just slightly lesser than the Bangalore CBD.

== G. H. Cooke ==
G. H. Cooke, Esq., MC, ICS served as the Collector and President of the Bangalore Civil and Military Station Municipal Commission from 1928 to 1934. He was also the president of the Bangalore Club between 1931-1933. Cooke was also among the 'Fellowship of Baldwins', who supported the Baldwin Boys' High School. In 1933, G. H. Cooke served as the Inspector of Schools, for Bangalore and Coorg.

== Location ==
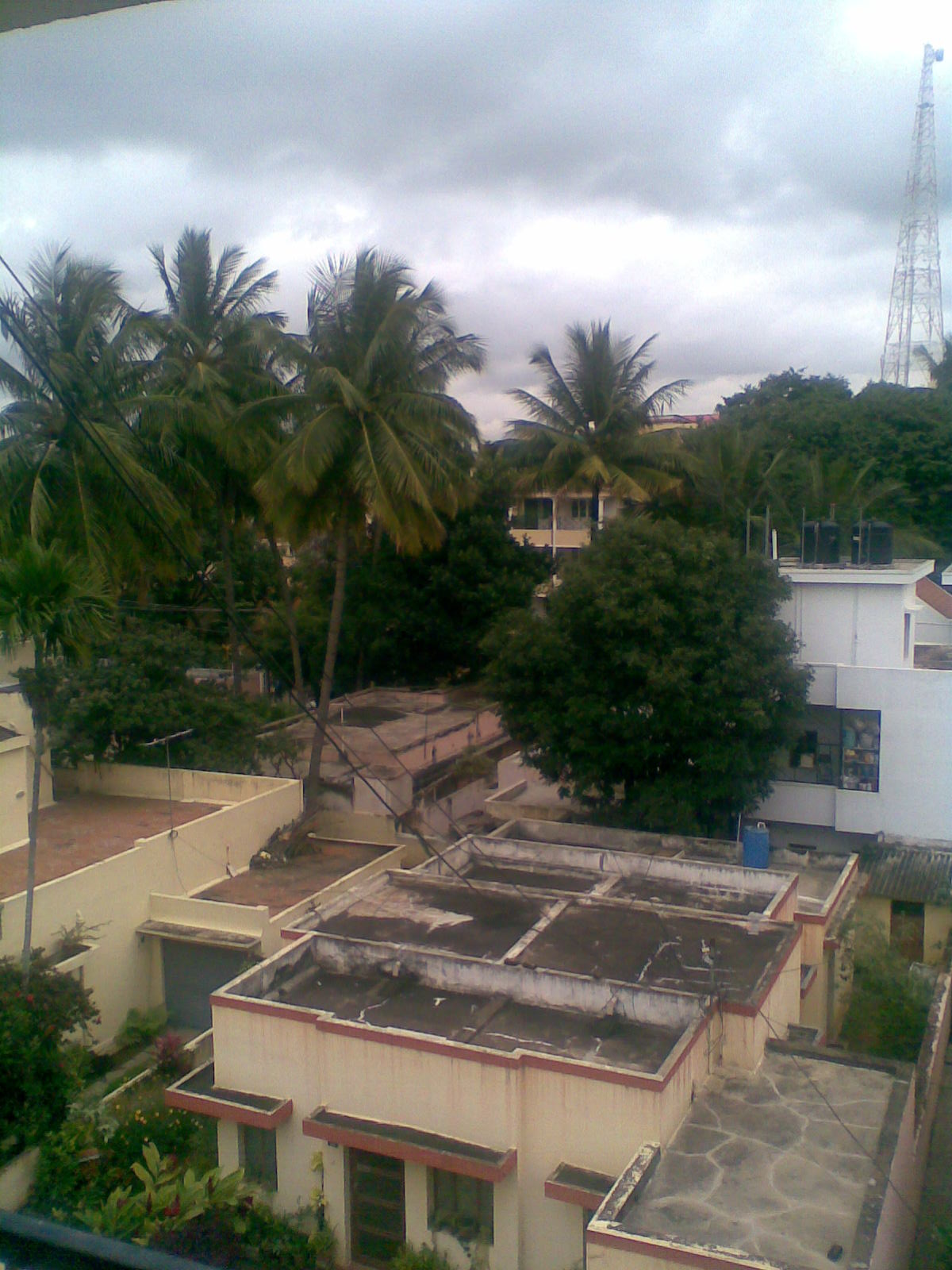
Houses in Cooke Town

Cooke Town is surrounded by the neighbourhoods of Pulakeshi Nagara, Sarvagnanagara, Pottery Town, Richards Town, and Kadamba Nagara, which are similar in that they were all pre-independence parts of the erstwhile Bangalore Civil and Military Station of the Madras Presidency. The townscape being easily distinguishable from that of the Bangalore Pete and South and West Bangalore, which was under the erstwhile Mysore State.

== People and culture ==
The Bangalore Cantonment has a large Tamil population. They trace their ancestry to the large number of Tamil soldiers, suppliers and workers who were brought into the Bangalore Civil and Military Station, by the British Army, after the fall of Tippu Sultan. Cooke Town is also home to expats, foreign students from the Middle East and Africa. The suburb is home to Pentecostal Churches, and also includes a Korean Jehovah’s Witnesses congregation. A wide range of cuisines such as French, Vietnamese, Lebanese, Syrian, etc. are available in Cooke Town A study by Colliers International indicated that Cooke Town was the second costliest suburb in Bangalore, with an average apartment with 3 bedrooms (3BHK), costing between INR 30-60 million (USD 450,000 to 1 million).

== Landmarks ==
=== Bangalore Pork Shop ===
The Bangalore Pork Shop is one of the Bangalore Cantonment's oldest establishment, and is located on Hutchin's Road. Its branch called the 'Bangalore Ham Shop' at M G Road at the Bangalore CBD was established in 1928.

=== Milton Street Park ===
The Milton Street Park is located in Cooke Town. The Park is now being improved by the efforts of the Residents Welfare Association of Bangalore East (REWABE). Till a few years back, the park was badly maintained and used by miscreants for illegal activities. Repeated complaints to civic authorities, the local corporator and MLA did not yield any results. Finally, the Residents Welfare Association of Bangalore East (REWABE) took matters into their own hands, and raised funds by auctioning paintings by local children, which was used for improving the park. The Hand-in-Hand Flea Market held regularly at the park to raise funds has gained popularity in the city of Bangalore and gives the residents a platform to showcase and sell their handmade products, arts, crafts and homemade food.

=== Ascension Church ===
The Ascension Church, located in Dacosta Layout, in Cooke Town, was established in 1966. Cardinal Lourdusamy and Archbishop Arokiaswamy helped build the present church, which was inaugurated on 21 December 1973. The church offers Mass services in English, Kannada and Tamil.

=== Masjid-e-Munawara ===
The Masjid-e-Munawara mosque is located on Hutchin's Road at Cooke Town. The mosque has a large multi-storey commercial complex. Attached to the mosque is the Centre for Islamic Studies consisting of an Islamic Library. The centre hosts debates on comparative religion.
