= Cox Town, Bengaluru =

Cox Town, Bangalore
- Neighborhood
- Sarvagnanagara
- Location within Bengaluru
- Coordinates: 12.9940515°N 77.6242794°E
- Country: India
- State: Karnataka
- District: Bengaluru Urban
- Metro: Bengaluru

Government
  - Type: Municipal Corporation
  - Body: Bengaluru Central City Corporation, Greater Bengaluru Authority

Languages
  - Official: Kannada
- Time zone: UTC+5:30 (IST)
- PIN: 560005
- Lok Sabha Constituency: Bangalore Central
- Vidhan Sabha Constituency: Sarvagnanagar
- Original Planning Agency: Bangalore Civil & Military Station Municipal Commission

Cox Town, Bengaluru, officially Sarvagnanagara is a neighborhood of the Bangalore Cantonment, located in the central part of the city and named after the last Collector and District Magistrate of the Bangalore Civil and Military Station, Alexander Ranken Cox (A R Cox), Indian Civil Services. It is one of the suburbs which came out of the plan to de-congest thickly populated areas of the Bangalore Cantonment after the bubonic plague. Agricultural fields were converted for this purpose, and town was planned according to modern hygienic standards, with drainage and conservancy conveniences. Sarvagnanagara is bound by the Bangalore-Madras Railway line on the North and East, Wheeler Road in the East and the Ulsoor Polo Ground in the South. It consists of posh localities like Heerachand Layout and other localities like Sindhi Colony, Jeevanahalli, Doddigunta, and roads such as Assaye Road, Charles Campbell Road, Wheeler Road, etc. and is adjoining the suburbs of Pulakeshi Nagara, Sri Krishnaraja Wadiyar Nagara and Cooke Town, with easy access to the Bengaluru East Railway Station, Halasuru, Lingarajapura, Shivajinagara. Sarvagnanagara is a well planned, posh and preferred locality in the Bangalore Cantonment, created during the British Raj. The residents of Sarvagnanagara follow a liberal 'live a let live' attitude, with suburb still retaining much of its green cover, without excessive commercialisation. In 1988, the BBMP renamed Cox Town as Sarvagnanagara, after a 16th-century saint poet.

== Alexander Ranken Cox ==
Alexander Ranken Cox, ICS, was a civil servant of the British Madras Presidency, who served as the Collector of the Bangalore Civil and Military Station between 1912 and November 1917. Cox, was educated at Clifton and Emmanuel College, Cambridge, passing the ICS in 1901 and arrived in India on 31 December 1902. During his tenure at the C&M Station Bangalore, he was successful in continuing the reforms started by the previous collector the C&M Station F J Richards, ICS. The C&M Station municipality decided to name the new extension of the Bangalore Cantonment after A R Cox. A R Cox also served as the District Collector of the Tirunelveli District between 21 October 1918 to 7 November 1920, the District Collector of the Niligris between 27 October 1928 to 9 March 1931, Collector of Madras around 1931, and Member of the Board of Revenue, Madras Presidency in 1931.

== Military Heritage ==
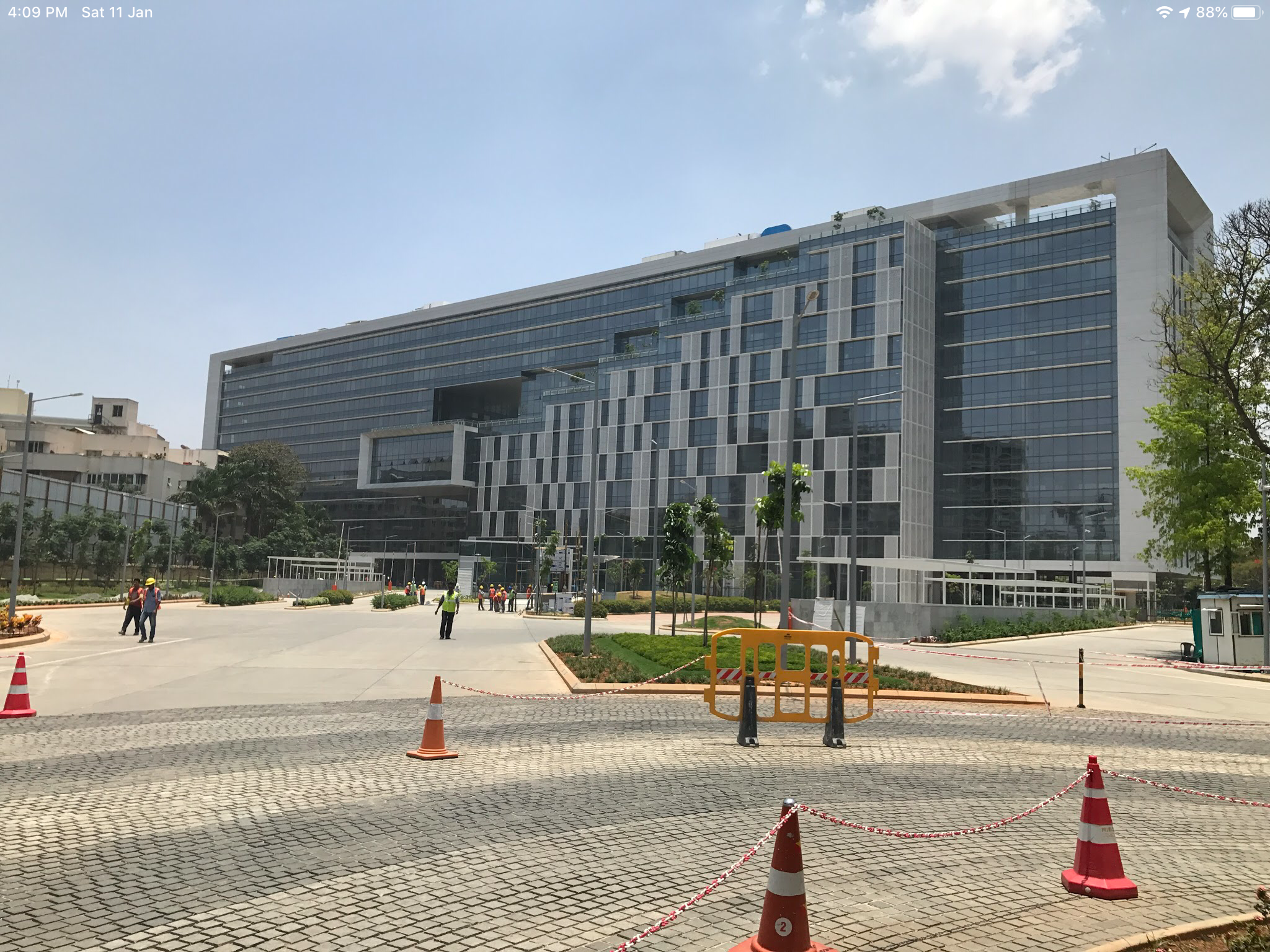
ITC Infotech Campus at Sarvagnanagara, Bangalore

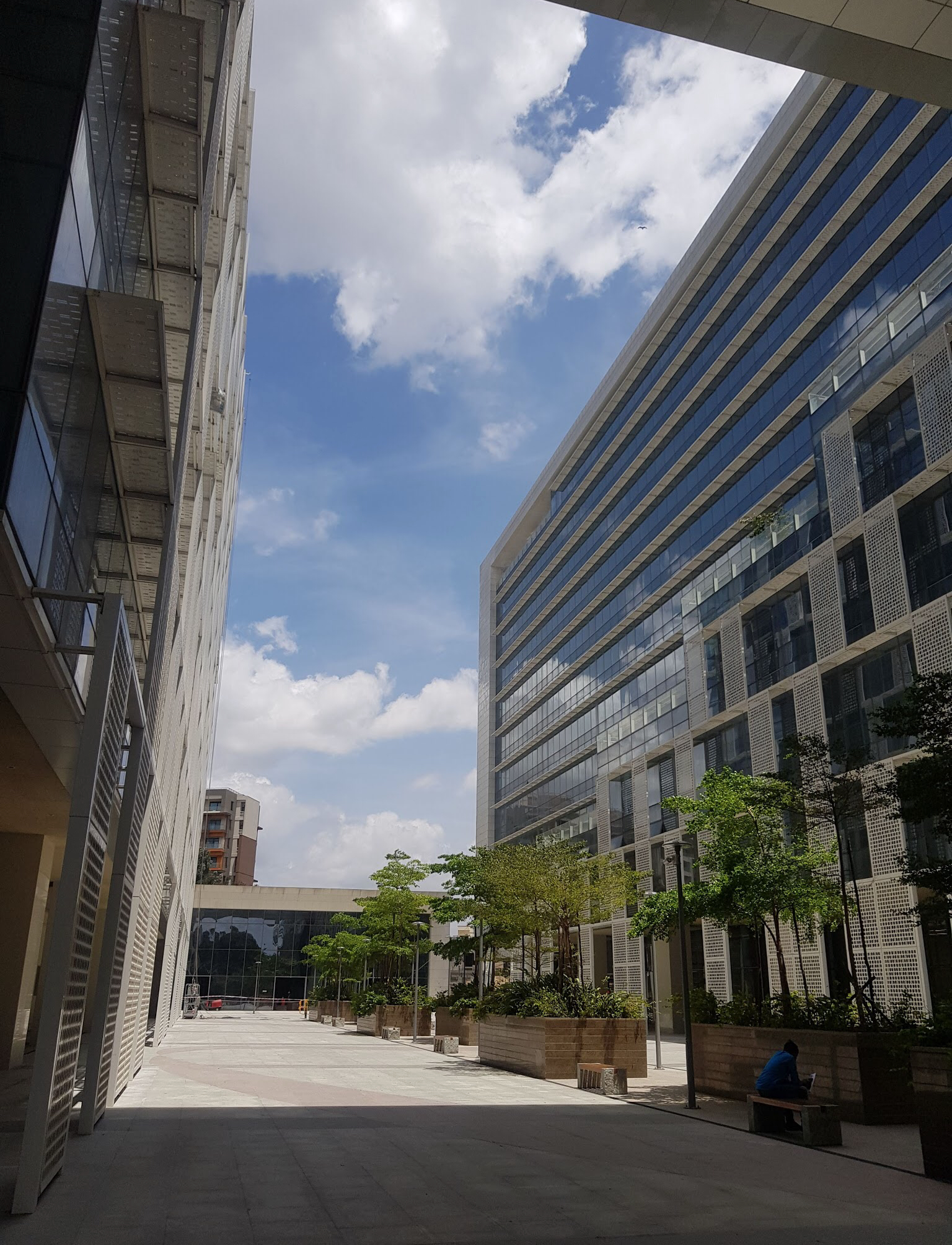
Inside the ITC Infotech Campus

Many roads in Sarvagnanagara are named after battles in which the Madras Sappers took part in. Assaye Road is named after the Battle of Assaye, Meanee Avenue is named after the Battle of Meeanee and the Malakand Lines Training Grounds is named after the Siege of Malakand - All battles in which the Madras Sappers took an active part.

== Sarvagnanagara Market ==
The BBMP demolished the old British-era Sarvagnanagara Market in 1999 after evicting the traders, replacing it with an office block. The promised new Sarvagnanagara Market has not come through, and the traders are forced to ply their trade on the footpath and streets, endangering pedestrians and worsening traffic jams.

== People and Culture ==
Like in other suburbs of the Bangalore Cantonment, Sarvagnanagara has a large Tamil population. They trace their ancestry to the large number of Tamil soldiers, suppliers and workers who were brought into the Bangalore Civil and Military Station, by the British Army, after the fall of Tippu Sultan. Sarvagnanagara along with other suburbs of the Bangalore Cantonment was directly under the administration of the British Madras Presidency till 1949, when it was handed over to the Mysore State. The large Tamil population co-exist peacefully with Anglo-Indians and other communities, making Sarvagnanagara a melting pot of cultures.

== Sindhi Colony ==
Sindhi Colony is a quite residential area of Sarvagnanagara, located between Assaye Road and Wheeler Road, with majority Sindhi residents. The Sindhis trace their ancestry from the Sindhi Hindu Refugees who fled the newly formed Pakistan after the Partition of British India, in the face of Hindu-Muslim riots in Sindh. The Colony has 60 houses, a Sindhi Temple, Community Hall and Sindhi Society. Most of the original inhabitants crossed into India through Rajasthan, going towards Bombay and finally settling down in Bangalore Sindhi Colony. The Mysore State Government allocated the land for the Sindhi migrants, offering land at subsidised prices. The Sindhi Cooperative Housing Society was established to help community members buy land and build houses. Most of the Sindhis are into business and run well known businesses such as Kids Kemp, Bhagatram Sweets and Favourite Shop.

== British Period Sarvagnanagara ==
Sarvagnanagara, like the rest of the Bangalore Cantonment had a distinct British influence on its culture. It was common sight to see families taking out pedigree dogs out for walks in the mornings. Western attire was also common. English vegetables, meat, pastry, Indian crispies were readily available, with coffee and dosa costing only one quarter anna. Butlers were dressed in their best, and orthodox people wore a coat and tie along with their Indian attire.

One of the residents of British Sarvagnanagara was Lydia Muthulakshmi, a young Tamil / Telugu widow of the Naidu caste, who broke shackles of caste regulations by remarrying (in those days, widows were not allowed to remarry, they were forced to stay indoors in Zenanas and not allowed to go outside their homes). At that time caste Hindus fought legal battles by giving police complaints, representations to the government and legal battles in Bangalore, Madras and Trichy, in order to stop Muthulaksmi. She stood firmly against all these efforts and married Rev. Paramanandam of the Wesley Tamil Church. The incident played during 1888–98, also led to caste Hindus withdrawing their children from Christian schools for a brief period. Rev. Picken consulted the Wesleyan Mission Chairman Rev. Josiah Hudson (after whom the Hudson Memorial Church is named after), and tried to delay baptism as long as possible, keeping in view the repercussions on the working of the Mission in Bangalore. The story of Muthulakshmi is told in the book 'From an Indian Zenana: The Story of Lydia Muthulakshmi' by Rev WH Jackson Picken. The book also has an old photograph of the Wesley Tamil Church Haines Road and Narayan Pillai Street, dated 1892.
