= Binnamangala, Bengaluru =

Binnamangala
- neighbourhood
- Location within Bengaluru
- Coordinates: 12.980806122943287°N 77.63900460325799°E
- Country: India
- State: Karnataka
- Metro: Bengaluru

Languages
  - Official: Kannada, English
- Time zone: UTC+5:30 (IST)
- PIN: 560038

Binnamangala is one of the early settlements in Bengaluru. It is part of C. V. Raman Nagar Assembly constituency in East Bengaluru. This former village was merged with Bangalore Mahanagara Palike in the 1981 census.

Population details
Village Name	Area in Hectares (1981)	Urban component	Population (1961)	1971	1981	1991	2001	2011
Binnamangala	168.03	Full	-	-	BMP	BMP	BMP	BBMP
