= Fraser Town, Bengaluru =

Neighbourhood in Central Part of Bengaluru City, Karnataka, India

Fraser Town Mootocherry
- Neighbourhood
- Pulakeshi Nagara
- Location within Bengaluru
- Coordinates: 12.9947°N 77.6138°E
- Country: India
- State: Karnataka
- District: Bengaluru Urban
- Metro: Bengaluru

Government
  - Type: Municipal Corporation
  - Body: Bengaluru Central City Corporation

Languages
  - Official: Kannada
  - Spoken: Kannada, Urdu & English
- Time zone: UTC+5:30 (IST)
- PIN: 560005
- Vehicle registration: KA 01
- Lok Sabha Constituency: Bangalore Central
- Vidhan Sabha Constituency: Pulakeshinagar
- Original Planning Agency: Bangalore Civil & Military Station Municipal Commission
- Established: 8 March 1907

Fraser Town, Bengaluru, officially Pulakeshi Nagara and historically referred to as Mootocherry is an elite locality of Bangalore Cantonment, located in the Central part of the City spread over 4 km^{2}. It was established in 1906 and is named after Stuart Mitford Fraser (1864–1963), who was the tutor and guardian of Krishna Raja Wadiyar IV, Maharaja of Mysore. Fraser Town was established to de-congest the growing Bangalore Civil and Military Station (otherwise known as the Bangalore Cantonment). Its foundation was laid in August 1910 by Mrs. F J Richards, with a commemorative plaque on the corner of Coles Road and Mosque Road.

It is a Residential and Commercial Neighbourhood, the prominent roads being Mosque Rd, Coles Rd, Robertson Rd, Stephens Rd, MM Rd, Promenade Rd, Spencer Rd, Netaji Rd, Haines Road, Wheeler Road etc. The neighborhood is Known for its communal harmony, where Muslims, Hindus, and Christians have coexisted peacefully for generations. Before being known as Fraser Town, the neighborhood was referred to as Mootocherry. In 1988, the then Bangalore City Corporation renamed Fraser Town as Pulakeshi Nagara, after Pulakeshin II who ruled the Deccan in the 7th century but the original name is still in common use.

== People and culture ==
Like other suburbs of the Bangalore Cantonment, Fraser Town has a large Tamil population. They trace their ancestry to the large number of Tamil soldiers, suppliers and workers who were brought into the Bangalore Civil and Military Station, by the British Army, after the fall of Tippu Sultan. Pulakeshi Nagara along with other suburbs of the Bangalore Cantonment was directly under the administration of the British Madras Presidency till 1949, when it was handed over to the Mysore State.

Fraser Town is home to a large Christian population, dating back to the days of the British Raj. The Wesleyan Tamil Mission was established in Bangalore by Rev. Elijah Hoole and James Mowatt in April 1821, in the location where the Goodwill's Girls School and the Wesley English Church is presently located, north of Coles Park. Elijah Hoole in his book Personal Narrative of a Mission to the South of India, from 1820 to 1828 acknowledges the help rendered by the British Resident in Mysore, Arthur Henry Cole, in getting the support of the Maharaja of Mysore. Majority of the Christians were from Tamil-speaking community in the 19th century, and have contributed towards building the Bangalore Cantonment. Elite Muslims of the Bangalore Cantonment prefer to live in Fraser Town. The suburb serves as an best example for unity in diversity. Hindus and Christians do not play loud music or cause disturbance during the time of breaking the Roza (fast) during the Muslim Holy month of Ramzan. Muslims also reciprocate by co-operating and during the St. Marys's Feast (observed by Christians of the Cantonment) and Christmas celebrations

== Colonial heritage ==
The streets of Fraser Town, like that of most in the Bangalore Cantonment, are named after European civil servants, military officers and missionaries. Coles Park and Coles Road after Arthur Henry Cole (1780–1844), Resident of Mysore. Haines Road was named after Lt. Col. Gregory Haines, Superintendent of the Bangalore Division under Sir Mark Cubbon. Saunders Road was named of Mysore, serving between 1875 and 1877. Robertson Road, named after Col. Donald Robertson. Wheeler Road, Cleveland Road and surrounding Cleveland Town named after General John Wheeler Cleveland, who along with his wife is buried in the Kalpalli Cemetery.

Fraser Town was planned after many areas of Bangalore were hit by the plague especially Knoxpete, now called Murphy Town. J. H. Stephens, the Municipal Engineer to the Corporation of Civil and Military Station of Bangalore till 1912, wrote a book called Plague-proof Town Planning, detailing how Pulakeshi Nagara was designed and built.

View of a block of buildings in erection. Plague-proof Town Planning by J H Stephens 1914

Richard's Park and surrounding Richard's Town after F J Richards, President of the Bangalore Civil and Military Station Municipality between 1908 and 1912, who is credited with starting the Dairy Farm and Veterinary Hospital on Queen's Road, and improving the Halasuru Lake. Neighbouring Cooke Town is named after G H Cooke, President of the Bangalore Civil and Military Station Municipality between 1928 and 1934, with the Mayo Hall being constructed during his tenure. Further Durbar surgeons Sir. John Colin Campbell has Campbell Road named after him, and Dr. P H Benson has Benson Town (Kadamba Nagara) named after him.

== Inscription ==
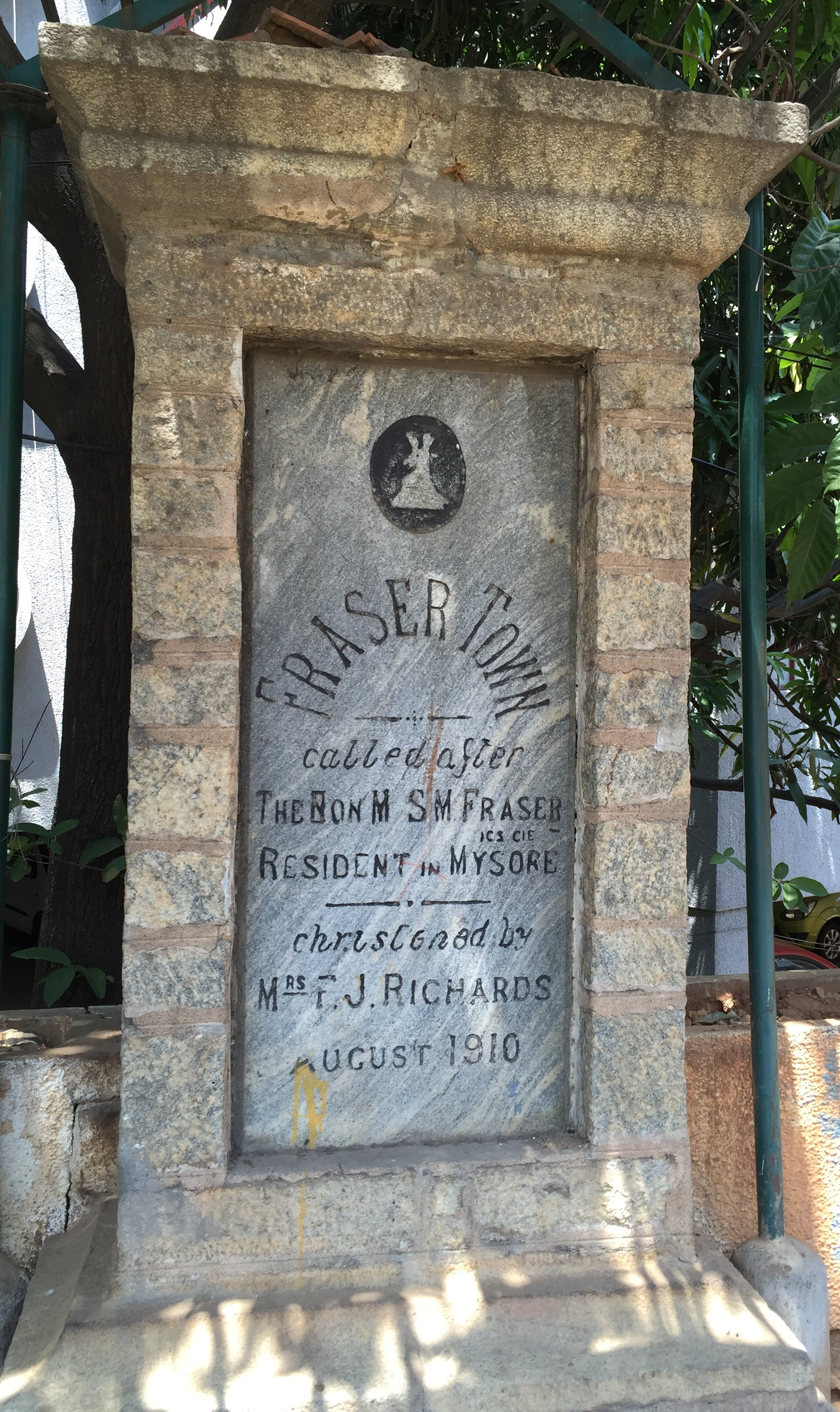
Pulakeshi Nagara Foundation

Inscription on the commemorative plaque on the corner of Coles Road and Mosque Road, reads

FRASER TOWN
called after
THE HON M S M FRASER ICS CIE
RESIDENT IN MYSORE
christened by
MRS F. J. RICHARDS
AUGUST 1910

== Historical Places ==
=== Coles Park ===
Coles Park is one of the popular parks in Fraser Town, located at the west of St. John's Hill, Surrounded by Promenade Road, Haines Road, Kemp Road, St. John's Church Road and Saunders Road. Coles Park is named after Arthur Henry Cole (1780–1844), British Resident of Mysore (1809, 1812), who went on to become the member of Parliament on return to Ireland, representing Enniskillen between 1828 and 1844. Arthur Henry Cole paid an important role in getting the support of the Maharaja of Mysore for the construction of St. Bartholomew's Church in Mysore. Covering an areas an area of 27,280m^{2}, Coles Park was established in 1914. Coles Park was once in its peak of glory with a bandstand and three tennis courts. The Band of the Bangalore Rifle Volunteers played at the bandstand every first Saturday of the month. YWCA used to run of the tennis courts. The park is fairly maintained, even though there are some encroachments. Coles Park is officially known as the Freedom Fighters Park; however, it is still popularly known by its former official name. The park is open between 5AM and 11PM, but the Nursery is closed except during the Lalbagh Flower Show. The Madras Sappers Regiment has a memorial for fallen Indian soldiers in various conflicts, including the Kargil Conflict.

=== Albert Bakery ===
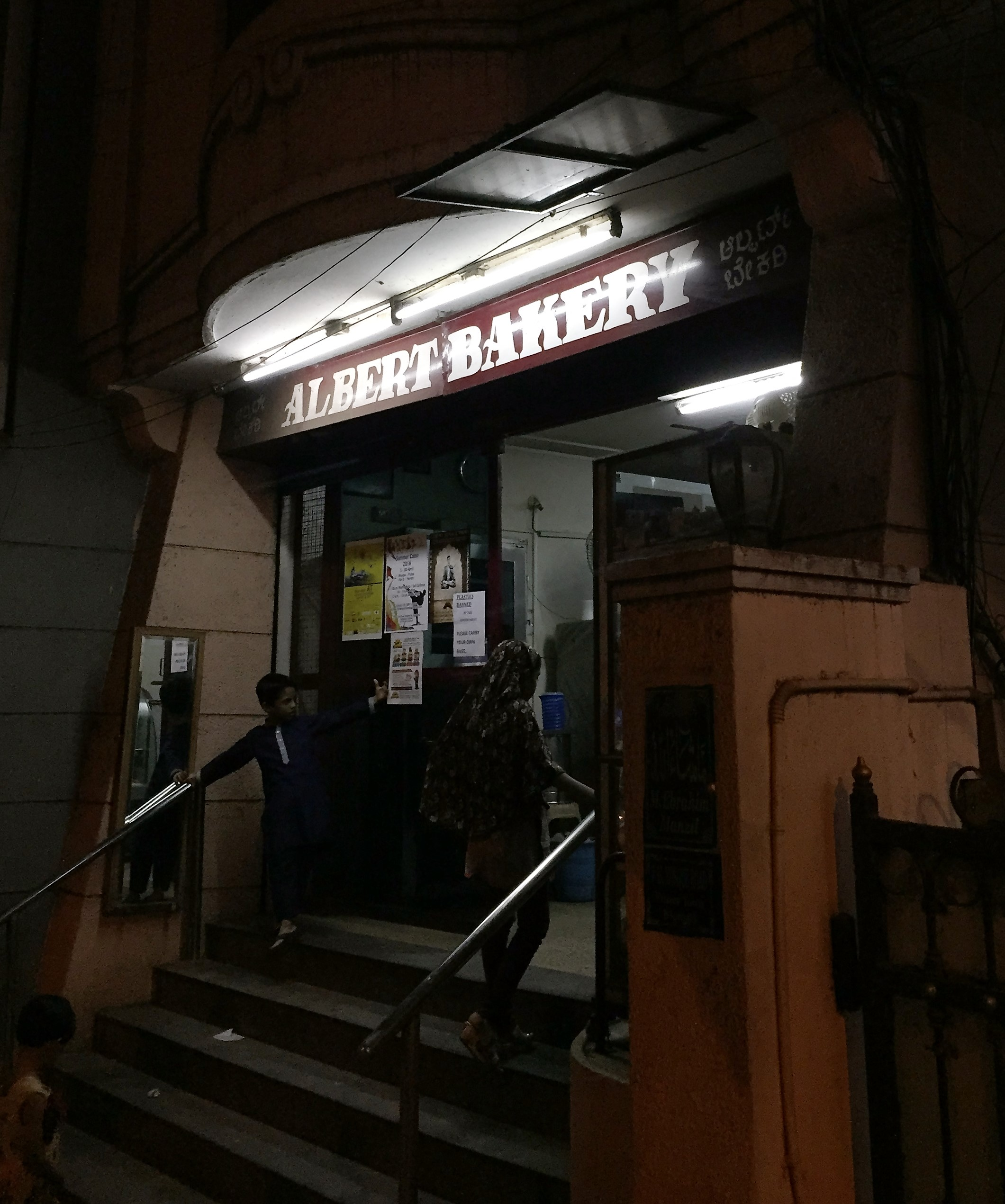
Albert Bakery, Pulakeshi Nagara

Albert Bakery is a popular bakery on Mosque Road, attracting large crowds, famous for its snacks, pastries and non-vegetarian food, and during Ramzan, Albert Bakery is famous for its "bheja" or goat brain puffs. Albert Bakery was founded in 1902, by a Muslim, who felt that giving his bakery an English name would appeal to the cosmopolitan and European clientele in Fraser Town and named it after Prince Albert. Albert Bakery initially operated from a godown and was located in Sangam Lane, off Kamraj Road, and moved to the present Mosque Rd. premises in 1912.

=== Haji Sir Ismail Sait Mosque ===
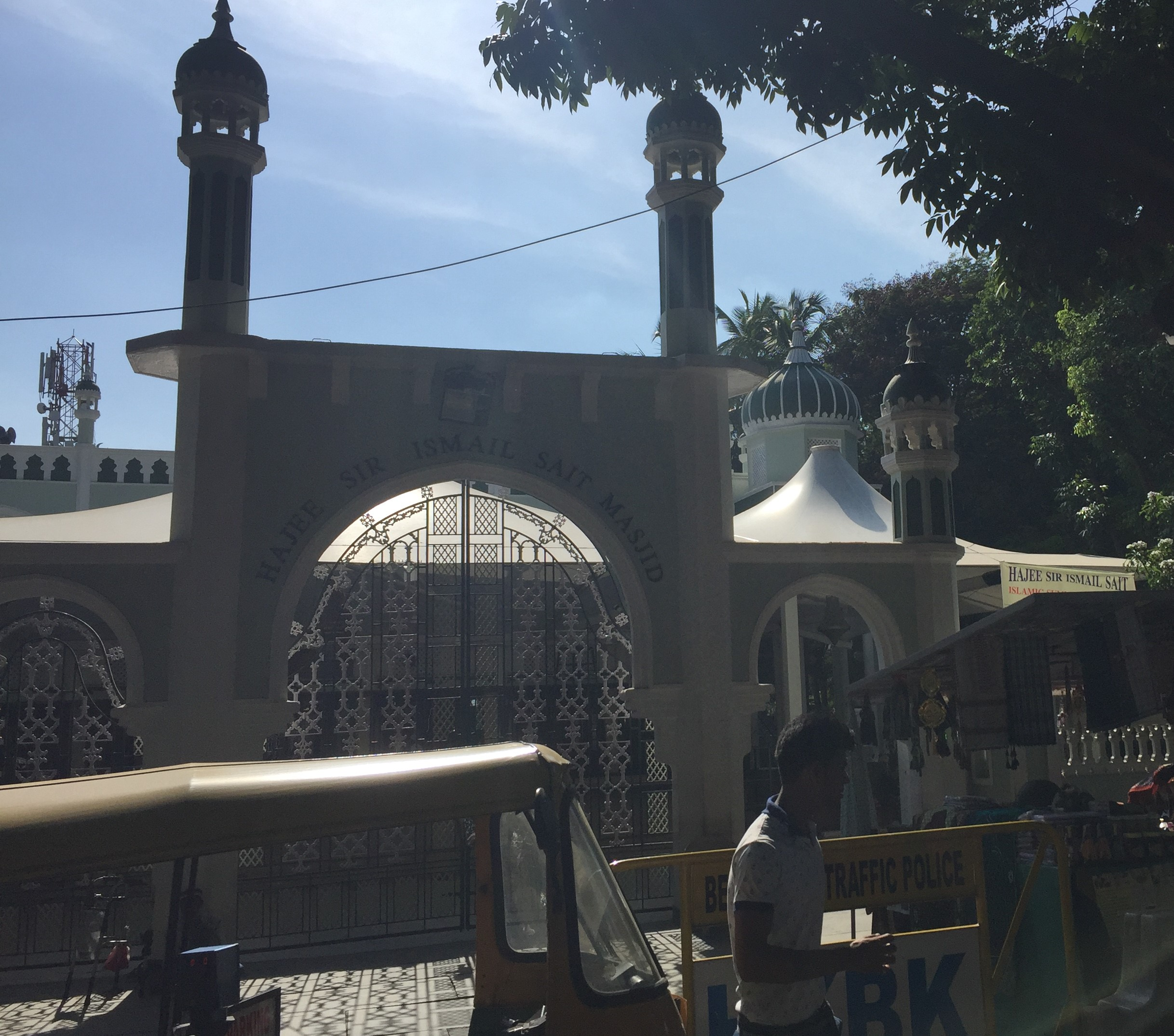
Sir Ismail Sait Mosque, Pulakeshi Nagara

Haji Sir Ismail Sait Mosque (named after Haji Sir Ismail Sait, a prominent Gujarati-speaking Kutchi Memon merchant of Bangalore Cantonment who built the mosque), is located in the posh locality of Fraser Town. It was built at a time when there were only a few Muslims in the area. Haji Sir Ismail Sait arrived in Bangalore in 1870 from Cutch, Gujarat, with his parents. After the demise of his father, he started a small business on his own in 1874, and prospered expanding his business around Bangalore and also Madras, trading in goods and Kerosene. At the same time, he was involved in philanthropy and charitable work. Haji Sir Ismail Sait was honoured by the Mysore Government with the title ‘Fakrut-Tujjar', and the British Government in london knighted him at Buckingham Palace in recognition of his philanthropy. Haji Sir Ismail Sait also served as a member of the Madras Presidency Legislative Council in 1911. Sir Ismail Sait also founded the Sir Ismail Sait Government Urdu Model Primary Boys and Girls School, an Urdu Primary School on Mosque Road and the Gosha Hospital at Shivajinagar.

=== Bangalore East Railway Station ===
Bangalore East railway station is an old British-era railway station surrounded by Pottery Road, Kumaraswamy Naidu Road, Murgesha Mudaliar Road and Kenchappa Road. It is a small quaint station located in Pulakeshi Nagara. This station is very convenient for residents travelling towards Kolar Gold Fields or returning from Chennai. Express and mail trains did not stop here until the 1920s. The station is now renovated with a larger platform. Adjacent to the railway station is the Bangalore East Football Grounds, which nowadays is more used for playing cricket.

=== Arcot Ramasamy Mudaliar ===
Hajee Sir Ismail Sait and Mr. Mudaliar together were leading industrialists who developed Fraser Town. Their for-profit and non-profit institutions set up in Fraser Town still stand as testament to their work toward the development of modern Bengaluru.

== Gallery ==
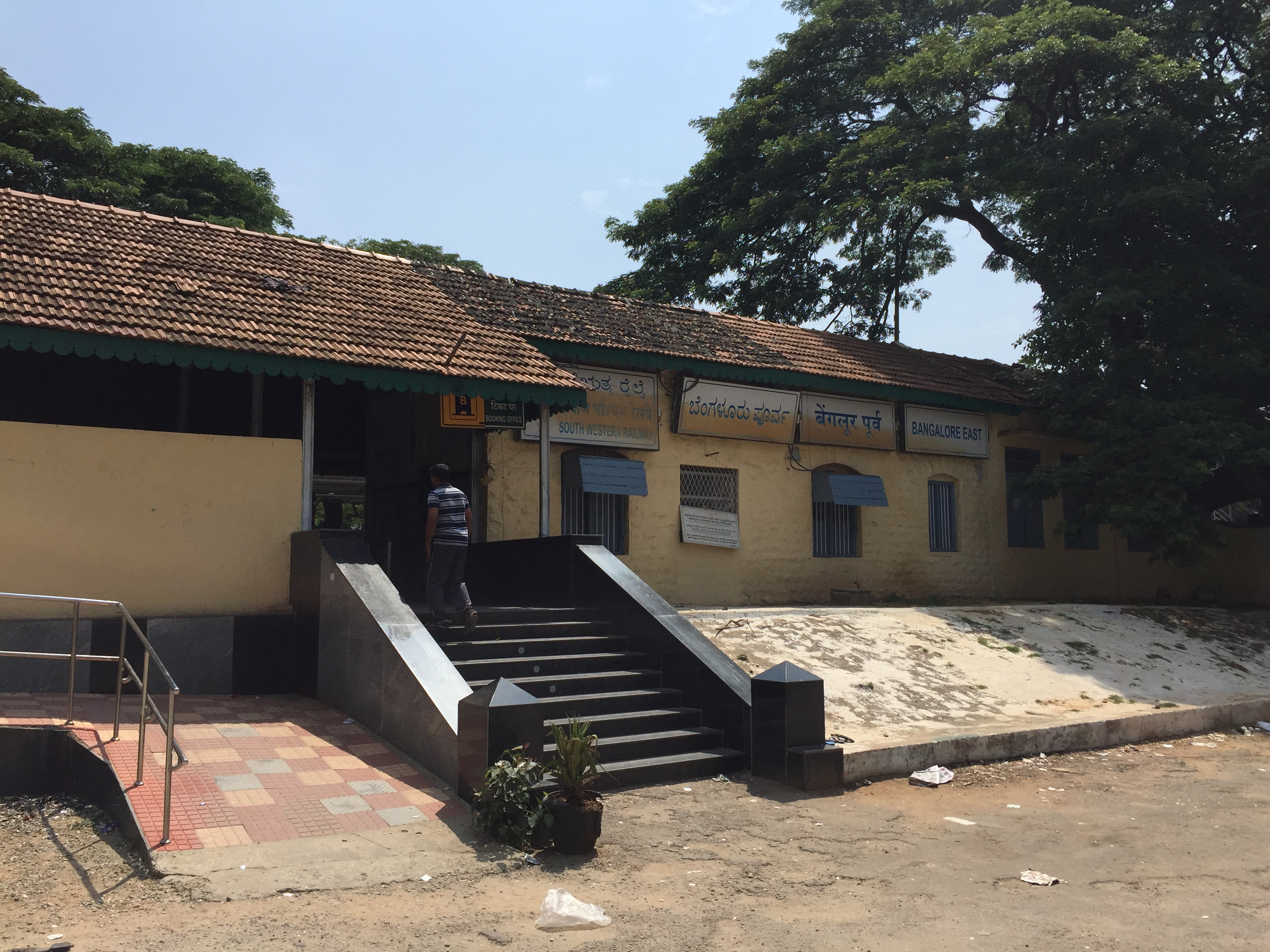
Bangalore East Railway Station. The original British period stone building.

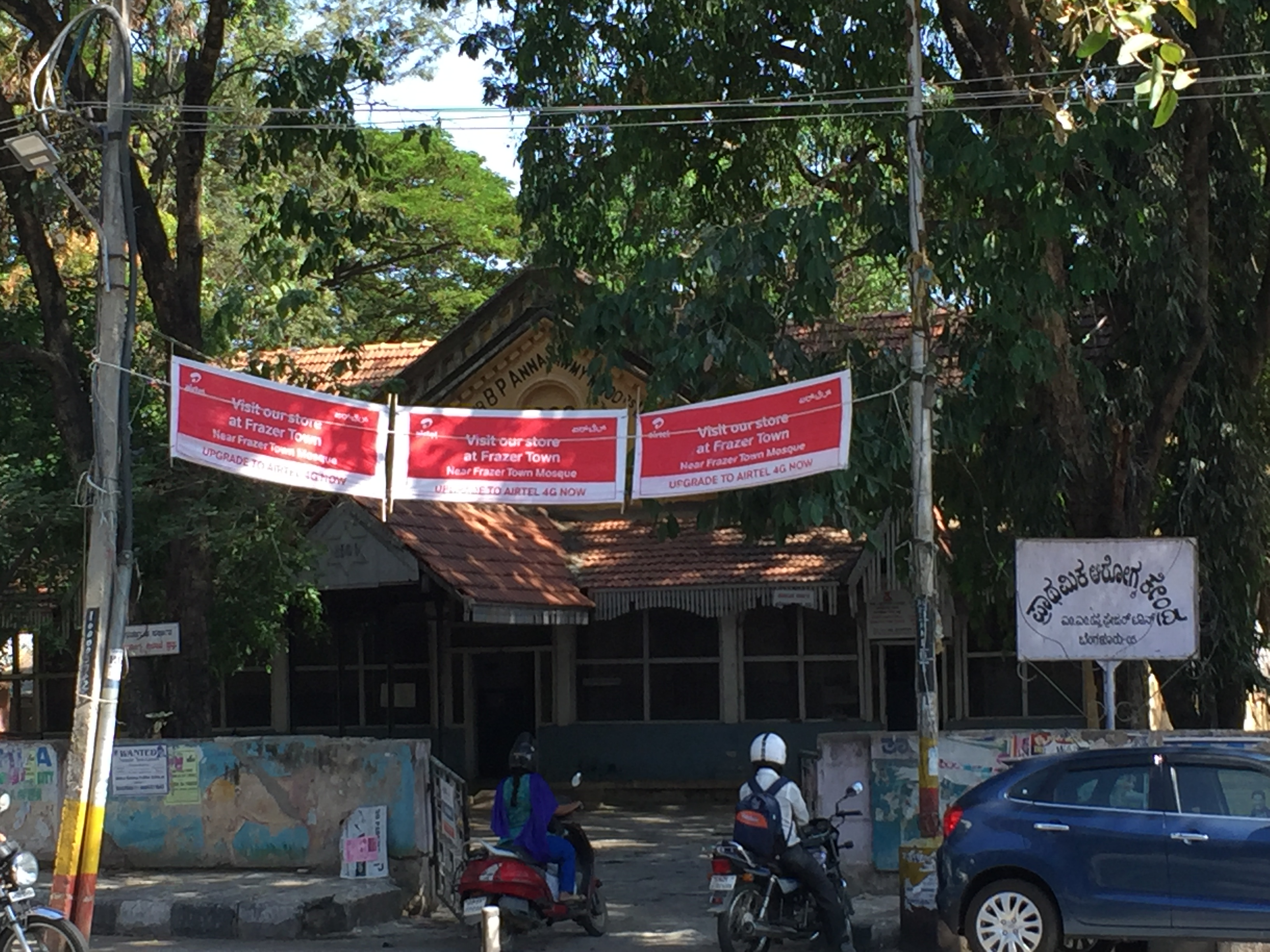
MM Road, Pulakeshi Nagara

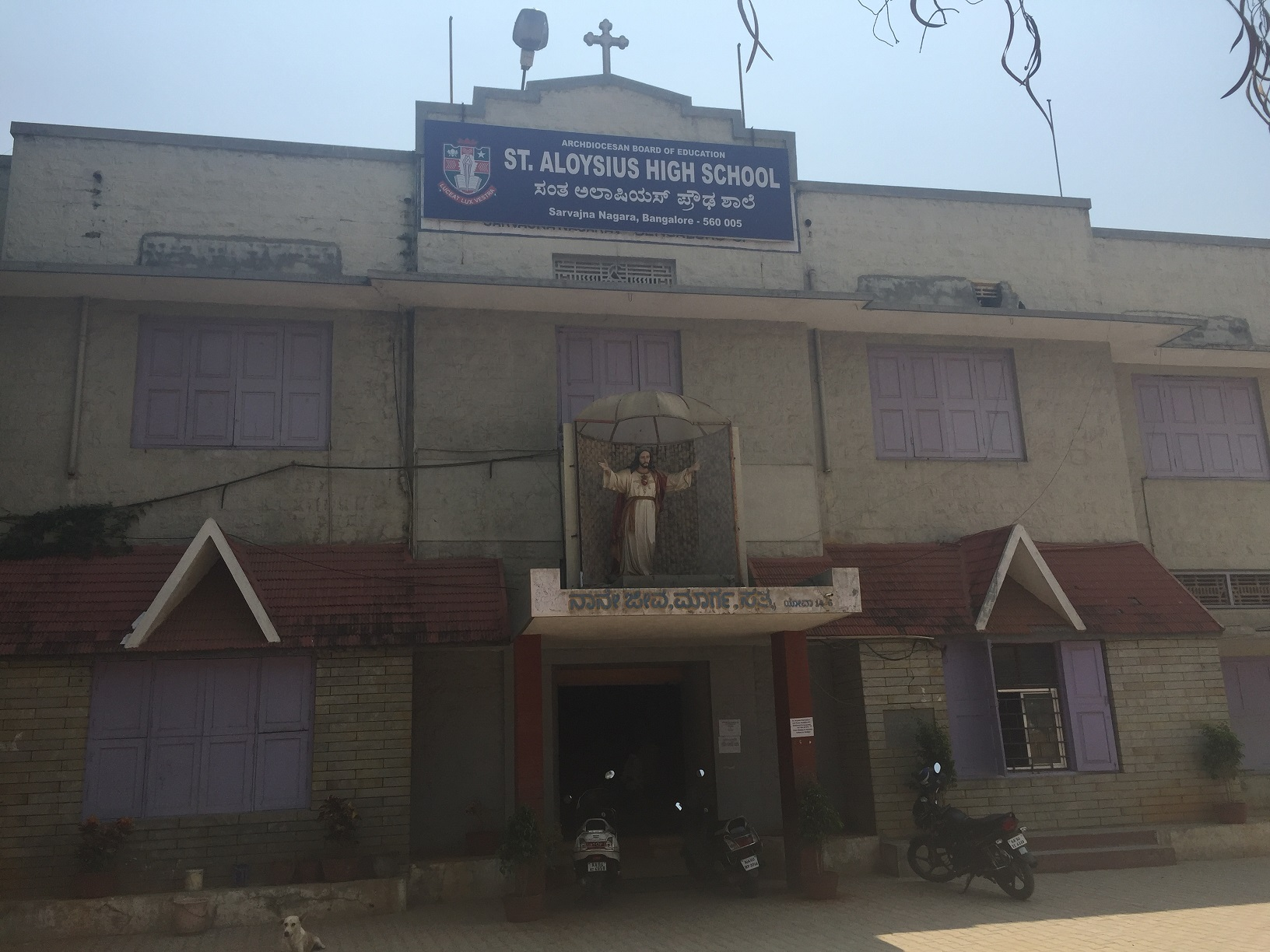
St. Aloysius High School

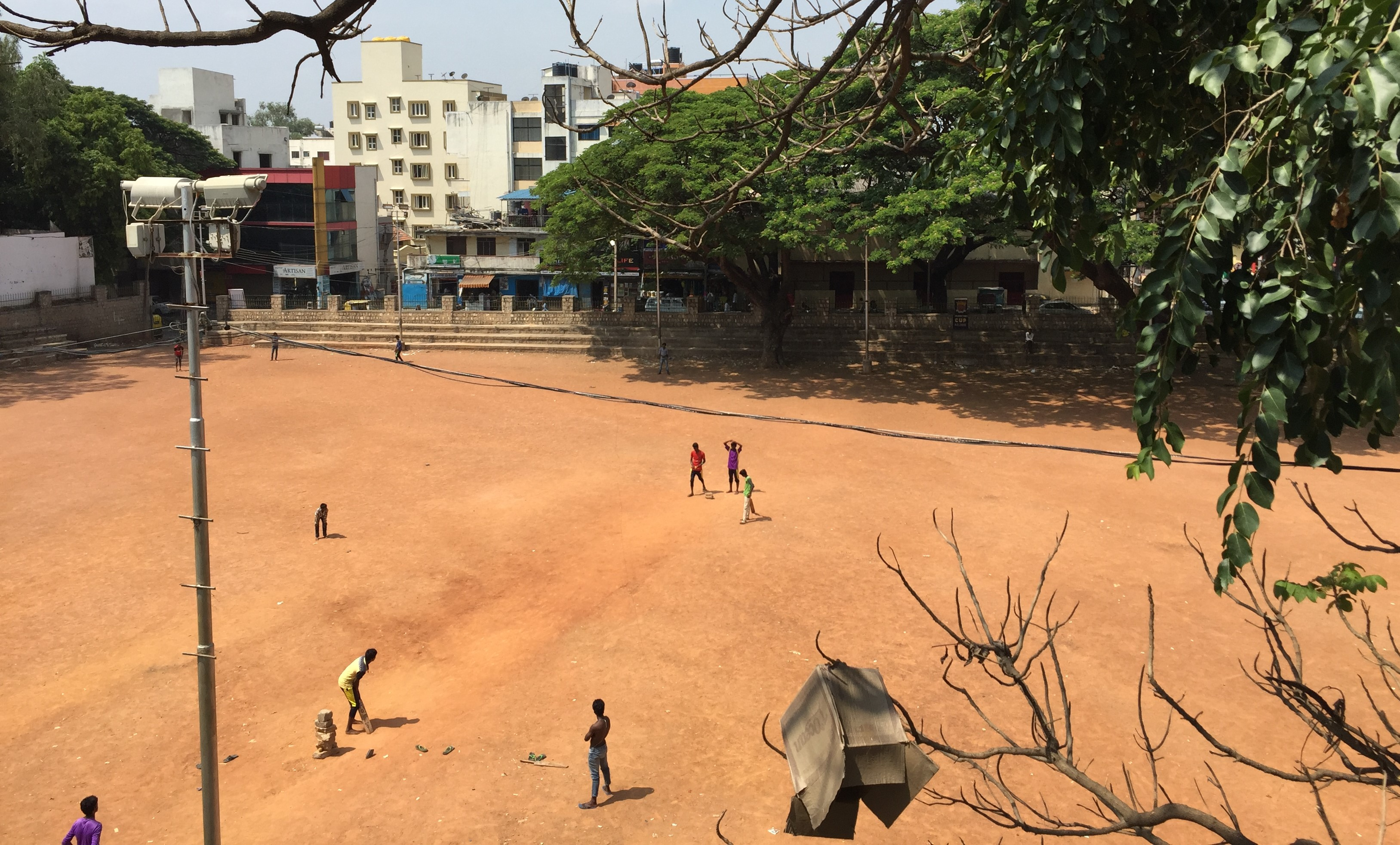
Bangalore East Football Ground

== Notable institutions ==
- Annaswamy Mudaliar's High School, between Moore Road and Mosque Road
- Clarence High School
- Goodwills Girls School, Promenade Road
- St. Aloysius High School, Assaye Road
- St Anthony's Boys School, St. John's Hill
- St. Francis Xavier Girls High School, St. John's Hill
- St. Germain High School, Pulakeshi Nagara
- St John's High School
- St. Joseph's Convent (Rajamma Thambu Chetty School), St. John's Hill
- St Rock's Girls High School, St. John's Hill
- Florence High School, Viviani Road.
