= Clarence High School (India) =

Private school in Bangalore, India

Location
- Pottery Road, Richard's Town; Bangalore, Karnataka, 560005; India

Information
- Type: High school
- Motto: Our Utmost for the Highest
- Established: 1914; 112 years ago
- Founder: Alfred and Walter Redwood
- Chairman: Anup Soans
- Gender: Mixed
- Age: 5 to 17
- Houses: Theobald; Redwood; Wilcox
- Colours: Blue and Yellow
- Publication: The Clarencian, The Clarence Pulse
- Website: www.clarencehighschool.in

Clarence High School (CHS) is a private Christian minority school in Bangalore East for girls and boys. It is located in Richard's Town in Bangalore, Karnataka, India, and is for day scholars. It has classes from Montessori until the 12th grade and is in the Indian Certificate of Secondary Education syllabus.

== History ==
Clarence High School was founded in 1914 by the Redwood brothers, Alfred and Walter, two Englishmen, who named it after their own school in Somerset, United Kingdom. The Redwoods left Bangalore in the 1960s and were no longer involved in the institution’s management. The school’s alumni raised money to construct the Flack Memorial Auditorium, named after one of the school’s former principals, A C Flack, who came from Australia in 1946.

In 2014, Clarence High School became the fifth Anglo-Indian origin school in Bangalore to reach the 100-year milestone, after St Joseph’s (1858), Bishop Cotton (1865), Cathedrals (1866) and Baldwin (1880) schools. Fr Jose Aikara CM, chairman of the Council for the Indian School Certificate Examinations (CISCE), inaugurated the centenary celebrations.

=== School Heads ===
Some of the former school principals are A. C. Flack, David Coates, M. T. Thomas, and Benny Joseph.

== Campus ==
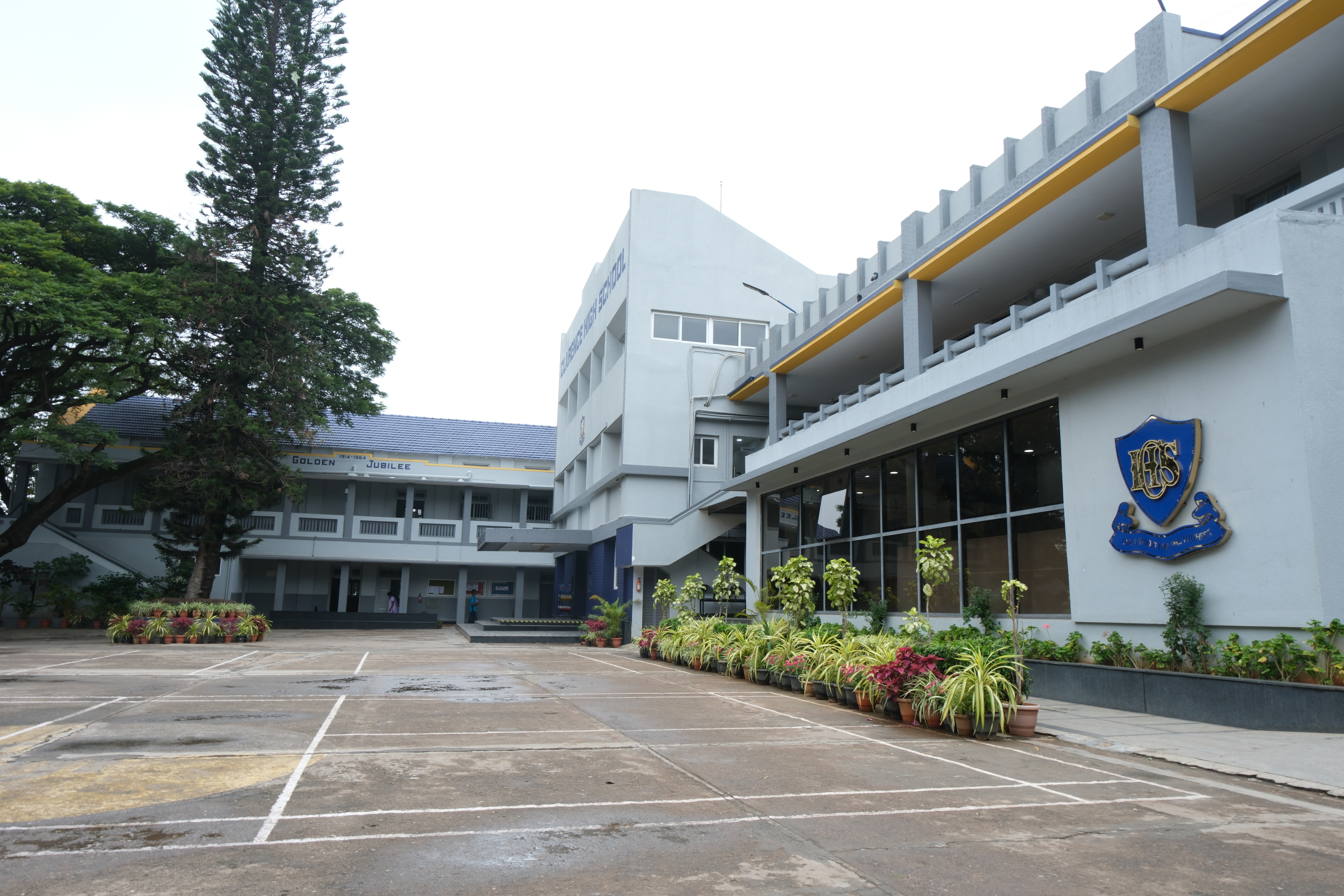
Clarence High School, 2026

For a while the school was located in a bungalow on Palm Road (now M. M. Road, near the Fraser Town Mosque). This building now houses the Fraser Town Post Office. The school is now located on Pottery Road, at a junction near Richard's Park. It lends its name to a bus stop for buses moving towards and from M. S. Nagar, Lingarajpuram, Banaswadi, Kammanahalli, Kalyannagar and Hennur. While the main gate faces Pottery Road, the side gates face Viviani Road and Mosque Road Extension. The fourth side faces apartments that line John Armstrong Road.

The school has a number of buildings, one of the newest among them being the William Carey block. This block has several of the classrooms, the laboratories, the physical education department, the music room and faces the playground field. The Coates library houses 9 000 books. There are a number of laboratories for the various science subjects (Chemistry, Biology, Physics and Computers). The Flack Memorial Assembly Hall can house around a thousand people. The kindergarten students have a separate block (KG Block) and playground. The Stewards Block, a building for the Special Needs Department, has a large clock on top which is visible from the roads adjacent to the school campus. The campus has several trees, the most prominent among them being a Christmas tree and a Peepal tree.

== School motto ==
The school motto is "Our Utmost For The Highest". The philosophy of the founders is also summed up in a verse from the Bible - "The Reverence of The Lord is the Beginning of Wisdom." This is taken from the book of Proverbs (chapter 9, verse 10).

== School song ==
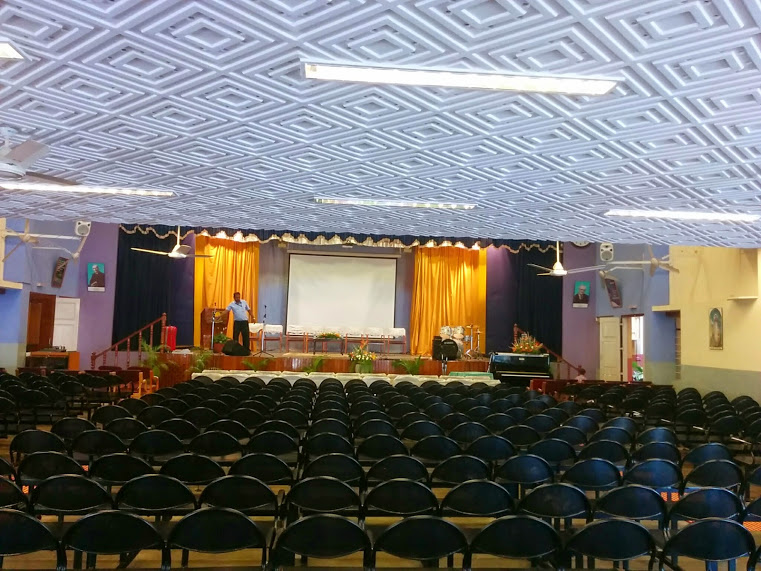
The Clarence High School (Bangalore, India) Flack Auditorium Hall

The school hymn, composed by G.C. Rogers, begins with the words: "We thank Thee now O Father"

== Academics ==
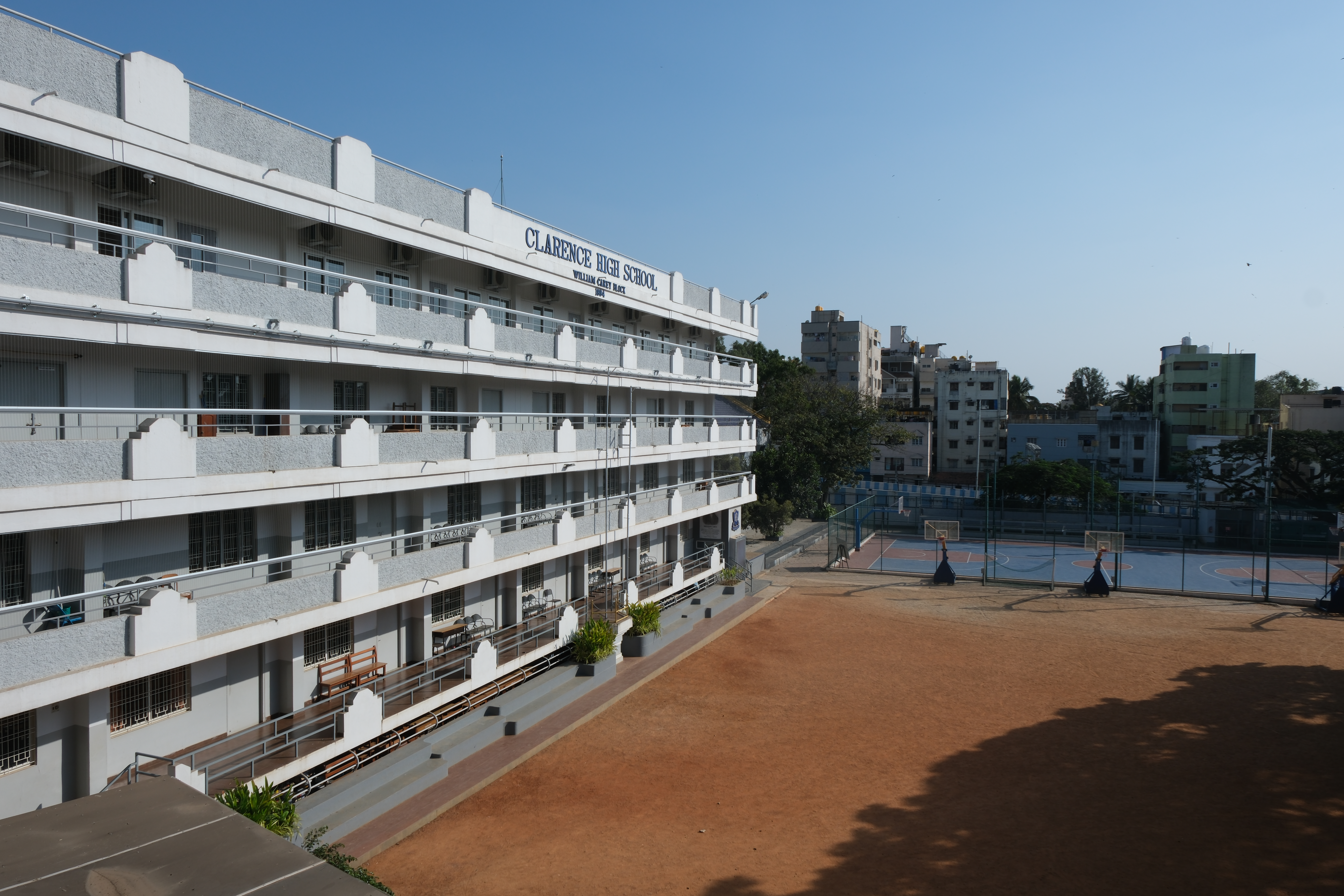
Carey Block, 2026

The school practises a five-day week schedule. The day begins at 8:00 a.m. (formerly at 8:35 a.m.) with a daily assembly which is normally twenty-five minutes long and is conducted within the Flack Auditorium. The lunch break is between 12:30 p.m. and 1:00 p.m. (formerly between 12:35 p.m. and 1:05 p.m). The day ends at 3:00 p.m for students from class 3 onwards and 2:30 p.m. for the kindergarten students. It used to end at 3:10 for the junior pupils (until 6th Std.) and at 3:45 for the senior pupils.

The entry level is at the Preparatory class, equivalent to the Upper Kindergarten (UKG) class, meant for five-year-old children. The Preparatory, First and Second Standards are called the Kindergarten with classrooms in the KG block along with a separate library and playground (called the KG Lane). The rest of the school use the school field and the school library which houses several thousands of books. A basketball court and a few more buildings also form part of the school premises.

The first language is English, the second language was formerly Hindi or French but now Kannada is made the second language for pupils from prep onwards from 2018 as the state government has made a rule urging schools to do so. The tenth standard examinations are conducted in the ICSE (Indian Council for Secondary Examinations) format. The eleventh and the twelfth standards are divided into Science, Commerce and Arts streams. The twelfth standard examinations are conducted in the ISC format (Indian School Certificate). Both public examinations are conducted by the Council for the Indian School Certificate Examinations Board.

A Community Interest Company (CIC) board has also been established.

== Sports ==
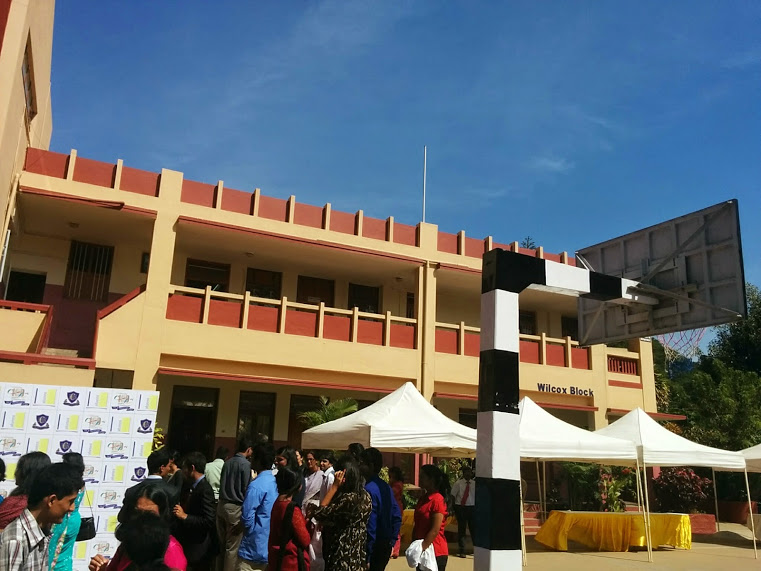
The Basketball court and the Wilcox Block, Clarence High School (Bangalore, India)

The school has a separate playground, called Assaye Field, beside Assaye Road. The school organises and conducts the Clarencian shield, the prestigious inter-school Basketball tournament, every year around the months of October and November. Football, cricket and throw-ball are some of the other team events that the students of Clarence High play.

== Houses ==
The house system is a feature common to Public schools in India (based on an equivalent system in England). The Houses distribute a school community into smaller, more personal units, and thereby build a sense of loyalty and competition. Traditionally there were three houses: Barton, Redwood, and Theobald. Their team colors are green, red, and blue respectively. Wilcox, a new fourth house was made with the team color yellow. Their mottoes are: "Never Despair" for the Barton house, "Ad Astra" for the Redwood house (Aim for the stars in Latin), "Never Give In" for the Theobald house, and "Press Onward" for the Wilcox house. The Kindergarten children also belong to one of the above houses.

== Controversy ==
In April 2022, the school was in the midst of a controversy for allegedly forcing all students including non-Christian students to carry bible in their school bags. Few Hindu organizations called this a violation of Supreme Court guidelines and violation of Article 25. Following this the state government announced its intent to inspect the curriculum being taught by Christian educational institutes in the state. The school defended saying this was not a new practice and students were taught the bible as any other subject textbooks, which past alumni verified and defended as well.

== Notable alumni ==
- Dino Morea, actor
- Rahil Azam, actor
- Nitin Kushalappa, author
