= Lindsay Sangster Rogers =

New Zealand surgeon and WWII medical officer

Lindsay Sangster Rogers FRCS, FRACS
- Born: 1902; Otago, New Zealand
- Died: 8 June 1962 (aged 59–60); New Caledonia
- Occupations: Surgeon, medical officer, academic, author
- Notable work: Guerilla Surgeon (1957)

Lindsay Sangster Rogers (1902–1962) was a New Zealand surgeon, military medical officer, academic and author, best known for his service with the Yugoslav Partisans during World War II and for his memoir Guerilla Surgeon.

== Early life and education ==
Rogers was born in Dunedin, New Zealand, in 1902. He studied medicine at the University of Otago, graduating MB ChB in 1927. At his graduation he was awarded the Medical Travelling Scholarship, the Batchelor Memorial Medal, the Medal for Senior Clinical Medicine, the Medal for Senior Clinical Surgery, and the Marjorie McCallum Medal for Clinical Medicine.

He undertook postgraduate surgical training in the United Kingdom and gained surgical qualifications including FRCS (Edinburgh, 1929), FRCS (England, 1931) and FRACS (1936).

== Medical career ==
Before World War II, Rogers was a resident at Dunedin Hospital and worked in various London hospitals, gaining experience as a clinical surgeon.

== World War II ==
From the beginning of World War II, Rogers served with the British Royal Army Medical Corps. He volunteered for special duty with the British Special Operations Executive (SOE) and was deployed to Yugoslavia to work with the Partisan forces led by Josip Broz Tito.

=== Mission Rogers ===
In Yugoslavia, Rogers tended wounded fighters and civilians under arduous conditions, often operating in caves and forest encampments and helping to establish medical facilities for the guerrilla forces. He acted as an unofficial liaison between Allied forces and the Partisans and was highly regarded by those he served.

Rogers' secret activities in Yugoslavia were detailed in an article in Time Magazine in 1944. His identity was disguised and he was referred to as "Dr X". Quoted in the Ashburton Guardian the same year, the Time article described Dr X as, '[...] a tough New Zealander who asked for a transfer to Yugoslavia after performing 9000 operations in Africa. Marshal Broz told him to set up a 200-cot hospital in a farmhouse. He drove pigs and chickens out of the house and went to work without instruments or medicine. For antiseptic he used salt water. His instruments were a carpenter's hammer, a hacksaw and chisels. To keep up the spirits of the wounded and unanaesthetised men, and to drown the sound of the saw gritting through bone, he ordered boys and girls to sing partisan songs.' The secret identity of "Dr X" – referred to in secure cables as "Dr R" – was revealed to be Lindsay Rogers in an article in the Te Awamutu Courier on 18 October 1944.

He was later awarded the Order of Bravery and the Order of Merit by the Yugoslav government for his wartime service.

== Guerilla Surgeon ==
Rogers recorded his wartime experiences in the memoir Guerilla Surgeon, first published in London in 1957. The book provides a first-hand account of surgical and medical support in guerrilla warfare settings and has been republished several times, most recently in 2024.

== Post-war career ==
After the war, Rogers was appointed Professor of Clinical Surgery at the Royal School of Medicine in Baghdad, where he taught from about 1945 until 1950, and also acted as a surgical adviser to the Iraqi Army during the 1948 Arab–Israeli War. He later returned to New Zealand and re-joined a general medical practice in Te Awamutu where he was active in local affairs and served as a borough councillor. In May 1957 he married Isobel Mary Anderson whom he had first met years earlier when they were both working at Dunedin Hospital.

Following his death in 1962, their 58 ha farm at Hairini was bequeathed to Te Awamutu College for use as a training farm for high school students. The farm was sold in November 2023.

== Antiquities collection ==
While in the Middle East, Rogers developed an interest in classical and Near Eastern antiquities, and he supported the Otago Museum's collections through donations of artefacts, including pieces acquired during his time in Iraq. In 1976, several priceless artefacts were stolen from the family home in a robbery during which Rogers's widow Isobel was tied to a chair.

== Death ==
Rogers died in 1962 in Nouméa, New Caledonia, when his car plunged from the road into a river during heavy rain while he was on holiday. Rogers and an elderly friend, Mrs Downes, drowned in the incident. Isobel Rogers escaped through an open window.

== Selected works ==
- Guerilla Surgeon. London: Collins, 1957.
