= Russell Market =

Shopping market in Bangalore, India

Coordinates: 12.98496°N 77.60590°E

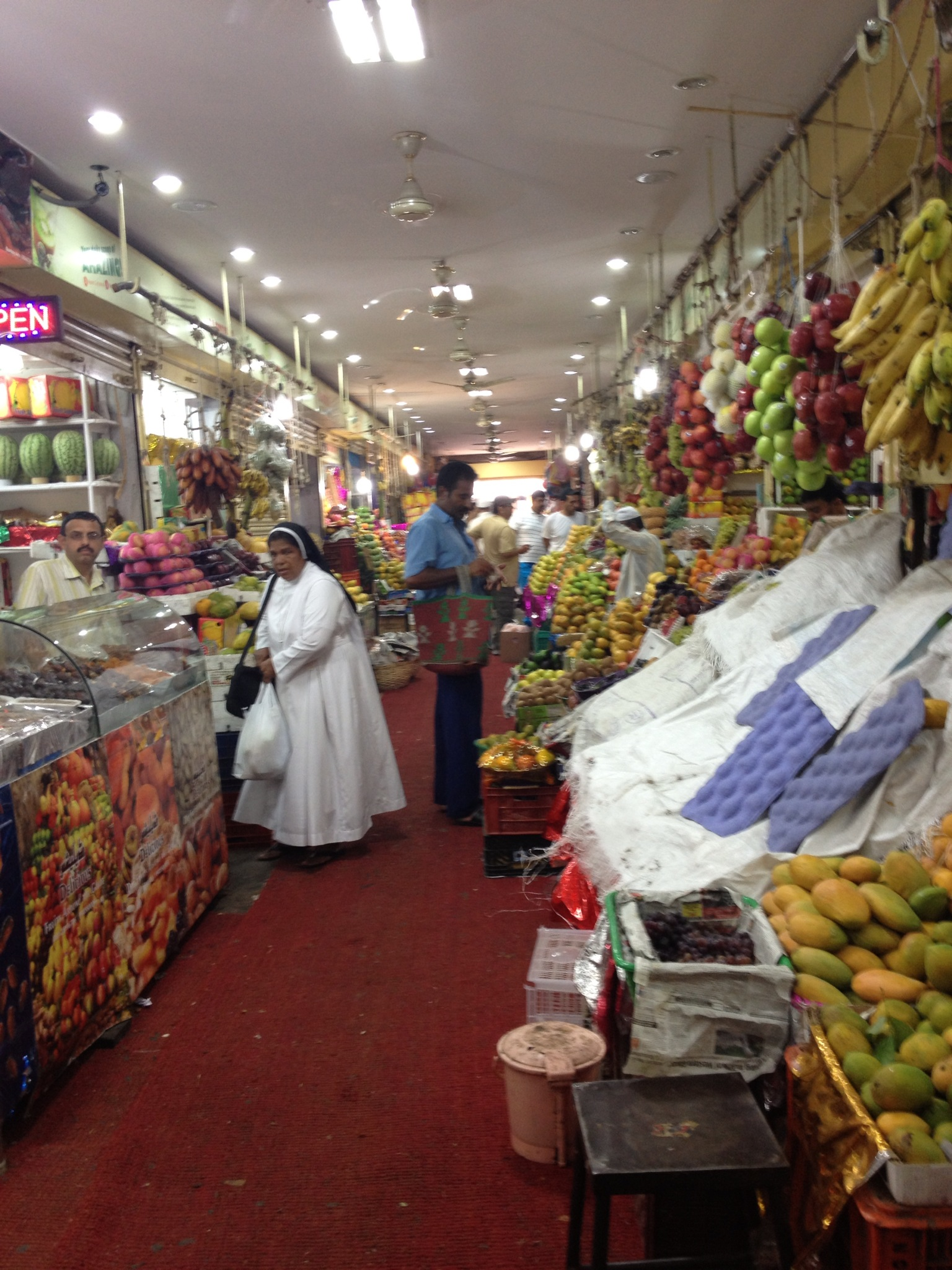
Russell Market, Bangalore Cantonment

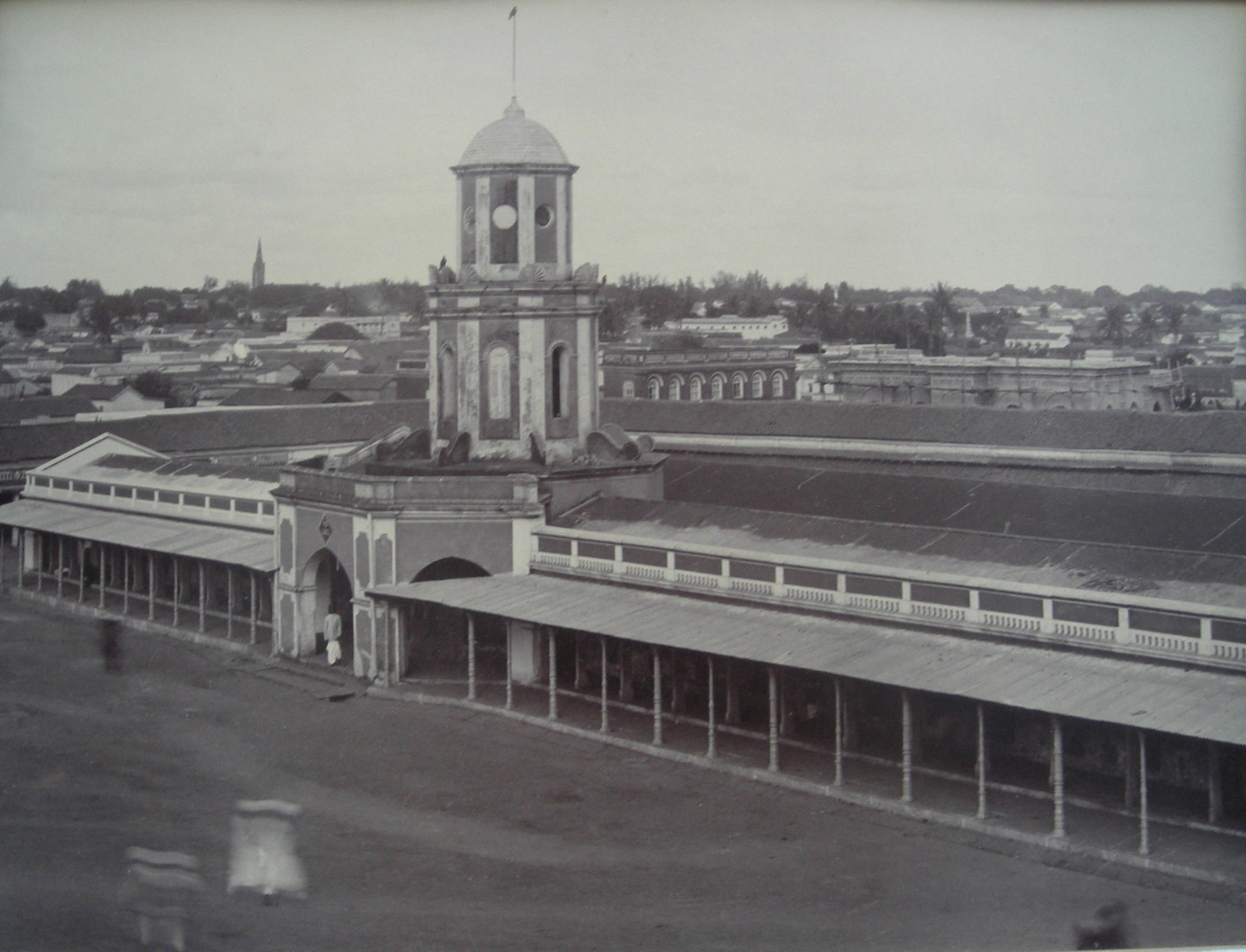
The Market in Bangalore - c1880's (Predecessor to the Russell Market), the spire of St. John's can be seen on the top left

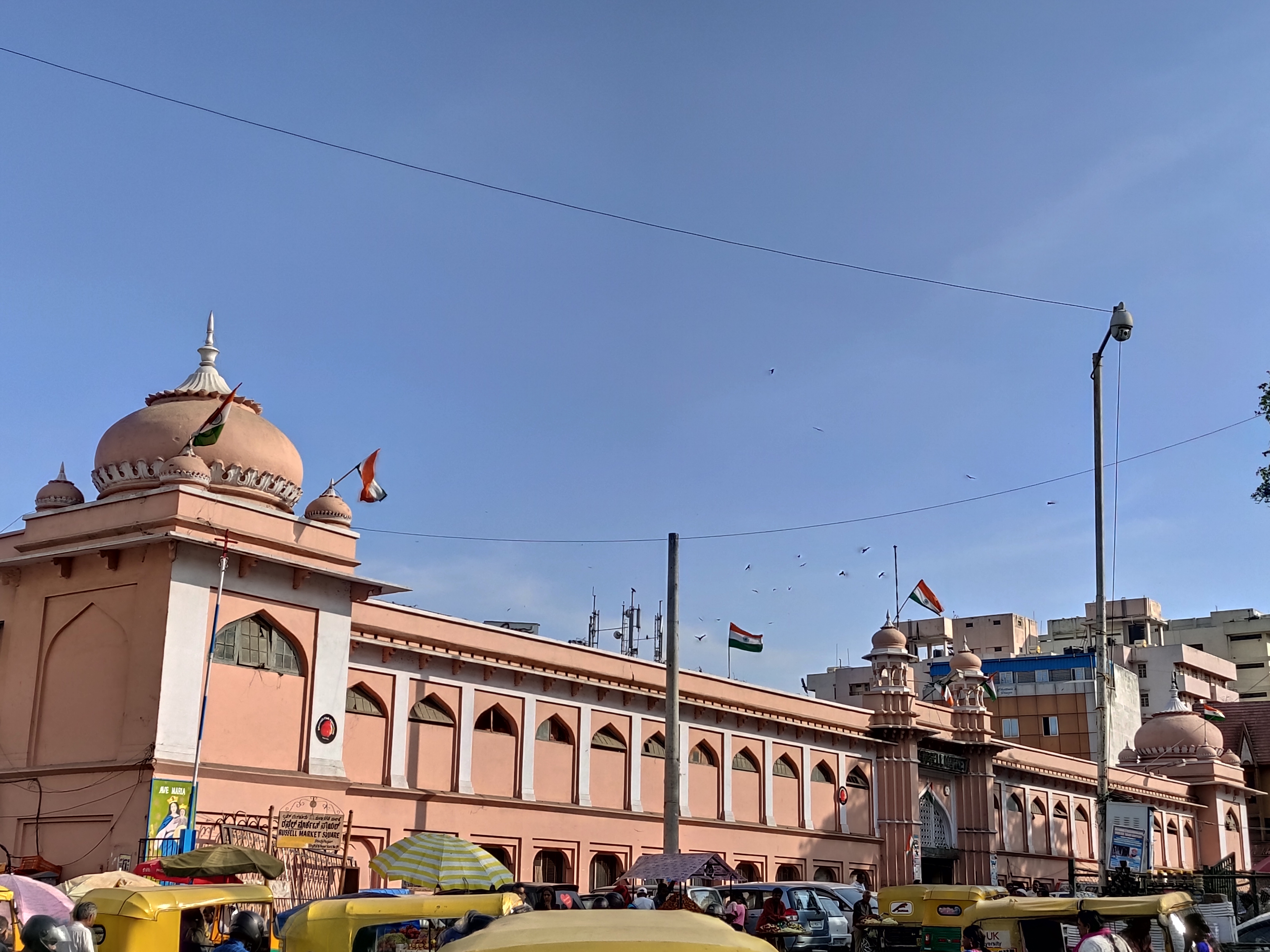
Russel Market, Bengaluru

Russell Market is a shopping market in Bangalore, built in 1927 by the British and inaugurated in 1933 by Ismail Sait. It is named of the then Municipal commissioner T. B. Russell.

== Fire ==
On 26 February 2012, a fire started in the market, in the early hours of Saturday, gutting 123 shops and causing loss of Rs89.2 lakh to the shop owners. Initial investigations reveal that the fire broke out because of short-circuit.
