= Stuart Memorial, Dunedin =

Memorial in Dunedin, New Zealand

Stuart Memorial
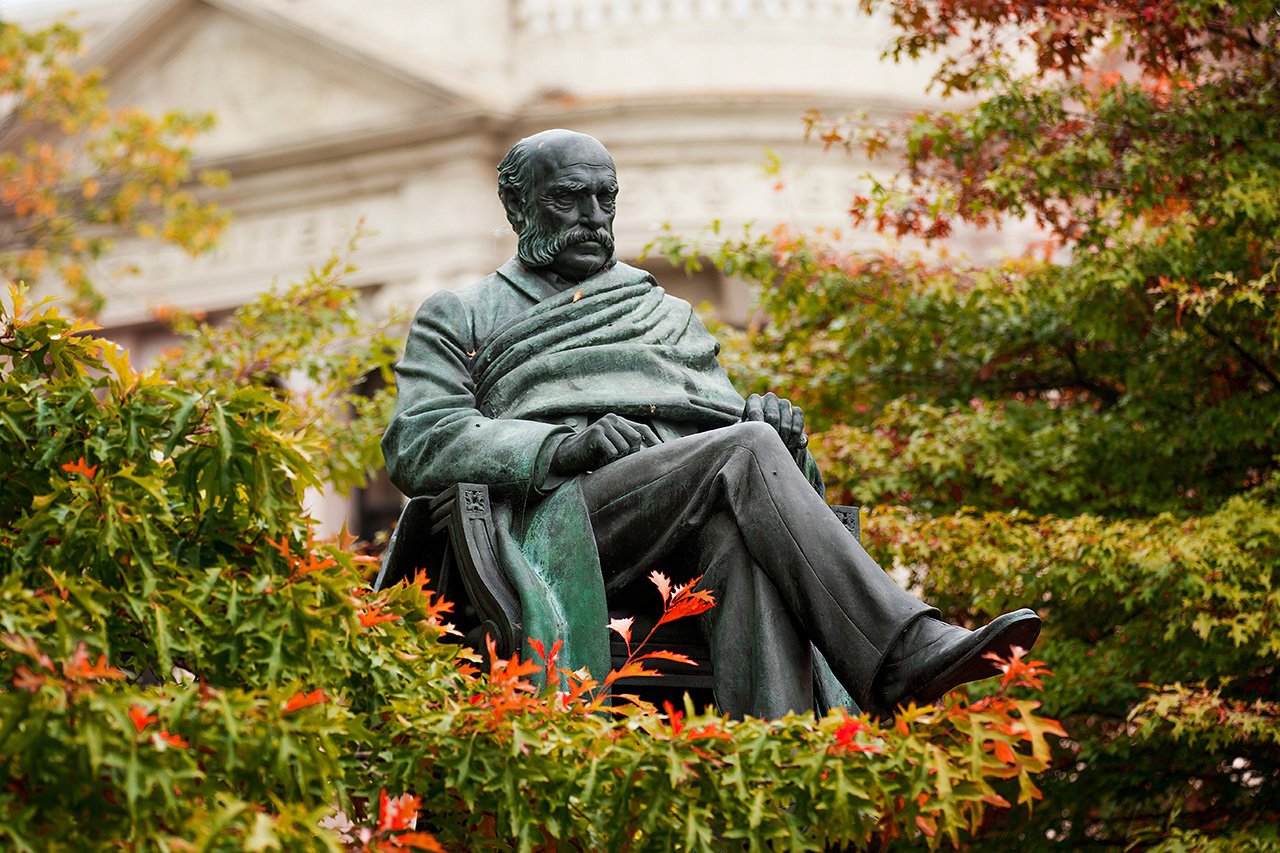
- The statue of Stuart surrounded by trees, 2021
- Interactive map of Stuart Memorial
- Location: Queens Gardens, Dunedin, New Zealand
- Coordinates: 45°52′39.5″S 170°30′11.5″E
- Designer: William Leslie Morison
- Material: Statue: bronze; Plinth: concrete, granite, sandstone, andesite
- Opening date: 22 June 1898

Heritage New Zealand – Category 1
- Designated: 11 November 1987
- Reference no.: 4758

The Stuart Memorial is a statue of clergyman Donald McNaughton Stuart located in central Dunedin, New Zealand. It sits adjacent to Queens Gardens, close to a statue of Queen Victoria. The memorial is a bronze statue of Stuart seated in a solemn pose, atop a large concrete, granite, and andesite plinth. Stuart was a locally renowned minister, educationalist, and community leader, and shortly after his death in 1894, a memorial committee was established. After several months of community fundraising, the committee contracted Wellington-based artist William Leslie Morison to model the statue, the first major civic commission given to a New Zealand artist. With a plaster model by Morison used as the base, the statue was cast at the Moore foundry near London.

Unveiled in June 1898, the memorial was soon subject to various proposals for relocation, either to the Early Settlers' Hall or Knox Church, due to obstruction by surrounding lamp posts and proposals for other statues at the location. It was ultimately placed atop a taller plinth in 1922, following a temporary removal during the installation of electric tram lines. A proposal circulated in the late 2010s to move the statue to the grounds of the University of Otago, where Stuart served as chancellor. The statue remains at its Queens Gardens location, and underwent cleaning and restoration work in 2020.

== Background ==
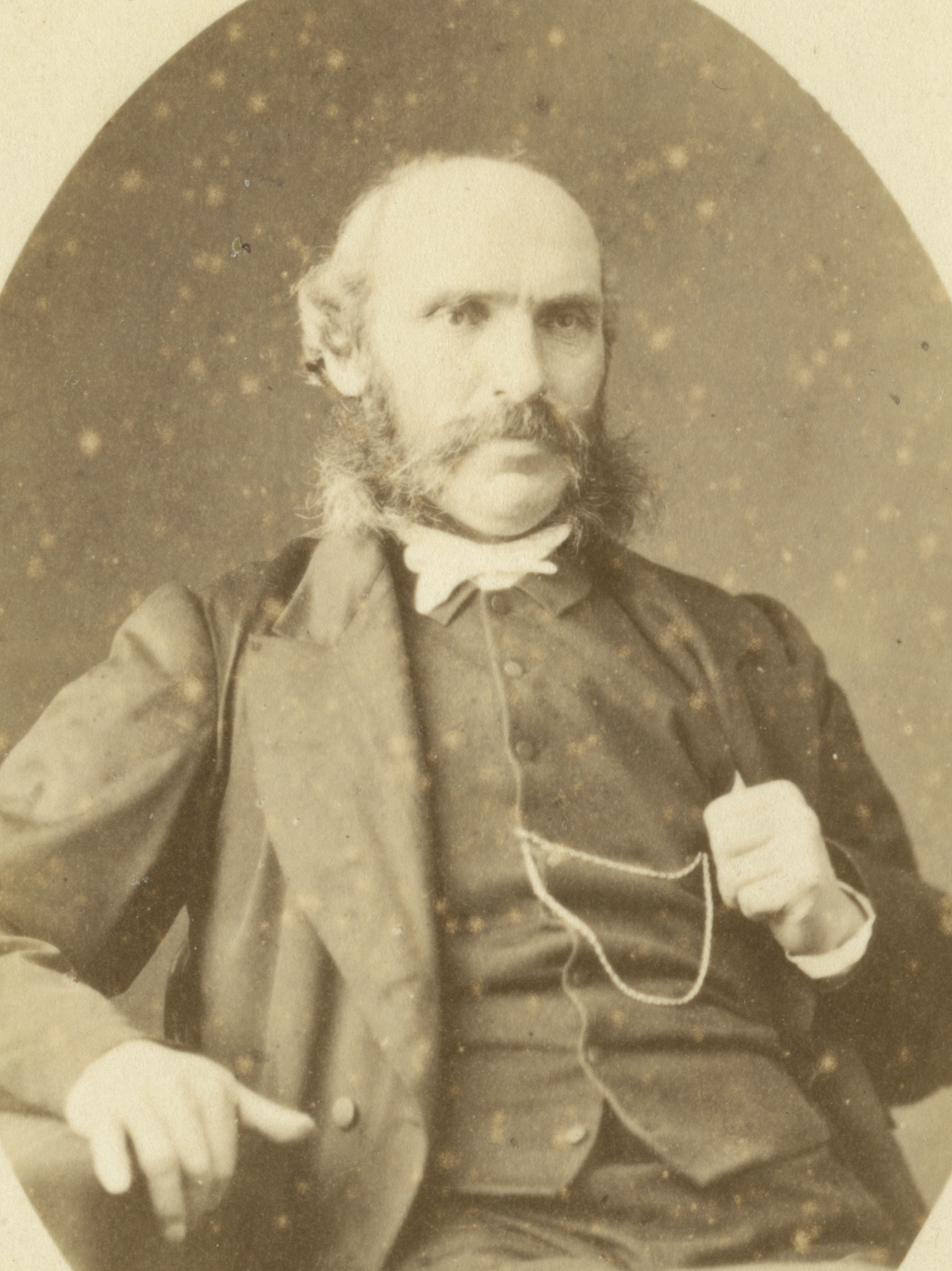
Donald Stuart, c. 1869

Donald McNaughton Stuart was a Presbyterian minister and educationalist. Born 1819 in Perthshire, Scotland, he was trained as a theologian and schoolteacher. Emigrating to Dunedin in 1860, Stuart was appointed as the first minister of Knox Church. He served as the chairman of the Otago Boys' and Otago Girls' High School boards. He served as Chancellor of the University of Otago from 1879 until his death in May 1894.

Stuart reached great popularity during his ministry in Dunedin. He was noted for officiating marriages refused by other ministers, such as interdenominational relationships. The Otago Witness, describing Stuart, stated "There is no man in New Zealand, probably, that has christened, married, and buried more people." Six thousand mourners took part in a large funeral procession for the minister with an estimated 15,000–20,000 spectators.

=== Memorial committee ===
A memorial committee was organized in late May, shortly following Stuart's death, and began fundraising for a memorial. Public support for the committee was expressed by local officials of various towns in Otago, such as Oamaru and Queenstown. By August, the committee began to consider the construction of a commemorative statue, and investigated whether a suitable artist in Australia or New Zealand could be commissioned to design the memorial. William Leslie Morison, an artist from Wellington, was selected by the committee to design the statue. The statue was the first major civic commission of a New Zealand-based artist. A design was finalized by March 1895, featuring a seated Stuart. Morison had never met Stuart, but by working from photographs was able to create a "surprisingly successful" likeness.

Its location at Queens Gardens (then called "the Triangle") was selected by June 1896. Following the construction and shipment of a plaster model by Morison, the statue was cast at the Moore foundry near London and shipped to the colony. It was unveiled on 22 June 1898.

== Composition ==
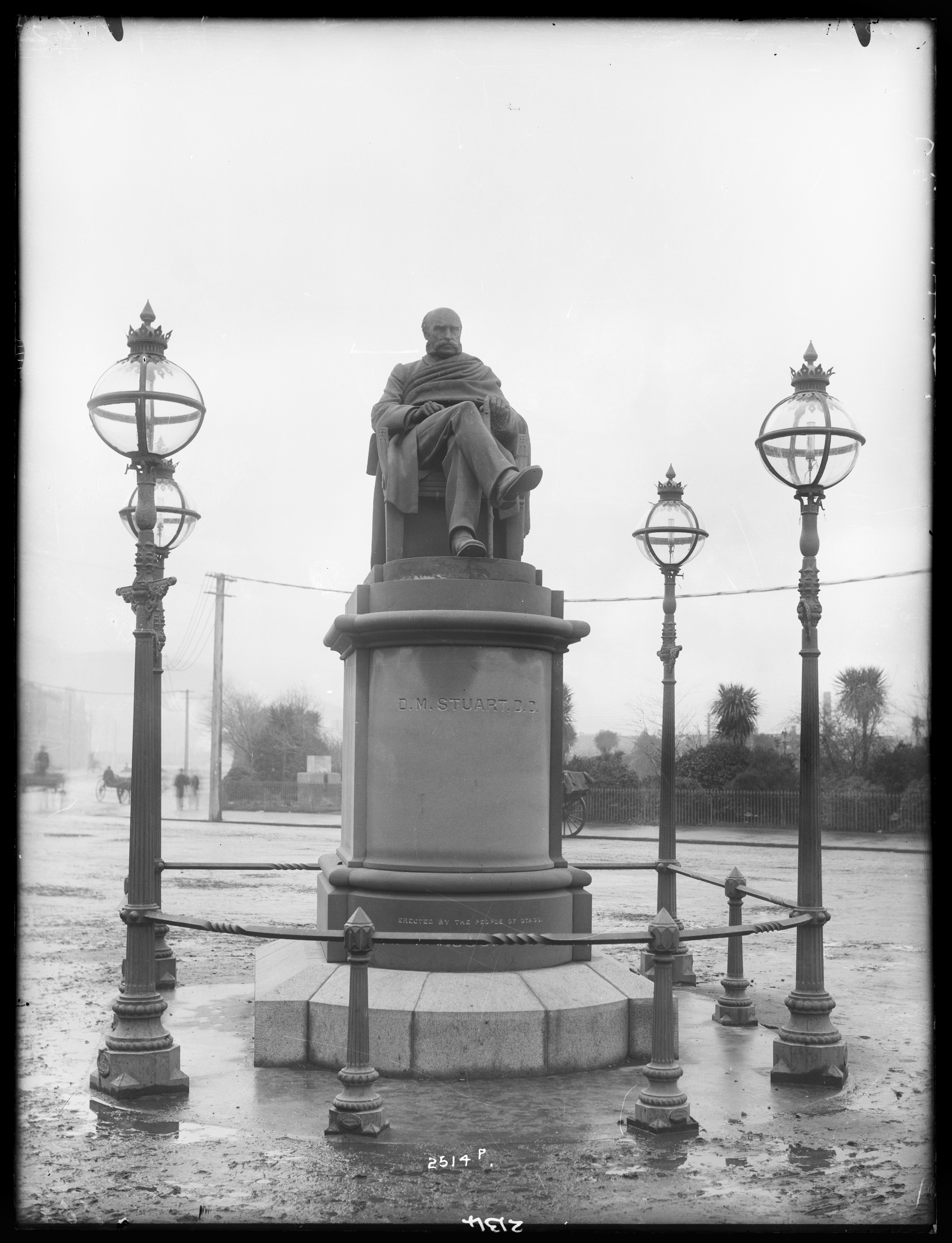
The statue on its original plinth, prior to 1922

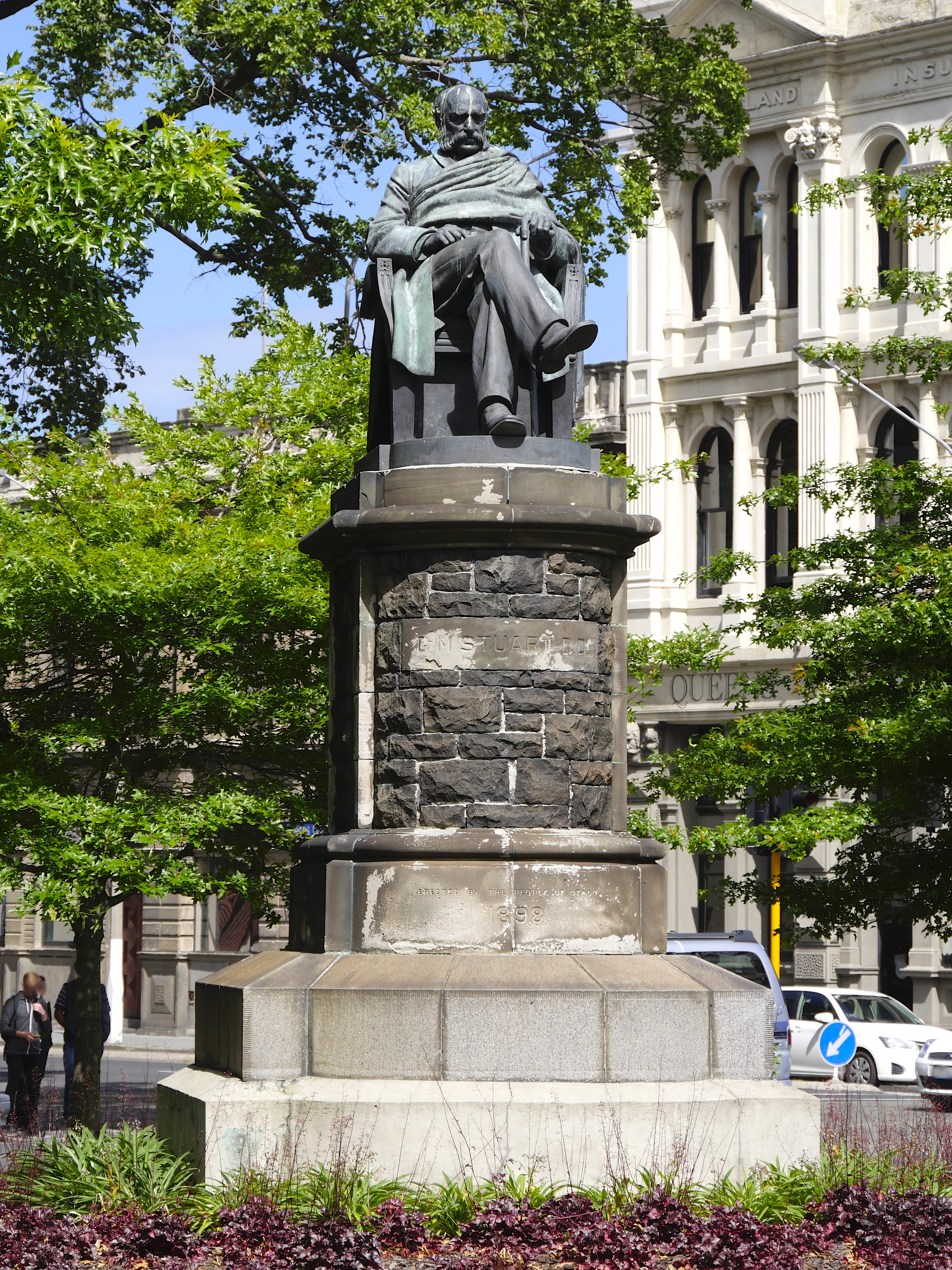
The statue on its current plinth, 2017

The bronze statue features Stuart seated atop a curule chair, holding a walking stick. Stuart wears a shepherd's plaid around his shoulders, a garment that he wore frequently. His pose is described by Heritage New Zealand as "solemn and brooding". The original pedestal is made of concrete and granite, with the later version additionally incorporating andesite and Tasmanian sandstone. The monument's inscription reads "D M Stuart, Erected by the people of Otago, 1898". The statue is 2.1 metres (7 ft) high, initially on a pedestal around 3.4 metres (11 ft). Since the plinth was raised to 5 metres in 1922, the total height of the monument measures around 7 metres.

== History ==
The statue was initially surrounded by lamp posts, but these obstructed the visibility of the memorial, leading to proposals requesting the statue be either raised or relocated. Thomas Hocken wrote that, due to its presence at the "best and most prominent monumental site in the city", the statue should be moved and replaced with a monument to a more prominent figure such as Captain Cook or Queen Victoria. In 1908, the Dunedin City Council proposed moving the memorial to the northern end of the Early Settlers' Hall (now the Toitū Otago Settlers Museum), where it would possibly be more visible. Other proposals recommended moving the statue to Knox Church itself, but these were rejected due to the memorial's commemoration of Stuart as a community leader, rather than purely a minister. Various members of the original memorial committee were consulted by the city council. While no consensus on where to move the statue (or whether to keep it at its original location) was reached, the city council voted 6 to 4 to raise the statue to a greater height if it was moved in the future.

Following the installation of electric tram lines in 1922, the statue was removed, but was ultimately re-erected the next month on its original location. It was placed upon a stone plinth 1.5 metres taller, later described in the Otago Daily Times as "slightly pompous". It was also turned so as to face towards a nearby statue of Queen Victoria. The memorial site was listed on the New Zealand Heritage List as a Category 1 Historic Place in 1987.

Proposals to move the statue to the grounds of the University of Otago were raised in the late 2010s, to coincide with the 150th anniversary of the university. Supporters cited the statue's relatively inaccessible location adjacent to two car parks and a brothel. The statue was cleaned and restored in 2020, although ultimately not moved.

== See also ==
- List of historic places in Dunedin
