= Stuart Fraser (civil servant) =

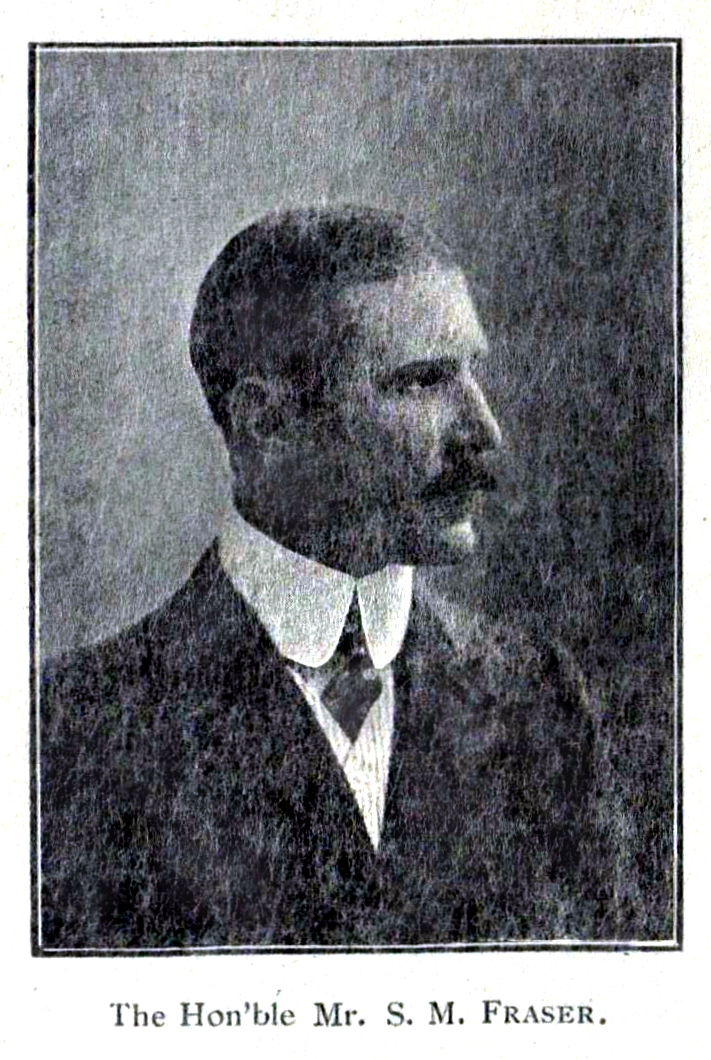

Sir Stuart Milford Fraser, KCSI, CIE (2 June 1864 – 1 December 1963) was a distinguished officer of the Foreign and Political Department of the Government of India. Five years after joining the Indian Civil Service, he was appointed tutor to the Maharajas of Kolhapur and Bhavnagar, and later (1896–1902) was tutor and guardian to the Maharaja of Mysore. The Fraser Town locality in Bangalore was named after him.

== Early life ==
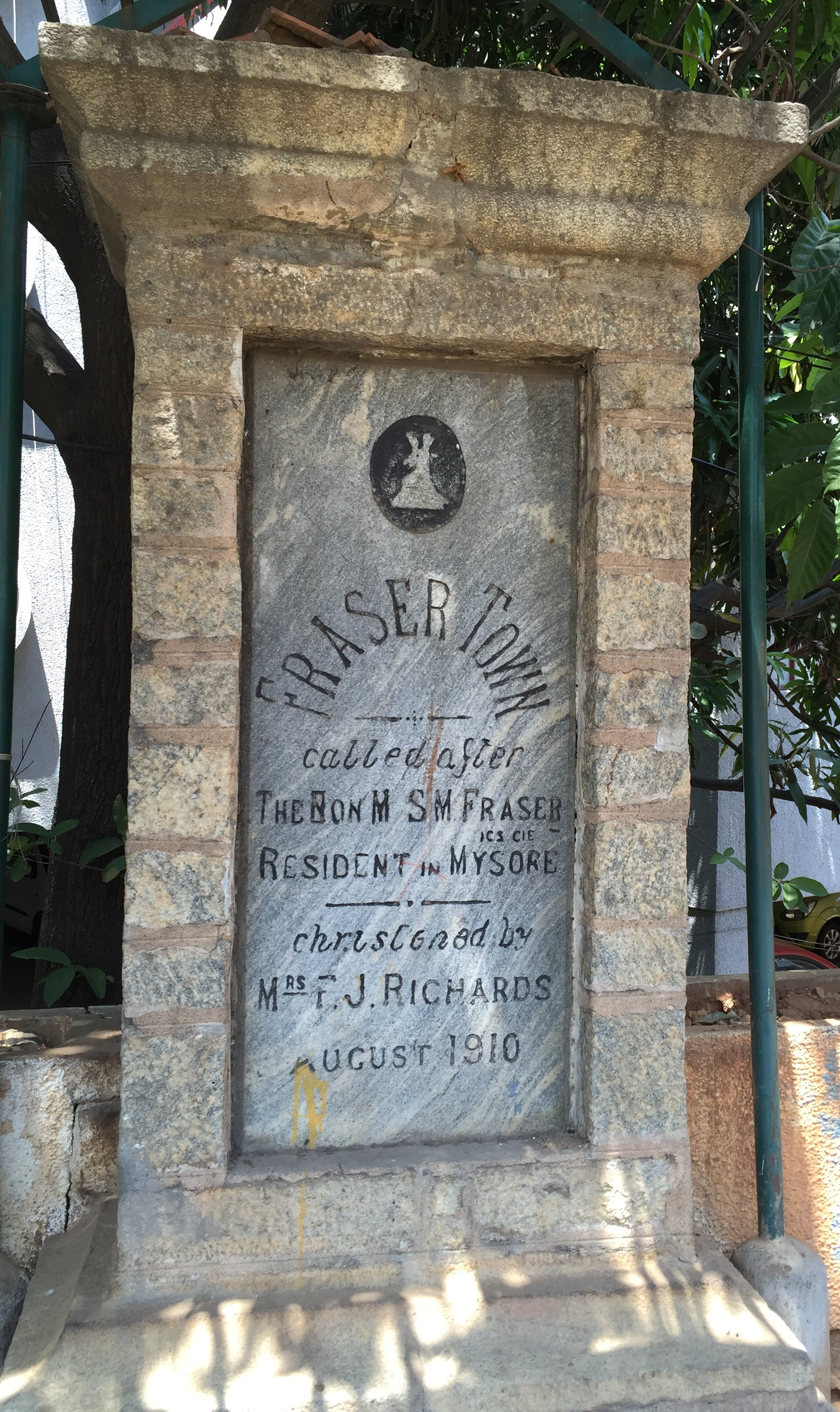
Stone Inscription at Fraser Town, Bangalore, India

Stuart Milford Fraser was educated at Blundell's School and Balliol College. He passed the examination for the Indian Civil Service in 1882 and was allocated to the Bombay Presidency.

== Tutoring of princes ==
Within 5 years Fraser was selected as guardian and tutor to the Raja of Kolhapur, later to become Chhatrapati Shahu Maharaj after being educated at Rajkumar College, Rajkot.

He later had responsibility for the leadership preparations of the Maharajah of Bhavanagar, Shri Bhavsinhji II (1875–1919) after schooling at Rajkumar College, Rajkot like his father, Takhtsinhji and son, Krishna Kumarasingh Bhavasingh the last Maharaja of Bhavnagar.

In 1896 Fraser was appointed as governor and tutor to the young Krishna Raja Wadiyar IV, Maharaja of Mysore, who was later to become known as a beneficent ruler who enhanced the reputation of Mysore as a model state.

== Anglo-Tibetan Convention 1904 ==
In 1903 Fraser went to the Foreign Department at Calcutta and Simla as deputy secretary and in 1904 was sent by Lord Curzon as H.M Commissioner to negotiate with the Chinese about the Anglo-Tibetan Convention (requiring Tibet to open its border with British India).

== Later career ==
Fraser returned to India in 1905 as Resident in Mysore and Chief Commissioner of Coorg. In 1911 Fraser was appointed Resident in Kashmir and for several months in 1914 was acting Resident in Hyderabad.

At the commencement of the First World War, with Turkey taking the side of Germany, it was Fraser’s resolute and confident approach that persuaded Osman Ali Khan, Asaf Jah VII, the Nizam of Hyderabad, to resist defeatist view and ensure continued support for the British Raj.

== Fraser Town, Bangalore, India ==
Fraser Town is a suburb of Bangalore Cantonment, in Bangalore North-East, spread over 4 km2. It was established in 1906 and is named after Stuart Mitford Fraser (1864-1963). Fraser Town was established to de-congest the growing Bangalore Civil and Military Station (otherwise known as the Bangalore Cantonment). The foundation of Fraser Town was laid in August 1910 by Mrs. F J Richards, with a commemorative plaque on the corner of Coles Road and Mosque Road . Fraser Town is a residential and commercial suburb, the prominent roads being Promenade Road, Netaji Road, Madhavraya Mudaliar Road (M M Road), Haines Road, Spencer Road, Wheeler Road, Mosque Road, etc. The suburb is known for its communal harmony with Hindus, Muslims and Christians living side by side in peace.

== Sources ==
- Obituary – Sir Stuart Fraser, The Times, 4 December 1963 (p. 18; Issue 55875; col A).
- Obituary – Sir Stuart Fraser, Journal of the Royal Central Asian Society, LI (1964), p. 197.
- Royal India: a descriptive and historical study of India's fifteen principal states and their rulers, Maud Diver, Ayer Publishing, 1971, ISBN 0-8369-2152-6, ISBN 978-0-8369-2152-6.
