= St. John's High School, Bengaluru =

School in Bangalore

St John's High School is a school in Bangalore, Karnataka, India, founded in 1854.

== History ==
The school was built to serve the interests of the Anglo-Indian Community and the children of military personnel and government pensioners. Rev. R. Posnett, an Anglican clergyman, was sent to look after the spiritual interests of the Europeans and the Anglo Indians in the Cantonment area. In 1853 he constructed a small room on the Mootycherry Ridge, which later came to be known as St. John's Hill. This room served as a chapel-cum-schoolroom. In the morning it was used as a school for children; in the afternoon as a library and a reading room and on Sundays for public worship.

A new school building was opened in 1854; it is linked to St. John's Church, Bangalore.

The school operated as a middle school until 1961. At that stage after completing the middle school examination of the erstwhile Mysore State, children transferred to other schools for their last two years.

In 1962 the institution was upgraded to a high school and joined the select band of schools taking the Anglo–Indian School Certificate. The first candidates were presented for that examination in 1970.

When the CSI came into being in 1947 the school and church came under the jurisdiction of the erstwhile Mysore Diocese and the property was transferred to the CSITA.

Until December 1962, the school was managed by the Pastorate Committee of St. John's Church but, from January 1963, it functioned under a constitution framed by the Pastorate Committee. In 1999, it was transferred to the management of the diocese and the new constitution came into effect from 1 May 2000. From June 2000, ISC (Std XI and Std. XII) was introduced.

The school is managed by a Board of Management. The Chairman of the Board is the Bishop of the Karnataka Central Diocese of the Church of South India. The Members of the Board are drawn from the fields of finance, education, administration, social services etc.

The school's motto is "Nil Desperandum, Semper Fidendum" which is Latin for "Never despair, always have faith".

St John's was a co-educational Middle School (until 9th Std) till 1962 - being a feeder school to Bishop Cottons Boys/ Girls School.
