= St. John's Church, Bengaluru =

St. John's Church
- Saint John's Church
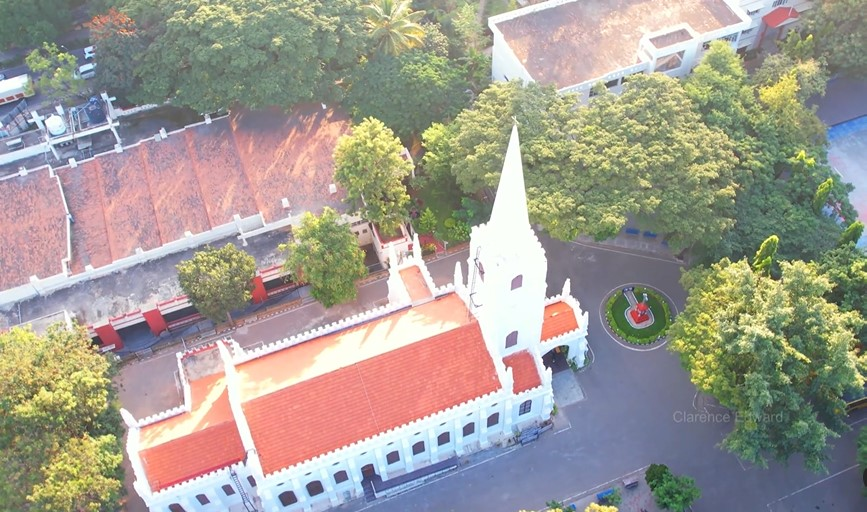
- St. John's Church
- 12°59′30″N 77°36′47″E
- Location: Bangalore
- Country: India
- Denomination: Church of South India
- Tradition: Anglican
- Website: https://stjohnsbangalore.church/

History
- Consecrated: 1857

Architecture
- Style: English Gothic
- Groundbreaking: 1853
- Completed: 1857

Administration
- Diocese: Karnataka Central Diocese

St. John's Church is located in St. John's Hill, Cleveland Town, Bangalore Cantonment, India, in between Promenade Road and St. John's Church Road. The church is the fourth oldest Protestant church in the city, with a distinct red edifice and towering steeple, rising out of the leafy surroundings. The church is dedicated to St. John the Evangelist.

== History ==
=== Chapel, school and library on Haines Road ===
St. John's Church traces its origin to a small chapel and school, located in Haines Road which connects Cleveland Town to Fraser Town. The small school has now grown into the St. John's High School in the church compound.

Rev. R Posnett, Assistant Chaplain, East India Company, serving at St. Mark's Church played a significant role in establishing St. John's Church and the school. In those days, that end (Cleveland Town and Fraser Town) of the Bangalore Cantonment housed mainly pensioned officers and employees of the East Indian Company, Europeans and their native wives and Eurasian children. These Eurasian children were not allowed to enroll in the European styled schools of the Cantonment. Rev. Posnett saw the need to provide for a church and school for these residents of the Bangalore Cantonment. A single room measuring 750 ft2 was built, on Haines Road, serving as school during the day, library for the pensioners during the afternoon, and as a church on Sundays. Reference to the existence of this chapel/school can be found in the records of St. Mark's Church in February 1853. The chapel/school/library was built out of funds raised by officers of the East India Company. The reading room for pensioners at Haines Road is also mentioned by William Sproston Caine in his book 'Picturesque India: a Handbook for European Travellers', published in 1890 (p. 522).

In a letter dated 23 April 1853, Rev. Posnett, writing to the Bishop of Madras, reported church services were held on Wednesday evenings and on Sundays, with the room filled to excess with 100-115 people in attendance. Further, the school was attended by 52 girls and 16 boys. Hence, there was a need to sell the present premises and move to a large ones. Rev. Posnett approached the Government of Madras, Church Building Society, and Major General Sewell, the then Commanding General Officer, for funds for construction of a school and chapel. However, it was uncommon for the Government of Madras to fund church buildings for civilian purposes (only churches for military congregations were funded), and hence the proposal was rejected.

In 1950, writing in the St. John's Centenary Journal, Rev. W. Holder says "The exact site of this Chapel-School room is obscure, though a building, reputed to be such stands on Haines Road..". The exact location of this chapel/school is unknown at present, as are any other details such as the year of construction year or the associated cost. It is nevertheless possible that records could be found in the 'Madras Government Archives', 'Madras Diocese Office', 'Indian Church Trust, Calcutta' or the 'Bangalore Garrisons Office'.

=== Mootocherry Anglican Church ===
Rev. Posnett, managed to raise the required funds by appealing to the different congregations in India and abroad. The total collections amounted to INR 2,669 and 11 Annas, with £10 contributed by Rev. C. G. Townsend from Hatfield, England. An empty plot of land, lying beside the Roman Catholic chapel (future St. Francis Xavier's Cathedral) was purchased by Rev. Posnett for INR 100 in October 1853. The enclosure was built around the purchased land, earmarking it for the future Mootocherry Anglican Church, along with a school and library.

The church, school and the library had matching Gothic architecture. Rev. Posnett had the church designed by the engineers who designed the Municipal Offices (Attara Katcheri, now Karnataka High Court building). The school and the library were completed on 16 May 1854, at a cost of INR 2,700. The schools, one each for boys and girls, were inaugurated on 28 May 1854 by Rev. Posnett, who had now become the chaplain of St. Mark's Church.

=== St. John's Church ===
Rev. Posnett, left St. Mark's Church in September 1854, and was succeeded by Rev. B. S. Clarke and Rev. D. J. Rogers, who continued to work towards building St. John's Church. They were able to get funding from the Church Building Society and the Government of Madras to expand the church, so as to accommodate 300 people. The expansion along with furniture and construction of the compound wall cost INR 11,625, with the works being supervised by the Madras Sappers and Miners regiment. St. John's Church was consecrated on 12 April 1858 by Rt. Rev. Thomas Dealtry the third Bishop of Madras, officially as St. John's Church, after St. John the Evangelist. Rev. Dealtry (son of Bishop Dealtry) became the first chaplain of the church.

In 1914, the St. John's School had 135 girls and boys in attendance. As for the other schools in the cantonment, St. Aloysius School had 280 students, the Wesleyan Mission Secondary School had 235, and St. Andrews School had many students.

== Named after St. John ==
After St. John's Church was established, the surround Mootocherry was renamed as St. John's Hill, and the road from the church to Ulsoor Lake was named as St. John's Church Road. The road connecting Meanee Avenue to Dickenson Road was named as St. John's Road, and the road leading Ulsoor Lake to the Kalpali Cemetery was named as St. John's Cemetery Road.

== Extensions ==
The church tower was raised at the end of 1858, as the result of a contribution of INR 1,000 by Rev. Clarke, Rev. Rogers and Rev. Dealtry. In 1895-96, the edifice was extended to include the choir, a large portico and two front vestries.

== Pipe organ ==
The pipe organ (by Norman and Beard) at St. John's is among the oldest and rarest, and very difficult to repair. Initially, air had to be pumped manually. An electric blower was added to the organ by Albert David in 1969. The organ is nowadays used only for special occasions.

In 2013, a specialist team from Johannus, installed an Ecclesia T-270 at St. John's Church. The Ecclesia T-270 church organ has 40 voices, 2 manuals and an 8.1 audio system.

== WWI memorial ==
There exists a memorial in front of the church for members of the church who lost their lives in service of 'King and Empire', in World War I. On Remembrance Day (11 November), the officers of the Madras Regiment offer their tributes at this memorial.

== Vintage gallery ==
A series of photos from the Fred Goodwill collection, taken from the spire of St. John's Church around 1911 can be seen at these links below:

- Photo 1: From the spire of St. John's Church, Bangalore. Early 1900s (Looking left towards Shivajinagar) - Fred Goodwill Collection. The church spires of St Mary's and St. Andrew's can be seen at a distance.
- Photo 2: From the spire of St. John's Church, Bangalore. Early 1900s (Looking left towards Shivajinagar) - Fred Goodwill Collection
- Photo 3: From the spire of St. John's Church, Bangalore. Early 1900s (Looking front - The old St. John's School and Reading Room). The old St. Francis Xavier's Church can also be seen. - Fred Goodwill Collection
- Photo 4: From the spire of St. John's Church, Bangalore. Early 1900s (Looking right - St. Joseph's Convent and Fraser Town) - Fred Goodwill Collection

Another picture by CH Doveton,

- St. John's Church, Bangalore (1900), by C H Doveton
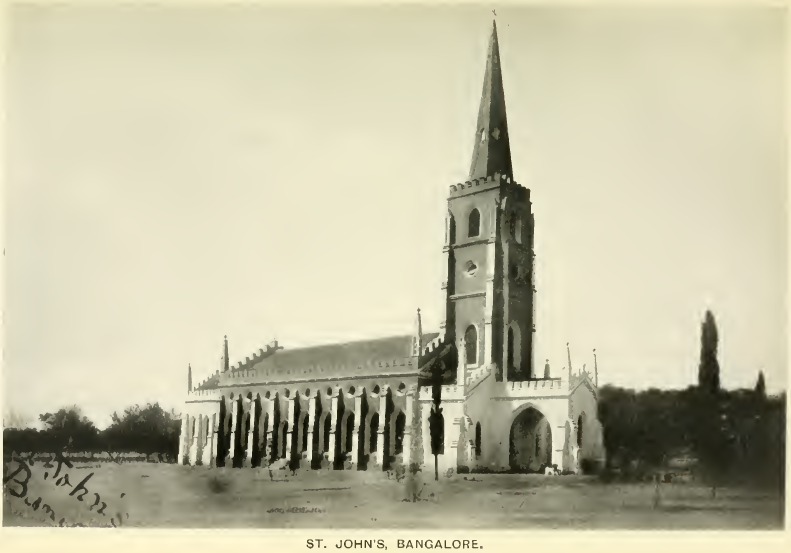
St. John's Church, Bangalore (1922), from Rev. Frank Penny's Book 'The Church in Madras, Volume III'

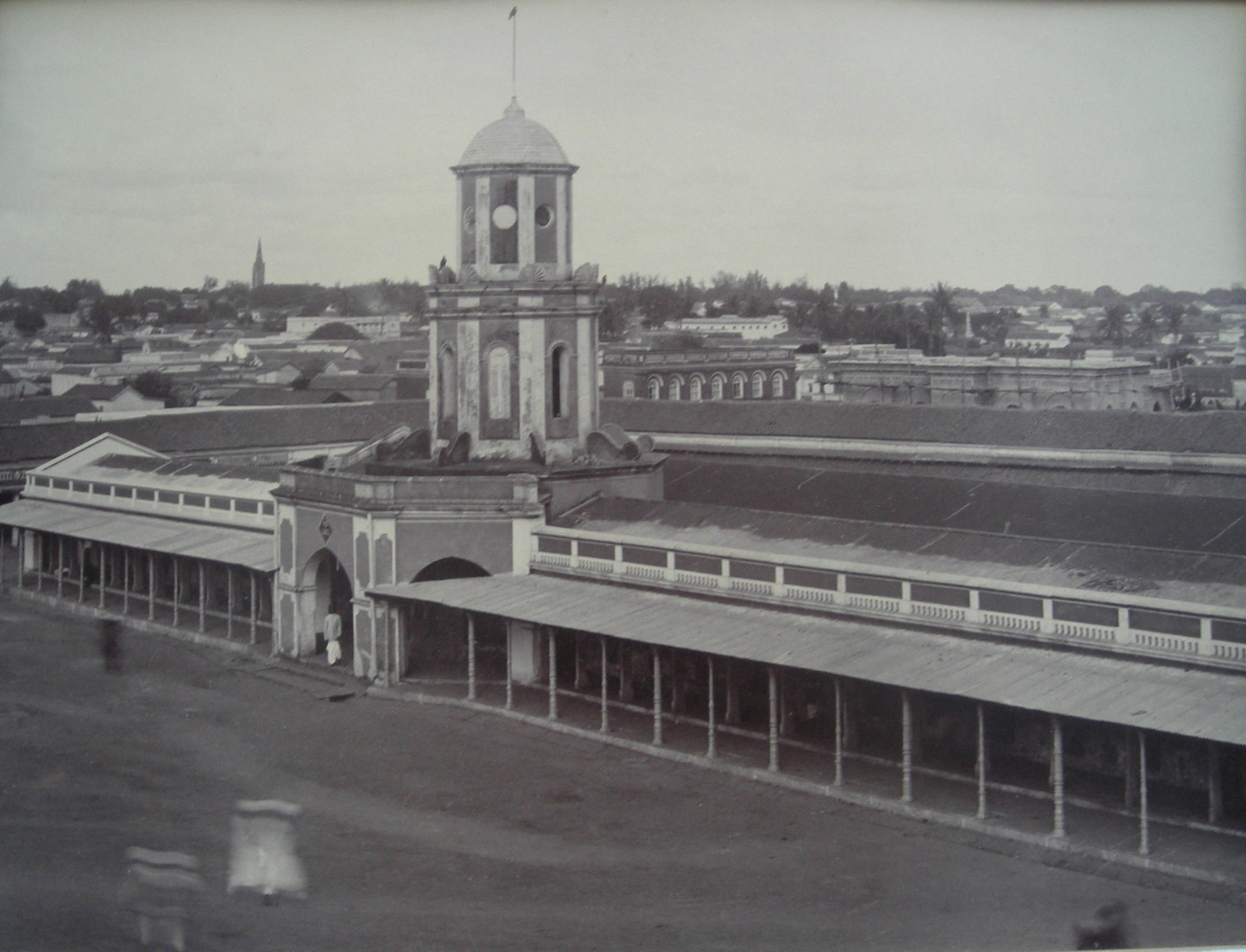
The Market in Bangalore - c1880's (predecessor to the Russell Market), the spire of St. John's can be seen on the top left

== St. John's Cemetery ==
The earliest burial at the St. John's Cemetery was in 1820. However, no record exists of the exact year when the cemetery was established. Before Indian Independence, only Europeans were allowed to be buried at the cemetery. In 1884, a War Memorial was raised in the cemetery by the Non-Commissioned Officers of the 42nd Company of the Royal Engineers, in memory of their fallen comrades in peace time and war. This monument is now maintained by the Madras Regiment. In 1858, a chapel was constructed in the cemetery, which was in use till the 1960s and after that was used to house the cemetery watchman, and unfortunately fell into disrepair.

== Community services ==
Right from the late 1800s the church has been supporting the Poor Fund and the Leprosy Mission. In 1918, St. John's Institute was established for the benefit of the soldiers of the barracks nearby. In 1959, a hostel for Tibetan refugees was established. On 12 August 1978, the church established Asha Nivas, an elderly home in the church compound. The church also manages the Stephen's Old Age Home, in Clarke Street, Richmond Town. In 1999, an open-air chapel was established at St. John's Church cemetery, Kalpally. In June 2002, the St. John's Community Centre was established.

Rev. Vinay Samuel, pastor of St. John's Church between 1975–83, and his wife Colleen Samuel, developed ministry for slum dwellers in Lingarajpuram, and helped establish a daughter congregation, Divya Shanti, at Lingarajpuram in 1983.

== Local name and former resident ==
The local Tamil population of the cantonment call the church 'Sigapoo Oosimatha Koil', which translates to 'red church' in Tamil. Well known cartoonist Paul Fernandes remembers his childhood in Fraser Town, where the skyline was dominated by St. Francis Xavier's Cathedral and St. John's Church.
