= Jessie Torrance =

New Zealand nurse and deaconess (1874–1949)

Jessie Torrance (15 February 1874 – 12 December 1949) was a New Zealand nurse and deaconess.

== Early life ==
Torrance was born in Dunedin, the second daughter of Scottish immigrants Eliza Wright and John Ainslie Torrance. Torrance's upbringing was heavily influenced by religion - her father was the chaplain at Dunedin's hospital, jail and asylum, a lay preacher and elder in the Presbyterian Church, and later worked for the Patients' and Prisoners' Aid Society. Torrance trained as a nurse at Dunedin Hospital, passing her state registration examinations at the end of 1908.

== Career ==
On graduating, Torrance went into private nursing, and after the Plunket Society was established in 1907, she became one of the earliest Plunket nurses. She resigned from her position, however, over a disagreement with Plunket's founder Frederic Truby King. St John Ambulance invited her to join their organisation, and she worked for them for 13 years, including during World War I.

Shortly after the devastating 1918 influenza pandemic, Knox Church in Dunedin hired Torrance as a parish nurse; a bequest in 1915 by a local benefactor provided funds for such an appointment. Torrance held a daily clinic in rooms at the Knox Sunday School in Great King Street, made visits to patients in their homes, dispensed medications and lent nursing equipment as needed. She saw anyone in need in the community, and provided social work services as well as nursing. In addition, she tutored students of the church's Missionary Training Unit and nurses who wanted to become deaconesses.

In the 1920s, Torrance was made an honorary deaconess of Knox Church. She retired from nursing in 1943, having served Knox Church for 25 years. She died in Dunedin on 12 December 1949.
