= Donald Stuart (minister) =

Presbyterian minister, educationalist (1819–1894)

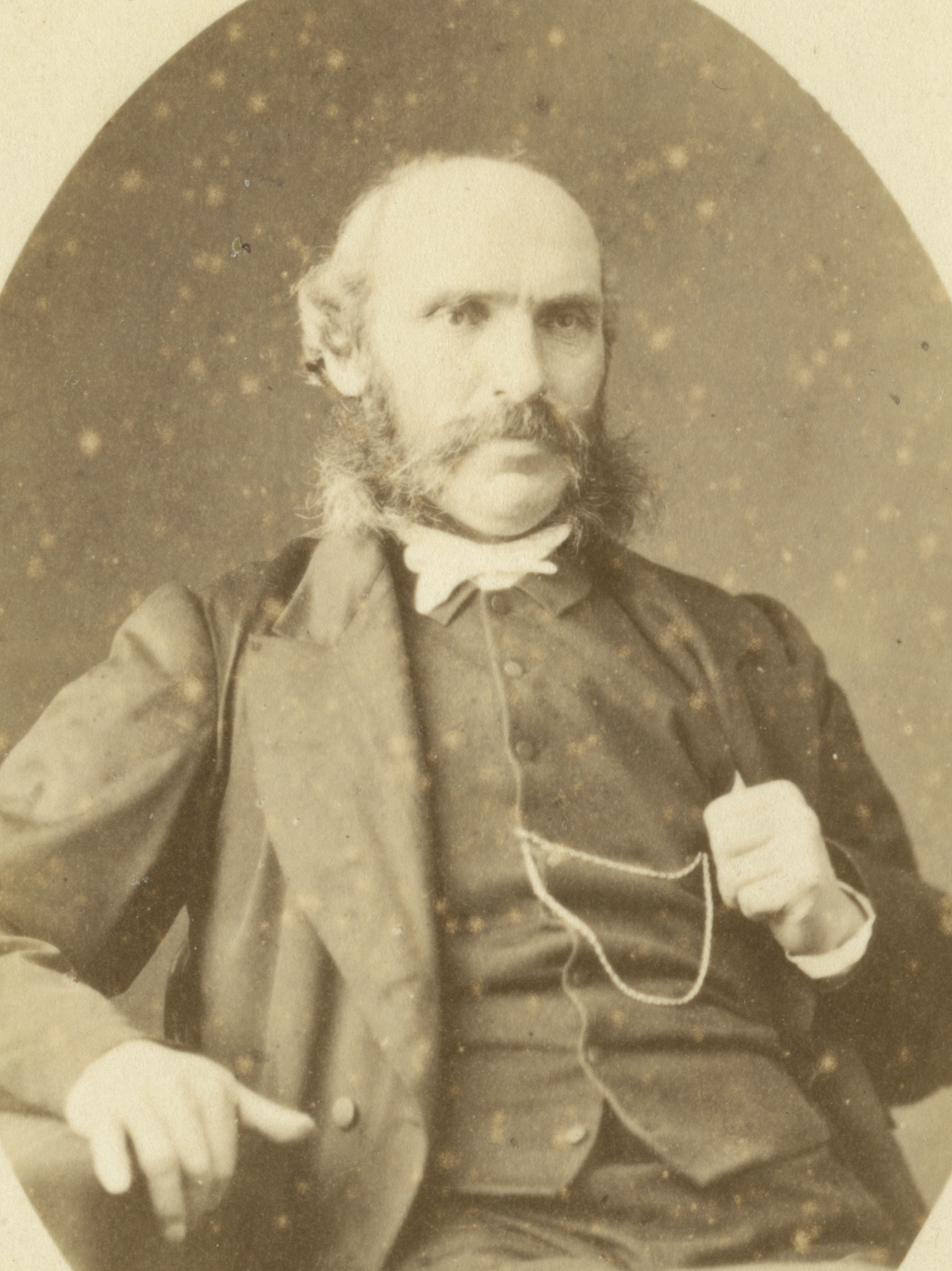
Donald Stuart, c. 1869

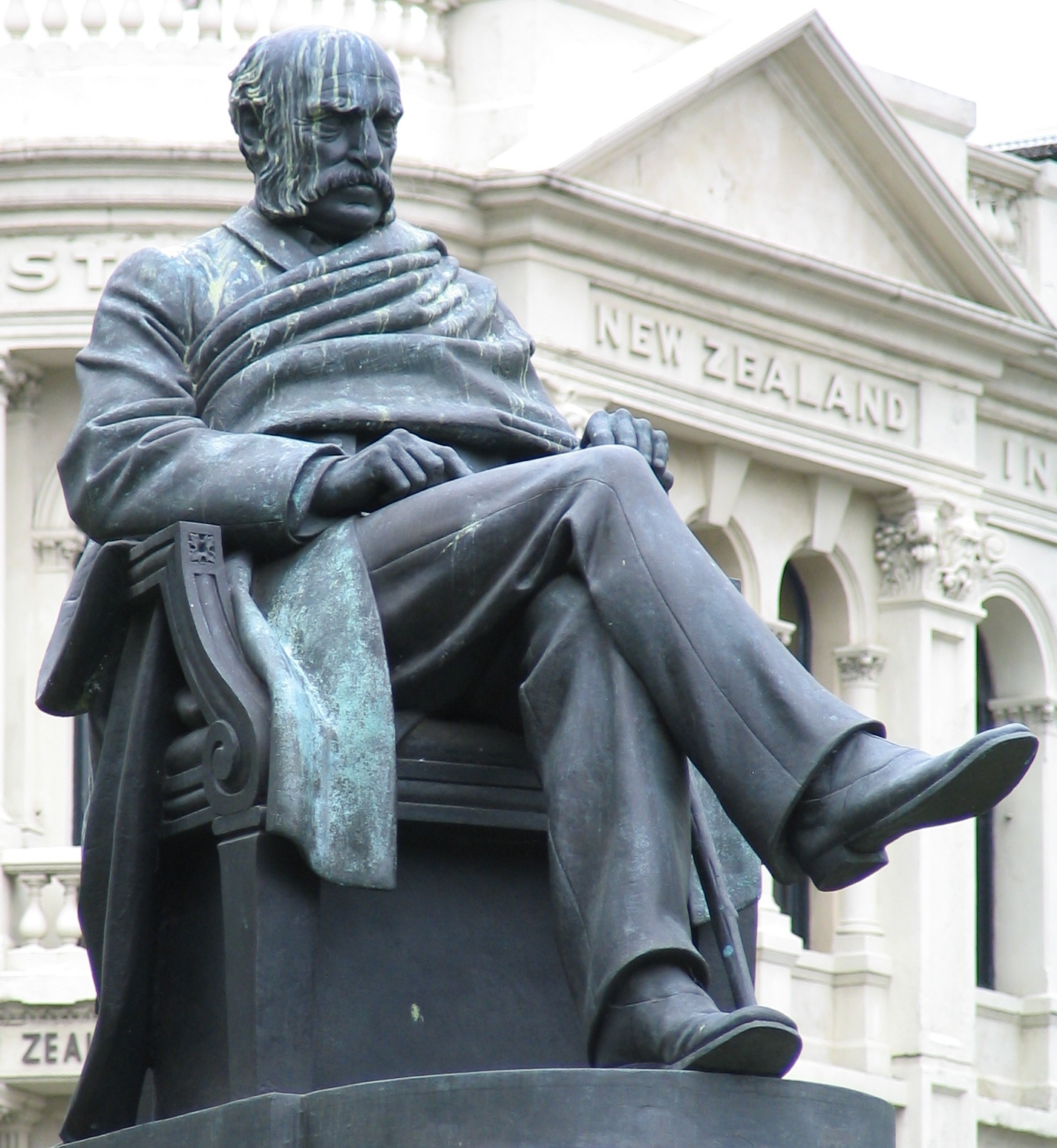
Stuart Memorial in Dunedin

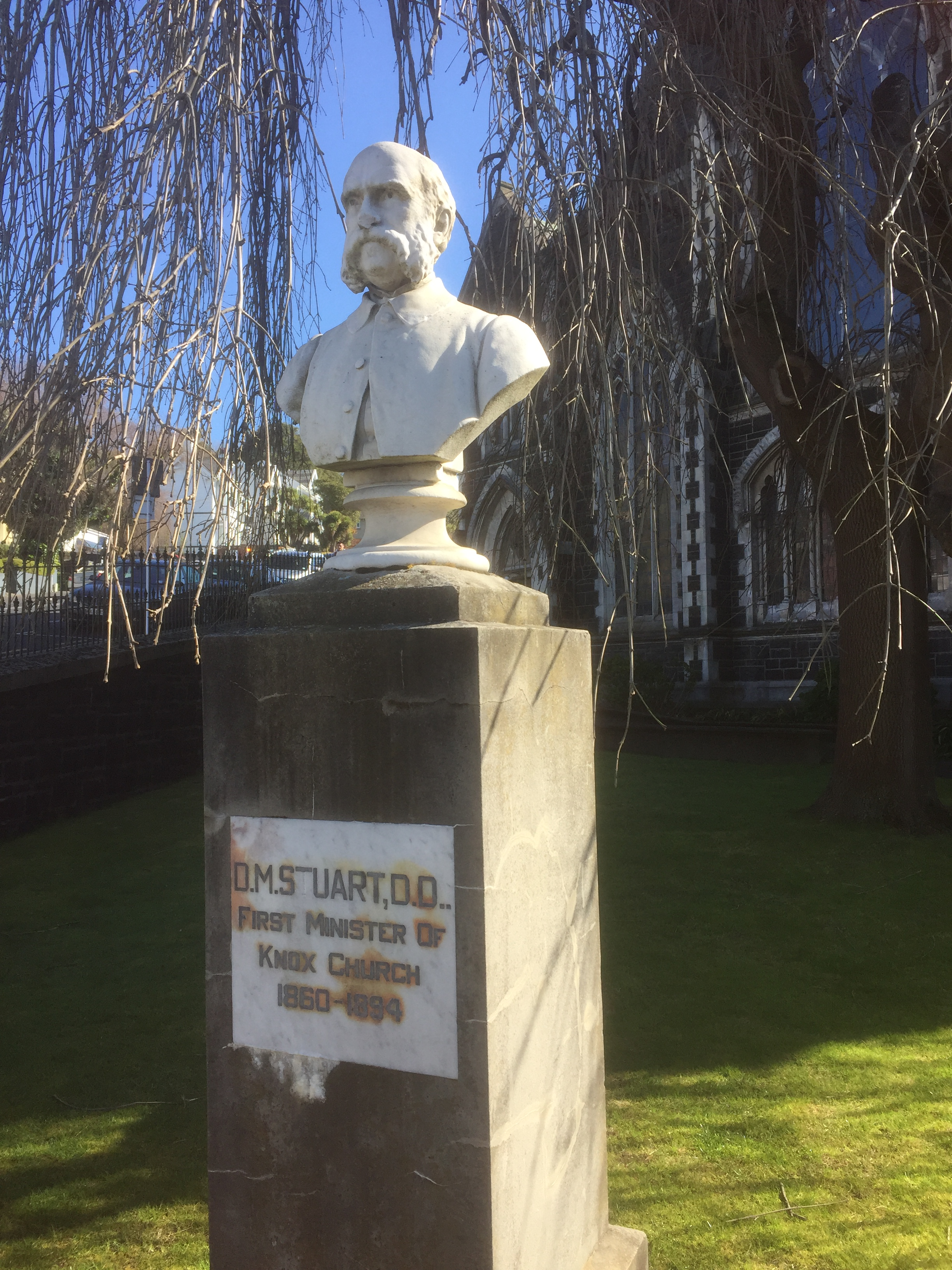
D.M. Stuart bust outside Knox Church

Donald McNaughton Stuart (1819 – 12 May 1894) was a New Zealand Presbyterian minister and educationalist.

Stuart was the son of Alexander Stuart and Janet (McNaughton) his wife, was born in the hamlet of Styx Kenmore, or Stichs, Perthshire, Scotland. In 1837 he started a school at Leven, Perthshire, and two years later entered at the University of St Andrews. Having supported Dr. Thomas Chalmers for the Lord Rectorship after the disruption, he was expelled, with the majority of the students, for refusing to submit to an admonition from the senators. A Royal Commission shortly afterwards reinstated the extruded students, but Dr. Stuart removed from St. Andrews to New College, Edinburgh, where he was a theological student under Dr. Chalmers.

In 1844, Stuart was appointed classical master, and subsequently principal, of a private secondary school at Upton Park, Eton, and in July 1848, was married at Slough, Windsor, to Miss Jessie Robertson. He commenced studying for the ministry in London and completed his curriculum in Edinburgh, being licensed by the Free Presbytery of Kelso to the Presbyterian church of Falstone, North Northumberland, where he remained for ten years. In January 1860 Dr. Stuart arrived in Dunedin to take up the position of first minister of Knox Church. Stuart was highly regarded in Dunedin. Humane, liberal, and approachable, he was well known for his support for the poor, often visiting the needy to provide blankets and food for them from his own purse.

Stuart was heavily involved in education, becoming chairman of the Otago Boys' and Otago Girls' High Schools, having been active in the campaigns to set up these two institutions, and was Vice-Chancellor and then Chancellor of the University of Otago, holding the latter post until his death in 1879.

Stuart died at Dunedin on 12 May 1894, and was buried in Dunedin Southern Cemetery. An estimated 6,000 people walked in his funeral procession. He is uniquely commemorated by having two public statues in his honour in Dunedin; a seated figure adjacent to Queens Gardens and a bust outside Knox Church.
