= Knox Church, Dunedin =

19th-century Presbyterian church in Dunedin, New Zealand

Coordinates: 45.867152°S 170.507083°E

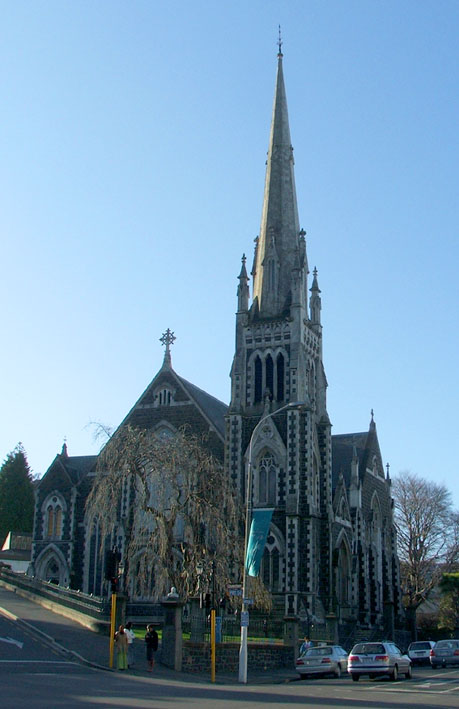
Knox Church, Dunedin, viewed from the south

Knox Church is a notable building in Dunedin, New Zealand. It houses the city's second Presbyterian congregation and is the city's largest church (in terms of building size, rather than congregation size) of any denomination.

Situated close to the university at the northern end of the CBD on George Street it is visible from much of the central city.

== History ==
=== The first church ===
In 1858 a committee was established under the chairmanship of John Gillies, Otago's resident magistrate to establish a new church and appoint a minister to service the spiritual needs of the Presbyterian residents of Dunedin. The congregation for the new church was formed from the union in 1860 of worshippers from First Church (who contributed a third of its membership) and from the independent congregation (with the exception of Baptist and Wesleyan worshippers who formed their own churches). When the church opened on 6 May 1861 it was the second Presbyterian church in the settlement. on the corner of Great King and Frederick Streets close to the University of Otago Faculty of Dentistry building. The land had been donated by John Hyde Harris, who suggested that it be named Knox church. Build of wood, its first minister was the Reverend D. M. Stuart, who arrived from England in January 1861 to take up his appointment.

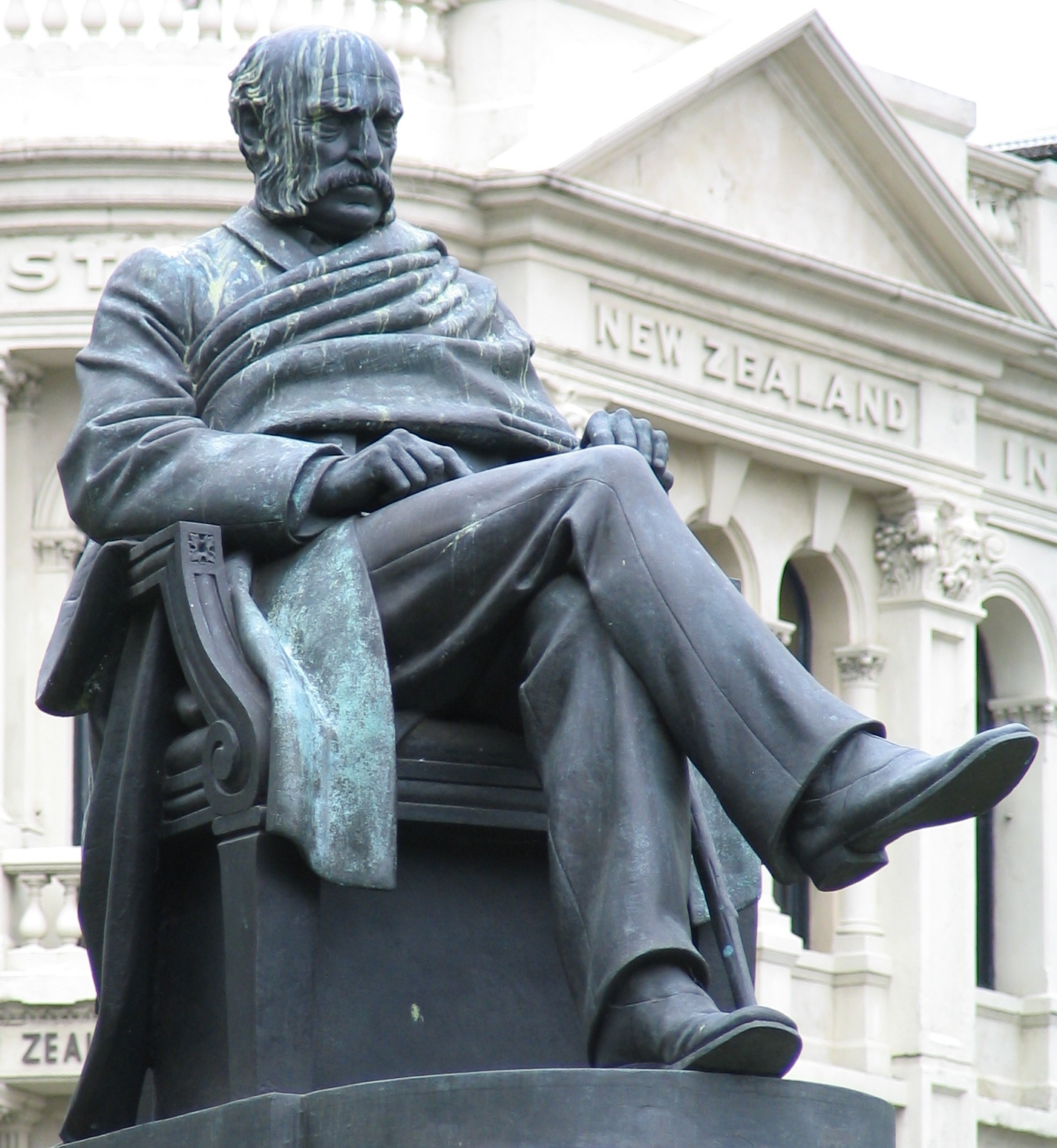
Statue of The Reverend Dr. Donald M. Stuart, first minister of Knox Church, from 1860 to 1894

=== Design of a new church ===
Though this was only ever intended to be a short-term home for the Knox congregation the onset of the Otago gold rush which had resulted in a rapid increase in the settlements population intensified the need for a larger, permanent structure. Therefore it was decided in 1871 to construct a new church which was to be capable of seating 1,000, with space for a choir of 30 and to feature a belfry and a gallery. A site was purchased for £569 (consisting of £369 for the land and £200 for the cottage and stable on the land) on the corner of George and Pitt Streets from the trustees of the estate of Edmund Bowler. His family was later to unsuccessfully sue the trustees for selling the land too cheaply.

Church officials held a competition for which 17 designs were submitted. It was won by Robert Lawson. His plans, would have exceeded the church's £5,000 budget. Despite increasing the budget to £6,000 this was still in inadequate to complete Lawson's design so the deacons fell back on a design by David Ross (who designed the Otago Museum). Ross was issued with the commission on 22 August 1879, with £7200 allocated to build the church and to provide seating and lighting. However, David Ross disagreed with the building committee about which stone to use, and insisted on employing an inspector of works who "could be bought at any time with a pot of beer", These arguments caused many issues, and Ross was given notice after his contract ended on 16 January 1873. Although the Church deacons offered generous compensation, Ross successfully sued—only to be awarded a mere £2 in damages.

The church authorities approached Lawson again and he took over the project in 1874.

=== Construction ===
Construction began in 1872. The foundation stone was laid on 25 November 1872, which was exactly 300 years since the death of John Knox.

The church was opened on 5 November 1876 with the Reverend Dr Samuel conducting the morning service, the Reverend A. B. Todd the afternoon and the Reverend William Will the evening. The building eventually cost £18,383 and the debt was not cleared until 1891.

Because of maintenance requirements and the need to install a new fire sprinkler system the church was closed for the first time in June 2008. The congregation joined that of First Church for the duration of the three-month project. The building was reopened after renovations were completed in September 2008. While the primary reason for closing the church was to install the sprinkler system there was also a need to restore some of the windows. Faces, feet and other details had faded over time and work was necessary to make these visible again.

== Description ==
It was designed by Lawson in the 13th century Gothic style. Constructed of bluestone from quarries close to the Water of Leith, and with Oamaru stone dressings and spire, its plan forms a Latin cross, with a nave 30 metres in length and 22 metres in average width. The spire rises to a height of 51 metres. It has a slate roof.

Unusually for a New Zealand church, it contains two pipe organs, a large Hill, Norman, & Beard one installed in 1931 and extensively refurbished in 1974, and a smaller oak-case instrument originally installed in a church in Christchurch.

The church seats 900.

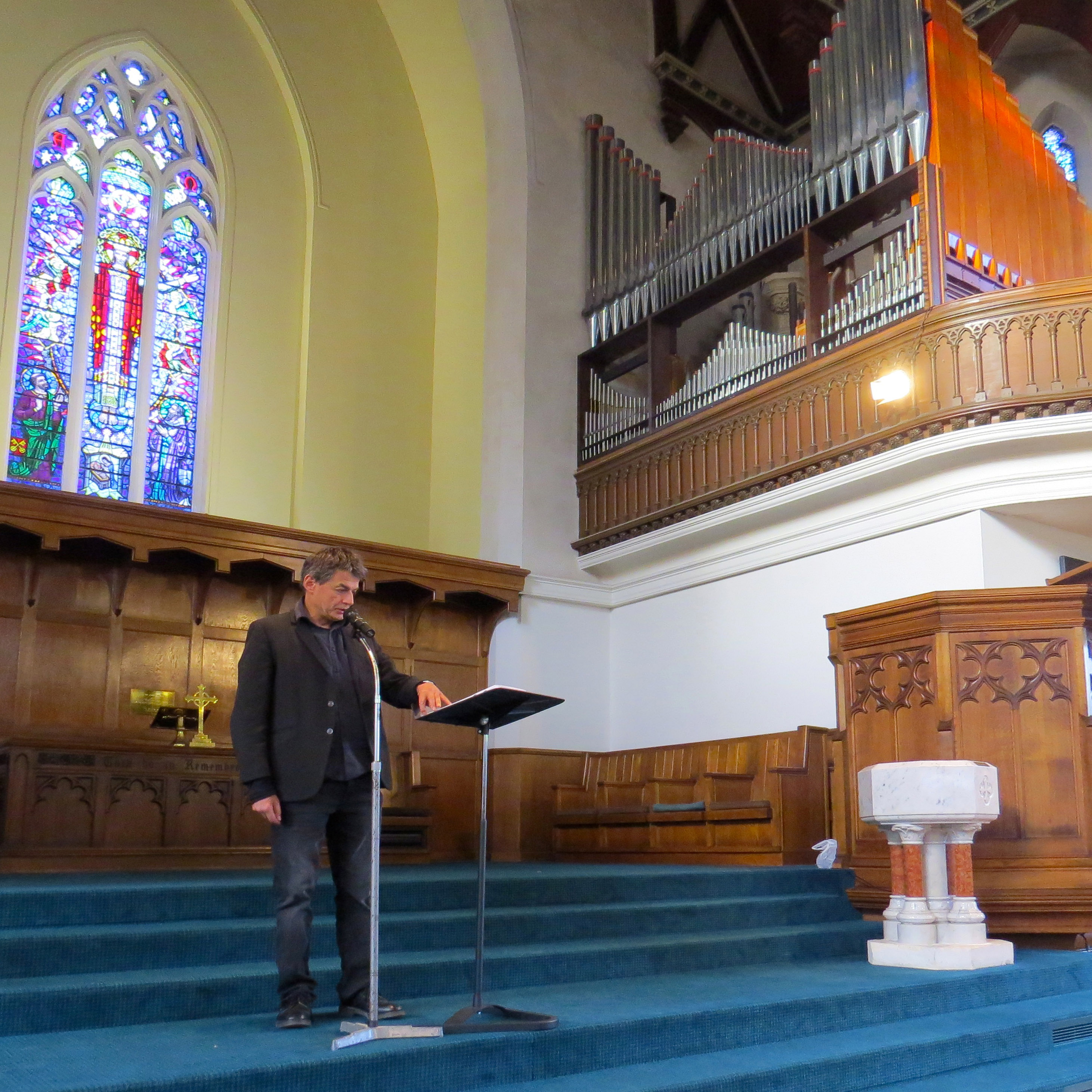
New Zealand poet David Eggleton in recital at Knox Church, March 2016

== Notable people ==
Notable ministers include Rev. James Gunn Matheson. Other people associated with the church include Jessie Torrance, nurse and honorary deaconess in the 1920s, and Vera Hayward.
