= Edith Statham =

New Zealand singer, nurse, secretary, war graves conservator, community worker

- Born: Edith Mary Staham; 13 April 1853; Bootle, Lancashire, England
- Died: 13 February 1951 (aged 97); Saint Heliers, Auckland, New Zealand
- Occupation: War graves inspector
- Parent(s): William Statham; Ellen Allen Hadfield

Edith Mary Statham (13 April 1853 – 13 February 1951) was a notable New Zealand singer, nurse, secretary, war graves conservator and community worker.

== Early life ==
Statham was born in Bootle, Lancashire, England, on 13 April 1853. She was a daughter of a solicitor, William Statham, and his wife, Ellen Allen Statham. When she was 10 years old, she moved to New Zealand with her family.

== Education ==
It is unknown how and where Statham got her education. She was trained as a singer and nurse at Dunedin Hospital.

== Activities ==
Statham was a founding member of the "Society for the Protection of Women and Children" in Dunedin. She was a secretary of the "Mimiro Ladies' Cycling Club", which she established around 1895, when she moved to Dunedin. Statham directed a school for many years to teach women how to cycle. She was awarded the King George V Silver Jubilee Medal in 1935.
