= Isabella Fraser =

New Zealand hospital matron

Isabella Fraser (15 November 1857 – 24 November 1932) was a New Zealand matron of Dunedin Hospital.

Fraser was born in Largs, Ayrshire, Scotland on 15 November 1857. She trained in nursing at the Edinburgh Infirmary from 1887. After training she worked at the Western Infirmary in Glasgow before leaving Scotland for Tasmania in 1890. In 1891 she became night superintendent of nurses at Melbourne Hospital. She became matron of Dunedin Hospital in 1893 holding that position until 1910. She retired to Napier in 1910 where she died on 24 November 1932.

Fraser's involvement with training nurses began in Melbourne and continued in Dunedin at the University of Otago Medical School. She established a three year training course in 1894 and was "highly regarded for her administrative and teaching skills". On his retirement in 1927 Dr A.R. Falconer, the medical superintendent of Dunedin Hospital, paid tribute to Fraser's dedication, efficiency and promotion of high standards of nursing. Fraser belonged to the Royal British Nurses Association from 1895.

Dunedin Hospital instituted the Fraser Medal in 1911 to be awarded to nursing students for competency in practical nursing. The first medals were awarded in 1912.
