= Edward Hulme =

New Zealand doctor and health administrator

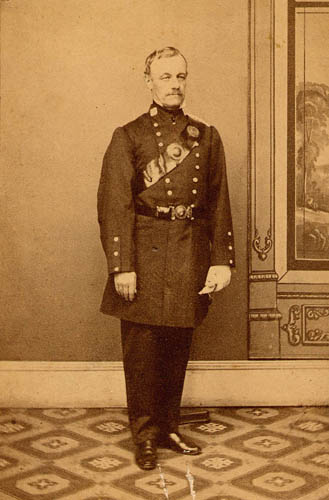
Photograph of Edward Hulme, date unknown

Edward Hulme (18 May 1812 – 27 December 1876) was a New Zealand surgeon and the administrator of Dunedin Hospital, one of New Zealand's oldest and largest hospitals, during a period of rapid growth.

== Early life and education ==
Born in Hythe, Kent, in England on 18 May 1812, Hulme was the son of a captain in the Royal Staff Corps. At age 16, Hulme became an apprentice to Sir Charles Bell at Middlesex Hospital. By 1839, he had received his degree in medicine from the University of St. Andrews and was a member of the Royal College of Surgeons of England. Hulme established a practice in Exeter. He later traveled to Paris to study mental health at the Pitié-Salpêtrière Hospital and to Dublin to study midwifery at the Rotunda Hospital.

== Immigration to New Zealand ==
Hulme emigrated to New Zealand in 1856 with expectation of leaving medicine and becoming part of the landed gentry. However, the next year he accepted the position of provincial surgeon and then later health officer for Otago. Hulme assumed responsibility for the Dunedin Hospital and mental health facility as its first medical superintendent.

With the onset of the Otago gold rush in 1861, thousands of miners flooded into the region, overwhelming the local health care system. Hulme fought many battles with provincial officials to upgrade the general hospital and to build a separate mental hospital. Hulme was described as being short tempered, abrupt and having a poor relationship with patients.

Hulme was elected in 1866 as a fellow in the Royal College of Surgeons. He died suddenly on 27 December 1876 in Dunedin, New Zealand.

== Legacy ==
Hulme's Court, Hulme's house and surgery, in Tennyson St, Dunedin was completed in the early 1860s. It is a registered as a Category I Heritage New Zealand historic place.
