= Norman and Beard =

Pipe organ builder

Norman and Beard were a pipe organ manufacturer based in Norwich from 1887 to 1916.

== History ==
The origins of the company are from a business founded in Diss in 1870 by Ernest William Norman (1851–1927). In 1876 he moved to Norwich where he went into partnership with his brother, Herbert John Norman (1861–1936). In 1887 they went into partnership with George A. Wales Beard, and the company was formed. In 1896 the company opened a second office in London.

They worked closely with Robert Hope-Jones and held the patents on many of his developments, including electro-pneumatic action.

The company merged with William Hill & Sons of London in 1916, and became William Hill & Son & Norman & Beard Ltd.

== Organs ==
- St. John's Church, Bangalore 1895
- Norwich Cathedral 1899 (NPOR N06483)
- Llandaff Cathedral 1900 (NPOR N11801)
- Duke's Hall, Royal Academy of Music 1900 (NPOR D07229)
- St Mary's Church, Oldswinford 1901 (NPOR N03681)
- Our Lady Star of the Sea Church, Lowestoft 1902 (wind blown, three manual organ of 1,152 pipes, still in a pristine extant condition)
- St Mary’s Church, Rougham, Suffolk 1900 (NPOR H00690)
- Boğaziçi University, Albert Long Hall, Istanbul 1903 (NPOR H00690)
- Beckenham Baptist Church, Beckenham 1903 (NPOR N01278)
- Nairn Old Parish Church, Nairn 1903 (NPOR R00423)
- All Souls Church, Harlesden
- Leeds Cathedral 1904
- Cheltenham College 1905 (NPOR N07470)
- St Stephen's, Gloucester Road 1905
- St. Michael's Church, Tilehurst, Berkshire 1905
- Town Hall, Wellington New Zealand 1906
- St. Mary the Virgin, Nonington, Kent 1906 (NPOR D04898)
- Parish Church of Kilmun, Argyll & Bute, 1906 (water-powered)
- Town Hall, Auckland, New Zealand 1907-1912
- Bethlehem Welsh Independent Chapel, Rhosllanerchrugog, 1908
- All Saints' Church, Yelvertoft, Northamptonshire. 1908
- Great Hall, University of Birmingham 1908 (NPOR N07270)
- Winchester College Chapel 1908 (NPOR D01086)
- Hope Chapel, Merthyr Tydfil 1909 Organ No.996 (NPOR K01201)
- Emmanuel College, Cambridge 1909 (NPOR N05206)
- All Saints' Church, Binfield, Berkshire. 1910 (NPOR D01111)
- St Mary the Virgin, South Elmsall, West Yorkshire. 1910 (NPOR K01511)
- St. Chads, Shrewsbury, Shropshire 1904
- St. Michael's Church, Aylsham, Norfolk, 1911
- St. Michael & All Angels Church, Wilmington, Kent 1912 (NPOR N08477)
- The Andaz, Temple 1912 (London)
- St.Stephen's Church, Cheltenham. 1912
- St Mary's Parish Church, Slough, Berkshire 1912
- St Mary's Church, Baldock 1913
- St Mary's Church, Reigate, Surrey, UK. 1911
- Walhampton School Chapel, Lymington, Hampshire, 1913
- Usher Hall, Edinburgh 1914 (NPOR D07910)
- St John the Evangelist, Bierley, Bradford 1916 (NPOR N02678)
- Town Hall, Johannesburg 1916
- Sherborne School Chapel, Sherborne, Dorset. 1926
- St John's Cathedral Brisbane Australia
- Trinity Methodist Church, Felixstowe, Suffolk, UK. 1906.
- Calvert Methodist Church, Hastings, Sussex, UK
- Ocker Hill Methodist Church, West Midlands, UK, 1912
- City Hall, Cape Town, South Africa
- United Church, Rondebosch, Cape Town, South Africa
- Chapel of St Peter, Melbourne Grammar School, Melbourne, Australia. 1913
- Bethesda Chapel, Llanwrtyd Wells, Wales .1906
- Troqueer Parish Church, Dumfries
- St. Christopher' Anglican Church, West Vancouver, B.C. Canada. 1963
- St. Mary's Scottish Episcopal Church, Glencoe, Highland. 1916
- NG Church Wakkerstroom, Mpumalanga South Africa 1912
- St Michael's Church, Beaulieu sur mer, France 1903
- Lycée Saint-Vincent Providence de Rennes (Fr) Chapel, Rennes, 1896
- St Andrews Church, Trowse, Norwich, UK. 1913
- St Mary's Church, Bedingfield, Suffolk. 1887 (NPOR D02873)
