= Ismail Sait =

Fukhr-ut-Tojjar Sir Hajee Ismail Sait
- Born: 7 March 1859
- Died: 6 December 1934 (aged 75)
- Occupations: Banker, businessman and Muslim community leader

Khan Bahadur Fukhr-ut-Tojjar Sir Hajee Ismail Sait (7 March 1859 – 6 December 1934) was an Indian banker, businessman and Muslim community leader who served as a member of the Madras Legislative Council.

== Early life and education ==
Ismail Sait was born in March 1859 to Hajee Saliah Muhammad Sait of Bangalore. In 1870, his family moved to Bangalore when the British established their cantonment. Four years later, when his father died, the 15-year-old Ismail Sait plunged into the business of buying and selling goods. Through his various businesses, he catered to the needs of the British.

== Career ==
Hajee Sir Ismail Sait's first commercial venture was a shop called the English Warehouse. He later diversified into a variety of businesses. By the early 1900s, Ismail Sait was one of the richest merchants, not just in Bangalore, but in all of south India. His first commercial venture seems to have been an extremely successful shop called the English Warehouse, strategically located on St Mark's Road, close to where his (mainly English) customers were. The shop sold all manner of goods from milk powder to machinery, everything imported from England. The shop flourished and soon, there were branches of English Warehouse in Chennai and Secunderabad too.

Very quickly, Ismail Sait built on the success of his shop and diversified into an astonishing variety of businesses. At the age of 22, he became a director in the newly-established Carnatic Mills (which later merged with another mill to become the well-known Binny Mills). He owned and operated mines in Kolar Gold Fields and Shimoga. He supplied various provisions to the British army establishment in Bangalore, including horse gram. He traded in timber. He ran a distillery and a carbonic acid manufacturing unit in Calcutta. He also served as director in the Mysore Sandalwood Oil company, the Mysore Sugar company and the Bhadravathi Iron Works.

Also Ismail Sait served as Chairman and Director of the Mysore Bank Limited, Bhadrawathi Iron Works and the Mysore Government Sandalwood Factory. Sait also constructed a number of mosques and hospitals in Bangalore, Madras and Bombay.

== Honours ==
Sait was made a Khan Bahadur in 1911 and knighted in 1923. Sait Colony, a locality in Egmore, Chennai is named after him.

In 1888, became a magistrate in Bangalore.

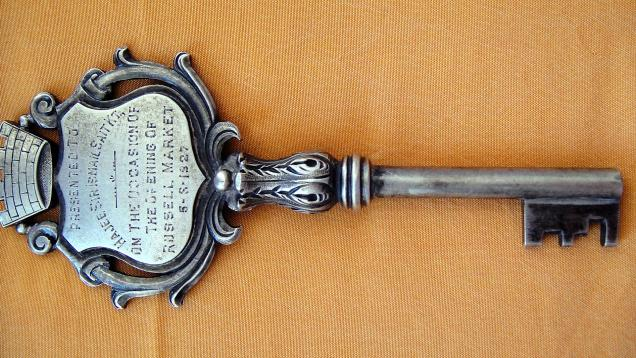
Russell Market Key Replica Made in Silver.

Eighty-five years ago, when the market was opened, a Bangalorean was given a replica of the key to the market by the British, who built it. Hajee Sir Ismail Sait, businessman and philanthropist, was invited by the British to inaugurate Russell Market on August 5, 1927. The British also handed over a memento — the replica of the key.

Ismail Sait was nominated as a member of the Madras Legislative Council in 1911. In 1923, the then Mysore Government conferred the title Fakhr-ut-Tajjar on him and the King of England knighted him.

Being successful in business was not the reason for honours being heaped upon Ismail Sait. Throughout his life, he donated generously to many causes. His most well-known act of charity was to donate Rs 1,50,000 towards the construction of the Gosha hospital in Bangalore, set up so that women who observed purdah could also avail of modern medical care. The hospital opened in 1925. He also donated the land and Rs 50,000 to build the mosque in Fraser Town that still bears his name.
