= Dunedin Hospital =

Main hospital in Dunedin, New Zealand

- Southern District Health Board
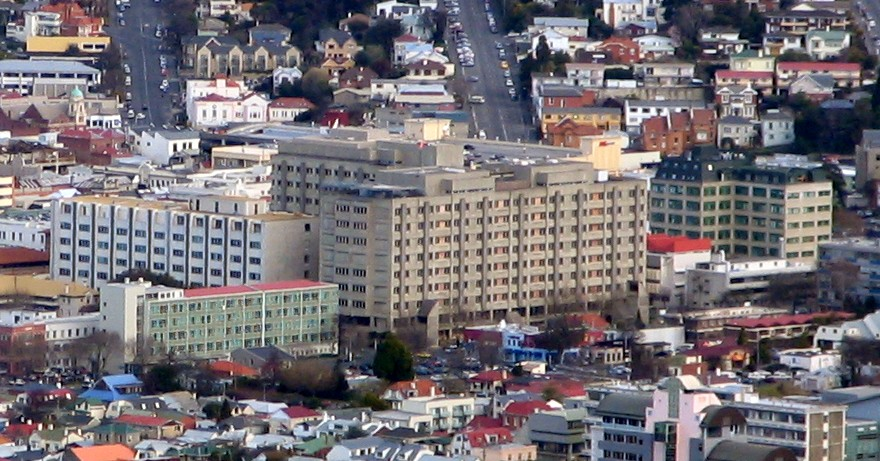
- Dunedin Hospital from Signal Hill

Geography
- Location: Dunedin, New Zealand, Otago, New Zealand
- Coordinates: 45.8694°S 170.5086°E

Organisation
- Care system: Public
- Type: Teaching, District General
- Affiliated university: University of Otago

Services
- Emergency department: Yes
- Beds: 398 (as of 2023)

Helipads
- Helipad: ICAO: NZDH

History
- Founded: 1851

Links
- Website: www.southernhealth.nz
- Lists: Hospitals in New Zealand

Dunedin Hospital is the main public hospital in Dunedin, New Zealand. It serves as the major base hospital for the Otago and Southland regions with a potential catchment radius of roughly 300 kilometres, and a population catchment of around 330,000.

== Operations ==
Dunedin Hospital is New Zealand's largest hospital south of Christchurch. Patients are transferred or sent to this tertiary level care hospital from smaller secondary care hospitals across Otago and Southland including Dunstan Hospital in Clyde, Lakes District Hospital in Queenstown and Oamaru, Gore and Invercargill hospitals. Dunedin Hospital is the major trauma centre for the Otago region and the tertiary major trauma centre for the Otago and Southland regions.

Dunedin Hospital is operated by the Southern District Health Board, formed by the amalgamation of the Otago District Health Board and Southland District Health Board. It is located in the central business district of Dunedin close to the University of Otago, occupying the city block bounded by Great King Street, Hanover Street, Cumberland Street and Frederick Street. It is an approximately 400-bed tertiary hospital and is affiliated with the University of Otago. It has approximately 3,000 staff members.

=== Queen Mary Maternity Centre ===
Dunedin Hospital includes the Queen Mary Maternity Centre. The maternity unit directly replaced the nearby Queen Mary Hospital, which opened in 1937. Queen Mary in turn directly replaced the Batchelor Hospital, originally known as Forth Street Maternity Hospital.

=== Helipad ===
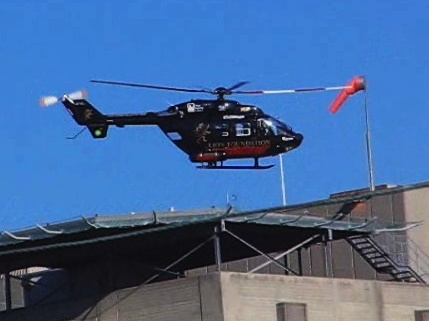
The Otago Regional Rescue Helicopter taking off from the hospital helipad

The Ward Block building has a helipad on the roof of the northeast corner (ICAO: NZDH). The building was designed with consideration for a helipad, and, after substantial fundraising, one was built on the roof in c. 2000. The hospital helipad improves patient care, reducing the need for ambulance transfers between a remote helipad and the hospital. Due to CAA safety requirements, only "Performance Class One" (twin-engined) helicopters are allowed to land on the hospital.

== History ==
The original hospital was built at The Octagon in 1851, and moved to the site of the present hospital in 1865.

The original buildings were gradually replaced and new structures extended the site, most notably in the late 1930s. Many of these buildings were demolished in the mid to late 1970s, with a new central ward and administrative block opened in 1980.

=== 2007 Norovirus outbreak ===
In March 2007 two wards of the hospital were closed due to a suspected outbreak of norovirus, thought to have been brought in by a patient. On 16 August 2008 the hospital was put in lockdown for one week due to a norovirus outbreak affecting 73 patients and nearly 100 staff, blocking most visitors for the duration, and postponing 2,300 procedures.

=== COVID-19 pandemic ===
In early June 2022, the Dunedin Hospital was closed to visitors following an outbreak of COVID-19 within its wards.

=== Rebuild ===
==== Sixth Labour Government, 2017–2023 ====
During the 2017 New Zealand general election, the opposition Labour Party campaigned on commencing the rebuilding of the Dunedin Public Hospital before the 2020 New Zealand general election and completing the rebuild before the 2027 timeframe claimed by the-then National-led government. Ultimately, the Labour coalition government failed to deliver this campaign promise by 2020 and pushed back the completion date to 2029.

Parts of the hospital are significantly dated, especially the Clinical Services Block (erected 1965) which was constructed with asbestos, as was standard construction practice at the time. The Clinical Services Block has also had significant maintenance issues, such as asbestos and leaks in the roof which allowed rain water to seep into the main operating theatres during a storm. As a result of these and other issues, a significant rebuild project is underway for the reconstruction of the entire hospital, headed by Pete Hodgson, at an estimated cost of $1.2 to 1.6 billion. It is estimated to be completed by 2028.

On 4 May 2018, Health Minister David Clark announced that the Government would be building a new public hospital on the site of the former Cadbury factory site and a neighbouring block that included the building occupied by Work and Income. The construction project is estimated to cost NZ$1.4 billion, would involve around a thousand workers, and is expected to finish by 2026. Clark confirmed that the Government had purchased the former Cadbury factory site from Mondelez for an undisclosed sum. While the Government has ruled out private-public partnership, Clark has told Stuff that the Government has not ruled out iwi investment.

In September 2022, the Otago Daily Times reported that the budgetary concerns had led the Ministry of Health to consider reducing the new hospital's capacity including reducing the number and size of beds, operating theatres, and wards. The hospital's budget had increased from NZ$1.2 billion to NZ$1.47 billion due to inflation and the rising costs of building materials. In response, National List MP Michael Woodhouse expressed outrage that the Government was considering reducing the number of beds and services. In late October 2022, a report by Te Whatu Ora Southern expressed concern that efforts to trim NZ$100 million from the hospital rebuilding budget could pose a "reputational, operational and clinical risk" to the public hospital.

In December 2022, the Otago Daily Times and Radio New Zealand confirmed that Te Whatu Ora would be reducing the number of beds and operating theatres as part of a "value management exercise" to manage a NZ$200 million budget increase in the Dunedin hospital rebuild. While the Government had earlier invested an additional NZ$110 million in the Dunedin hospital rebuild, there was still a shortfall of NZ$90 million. In order to cover the shortfall, the number of beds would be reduced from 421 to 398 beds, the number of operating theatres would be reduced from 28 to 26, the number of MRI scanners would be reduced from three to two, and the PET-CT scanner would be delayed. In response, National Party MP Michael Woodhouse criticised the Government for delaying the hospital rebuild project and abandoning its promise not to reduce the hospital's capacity.

Though Mayor of Dunedin Jules Radich initially supported the proposed cutbacks to the hospital and described the redesign as a "reasonable compromise," he revised his position in the face of opposition to the proposed cutbacks from the Dunedin public and fellow Dunedin councillors including David Benson-Pope, who announced plans to submit a motion calling on the Dunedin City Council (DCC) to campaign for the hospital to be rebuilt according to its original specifications.

On 18 January 2023, the Otago Daily Times reported that a pavilion building dedicated to providing staff workspaces and other staff facilities had been eliminated from the final design of the new hospital Te Whatu Ora had also confirmed that it would cut more than 450 non-clinical spaces. In response, the Association of Salaried Medical Specialists southern representative Kris Smith expressed concern about the proposed loss of individual workspaces on the morale and well-being of medical professionals including having to wear facemasks and working from home for non-clinical duties. In response to criticism from Mayor Radich, Health Minister Little denied that the Government's revised hospital plans would involve cuts. He also stated that the new hospital would have a larger capacity than the present hospital including 26 surgical theatres rather than the current 16 theatres. In addition, the New Zealand Nurses Organisation organised a petition opposing the cutbacks and urging the Government to build the inpatient building as outlined in the original business case.

In opposition to the proposed cuts, Benson-Pope filed a notice of motion urging the DCC to contribute NZ$130,400 for a public campaign to support the hospital rebuild project as it was outlined in the final business case. Benson-Pope's motion was seconded by Mayor Radich. On 31 January, the DCC voted unanimously to support Benson-Pope's motion to fight changes to the Dunedin Hospital's design. On 1 February, incoming Health Minister Ayesha Verrall confirmed that she would meet with Dunedin City councillors to discuss their concerns about the hospital rebuild changes. Dunedin electorate MP and former Health Minister Clark also rejected criticism by Councillor Carmen Houlahan that local Labour electorate MPs were not doing enough to advocate for the Dunedin hospital.

In early March 2023, the Otago Daily Times reported that staff vacancies and a large number of patients had forced the hospital to postpone some "planned care." A Te Whatu Ora spokesperson reported that other hospitals nationwide were facing similar staffing and service problems. On 25 March, the DCC rejected Te Whatu Ora's and the Government's proposed cutbacks to the hospital rebuild and launched a campaign urging public opposition against the cutbacks. On 27 March, the Council heard submissions from several health professionals opposed to the proposed cutbacks including senior surgical trainee Dr Janet Rhodes and former Southern District Health Board member Dr Jonathan Chambers.

On 14 April, Verrall confirmed that the Government had reversed NZ$10 million in hospital cuts and announced the return of the hospital scanner and a collaborative space for clinicians to work. In addition, the Government allocated NZ$97 million to the hospital's data and digital infrastructure. However, Verrall ruled out further substantial "redesigns" and confirmed that the hospital rebuild would proceed along the revised hospital plans. The Government's announcement was welcome by Radich, who confirmed that construction of the new hospital had begun.

On 16 June 2023, Te Whatu Ora along with the University of Otago and Otago Polytechnic abandoned plans to establish an Interprofessional Learning Centre at the new Dunedin Hospital site due to escalating costs. The building would have served as an educational facility for Otago University and Polytechnic students at the new hospital. Instead, the three organisations would focus on developing interdisciplinary training for future healthcare professionals.

During the 2023 New Zealand general election, the National Party campaigned on reversing some of the Government's cuts to the Dunedin Hospital if elected into Government. In early July 2023, Luxon announced that National would invest NZ$30 million in restoring cut beds, theatres, and a PET scanner at the new Dunedin Hospital. On 12 September 2023, the Labour Government announced that it would reverse two proposed cuts, namely a separate pathology laboratory and 24 beds for elderly mental health patients.

Dunedin Hospital's older north wing building.

==== Sixth National Government, 2023–present ====
In mid January 2024, Health Minister Shane Reti announced that the National-led coalition government was committed to the new Dunedin hospital but did not confirm whether it would honour its NZ$30 million election pledge. In May 2024, the Otago Daily Times reported that construction costs at Dunedin Hospital had spiralled above NZ$2 billion. Health New Zealand also faced a six-month delay in the expected start of the construction of the inpatient building. In June 2024, Reti reiterated that the National-led government was open to keeping its campaign promise of restoring previously cut beds, operating theatres and equipment for the new Dunedin Hospital.

In mid-August 2024, 1News reported that Health New Zealand was planning smaller hospital builds and reusing existing infrastructure to avoid the delays and cost blowouts experienced during the Dunedin Hospital rebuild. On 3 September, the Otago Daily Times reported that the Government was considering cutting emergency beds and downgrading operating theatres as part of efforts to slash spending on the new Dunedin hospital. Association of Salaried Medical Specialists chief executive Sarah Dalton expressed concerns about the cutbacks while Dunedin Mayor Jules Radich said that any reduction of facilities and services were contrary to the Government's promises made to Dunedin, Otago and Southland residents. On 6 September, Radich and the Dunedin City Council issued a unified call for the Dunedin hospital rebuild to proceed without clinical cuts.

On 17 September 2024, Radich and New Zealand Nurses' Organisation delegate Linda Smillie met with Health Minister Reti to present a 23,000 strong petition opposing the previously proposed cuts to the New Dunedin Hospital. On 19 September, Mayor Radich and the Dunedin City Council launched Hospital Cuts Hurt campaign to opposed clinical cuts to the hospital rebuilt. The campaign included a protest march on 28 September.

On 26 September, Reti and Minister of Infrastructure Chris Bishop announced that the rebuilding of the Dunedin Hospital would be scaled back significantly, stating that the current hospital plans could not be delivered within its current NZ$1.88 billion budget. Bishop expressed concerns that the Hospital rebuild could balloon to NZ$3 billion due to the inclusion of other things that had not been budgeted for including a pathology laboratory, refurbishment of the existing site and car parking. Bishop expressed concern that a full rebuild based on the original plans could divert resources from other regional hospitals needing refurbishing. Bishop and Reti also confirmed that the Government was seeking advice on two options to keep the project within budget. The first option would be to revise the project's specification and scope within the existing structural envelop by reducing its capacity and services. The second option involves a staged redevelopment of the current hospital site, including a new clinical services building and refurbishing the existing ward tower.

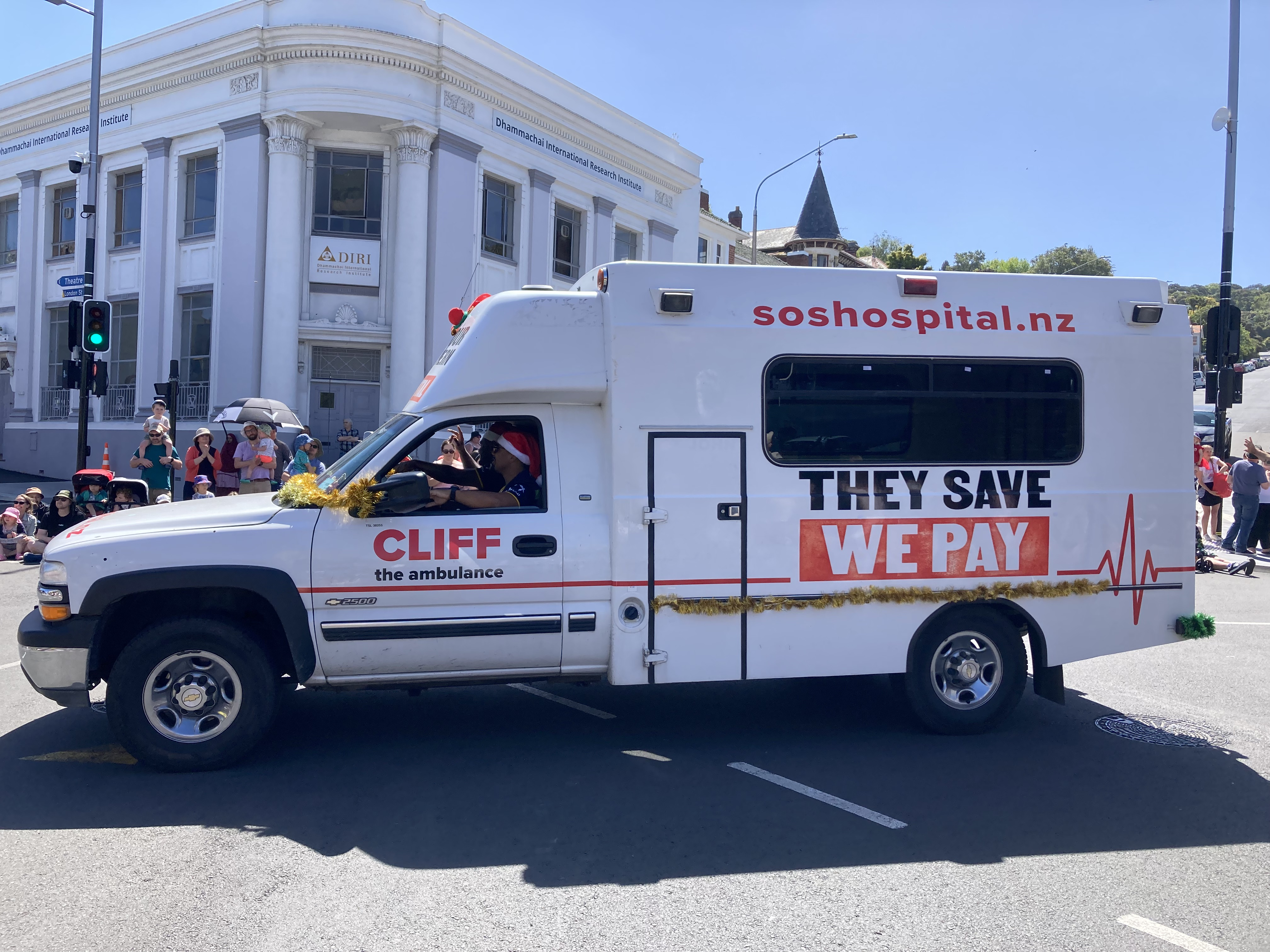
Cliff the Ambulance in the Dunedin Santa Parade in 2024

The Government's proposals to downgrade the construction of Dunedin Hospital were denounced as "completely unacceptable" by Mayor Radich, who confirmed a protest march against the cutbacks would be held on 28 September. Former Labour cabinet minister Pete Hodgson described the Government's options as unacceptable while Labour associate health spokesperson Tracey McLellan accused the Government of breaking its promises. On 28 September, 35,000 people gathered in Dunedin's Octagon to protest against the Government's proposed cutbacks to the Dunedin hospital redevelopment and demand that the Government keep its election promise to rebuild the hospital without cuts.

On 14 October, Mayor of Invercargill Nobby Clark and several Invercargil councillors expressed support for the "They Save, We Pay" campaign for Dunedin Hospital. Clark said he opposed the Government's proposed budget cuts since the hospital was a "vital lifeline" to people across the Otago and Southland regions. On 16 October, 44 clinical directors across the southern region issued a letter warning that the Government's proposed cuts and delays to the new Dunedin hospital would affect the hospital's abilities to provide a strong regional tertiary service and quality clinical training to New Zealand medical professionals.

On 5 November a 34,000 signature petition was delivered to MP Rachel Brooking at Parliament by the Dunedin, Waitaki and Invercargill mayors, using Cliff the Ambulance, a repurposed St John vehicle.

On 31 January 2025, Health Minister Simeon Brown announced that a new inpatient building would be built on the site of the former Cadbury factory at a cost of NZ$1.9 billion. Brown also ruled out refurbishing the old hospital site. He also said the new hospital would have 351 beds as opposed to the old hospital's 396 beds. Other facilities included 20 short-stay surgical beds, 24 theatres, 58 emergency department spaces and 20 imaging units for CT, MRI and X-ray procedures. Brown's announcement was greeted by 35,000 protesters opposed to the cutbacks to the new hospital design. Dunedin Mayor Radich welcomed the Government's announcement, stating "What we've got is the right structure being built as planned, and that was our message to the minister – step one is to build the structure. Clearly, there are some things we're not getting all at once, but there's a clear intention to provide them."

In late April 2025, Health New Zealand confirmed that it would reduce the number of ICU beds on opening to 20, with room to increase to 40 beds in the future. Former health chief Dr John a chambers expressed concern that reducing the number of ICU beds would affect healthcare in the Southern region. On 2 May, the Otago Daily Times reported that Health New Zealand had plans to reduce the number of mental health beds for elderly people from 24 to eight. University of Otago associate professor of psychiatry Dr Yoram Barak expressed concerns about plans to slash the number of mental health beds. On 23 May, Health New Zealand released details of its bed cutting plans to the Otago Daily Times. These including reducing the number of maternity beds from 23 to 22, elderly mental health service beds from 21 to 8, rehabilitation ward beds from 40 to 16, ICU/surgical ward beds from 40 to 20. In total, the rebuilt hospital will reopen with 371 instead of 430 beds, with the potential raise the capacity to 424 beds over time.

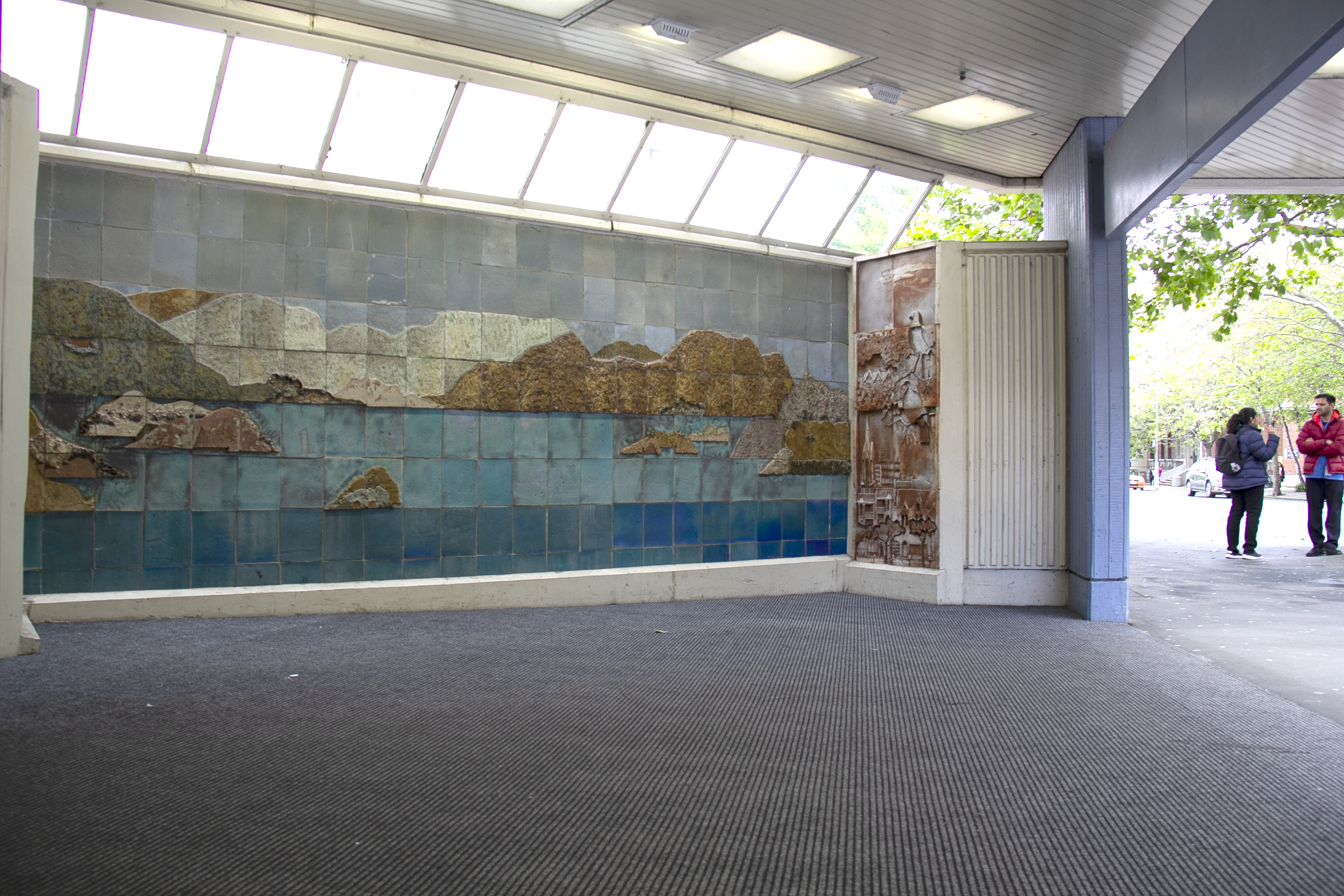
The entrance to Dunedin Hospital which features a mural by Neil Grant made of ceramic tiles, which was commissioned in 1984.

On 3 July 2025, Health Minister Brown released a timeline of the Dunedin Hospital construction. The early construction phase is expected to begin in July 2026 and will involve laying 134 steel-reinforced concrete pile caps. In addition, early construction will involve laying 4,300 cubic metres of concrete and 490 tonnes of reinforcing steel on the site. The second phase is expected to start in January 2026. It will involve subculture works, including installing lower slab, concreting, and plinths for base isolators to ensure the hospital remains operational during earthquakes or natural disasters. The third phase is expected to commence in July 2026 and will involve laying base isolators. Steel structure construction is expected to commence in August 2026. The NZ$1.88 billion hospital will house 351 beds and is expected to open in 2031.

A government report dated November 2025 confirmed that the new outpatient building would open in 2026, but identified a large number of high or very high risks associated with staffing and operating the hospital, due to the five-year delay between the opening of the in-patient and out-patients buildings. The report was described as a "bombshell".

== Notable people ==
- Colin Bouwer (born 1950) – head of psychiatry and convicted criminal
- Isabella Fraser (1857–1932) – matron from 1893 to 1910
- Hardwicke Knight (1911–2008) — director of the medical photographic unit, archivist and historian
- Jim Mann (born 1944) – endocrinologist
- Edward Hulme (1812–1875) – administrator
- Edith Statham (1853–1951) – nurse
- Jessie Torrance (1874–1949) – nurse and Presbyterian deaconess
