= Mosque Road =

Street in Fraser Town, Bangalore, India

Coordinates: 12°59′55.11″N 77°36′47.87″E

Mosque Road is a Road in Fraser Town, Bengaluru, India, that links MM Road with Coles Road. The road is a commercial centre and one of the busiest shopping areas of Bangalore. Iftar celebration in this road is particularly well-known. There are a large number of eateries here, and that's why the road is also known as "Foodies' paradise".The road is named mosque road because it leads to the Haji Sir Ismail Sait Mosque.

== Iftar celebration ==
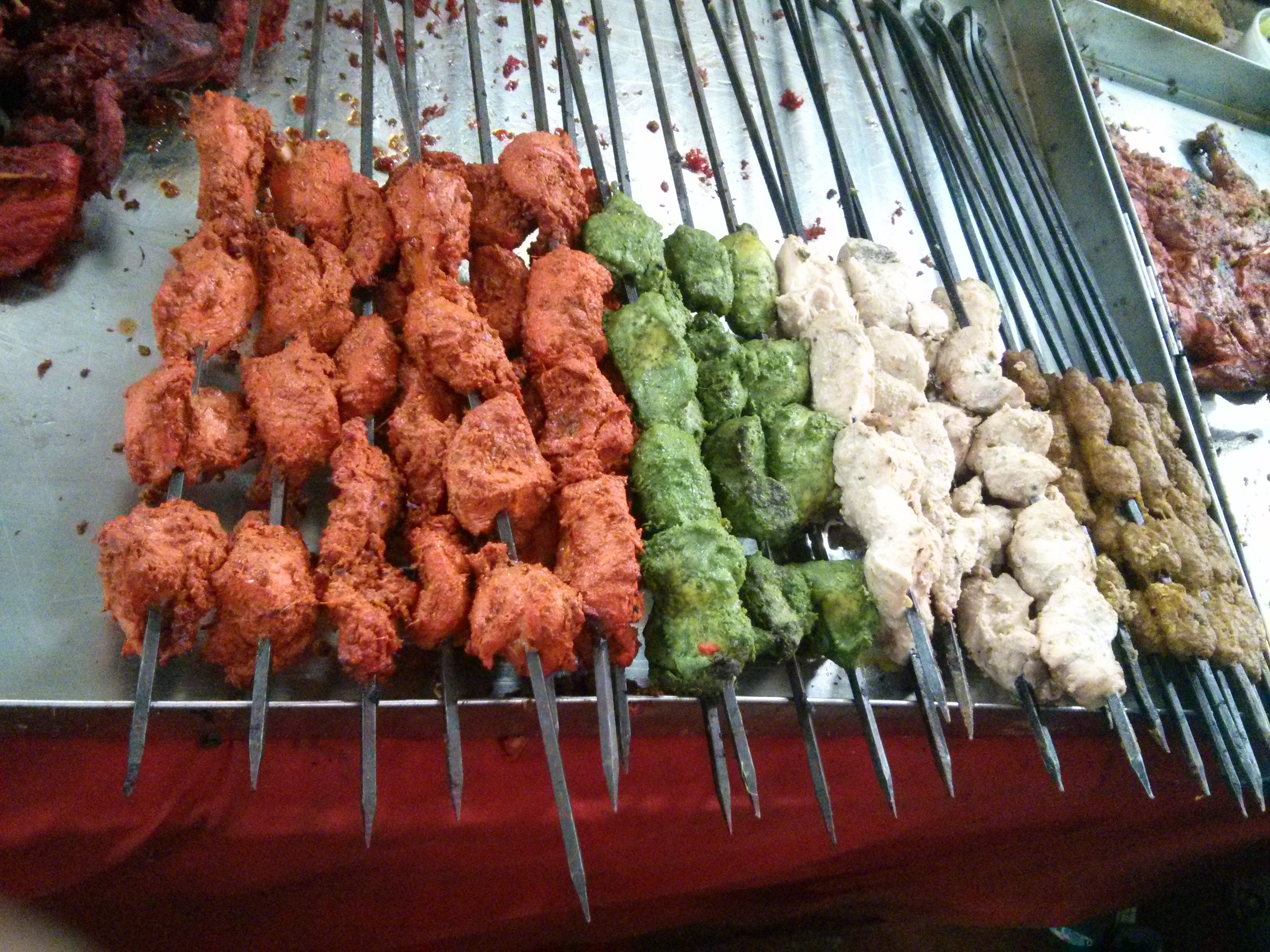
Kebabs being sold during Ramadan

There are a number of mosques in this area. Iftar (Note: The evening meal when Muslims end their daily Ramadan fast at sunset) is celebrated here every year. Both the sides of the road are decorated lights and thousands of people gather here in the evenings for their Iftar feast. Samosas, kebabs, pathar ka gosht, different varieties of biryani are sold.

== Shopping centres ==
There are a large number of shopping centres, retail outlets, eateries and stalls in this street. Because of having so many eateries and restaurants the place is also known as "Foodies' paradise". There are a few hotels as well. Traffic jams and unsystematic vehicle parking are serious problems in this area. In July 2015 Bangalore city traffic police marked the road as a "model" road, and disallowed vehicles anywhere in the road other than a few designated parking areas. Right after that business and selling in the area reportedly decreased by 30-50%, as people were reluctant to walk extra. However, the residents of that area found this traffic rule useful. This also affected the Iftar celebration of this year.
