= Governor Daly =

Governor Daly may refer to:

- Dominick Daly (1798–1868), Governor of Prince Edward Island from 1854 to 1859 and Governor of South Australia from 1862 to 1868
- Henry Daly (1823–1895), Governor General of India from 1870 to 1881
