= Arthur Daly =

Arthur Daly or Daley may refer to:

- Arthur Daly (cricketer) (1833–1898), English first-class player for Middlesex in 1866
- Arthur Daly (British Army officer) (1871–1936), senior commander in Boer War and First World War
- Arthur Daley (sportswriter) (1904–1974), American recipient of Pulitzer Prize for The New York Times

== Fictional characters ==
- Arthur Daley, unscrupulous Londoner played by George Cole in 1979 British TV series Minder
