= Virajpet Clock Tower =

Clock tower in Karnataka, India

- Clock Tower
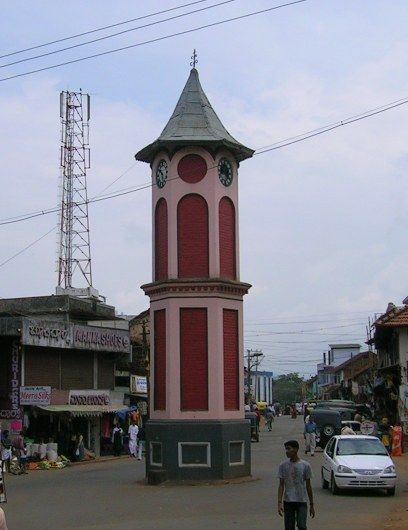
- Interactive map of Virajpet Clock Tower
- Location: Virajpet
- Coordinates: 12.1970°N 75.8023°E
- Type: Memorial
- Beginning date: 5 February 1914
- Opening date: January 1915
- Dedicated to: Commemorate the coronation of King George V

Virajpet Clock Tower is a clock tower in the town of Virajpet in Kodagu district, in the Indian State of Karnataka. The tower was built to commemorate the coronation of George V at the Delhi Durbar in 1911, and was inaugurated in 1915. To mark its centenary, a philatelic cover was released by Karnataka Postal Circle on 16 January 2015.

== History ==
The piece of land for the construction of the clock tower was donated to the Virajpet Town Municipal Corporation by the Mukkatira family of Kodavas residing in a village Devanageri near Virajpet at the time.

The foundation stone of the tower was laid by then Chief Commissioner of Coorg, Sir Hugh Daly on 5 February 1914. Following 11 months of construction work, it was inaugurated in January 1915, by then District Magistrate R. K. Ellis in January 1915.
