= Brafferton, North Yorkshire =

Village and former civil parish in North Yorkshire, England

Coordinates: 54°07′33″N 1°19′51″W

Brafferton
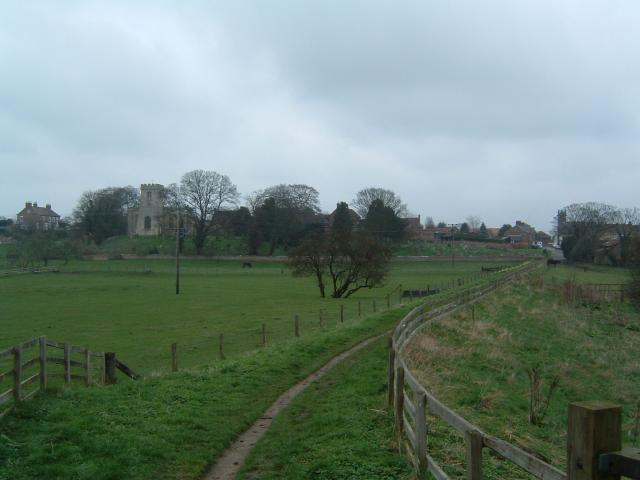
- Brafferton

- Location within North Yorkshire
- Population: 311 (Including Fawdington. 2011 census)
- OS grid reference: SE440702
- Civil parish: Brafferton and Helperby
- Unitary authority: North Yorkshire
- Ceremonial county: North Yorkshire
- Region: Yorkshire and the Humber
- Country: England
- Sovereign state: United Kingdom
- Post town: YORK
- Postcode district: YO61
- Dialling code: 01423
- Police: North Yorkshire
- Fire: North Yorkshire
- Ambulance: Yorkshire

Brafferton is a village and former civil parish, now in the parish of Brafferton and Helperby, in the county of North Yorkshire, England. According to the 2001 census it had a population of 257, increasing to 311 at the 2011 Census. On 1 April 2019 the parish was merged with Helperby to form Brafferton and Helperby.

The village is situated about ten miles south of Thirsk, on the River Swale. It is contiguous with the village of Helperby, one street has properties in one village on one side and the other opposite. The village takes its name from a ford across the Swale, it being originally Broad-Ford-Town, and now by contraction, Brafferton.

From 1974 to 2023 it was part of the Hambleton District, it is now administered by the unitary North Yorkshire Council.

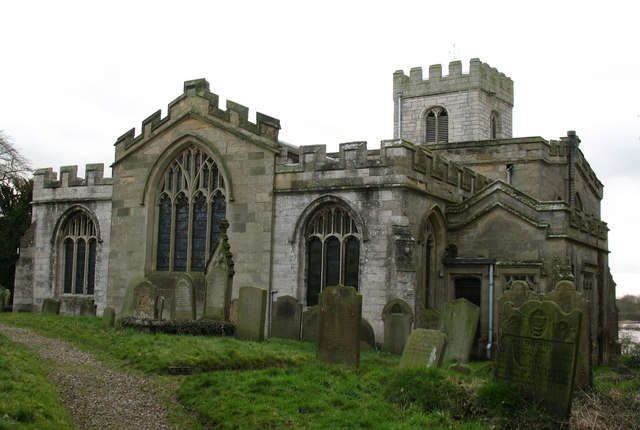
St Peter's parish church

St Peter's Church, Brafferton was built in the 15th century, modified in 1826 by the architect James Pritchett and restored in 1878. It is a grade II* listed building. An unusual feature of the church is that the battlemented nave is wider than it is long. On the outside wall of the chancel are carved the arms of the Neville family. Underneath is the Latin inscription: "orate pro animo Radulphi Neville fundatoris hujus Ecclesioe - soi deo honor et gloria!" (Pray for the soul of Ralph Neville, founder of this Church- To God the honour and glory). On the largest bell is inscribed "Radulphus Neville Armiger, I.H.S. 1598".

Norman M'Neile, known as "the blind vicar", served at St Peter's for 50 years. He was completely blind from the age of 12.

== History ==
Ralph Rymer, Lord of the Manor at the Restoration, was executed in 1664 for his part in the Farnley Wood Plot of 1663. His lands reverted to the Crown. His son was the author, critic and Historiographer Royal, Thomas Rymer.

== See also ==
- Listed buildings in Brafferton and Helperby
