= Frederick Spring =

British Army officer

Brigadier-General Frederick Spring CB CMG DSO JP
- Born: 25 July 1878; Bombay, India
- Died: 24 September 1963 (aged 85); Aldershot, Hampshire, England
- Relatives: Colonel Frederick William Spring (father)
- Military career
- Allegiance: United Kingdom
- Branch: British Army
- Service years: 1898–1935
- Rank: Brigadier-General
- Commands: Poona (Independent) Brigade Area (c. 1932–35); 1st Battalion, Royal Lincolnshire Regiment (1923–27); 33rd Infantry Brigade (1917–18); 11th Battalion, Essex Regiment (1916–17)
- Conflicts: Second Boer War; First World War
- Awards: Companion of the Order of the Bath; Companion of the Order of St Michael and St George; Distinguished Service Order; Mentioned in Despatches (5); Croix de guerre (France)

Brigadier-General Frederick Gordon Spring, CB, CMG, DSO, JP (25 July 1878 – 24 September 1963) was a senior British Army officer.

== Early life ==
Spring was born on 25 July 1878 in Bombay, India, the son of Colonel Frederick William Spring, a Royal Artillery officer. He was educated at Blundell's School and the Royal Military College, Sandhurst.

== Military career ==
Spring was commissioned as a subaltern into the Lincolnshire Regiment (later the Royal Lincolnshire Regiment) as a second lieutenant on 7 May 1898, and promoted to lieutenant on 3 January 1900.

He served with the regiment in South Africa during the Second Boer War, which began in October 1899, and from June 1900 he took part in operations in Transvaal. He was again seconded for service in South Africa in April 1902, when he commanded a mounted infantry contingent.

The war ended just a few weeks later, and Spring left Cape Town in the SS Dunera in late September 1902, arriving at Southampton early the following month.

He was back with his regiment in January 1903 and was adjutant of the 2nd Battalion of his regiment between 1904 and 1907, and was promoted to captain in 1905. He retired from the army in 1907, but was recalled to service at the outbreak of the First World War.

=== First World War ===
Spring initially served as an embarkation officer, but was soon posted to the staff of the 33rd (Infantry) Brigade as its signals officer. He was promoted to major, dated back to April 1915, and deployed to Gallipoli with the brigade in 1915, and was involved in the successful capture of "Chocolate Hill" by the 6th (Service) Battalion of the Lincolnshire Regiment from Ottoman Empire forces during the Battle of Sari Bair. However, the battalion suffered heavy losses and Spring himself was injured in the action.

Upon recovery he took command of the 11th (Service) Battalion, Essex Regiment and was granted the temporary rank of lieutenant colonel while employed in this role. The battalion at the time was engaged on the Western Front with the 6th Division. Whilst in this position Spring presided over a divisional court martial that sentenced Private Harry Farr of the 1st Battalion, West Yorkshire Regiment, to death for cowardice. Spring commanded the 11th Essex Regiment during the Battle of the Somme, and at the Battle of Cambrai. He was promoted to colonel in 1918. In September 1918 he returned to the 33rd Brigade as its brigadier-general. He was Mentioned in Despatches five times over the course of the war. He was also awarded the Croix de guerre by the French government.

=== Post-war career ===
Following the end of the First World War, Spring was appointed Senior Instructor at the Senior Officers' School, Belgaum, India from January 1921 to September 1922. Returning to England, Spring continued to serve with the Lincolnshire Regiment, commanding the 1st Battalion between 1923 and 1927. In this capacity he was in charge of the battalion during its deployment to Northern Ireland from 1923 to 1924 in support of the Royal Ulster Constabulary.

Between 1927 and 1931, Spring was Assistant Quartermaster General of Southern Command in England. He was subsequently the commander of the Poona (Independent) Brigade Area, Southern Command, India until his retirement in 1935. From 1935 to 1939, he served as Inspector of Recruiting. During the Second World War, he worked on the Imperial General Staff at the War Office. He was also a Justice of the Peace.

== Death ==
Spring died in 1963 in Aldershot, Hampshire. There is a memorial in Lincoln Cathedral to his memory.

== Personal life ==
Spring married Violet Maud Turnbull, the granddaughter of Colonel Henry Law Maydwell, in late 1919. In 1933 Spring's nine-year-old son, John Gordon Spring, died after an accident while being shown around the Royal Navy battleship HMS Hood at Portsmouth. He accidentally fell 60 ft down an open hatch and died of injuries sustained the next day.

== Publications ==
- The History of the 6th (Service) Battalion Lincolnshire Regiment 1914 – 1919 (Written in the 1920s – first published in 2009 by Poacher Books)

Military offices
Preceded by Arthur Daly	Officer Commanding the 33rd Brigade; September 1917 – December 1918	Formation disbanded
