= Fred Goodwill =

English Methodist missionary (1874–1969)

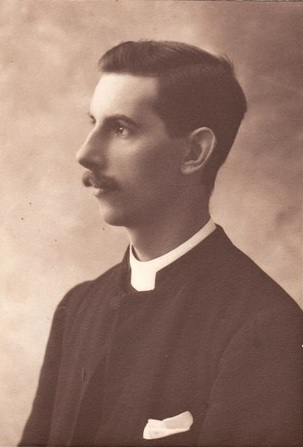
- Born: 20 February 1874; Helperby, York, England
- Died: 1 May 1969 (aged 95); Shropshire, England
- Resting place: Wolverhampton (cremated)
- Education: National School Helperby, Handsworth College
- Known for: Missionary, Superintendent of the Wesleyan Tamil Mission, Bangalore and Kolar Gold Fields, Linguist, Tamil Scholar, photographer
- Spouse: Alice Goodwill née. Haynes
- Children: 3

Fred Goodwill (20 February 1874 – 1 May 1969) was a British Methodist missionary stationed in Bangalore, British India, between 1899 and 1924, serving as the superintendent of the Wesleyan Tamil Mission, Bangalore, and Kolar Gold Fields. He is acknowledged for working for the cause of education of native women in the Bangalore Cantonment. The Goodwills Girls School located in Fraser Town, Bangalore Cantonment is named after him. He was a scholar of the Tamil Language, and was also fluent in Canarese (Kannada) and Telagu (Telugu). Fred is acknowledged as an authority on Tamil Shaiva Literature, with authors quoting from his research. As one of the founding members of the Mythic Society, his published papers on the history of the Mysore State form the basis of history of the State, as we know it now.

Fred Goodwill was a keen photographer and documented life in British India, especially life around the Bangalore Cantonment, with hundreds of photos. His photos are not only of churches and schools, but of ordinary people in India, with subjects such as butchers, tradesmen, travelling minstrels, friars, cooks, dhobhis, worshippers, and temples, monuments, etc. His pictures have recently evoked lot of interest in social media groups interested in Bangalore and Indian history. They were part of a group of photos exhibited at the Rangoli Metro Art Centre, Bangalore, in November 2013, and have appeared in many news articles on old Bangalore, and were also exhibited at the INTACH exhibition at Ulsoor. Many of his photos have been published in books published in British India and have also been published as Tucks India Series Postcards.

== Early life ==
Fred was the youngest child of farmers Thomas and Elizabeth Goodwill. His birth was registered in the first quarter of 1874 (Volume 9, p. 85) at Great Ouseburn. The family owned 56 acres of land and lived in the Main Street of Helperby. Fred's siblings were James (born 1857), Hannah (born 1859), Thomas (born 1860), Elizabeth (born 1868) and Pollie (born 1872).

Fred seemed to have a good start with his early education at the local Helperby school where he also taught other students. His entire family then contributed for his later education as he studied at the Handsworth Theological College, Birmingham. The family was deeply religious, and Fred had a genuine interest in working as a missionary. In those days it was not uncommon for the youngest son to take up religious work as it was seen as being a respectable profession which provided a steady income, but there is no suggestion that this was the reason why Fred joined the ministry.

== Marriage ==
Fred Goodwill met Alice Haynes, his future wife, presumably during his time at Handsworth. Alice lived at Old Hill and was a Primitive Methodist while Fred was a Wesleyan Methodist. According to their daughter Bessie Goodwill, Fred had a posting in India and decided to go first to sort out things and then call Alice. The couple were married in Tumkur, Mysore State, British India in 1901. Extract from the India's Daily Post "The marriage of Miss Alice Haynes, of Old Hill, Staffordshire with the Rev F. Goodwill, Superintendent of the Wesleyan Tamil Mission, took place at the Wesleyan Church, Tumkur on 10 September 1901.

== Life in India ==
India was a fascination for Fred, and he had a keen interest in its history, people, religions, scenery, and native languages. Fred Goodwill was a gifted linguist, and was said to speak any language like a native after just six months practice. He could speak, read and write fluently in Tamil, Telugu and Kannada. His research in Indian history was not merely for his own interest, but he also contributed papers for various societies on these subjects. He had a scholarly command over the languages. Fred loved the people and culture of India, and was actively involved in photography of Indian landscapes, buildings, common Indians, etc. Some of his pictures depict day-to-day life in British India, such as men working the land, women winnowing grains, wild haired fakirs, a child chained to a stone, mother bathing infants, goats about to be slaughtered, etc. It was as though he could not just get enough of India. Fred also authored articles and academic papers on South Indian History, Indian Religions (especially Shaivism) and Tamil Literature which were published in Journals. There is a mention of Fred Goodwill being appointed to the 'Committee on Temperance' of the South Indian Missionary Association in 1918–19, being appointed as General Secretary of the Bangalore Tract and Book Society and being part of the inaugural function of the Hudson Memorial Church, Bangalore on 23 September 1904.

Fred seems to have been part of group of photography enthusiasts and could have traveled in groups taking pictures of life in India. Some of his pictures closely resemble the description of the photos in the Ellis Collection: Album depicting missionary life in South India, of the British Library. Many pictures of the Ellis Collection also mention Rev. Goodwill. The Ellis Collection was presented to the British Library by the British naturalist Arthur Erskine Ellis, son of Rev. Robert Arthur Ellis, who was also a Wesleyan minister posted at Bangalore, serving as pastor of the John's Hill Church (now Wesley English Church), Promenade Road, which is just next to the Goodwills Girls School Campus, around the same time as Fred.

=== Mythic Society ===
Fred Goodwill was one of the founding members of the Mythic Society, Bangalore and also served the council as Branch Secretary for the year 1917–18, (the council also included names such as the Maharaja of Mysore and the Maharaja of Baroda), with the society journal reporting that his talks attracted large audiences. Goodwill also researched for the Mystic Society and wrote for its quarterly journal, the early history of Kolar Gold Fields, Mysore, Bangalore and South India in general. His scholarly work on the 'Prison Song in Bangalore', based on the experiences of 'A Narrative of the Captivity and Sufferings of the Officers, Soldiers and Sepoys, who fell into the Hands of Hyder-Ali, after the Battle of Conjeveram (Kanchi), 10 September 1780', is acknowledged to be part of the history of Bangalore. In 2009, two of Fred Goodwill's articles – Nandidroog (1918); Hutridroog and Huliyurdroog (1924); previously published in the Quarterly journal of the Mythic Society [volumes 1–100] were among the 30 articles chosen to be re-published from the 100 volumes of the journal, as Gems of Scholarships: Archaeology & Antiquities Selected Articles from QJMS [1909–2009], in association with the Indian Council of Historical Research (ICHR).

=== Girls Education at the Bangalore Cantonment ===
Education of the Indians, especially women's education was very close to his heart. In British India, education of the girl child was considered a taboo by Hindus as well as Indian Christians. Bangalore had had a Wesleyan Girls school since 1851, and Fred Goodwill built on its foundations and improved the school to a great extent. In 1906, Fred Goodwill began to assist the principal of the school Ms. Sisterson, eventually becoming its manager. His wife, Alice also got actively involved in educating the children and took time to teach needlework and crafts. Fred Goodwill was keen to stress to importance of education of girls irrespective of any caste barriers in the Bangalore Cantonment. He once wrote in "preparing girls for future work we remember that we are preparing workers to hasten the time when foreign missionaries will be a thing of the past". In respect for his work at the Wesleyan Tamil School was renamed as Goodwills Girls School.

=== Contribution to Tamil ===
In his 26 years in India, Rev. Fred Goodwill contributed immensely to the education and progress of Tamil literature in Bangalore Cantonment. His name is associated with books on Tamil Literature published around that period in British India, and Fred Goodwill authored many academic articles on Tamil Literature, which were published in Journals. Fred's articles on Tamil literature are mainly on the Shaivism philosophy, Tiruvacakam, the poetry of the Shavite Saints Tirunavukkarasar, Manikkavacakar, Sundarar and Sambandar. Research done by Fred Goodwill is quoted by works of later authors of Dravidian culture, Shaiva Siddhanta and Ancient Tamil literature, along with that of George Uglow Pope. About the Tamil poetry and literature on Saiva Siddhanta he remarked "'Those who have studied the system unanimously agree that this eulogy is not a whit too enthusiastic or free worded. That the system is eclectic is at once apparent".

The Goodwills School still has a prize founded and named after Fred Goodwill for the student with the highest marks in Tamil in Year 10. His name carries respect and honour at the Wesley Tamil Church at Haines Road, Fraser Town Bangalore and at the Goodwills School.

=== Leaving India ===
Fred Goodwill left India in 1924. According to his daughter Fred did not want to leave India, but his wife wanted to return to England. On the one hand Fred was extremely sad to leave India after 25 years, but there was also happiness of the thought of seeing their children who were growing up in England. Before their departure, they received an address from the Wesley Tamil Church, Kolar Gold Fields, which read, "Many amongst us remember and recognise in you the slim young missionary who arrived in India. The Tamil churches on the Field are greatly indebted (to you) for the wise councils and valuable advice. We had in you, Sir, a spiritual leader, a guide and a sincere friend. Many of the poor children who were helped by you are now staunch pillars of the church".

There was also an address by the teachers of the Wesleyan Elementary Schools in Bangalore. Acknowledgement was made for services rendered for the cause of education in Bangalore. The address also talks about Fred Goodwill being the District Commissioner for Boy Scouts and Girl Guides, further thanking him for his contribution for the cause of girl's education by providing for boarding and High School. There is also a plea for the provision of a pension and provident fund for the teachers.

Signed by Wesleyan Mission Elementary School Teachers Bangalore as follows

- Yellagowduna Palyam – P.T. Ramasami Iyengar, Barnabas, T. N. Rangachar and Louisa Lazarus
- Ulsoor Girls School – Grace David, Lily David, S Thanammal, Rachel Abraham
- Markam Road Girls School – Gnanamani Samuel, Mangalabooshanam, Kanagammal (Signed in Tamil)
- Sluhar Baqo – E. Nedusudan, Maggie Ammal, Juhei Daniel, Lily Nathanniel, John Dharura Rao
- Artillery Lines – P. William, Esther Booshanam, 3 (Blank)
- Doddapetta (Dodakattappa?) – G Rajaratnam, G. Moses, Esther Rajaratnam
- Jhopmadiliar Street Girls – Alice Inanomoni, Rachel Jacob, Manomani Theophilus, Asirvatham Samuel, Sundary David
- Polyar Street (Pulliyar Koil St.?) Girls – Mercy D Joshua, H. Nathaniel, Miriyamma Rao (signed in Telugu), J. D. Tyllambal, M. Amaravathi, I. J. Ioulesor
- Rama Rao – Sub Asst Inspector of Schools, City & Military Station, Bangalore.

== Life in England ==
Fred Goodwill returned to a very different England, with the social order having undergo many changes. The privileged lifestyle enjoyed in India, could not be replicated in England. Fred was offered work in Cornwall, which he refused in favour of working in the Black Country. During his time he was reminded a lot of life in India, and sadly did not take any photos on returning to England. Fred's interest in languages, helped him to speak the Black Country accent. Fred read Old English and Middle English fluently, and these skills were self-taught. He continued to keep reading the bible in Tamil and sing Tamil and Canarese hymns. Additionally he would read the Bible in Latin, Greek and Hebrew. When the first Commonwealth migrants started to come to England, he would stop and chat with them. Speaking in Tamil with those who knew it would be a pleasant surprise for them.

== Retirement and death ==
On retirement, Fred and Alice lived at 32, Honor Avenue, Goldthorn Park, Wolverhampton. Fred was a keen reader of books, and as he grew older he could no longer go to the library, and his daughter Bessie would bring the books for him. Fred also loved music and was an accomplished piano player. He listened to classical music and was also a good singer. He absolutely hated television. He continued to write articulate letters to friends and neighbours, which show his varied interests. Fred continued preaching even in his nineties and in one of his letters talks about a service he took at Darlington Street and further talks about Synod meeting, where he is the Precentor. He used to end his letters with Warmly yours. A 'Pilgrim'. In another letter he is critical of the increasing violent robberies, young people not respecting the law and of young people's obsession with the Beatles. He talks about a TV show of the Beatles in presence of the Queen Mother and comments that their performance was 'below proof'.

His wife Alice died in 1955, and Fred had to engage a house keeper to look after the house. His son also named Fred became an army chaplain and then a vicar, and pre-deceased his father. His daughter Helen Margaret became a French teacher and his other daughter Bessie became a doctor. Even in his eighties, he would cycle to his daughter Bessie's house, six miles away in Codsall to trim the hedge, which was a tough job even for a young man. When he was 90 his house keeper retired, and Fred went on to live with his daughter Bessie and her husband John at their farm in Shropshire. He missed his independence, but kept himself busy walking around the farm. Fred Goodwill died in 1969, after breaking his arm in a fall.
