= Antoine Marie Tabard =

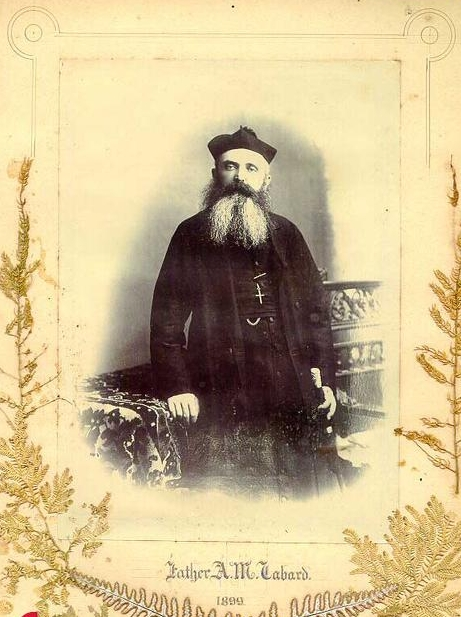

Father Antoine Marie Tabard or Anthony Marie Tabard (15 October 1863 – 2 July 1926) was a French Roman Catholic priest who worked in India as a priest and as the head of several educational institutions. He was given the title Rajasabhabhusana by the Mysore Kingdom and was a founding member of the Mythic Society. He was also a scholar of Tamil and Kannada and wrote on a variety of topics related to India.

== Biography ==
Tabard was born in Torigni-sur-Vire, Normandy, France. He was educated at home and then at Caen and received an MA from Paris in 1881. He was ordained priest in 1886 and went to India as part of the Society of Foreign Missions of Paris. Tabard taught mathematics, physics and chemistry at St. Joseph's College from 1891 to 1924. He studied Tamil under Father A. Reautearu. He was also chaplain at St. Patrick's church from 1891 and was involved in setting up an orphanage. He was awarded a Kaiser-i-Hind medal of the first class in 1914. In 1909 he was one of the founders of the Mythic Society along with F. J. Richards, Leslie Miller, J. S. Chakravarthy and others. He served as its president from 1912. He was made OBE in 1920 and shortly after was inducted into the Mysore durbar (royal court) with the title of "Rajasabhabhushana" (ornament of the royal court). He was involved in founding Mysore University. He was advised to go to Europe due to poor health and he visited France in 1925 and returned to India. He died in Bangalore.
