= The Life and Crimes of William Palmer =

1998 British television film

The Life and Crimes of William Palmer is a two-part, made-for-television British film released on ITV between 3 and 10 March 1998, and the story about the Victorian poisoner William Palmer. The film stars Keith Allen in the leading role, with a supporting cast that includes Judy Cornwell, Richard Coyle, Freddie Jones, Michael Murphy and Jayne Ashbourne. The production was shot in the North Yorkshire village of Helperby.
