= Thornton Bridge =

Civil parish in North Yorkshire, England

Coordinates: 54.135°N 1.353°W

- Civil parish
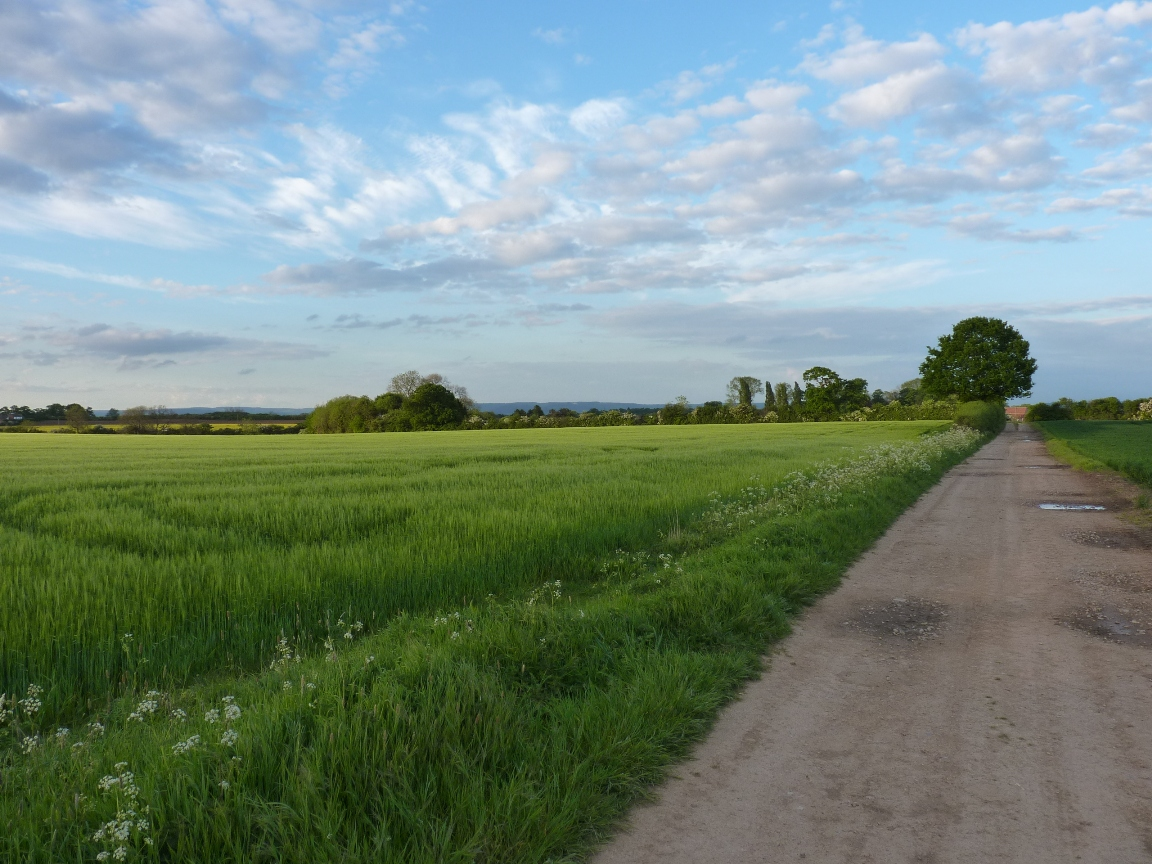
- Thornton Manor farm track

- Location within North Yorkshire
- OS grid reference: SE415709
- Unitary authority: North Yorkshire
- Ceremonial county: North Yorkshire
- Region: Yorkshire and the Humber
- Country: England
- Sovereign state: United Kingdom
- Post town: YORK
- Postcode district: YO61
- Police: North Yorkshire
- Fire: North Yorkshire
- Ambulance: Yorkshire

Thornton Bridge is a civil parish in North Yorkshire, England, situated between Boroughbridge to the south-west, and Thirsk to the north-east. The parish has no major settlements, just a few cottages clustered around the old manor of Thornton Bridge.

== History ==
Thornton Bridge was a township in the parish of Brafferton, but became its own civil parish in 1866. It was historically in the wapentakes of either Hallikeld or Bulmer, and in the historic county of the North Riding of Yorkshire. Since 1974, it has been in North Yorkshire, and until 2023, was a part of Harrogate District. The parish is 4 miles (6.4 km) north-east of Boroughbridge, and 1-mile (1.6 km) north of Brafferton. The Domesday Survey listed Thornton Bridge as being six carucates of land and belonging to Gospatric, however by the 13th century it was in the hands of the Mowbray family. In 1689, Roger Strickland was attainted and stripped of his estates after he was accused of accompanying James II to Ireland. Although accused of High Treason, he was exiled rather than executed as the evidence was weak.

Thornton Bridge, the structure over the River Swale at the east end of the parish, is an iron bridge which Pevsner described as a "handsome arched bridge of cast iron..". Previously the river was crossed by a stone bridge of three arches, which Leland described as "the depe and swift stream of Swale." The newer iron bridge dates back to 1865 and stretches in a single span of 98 feet (30 m) over the river. The structure was grade II listed in 1987. The bridge over the Swale lends its name to the parish, which was recorded as Torentone in the Domesday Book, and Thorenton on Swale in 1275. Thornton, like others in the region, derives from the Old English tūn (town) where the thorn bushes grow.

Thornton Bridge Hall was a manor-house in the area being the home of various noble families (Courtenay, Nevil, Tancard and Strickland), which was largely renovated in 1804.

== Governance ==
Details for the population of the parish are within the neighbouring parish of Humberton (to the south), which listed a total population of 11 people. In 2015, North Yorkshire County Council estimated the population to be 50. The parish is part of the Skipton and Ripon Constituency at Westminster. From 1974 to 2023 it was part of the Borough of Harrogate, it is now administered by the unitary North Yorkshire Council.

Population of Thornton Bridge 1801–2015
1801	1811	1821	1831	1841	1851	1861	1871	1881	1891	1901	1911	1921	1931	1951	1961	1971	2011	2015
362	318	378	407	427	371	360	359	55	55	48	66	74	70	56	53	40	50 (Note: Estimated population.)	50 (Note: Estimated population.)
