= St Peter's Church, Brafferton =

Parish church in North Yorkshire, England

Coordinates: 54°07′31″N 1°20′01″W

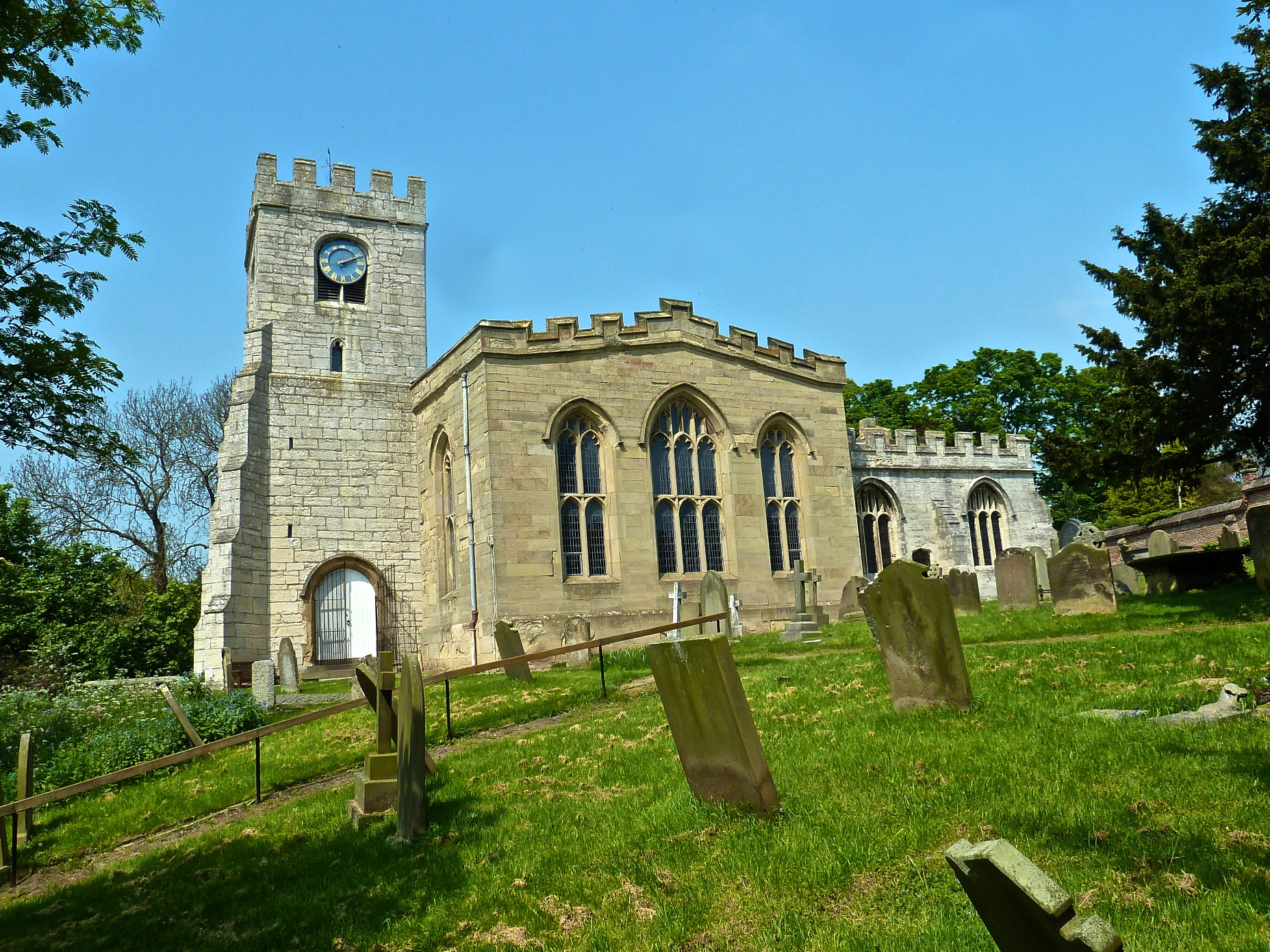
The church, in 2012

St Peter's Church is the parish church of Brafferton and Helperby, a village in North Yorkshire, in England.

The oldest surviving parts of the church are the chancel and tower, which date from the 15th century. At the time, the church was dedicated to Saint Augustine, but it was later rededicated to Saint Peter. The east chapels and arcade of the chancel were added in the 16th century by Ralph Nevill. Between 1826 and 1831, the nave and east wall of the chancel were rebuilt by James Pigott Pritchett. The church was restored in 1878, and a vestry was added in 1893. The building was Grade II* listed in 1960.

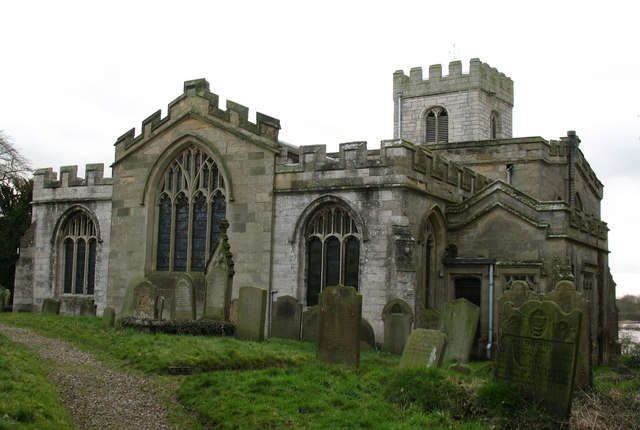
East end of the church

The church is built of sandstone, and the chancel has a slate roof. It consists of a nave wider than it is long, a chancel flanked by chapels, a northeast vestry, and a west tower. The tower has three stages, stepped angle buttresses, a south doorway, a three-light west window, two-light bell openings, a south clock face, and an embattled parapet. The nave, chancel and chapels also have embattled parapets.

Inside the church is a font with a 14th-century bowl. The east window and window of the south chapel have stained glass manufactured by Charles Eamer Kempe. The north chapel has a 16th-century coat of arms in its stained glass, and also has a stone slab with a carving of a pastoral staff, which may commemorate a Prior of Newburgh. One of the bells is Mediaeval, and another is dated 1598.

== See also ==
- Grade II* listed churches in North Yorkshire (district)
- Listed buildings in Brafferton and Helperby
