= 33rd Infantry Brigade (United Kingdom) =

33rd Brigade 33rd Infantry Brigade 33rd Independent Infantry Brigade (Guards)
- Formation badge of the brigade, utilising the 'Blue, Red, Blue' of the Guards Division
- Active: 1914–1919; 1941–1943
- Country: United Kingdom
- Branch: British Army
- Type: Infantry formation
- Size: Brigade
- Part of: 11th (Northern) Division; London District
- Engagements: First World War

The 33rd Infantry Brigade was an infantry brigade of the British Army that saw active service in the First World War and home service during the Second World War.

== First World War ==
The 33rd Brigade was formed in the Great War in August 1914 as part of Kitchener's Army, initially made up of volunteer service battalions from a variety of different infantry regiments. For the duration of the war, the brigade was in the 11th (Northern) Division. Between February and September 1917 it was under the command of Brigadier-General Arthur Daly. From September 1917 to the end of the war it was commanded by Brigadier-General Frederick Spring. The brigade served in the Gallipoli Campaign, in Egypt and on the Western Front, and comprised the following units:

=== Order of battle ===
The brigade was composed as follows:

- 6th (Service) Battalion, Lincolnshire Regiment
- 6th (Service) Battalion, Border Regiment (disbanded 9 February 1918)
- 7th (Service) Battalion, South Staffordshire Regiment
- 9th (Service) Battalion, Sherwood Foresters
- 33rd Machine Gun Company, Machine Gun Corps (formed March 1916, moved into 11th Battalion, Machine Gun Corps 28 February 1918)
- 33rd Trench Mortar Battery (joined July 1917)

=== Actions ===
The brigade took part in the following actions:

Gallipoli campaign
1915

- Battle of Suvla
  - Landing at Suvla Bay, 6–15 August
  - Battle of Scimitar Hill, 21 August
  - Attack on 'W' Hills, 21 August
  - Evacuation of Suvla, night 19/20 December

Western Front
1916

- Battle of the Somme
  - Battle of Flers–Courcelette, 15–22 September
  - Battle of Thiepval Ridge, 26–28 September

1917

- Operations on the Aisne, 11–19 January
- Battle of Messines, 9–14 June
- Third Battle of Ypres
  - Battle of Langemarck, 16–18 August
  - Fighting around St Julien, 19, 22 & 27 August
  - Battle of Polygon Wood, 26 September–3 October
  - Battle of Broodseinde, 4 October
  - Battle of Poelcappelle, 9 October

1918

- Second Battle of Arras
  - Battle of the Scarpe, 30 August
  - Battle of the Drocourt-Quéant Line, 2–3 September
- Battles of the Hindenburg Line
  - Battle of the Canal du Nord, 27 September–1 October
  - Battle of Cambrai, 8–9 September
  - Pursuit to the Selle, 9–12 October
- The Final Advance in Picardy
  - Battle of the Sambre, 4 November
  - Passage of the Grande Honnelle, 5–7 November

== Second World War ==
The brigade was reformed on 24 October 1941 during the Second World War as 33rd Infantry Brigade. On 10 November 1942 it was redesignated the 33rd Independent Infantry Brigade (Guards), as an all-arms brigade group under the command of Brigadier J. Jefferson. It was part of London District. The brigade was intended for home defence in the event of a German invasion and never left the United Kingdom. It was disbanded on 6 October 1943.

=== Order of battle ===
The following units constituted the brigade:

- 6th Battalion, Coldstream Guards (from 30 October 1941 to 30 September 1943)
- 3rd Battalion, Irish Guards (from 30 October to 4 September 1943)
- 3rd Battalion, Welsh Guards (from 30 October 1941 to 4 February 1942)
- 11th Battalion, Worcestershire Regiment (from 5 to 31 December 1942; redesignated 1st Bn to replace battalion captured at the Fall of Tobruk)
- 1st Battalion, Worcestershire Regiment (from 1 January to 4 October 1943)
- 9th Battalion, Bedfordshire and Hertfordshire Regiment (from 1 January to 4 October 1943)
- 177th Field Regiment, Royal Artillery (from 10 November 1942 to 4 October 1943)
- 220th Anti-Tank Battery, Royal Artillery (from 10 November 1942 to 30 September 1943)
- 80th Light Anti-Aircraft Battery, Royal Artillery (from 7 December 1942 to 12 September 1943)
- 26th Field Company, Royal Engineers (from 10 November 1942 to 27 September 1943)
- 24th Independent Reconnaissance Squadron, Reconnaissance Corps (from 10 November 1942 to 9 February 1943)
- 33rd Independent Bde Gp (Gds) Company, Royal Army Service Corps:
  - 339 Company RASC (from 10 November 1942 to 24 April 1943)
  - 538 Company RASC (from 12 June to 4 October 1943)
- 33rd Independent Bde Gp (Gds) Workshop, Royal Electrical and Mechanical Engineers (from 25 January to 30 September 1943)
- 33rd Independent Bde Gp (Gds) Provost Section Corps of Military Police (from 7 December 1942 to 4 October 1943)
