= Frederick William Spring =

- Born: 16 October 1841; Bombay, India
- Died: 12 January 1916 (aged 74); Sussex, England, United Kingdom
- Spouse: Ellen Harriett Inglis
- Relatives: Frederick Gordon Spring (son)
- Military career
- Allegiance: United Kingdom
- Branch: Bombay Army, East India Company (United Kingdom of Great Britain and Ireland) British Army
- Service years: 1858–1894
- Rank: Colonel
- Service number: 502
- Units: Bombay Artillery; Royal Artillery
- Conflicts: British Expedition to Abyssinia; Third Anglo-Burmese War
- Awards: Companion of the Order of the Bath

Colonel Frederick William Mackenzie Spring, CB (16 October 1841 – 12 January 1916) was a British Indian Army officer and military historian.

== Military career ==
Spring was born in Bombay, India on 16 October 1841, the son of Frederick James Spring and Jane Balfour Mackenzie. He was commissioned into the Bombay Artillery in 1865, which later amalgamated with the Royal Regiment of Artillery. He served in the British Expedition to Abyssinia from 1867 to 1868. In 1870, he was promoted to second captain, and two years later was elevated to the rank of full captain. He became a major in 1878. On 18 June 1884, he was promoted to lieutenant-colonel. He saw service in the Third Anglo-Burmese War and was Inspector General of Ordnance in Bombay between 1886 and 1893. Spring was promoted to colonel on 18 June 1888. After leaving service in 1894, Spring was invested as a Companion of the Order of the Bath. He wrote a book regarding the officers of the Bengal Army and the Royal Artillery, and contributed to several other military history publications. In retirement he lived in Midhurst, West Sussex.

== Family ==
In 1877, Spring married Ellen Harriett, daughter of Surgeon-General James Gordon Inglis. Their son, Frederick, became a brigadier-general and served in the First World War.

== Publications ==
- Spring, Frederick William Mackenzie (1902). The Bombay Artillery List of Officers Who Have Served in the Regiment of Bombay Artillery from its Formation in 1749 to Amalgamation with the Royal Artillery (PDF). London: William Clowes & Sons, Limited.
