= Helperby =

Village and former civil parish in North Yorkshire, England

Coordinates: 54°07′23″N 1°19′46″W

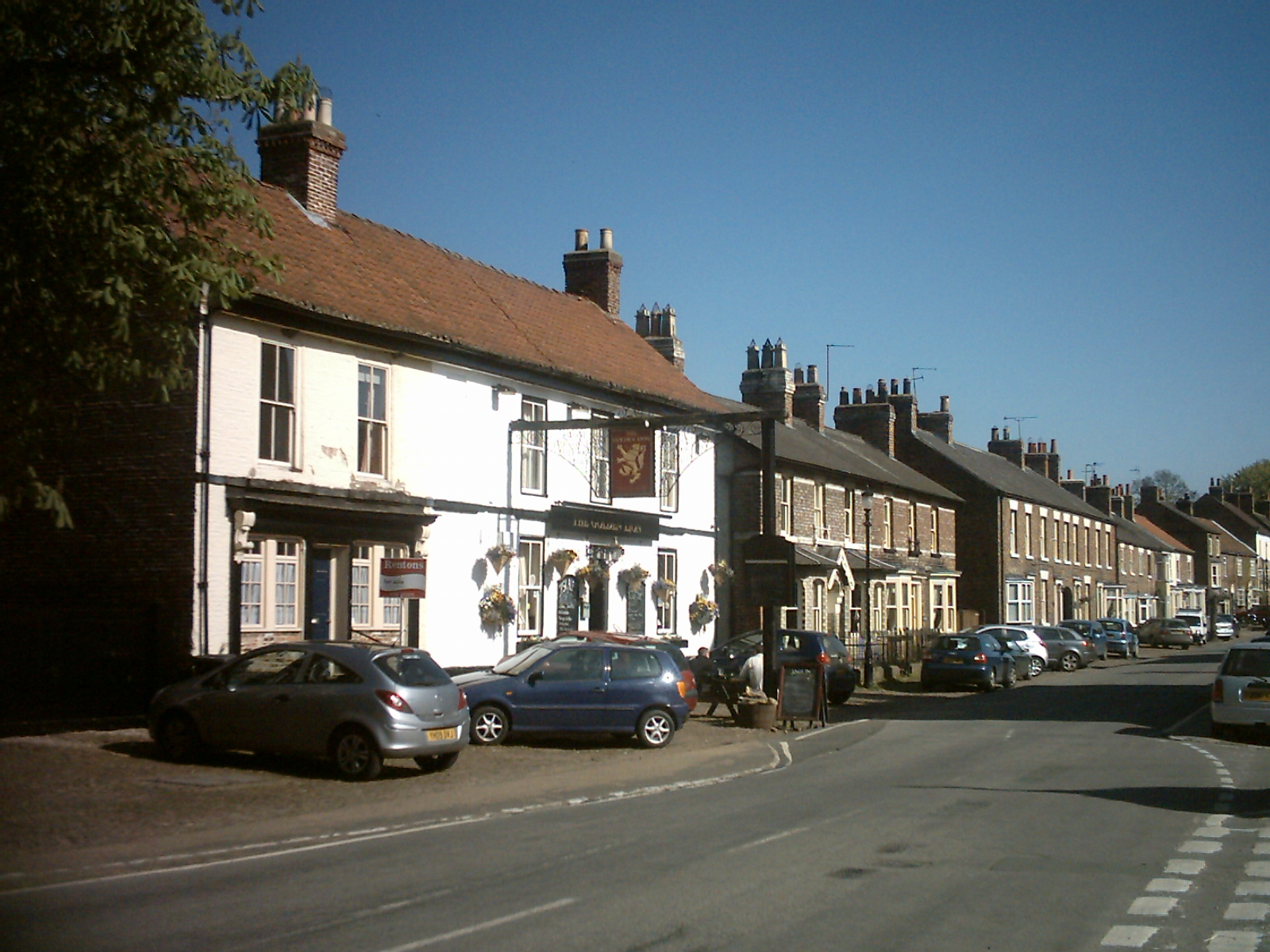
- Golden Lion on Main Street

- Location within North Yorkshire
- Population: 520 (2011 census)
- OS grid reference: SE439698
- Civil parish: Brafferton and Helperby
- Unitary authority: North Yorkshire
- Ceremonial county: North Yorkshire
- Region: Yorkshire and the Humber
- Country: England
- Sovereign state: United Kingdom
- Post town: YORK
- Postcode district: YO61
- Dialling code: 01423
- Police: North Yorkshire
- Fire: North Yorkshire
- Ambulance: Yorkshire
- UK Parliament: Thirsk and Malton

Helperby is a village and former civil parish, now in the parish of Brafferton and Helperby, in North Yorkshire, England, about five miles west of Easingwold. Over the years it has joined onto Brafferton.

Helperby has the Millennium Village Hall, a butcher's shop, a doctor's surgery and a mobile bakery and post office (open only on specific days). There are two pubs, one a restaurant with rooms, one a village inn, and a disused Methodist Chapel which is now a house. In 2008 Helperby had a new pavilion at the football and cricket pitch. There is also a war memorial, in memory of war soldiers in World War One

There is also an annual beer festival held in September to raise funds for future development of the play area near to the Cricket Club.

As of March 2025, the Golden Lion Inn, located in Helperby, is looking for people to fund the re-opening of the pub, by turning it into a community asset. The pub originally closed in September 2024 following the death of the landlord. This initiative is being led by a small community group, overseen by the Brafferton and Helperby Parish Council. The community group will have 6 months to source funds to buy the pub, before it will be re-listed to external buyers.

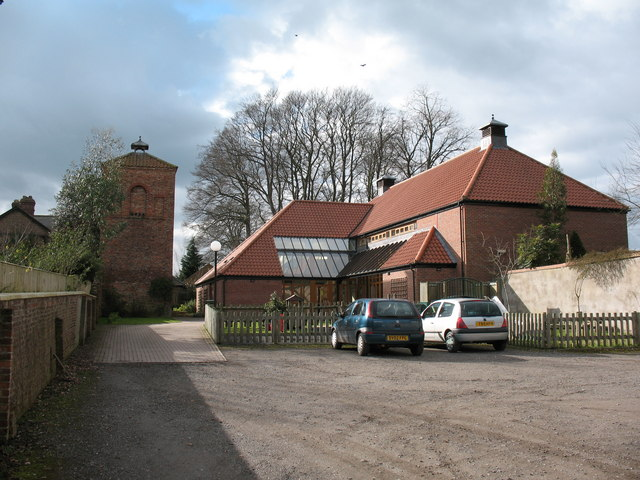
Helperby's Millennium Hall

The film The Life and Crimes of William Palmer was filmed in the village in 1998.

There is now a Children's play area, located outside the Millennium Village Hall, next to the post office.

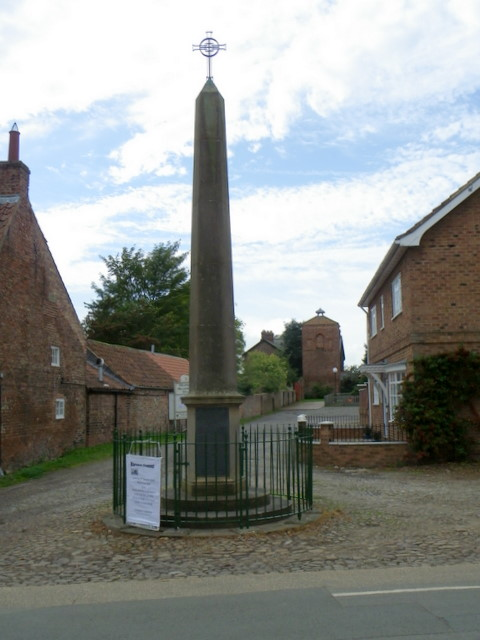
Helperby's War Memorial

In 2022 a Wedding Event venue was opened, located in the gardens of Helperby Hall.

== Governance ==
An electoral ward in the same name exists. This ward had a total population of 1,922 at the Census 2011.

Helperby was formerly a township in the parish of Brafferton, in 1866 Helperby became a separate civil parish, on 1 April 2019 the parish was merged with Brafferton to form "Brafferton and Helperby".

Until 1974 it was in the North Riding of Yorkshire. From 1974 to 2023 it was part of the Hambleton District, it is now administered by the unitary North Yorkshire Council.

The Brafferton and Helperby Parish Council oversees the local governance of the area. As of April 2025, they meet once a month to discuss local matters.

== See also ==
- Listed buildings in Brafferton and Helperby
