= Goodwill's Girls' School, Bengaluru =

Goodwill's Girls School, Bangalore
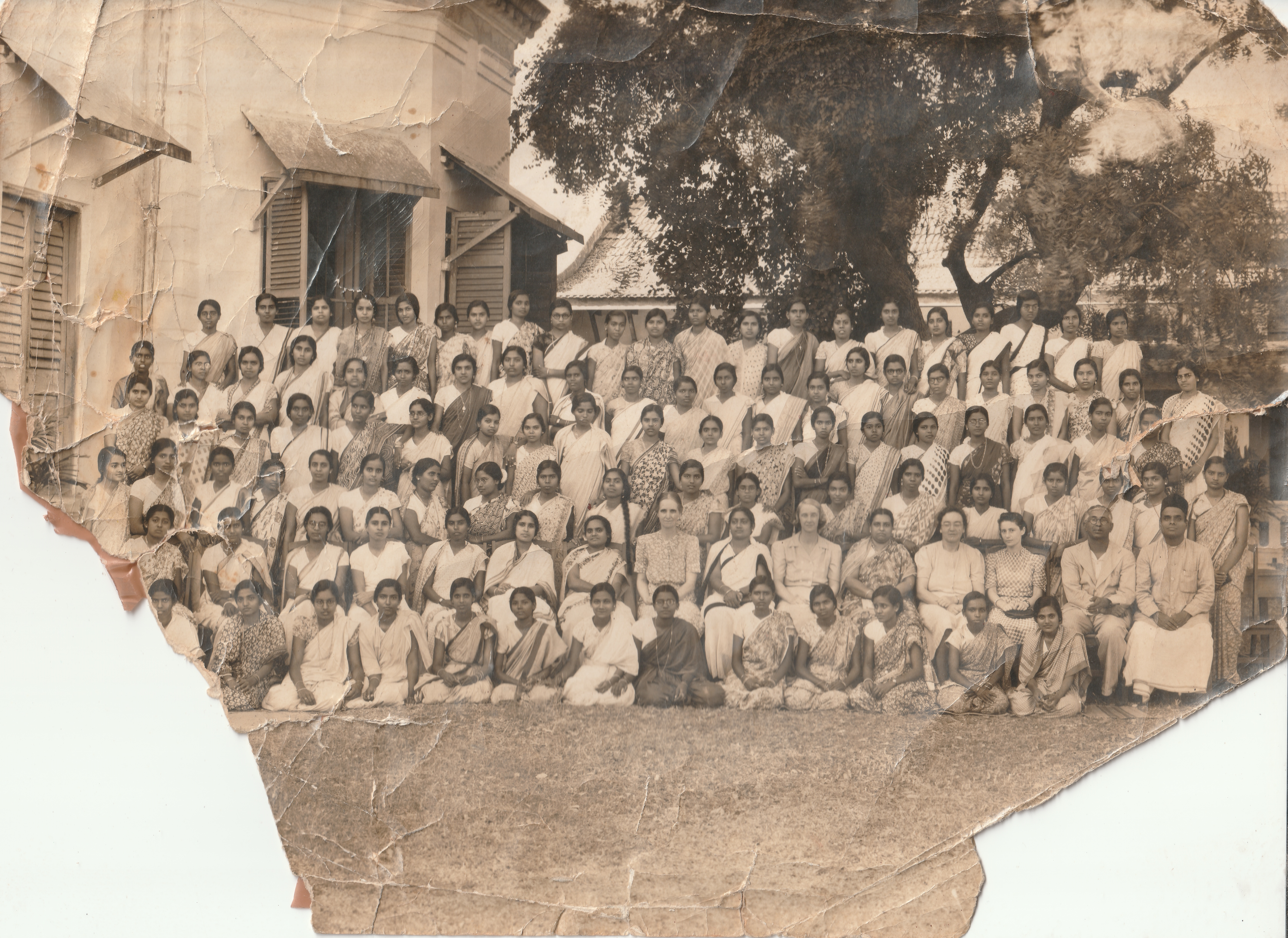
- Class Photograph, Circa 1919 - Grade VIII

Location
- Promenade Road, Fraser Town; Bangalore, Karnataka; India; 12.995885°N 77.609129°E

Information
- Former name: Wesleyan Tamil School
- Type: Government Aided, Private School
- Motto: (Eḻuka Kaṟka Paṇiceya niṟka) (Arise Learn Serve)
- Established: 2 September 1855
- Founder: Mrs. Little, Wesleyan Tamil Mission
- Principal: Mrs. Gnanamoni Franklin
- Campus size: 14 acres (57,000 m^{2})
- Colors: Green and White
- Affiliation: Karnataka State Secondary Education Examination Board
- Former Name: Wesleyan Tamil Girls School
- Renamed After: Rev. Fred Goodwill
- Management: Church of South India
- Diocese: Karnataka Central Diocese
- Website: http://goodwillchristiancollege.com/

Goodwill's Girls School is located at Promenade Road, Fraser Town, Bangalore Cantonment. Formerly known as the Wesleyan Tamil School, the school was renamed after Rev. Fred Goodwill, a British Missionary and Tamil scholar, who served as the manager of the school, in his capacity as superintendent of the Wesleyan Tamil Mission, Bangalore and Kolar Gold Fields.

== History ==
The Wesleyan Tamil Mission was established in Bangalore by Rev. Elijah Hoole and James Mowatt in April 1821, with the land for the present school premises acquired in November 1821 (p. 82-83). In November 18231, Elijah Hoole of the Wesleyan Mission applied to the Government of Madras for granting permission for starting a school and preaching place for the native population in the Bangalore Cantonment. The land selected had been previously obtained for the same purpose by a member of the Wesleyan Society who had lived temporarily in the Bangalore Cantonment, and had built a mud building with a thatched roof, which was in ruins in 1821. The permission was granted and a small building measuring 30 ft. length and 13 ft. width was constructed under the supervision of Mr. Mowat. The present premises of the school in the Bangalore Cantonment has been owned by the Wesleyan Mission since then. In the same campus, Wesleyan Mission Press was established in 1840.

In 1854, Sir. Charles Wood, president of the Board of Control, East India Company, sent out his famous Wood's Despatch to Lord Dalhousie, the then Governor-General of India, which called for major revamp in the educational system in British India, encouraging mass education for all castes (for the first time in the history of India), establishing government schools in each district, government aid to private schools, appointment of teachers and school inspectors, establishing universities at the major cities of Delhi, Bombay, Madras and Calcutta, amongst many other reforms. The Wesleyan Mission School was established in 1855, using a generous grant from the Government of Madras.

Elijah Hoole in his book Personal Narrative of a Mission to the South of India, from 1820 to 1828 acknowledges the help rendered by the British Resident in Mysore, Arthur Henry Cole, in getting the support of the Maharaja of Mysore (p. 73, 74, 84, 85, 86, 207). It could be possible that the park adjacent to the Wesleyan Tamil Mission could have been named after Cole, to acknowledge this support to the Mission as Coles Park. If that's the case, then Cole's Park has been known by that name for nearly 200 years.

The Wesleyan Mission School was established in 1855, with the main objective of educating children of native Tamil sepoys of the Madras Presidency Army, who were stationed at the Bangalore Civil and Military Station. The school was initially established on East Parade (present Manipal Centre on Dickenson Road), next to the Wesleyan Church (now CSI East Parade Church), with Ms. Little as the head mistress, with only a handful of students. The school was providing education in the native languages, along with skills such as knitting and sewing. The Wesleyan Tamil Girls School was moved to present site on Promenade Road, at the Wesley Tamil Mission compound, in 1888. By the beginning of World War I, the Wesleyan Tamil Girls School was the first all girls school in the Bangalore Civil and Military Station.

== Mrs. Little's Native Girls' School ==
The school began on 2 September 1855, with 42 students of whom 11 were Christian, 16 non-Christian and the rest Roman Catholics. The school was started by Mrs. Little, a missionary's wife. Mrs. Little arrived in the Bangalore Civil and Military Station in 1854. Seeing the social status of women in Indian society, Mrs. Little was moved and wanted to start a school to educate Indian girl children. Her fiends in Islington, England, helped her in this cause, by sending gifts, which were sold in Bangalore, helping to raise funds to run the school for nearly 8 months. Many girl children were very happy to get an education, with Mrs. Little noting that many hardly missed classes even for a day.

The school started at 9:00 am with an assembly. At 9:30 am, children joined the servants in saying Tamil prayers led by a catechist. Proper classes began at 10:00 am. The schedule of units taught were Tamil, followed by Scripture and History (in Tamil), then Conference Catechism and Geography (in Tamil). Finally, it was the English department with easy lessons, hymns and catechism. By 12:15, the children marched into the verandah, where the attendance was taken. Then the children sang the hymn 'There Is a Happy Land'. In conclusion, the students knelt down and said the Lord's Prayer in Tamil. After which, they were dismissed to go home for Lunch. The children came back at 2:00 pm for sewing and crochet classes. Some students who lived far away were unable to come back for the afternoon session.

Mrs. Little records holding of the half yearly exams of the Native Girls' School in Bangalore on 2 July 1856. The examination in Scriptures were from Mathew Chapter 3 and 25. The other subjects examined were Tamil Geography, Tamil spellings and translation from English to Tamil. The children sang many Tamil hymns, and a few English hymns such as 'Here we suffer in grief and pain', 'There Is a Happy Land' and 'Lift up the Gospel Banner' in the tune of 'Away to School' from the 'Training School Song Book'. The exams were a private exam, and Mrs. Little hoped to have a Public Exam for the finals. In 1857, EKG, writes about a native widow, Elizabeth being sent to Bangalore from Madras to work as a teacher in Mrs. Little's School.

== Mrs. Symone's Wesleyan Mission School, Ulsoor ==
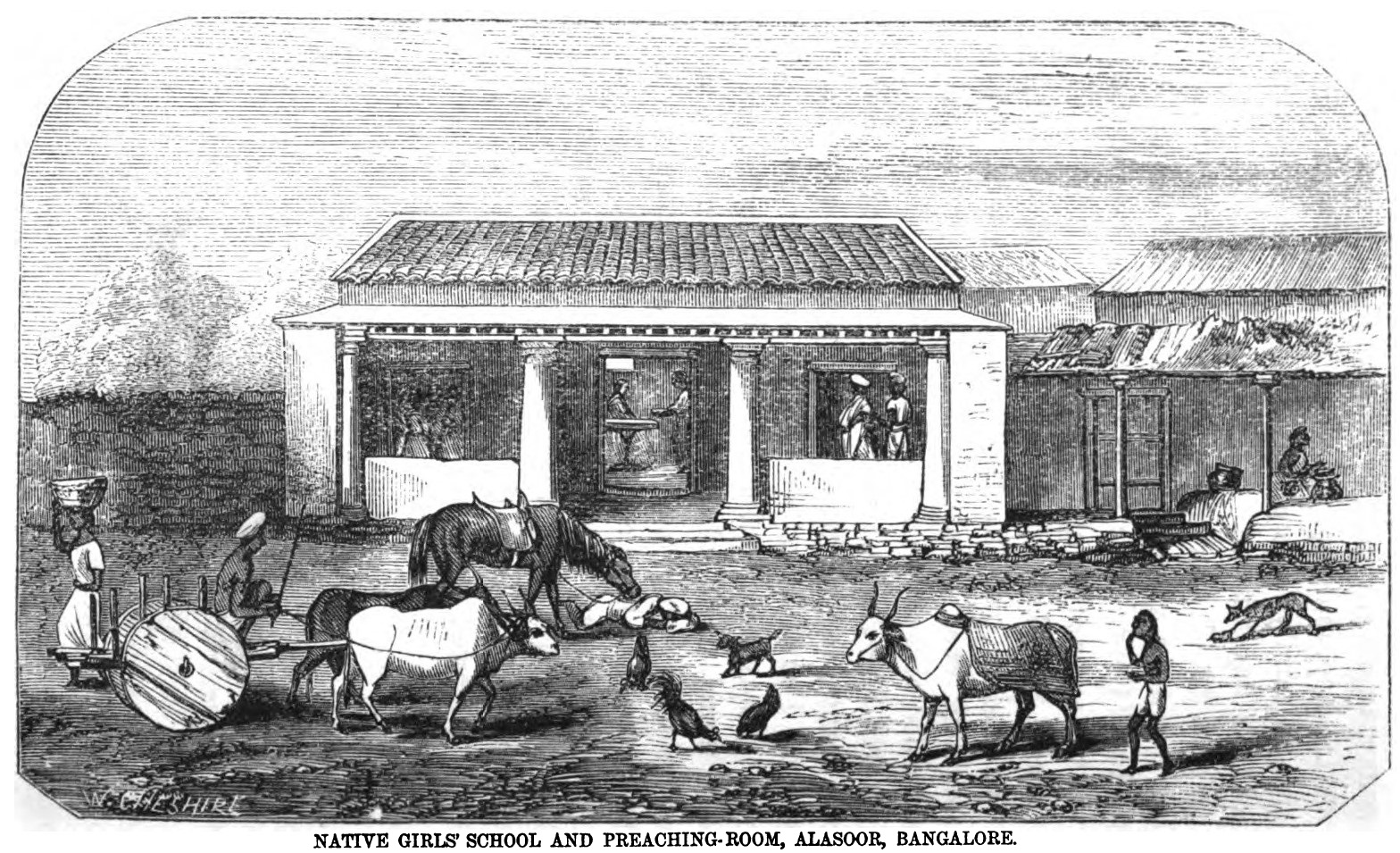
Native Girls' School and Preaching-Room, Alasoor, Bangalore (p.184, 1865)

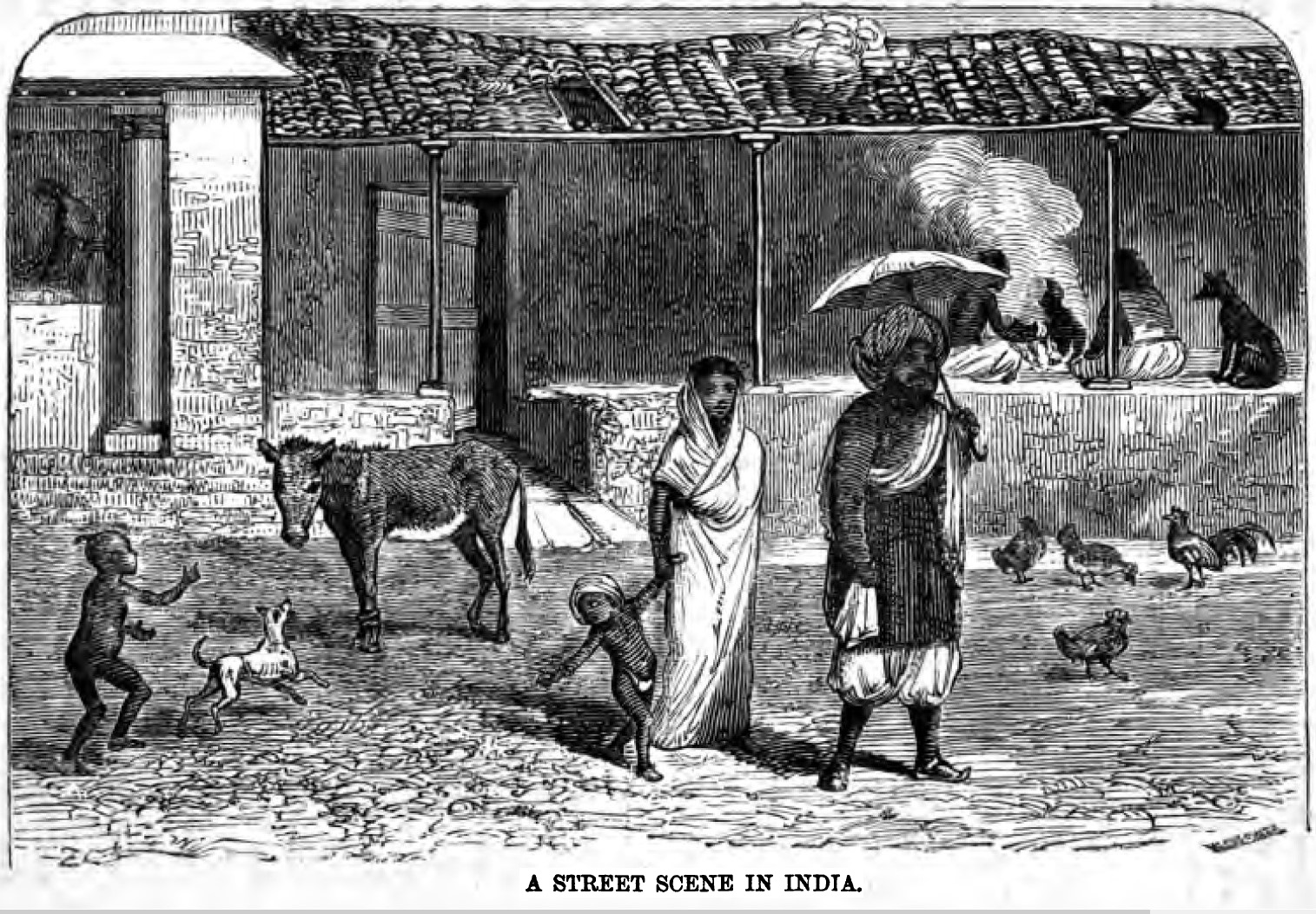
A Street Scene in India, Outside the Wesleyan Girls School, Bangalore (January 1869, p.7)

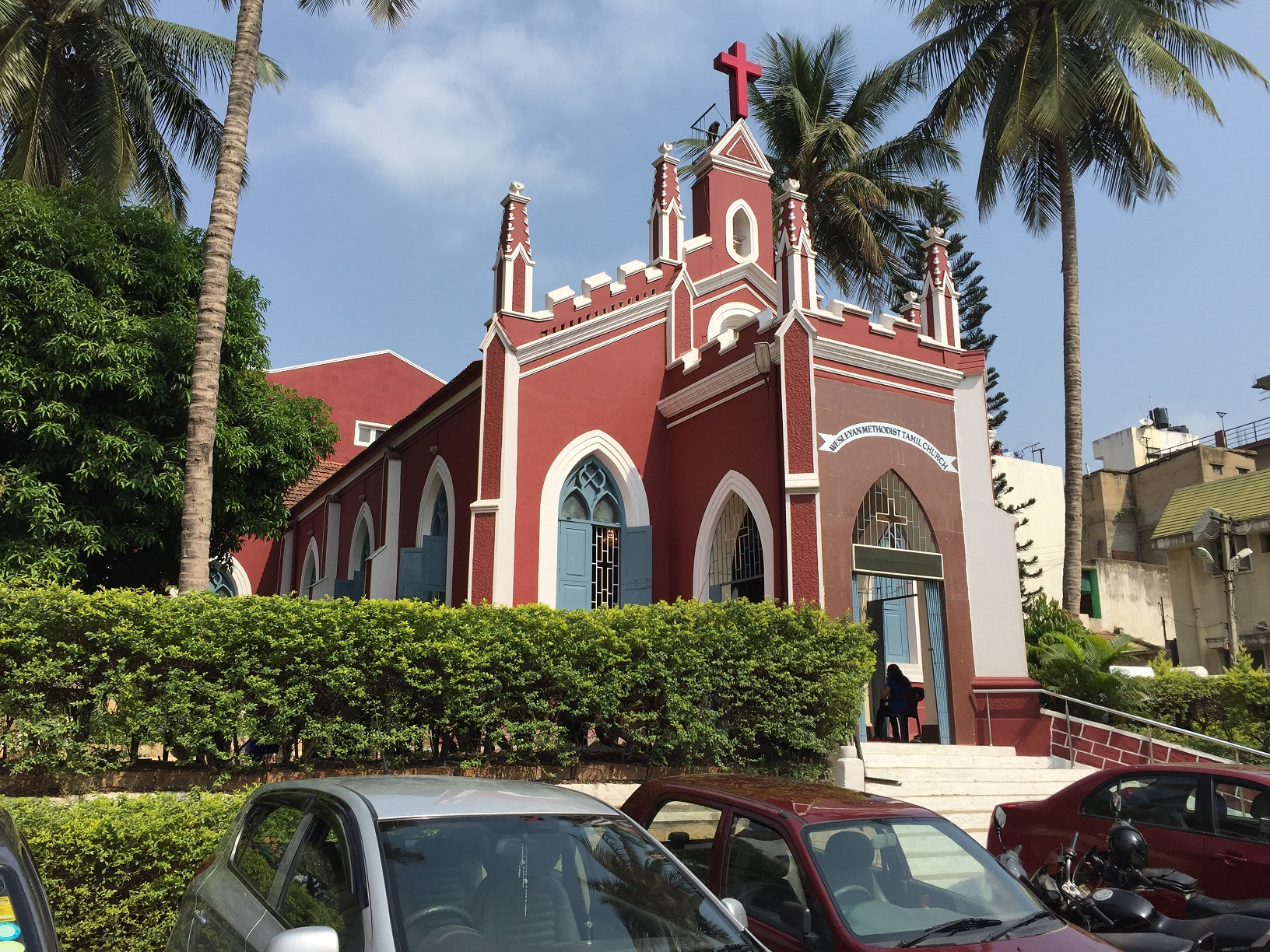
Wesley Tamil Church, Haines Road (2016)

Anne M Symone provides a description of the Wesleyan Mission Girls School in Ulsoor (Qyazi Alasoor, near the Someshwara Temple). The school was a native house with a little passage, leading to an open sky courtyard, and the house supported by pillars. A chart of the World Map in Tamil and letters of the Tamil alphabet were hung on the wall. The girls were first taught to master the letters of Tamil, which were 234 with different combinations. Sand was used to trace the letters of the alphabet. The girls were all brown, some being fairer than others, with black eyes and hair. They wore a small petticoat, and a ravaky (short body, just reaching short of the waist), with no hats or footwear. Jewelry worn were nose-studs, earrings, anklets, silver belts, gold necklaces. All instructions were given in Tamil. The teacher rode a pony from Shoolay to reach the school in Ulsoor. The schools were funded by donations from England.

The Wesleyan Mission Girls School in Ulsoor had 50–60 native girls, from families in the Ulsoor neighbourhood. The school building cost GBP 60, paid for by sale of articles sent to Mrs. Catherine Male (wife of Matthew Trevan Male) from supporters in Stockport, Richmond, Manchester, Acton, etc. (Catherine wife of Matthew Trevan Male of the Wesleyan Missionary Society who died on 29 August 1865 aged 49 and Fanny Lees child of Catherine and Matthew Male born 29 January 1861 and died 24 April 1861, are buried at the Agram Protestant Cemetery, Bangalore)

The school in Ulsoor was for the higher caste girls, who refused to study with the lower caste. Mrs. Symon further writes about the annual examination which was held on 22 December 1865, were the students were examined for basic maths, Tamil Poetry, Tamil grammar and Geography. The school had 71 students now, and they had learned sewing and produced 86 garments. At this instance, a letter written by one of the students (P Marneekummal) to Mrs. Symon was read out. Dolls, bags, boxes were distributed as prizes and children were given cakes and fruit.

The Ulsoor Wesleyan Mission School was closed in around 1954, and the school and staff were transferred to the Goodwills School at Promenade Road.

== Wesley Tamil Church, Haines Road ==
William Sproston Caine in his book 'Picturesque India: a Handbook for European Travellers', published in 1890, describes the Wesleyan Tamil School on Promenade Road, Cleveland Town, St. John's Hill as being headed by a missionary. The missionary's house is recorded to being just next to the boarding school. The missionary was being assisted by a native preacher, zenana visitors, catechists, and bible women. The principal chapel of the mission is described as being at Haines Road, and another Wesleyan chapel being constructed at Shoolay (Wesley Tamil Church, Commisionarant Road). The other Wesleyan Tamil schools in the Bangalore Civil and Military Station were English boys middle school in the Cantonment bazaar (Methodist Mission High School, Dharmaraja Kovil St.), Anglo-Vernacular schools in Shoolay and Mootocherry, five Tamil schools, and five day-schools for girls (pp. 522–523).

== Fred Goodwill ==
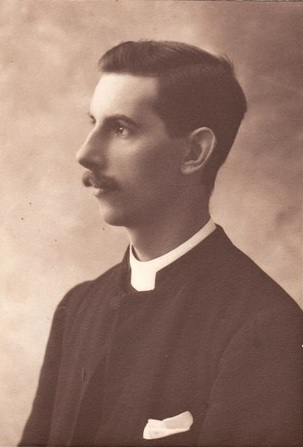
Fred Goodwill (1874-1969))

Documentation of the life of Rev. Fred Goodwill was done after extensive research by his grand daughter Jane Smith. Fred was born on 20 February 1874, to Elizabeth and Thomas Goodwill, Yorkshire, UK. Fred arrived in India in 1899, posted as the superintendent of the Wesleyan Tamil Mission, Bangalore and Kolar Gold Fields. Fred was a scholar of the Tamil Language, and was also fluent in Canarese (Kannada) and Telagu (Telugu). Fred is acknowledged as an authority on Tamil Shaiva Literature, with authors quoting from his research. As one of the founding members of the Mythic Society, his published papers on the history of the Mysore State form the basis of history of the State, as we know it now. Fred was a keen photographer, who documented life in the British Bangalore Cantonment, in the early 1900s. His photos published as Tuck's Postcards, provide a valuable documentation of the history of the Bangalore Civil and Military Station. His 26 years service to the Wesleyan Mission saw his campaign strongly for the cause of women's education beyond class and caste.

In his 26 years in India, Rev. Fred Goodwill contributed immensely to the education and progress of Tamil literature in Bangalore Cantonment. His name is associated with books on Tamil Literature published around that period in British India, and Fred Goodwill authored many academic articles on Tamil Literature, which were published in Journals. Fred's articles on Tamil literature are mainly on the Shaivism philosophy, Tiruvacakam, the poetry of the Shavite Saints Tirunavukkarasar, Manikkavacakar, Sundarar and Sambandar. Research done by Fred Goodwill is quoted by works of later authors of Dravidian culture, Shaiva Siddhanta and Ancient Tamil literature, along with that of George Uglow Pope. About the Tamil poetry and literature on Saiva Siddhanta he remarked "'Those who have studied the system unanimously agree that this eulogy is not a whit too enthusiastic or free worded. That the system is eclectic is at once apparent".

== Fred and the Wesleyan Mission School ==
In British India, education of the girl child was considered a taboo by Hindus as well as Indian Christians. The Wesleyan Tamil Girls School, Bangalore was established in 1851. Around fifty years later, Fred Goodwill built on its foundations and improved the school to a great extent. In 1906, Fred Goodwill began to assist the principal of the school Ms. Sisterson, eventually becoming its manager. His wife, Alice also got actively involved in educating the children and took time to teach needlework and crafts. Fred Goodwill was keen to stress to importance of education of girls irrespective of any caste barriers in the Bangalore Cantonment. He once wrote in "preparing girls for future work we remember that we are preparing workers to hasten the time when foreign missionaries will be a thing of the past". In respect for his work at the Wesleyan Girls Tamil School was renamed as Goodwills Girls School.

== Present Status ==
The school is trying to stay relevant to the cause of providing education to girls. It has now been upgraded to junior college and degree college in its compound. There are nearly 1200 girl children studying in the school. The school's original stone structure (built in 1888) still stands and is a prominent landmark of the Cantonment. An auditorium and a chapel has been added to the school, and also a library named after Ms. Little. The school once imparted education in Tamil, Telugu and Urdu. However, it now offers only English Medium Education.

== Goodwill Stalwarts ==
- Ms. Little
- Rev. Fred Goodwill
- Ms. Rose Sisterson (1905–1938)
- Ms. Roper
- Ms. Rogerson
- Ms. P Krishnappa
- Miss. Azelia Adiappa
- Ms. Jothi Parker
- Mrs. Phillips
- Ms. Samson
- Ms. Ranthanjili Nicodemus
- Mrs. Jamila Paul
- Mrs. Vani Mohan
- Mrs. Evangaline Milton
- Mrs. Gnanamoni Franklin

== Rose Sisterson ==
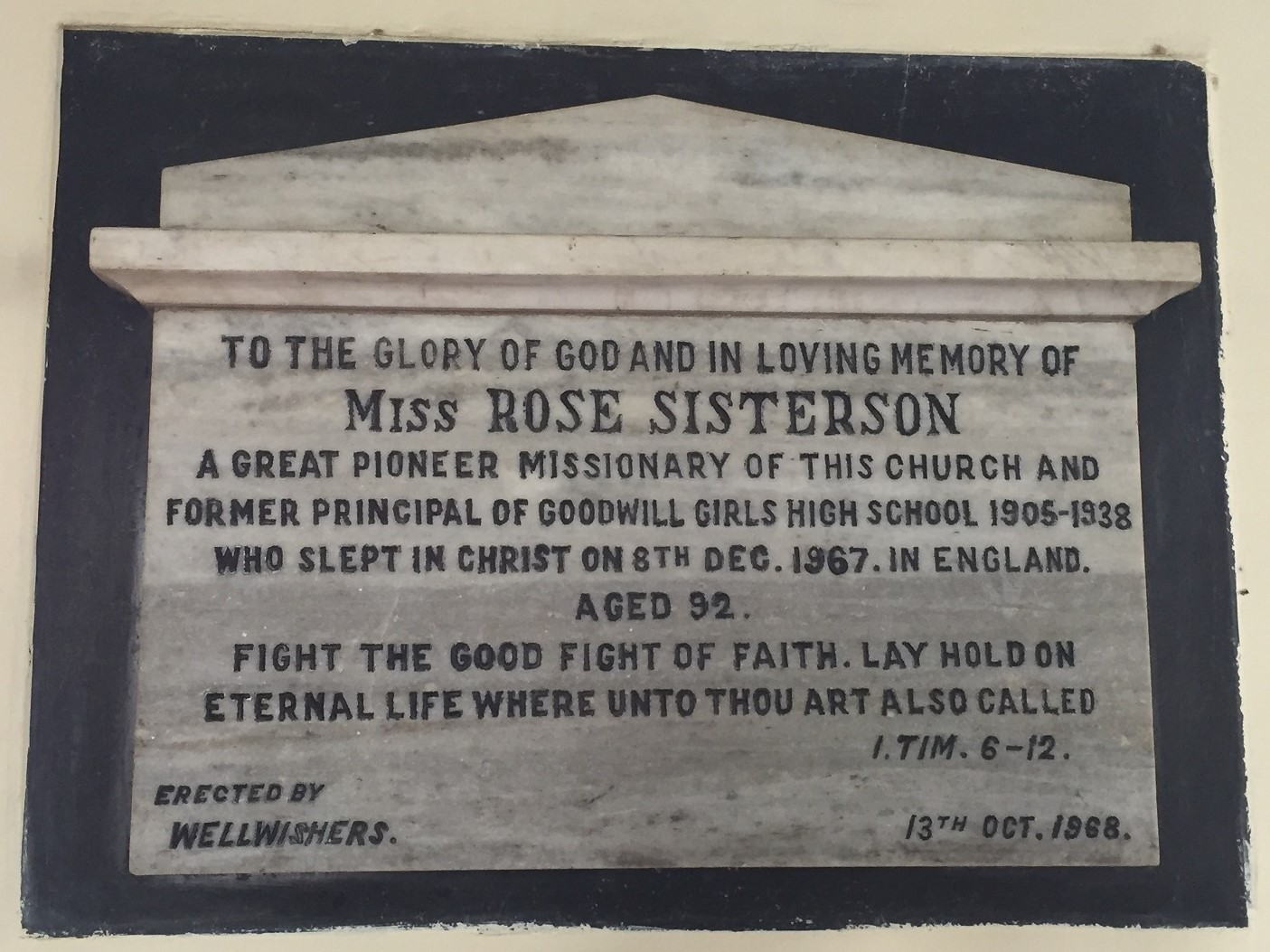
Rose Sisterson Memorial, Wesley Tamil Church, Haines Road, Bangalore

There exists a memorial plaque at the Wesley Tamil Church, Haines Road, Bangalore

TO THE GLORY OF GOD AND IN LOVING MEMORY OF
MISS ROSE SISTERSON
A GREAT PIONEER MISSIONARY OF THIS CHURCH AND
FORMER PRINCIPAL OF GOODWILL GIRLS HIGH SCHOOL 1905-1938
WHO SLEPT IN CHRIST ON 8TH DEC. 1967. IN ENGLAND.
AGED 92
FIGHT THE GOOD FIGHT OF FAITH. LAY HOLD ON
ETERNAL LIFE WHERE THOU ART ALSO CALLED
1. TIM. 6-12
ERECTED BY WELLWISHERS 13TH OCT. 1968

== Notable alumni ==
- Evangeline Anderson Rajkumar, theologian

== Photos ==
There are hundreds of photos of the Goodwill's Girls School, dating to the early 20th century, in the Fred Goodwill collection.
