= Helperby Hall =

Historic building in North Yorkshire, England

Coordinates: 54.1219°N 1.3284°W

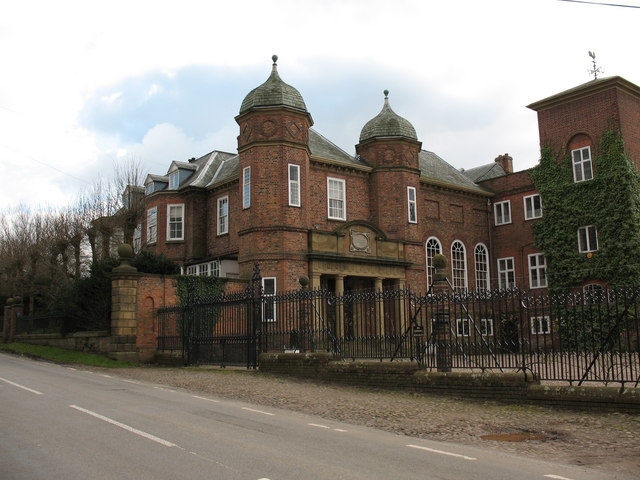
The building, in 2007

Helperby Hall is a historic building in Brafferton and Helperby, a village in North Yorkshire, in England.

The manor house was originally built in 1709, and since 1816 it has been the home of the Milnes Coates family. In 1889, it was extensively altered, including changes to the facade, and a rear extension. A northern range was added in 1914, followed in 1923 by an entrance range, with prominent turrets. The building was Grade II listed in 1952.

The building is constructed of reddish-brown brick with a floor band, a modillion eaves cornice, and a hipped green slate roof. There are two storeys and a U-shaped plan, with six bays. Steps lead to a doorway with Ionic columns, a frieze and a dentilled cornice. There are two full-height canted bay windows and pedimented dormers, and the other windows are sashes in architraves. The entrance wing has a Doric portico with a frieze and a segmental pediment, and it is flanked by turrets with onion domes. To the right is a square tower with a cupola. Along the street are wrought iron railings, and to the north is a curving coped brick wall. Inside, the rear staircase is made of oak and is probably 18th century. In front of the building is a short wall with iron railings and stone piers, while there is a curved brick wall to the north of the property's courtyard.

The garden was noted for its mature yew trees in 1923. In 2021, it was replanted and is marketed as Helperby Walled Garden, for use as a wedding venue.

== See also ==
- Listed buildings in Brafferton and Helperby
