= Leslie Creery Miller =

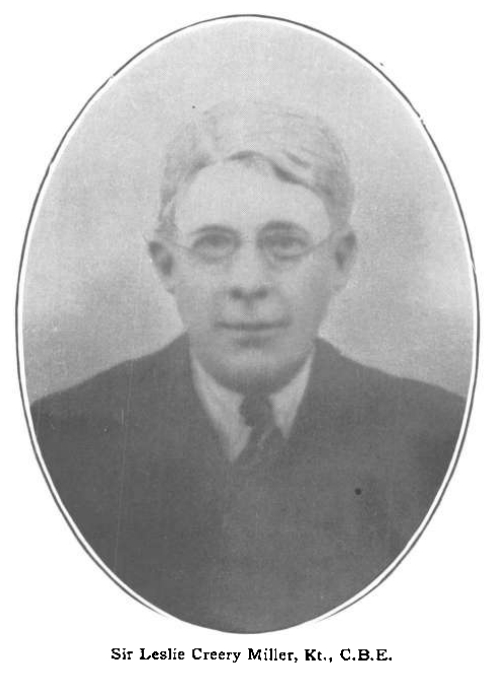

Sir Leslie Creery Miller, CBE (1862 – 11 February 1925) was a British Indian civil servant who served in the Madras Presidency and also in the court of Mysore. He is best known for the Miller Committee Report of 1919 which ensured representation for non-Brahmins in government positions.

Miller was born to Sir Alexander Edward Miller (died 1903) and Elizabeth Furley Creery (1837-1911). He was educated at Charterhouse and Trinity College, Dublin before joining the Indian Civil Service in 1883. He married Margaret Julia (later OBE, died 3 June 1938), daughter of Robert Lowry in 1886. He was posted in various parts of the Madras Presidency before becoming Sessions Judge 1900–1907, Puisne Judge 1907–1914. He was knighted in 1914 shortly after his retirement, although he continued to hold non-official and advisory positions.

The non-Brahmin movement in Mysore led by Vokkaliga and Lingayat leaders approached the Maharaja of Mysore who appointed a committee in 1918 under Justice Miller "to consider steps necessary for the adequate representation of communities in public service". The committee recommended that where qualified applicants were available, up to two-thirds of lower appointments and half of higher appointments should be reserved for non-Brahmins with recruitment spread out over a period of at the most seven years. This was accepted by the Maharaja and led to the resignation of the opposing Dewan M. Visvesvaraya.

Miller presided over the Mythic Society in Bangalore to which his wife gifted a stone Nandi bull in 1919. After his retirement he settled at Glen Morgan in the Nilgiris. He died at Delhi after suffering from "influenzal-broncho-pneumonia". He was buried at the cemetery in Qudsia Gardens with members of the Madras Civil Service in attendance.
