= Listed buildings in Brafferton and Helperby =

Brafferton and Helperby is a civil parish in the county of North Yorkshire, England. It contains 34 listed buildings that are recorded in the National Heritage List for England. Of these, one is listed at Grade II*, the middle of the three grades, and the others are at Grade II, the lowest grade. The parish contains the adjacent villages of Brafferton and Helperby, and the surrounding countryside. Most of the listed buildings are houses, cottages and associated structures, farmhouses and farm buildings, and the others include a church, public houses, three dovecotes, a bridge and a well.

== Key ==
Grade	Criteria
II*	Particularly important buildings of more than special interest
II	Buildings of national importance and special interest

== Buildings ==
Name and location	Photograph	Date	Notes	Grade
St Peter's Church; 54.12535°N 1.33374°W		15th century	The earliest part of the church is the west tower, the chapels were added in the early 16th century, the nave was rebuilt between 1826 and 1831 by J. P. Pritchett, and the vestry was added in 1893. The church is built in sandstone, and the chancel has a slate roof. It consists of a nave wider than it is long, a chancel flanked by chapels, a northeast vestry, and a west tower. The tower has three stages, stepped angle buttresses, a south doorway, a three-light west window, two-light bell openings, a south clock face, and an embattled parapet. The nave, chancel and chapels also have embattled parapets.	II*
Dunroyal House; 54.12283°N 1.33100°W	—	Late 16th century (probable)	The house has a timber-framed core, and is encased in brick apart from the upper floor at the front. It has a swept pantile roof with stone coping on the right. There are two storeys and four bays, and a projection at the rear. The windows are sashes, and at the rear is a large wagon door.	II
Oak House; 54.12406°N 1.33063°W		Late 16th to early 17th century	A farmhouse and cottage, later combined, the house is timber framed with the outer bays rendered, and the south gable end and rear extensions in brick. There are two storeys and five bays, and a rear outshut. The house has a plinth, close studded timber framing, and a pantile roof. The doorway has an elliptical hood, and the windows are horizontally-sliding sashes. The interior also has exposed timber framing.	II
Fountain House; 54.12302°N 1.33003°W		Early 17th century (probable)	A pair of cottages with a timber-framed core, encased in brick and rendered, apart from the west gable end, and a with a swept pantile roof. On the right part of the upper floor is mock applied timber framing. There are two storeys and three bays, and the windows are horizontally-sliding sashes.	II
Former Half Moon Inn; 54.12233°N 1.32876°W		17th century (probable)	The former public house is in whitewashed brick, and has a swept pantile roof with raised rendered verges to the north gable. There are two storeys and three bays. The doorway has a hood, to its right is a bow window with a modillion cornice, and the other windows are horizontally-sliding sashes, the window in the ground floor with a segmental head.	II
Helperby Hall, railings and wall 54.12189°N 1.32827°W		1709	A manor house that was altered and extended in the late 19th century, and the entrance wing was added in 1923. It is in reddish-brown brick with a floor band, a modillion eaves cornice, and a hipped green slate roof. There are two storeys and a U-shaped plan, with six bays. Steps lead to a doorway with Ionic columns, a frieze and a dentilled cornice. There are two full-height canted bay windows and pedimented dormers, and the other windows are sashes in architraves. The entrance wing has a Doric portico with a frieze and a segmental pediment, and it is flanked by turrets with onion domes. To the right is a square tower with a cupola. Along the street are wrought iron railings, and to the north is a curving coped brick wall.	II
Walls, Brafferton Hall; 54.12537°N 1.33329°W	—	Early to mid 18th century (probable)	The walls to the east, west and south of the hall are in reddish-brown brick with stepped and cogged coping, and at intervals there are buttresses. At the entrance to St Peter's Church is a segmental-arched doorway with brick pedestals and stone ball finials, and the wall is ramped up to the doorway.	II
The Oak Tree Public House; 54.12522°N 1.32961°W		Early to mid 18th century	The public house, which has been extended to the left, is in pale reddish-brown brick, with a floor band, stepped and dentilled eaves, and a Roman tile roof. The original part has two storeys and two bays. The central doorway has engaged reeded columns, panelled reveals and a soffit, a fanlight, a frieze and a small flat hood. The windows are horizontally-sliding sashes, those in the ground floor with segmental heads.	II
1 Drury Lane, Helperby; 54.12338°N 1.32901°W	—	Mid 18th century	A cottage in reddish-brown brick with a floor band, dentilled eaves and a swept pantile roof. There are two storeys and three bays. In the centre is a wooden porch, and the windows are sashes in architraves.	II
Golden Lion Public House and Old Fountain Stores; 54.12322°N 1.32961°W		18th century	A public house and a former shop in whitewashed brick on a plinth, with a floor band, a wooden eaves cornice and a pantile roof. There are two storeys, the former shop has two bays and the public house has three. On the former shop is a shopfront with pilasters, acanthus brackets and a cornice. The public house has a central doorway with an oblong fanlight in an architrave, and the windows are sashes.	II
Wall, Grove House Farmhouse; 54.12227°N 1.33127°W	—	18th century	The wall to the east of the farmhouse is in red brick, with square stone coping, on a sandstone base of varying heights. It contains a doorway with a four-centred arched head and a keystone.	II
Hall View Cottages; 54.12249°N 1.32856°W	—	18th century (probable)	A pair of cottages in reddish- and pinkish-brown brick on a plinth, with stepped and dentilled eaves, and a pantile roof with a raised verge on the left. There are two storeys, and each cottage has one bay. The left doorway has a segmental head, and the right doorway has a round head, above which is a blocked opening. The windows are sashes with segmental heads in flush architraves.	II
2 Main Street, Helperby; 54.12437°N 1.33138°W	—	Mid to late 18th century	The house, at one time a shop, is in reddish-brown brick, rendered at the front, on a plinth, with a floor band, dentilled eaves at the rear, and a Welsh slate roof. There are two storeys and three bays. The central doorway has a bracketed hood, above it is a round-arched panel with lettering, and the windows are sashes.	II
Estate Office, Groom's Cottage and Anthony's Cottage; 54.12225°N 1.32828°W	—	Mid to late 18th century	The estate office and cottages are in reddish-brown brick on a partly rendered plinth, with a floor band, stepped and dentilled eaves, and a Lakeland slate roof with stone coping and kneelers. There are two storeys and four bays. In the left bay is a canted bay window, to the right is a doorway with an architrave and an oblong fanlight, and further to the right is a doorway with reeded pilasters, a decorated radial fanlight, and an open dentilled pediment. To the right of this doorway is a casement window, and the other windows are sashes. In the right gable end is a doorway with a hood.	II
Laurel Farmhouse; 54.12608°N 1.33402°W	—	Mid to late 18th century	The farmhouse is in pale brown brick, with quoins, dentilled eaves, and a pantile roof with stone copings. There are three storeys and three bays. The central doorway has a pediment, and the windows are sashes with stucco lintels, keystones and sills.	II
Kirkholme; 54.12390°N 1.33095°W	—	Mid to late 18th century	A cottage in reddish-brown brick, with a floor band, stepped and dentilled eaves, and a swept pantile roof. There are two storeys and three bays. The central doorway has pilasters and a flat hood on brackets, and above it is a blind panel. The outer bays contain sash windows with plain surrounds.	II
Lodge Farmhouse; 54.12196°N 1.32791°W		Mid to late 18th century	The house is in pale brown brick, with a stucco floor band, a dentilled and modillion eaves cornice, and a pantile roof with stone copings and kneelers. There are three storeys and five bays. Steps lead up to a central doorway with engaged Tuscan columns, a frieze with triglyphs, metopes and paterae, an oblong fanlight, and a dentilled pediment with stucco decoration, above which is an oriel window. The other windows are sashes in architraves with gauged red brick flat arches, and stucco keystones and sills.	II
Rose and Crown House; 54.12457°N 1.33117°W	—	Mid to late 18th century	The house, at one time a public house, is in rendered brick, on a plinth, with a floor band, an eaves band and a tile roof. The central doorway has an architrave and an oblong fanlight, and the windows are sashes in architraves.	II
High Farm House; 54.12440°N 1.33103°W		1769	The house is in pinkish-brown brick, with stucco quoins, floor bands, a modillion eaves cornice, and a pantile roof. There are three storeys and four bays. The doorway in the third bay has panelled reveals, a soffit, a segmental-headed fanlight, and a flat hood on brackets. The windows are sashes in architraves with decorative stucco lintels and keystones.	II
Grove House Farmhouse; 54.12214°N 1.33150°W	—	Late 18th century	The farmhouse is in pale brown brick with stepped eaves and a Roman tile roof. There are two storeys and four bays. On the garden front is a doorway with reeded pilasters, an oblong fanlight and a hood. In the ground floor are three canted bay windows, and the upper floor contains sash windows in architraves with channelled stucco lintels.	II
Dovecote behind Kirkholme; 54.12376°N 1.33204°W	—	Late 18th century	The dovecote is in reddish-brown brick, with stepped eaves, and a pyramidal pantile roof. On the front facing the street are blind Venetian panels with dove holes at the base, and a blocked segmental-arched opening in the ground floor. In the north front is a doorway, and inside there are brick dove boxes.	II
Dovecote south of Dunroyal House; 54.12264°N 1.33073°W	—	Late 18th century	The dovecote is in reddish-brown brick with stepped eaves, and has a pyramidal pantile roof with a central vent and weathervane. On the south side is a blind Diocletian window.	II
Lime Garth; 54.12336°N 1.32978°W	—	Late 18th century	The house is in pale brown brick, with quoins, red brick floor bands, a modillion eaves cornice, and a Lakeland slate roof with stone copings and kneelers. There are three storeys and three bays. Steps lead up to the central doorway that has reeded pilasters, an oblong fanlight, and a flat hood on brackets. It is flanked by canted bay windows with modillion cornices, and the other windows are sashes in architraves.	II
Old Star Cottage; 54.12347°N 1.32790°W	—	Late 18th century ((probable)	A house and a cottage in reddish-brown brick, with a floor band, dentilled eaves and a pantile roof. There are two storeys and three bays. On the front are two doorways, and most of the windows are sashes in architraves. To the right is a lower recessed wing in rendered brick, containing casement windows.	II
The Old Rectory; 54.12609°N 1.33355°W	—	Late 18th century	The rectory, later a private house, in pale brown brick, with stepped and dentilled eaves, and a tile roof with stone coping and kneelers. There are two storeys and four bays. On the front is a porch, and a doorway with reeded pilasters, friezes with paterae, a patterned radial fanlight, and an open dentilled pediment. To the left is a bow window, and the other windows are sashes in architraves, with channelled stucco lintels.	II
Brafferton Hall; 54.12570°N 1.33235°W	—	c. 1800	A house, later extended, altered and divided into two, it is in pebbledashed brick with pantile roofs. There are two storeys, eight bays, and a single-storey canted bay on the left. On the front is a porch with a segmental lead roof, and to its right is a two-storey canted bay window with a sundial.	II
Dovecote, Lodge Farm; 54.12214°N 1.32735°W		Late 18th to early 19th century	The dovecote is in pinkish-brown brick, with a stone band and modillion eaves cornice, and a slate roof with a wooden cupola. There is a hexagonal plan, a blind oculus on each face, and a blind Venetian window. Inside, there are brick dove boxes.	II
Gateposts and wall, Lodge Farmhouse; 54.12203°N 1.32802°W	—	Late 18th to early 19th century	The gateposts flanking the entrance are in reddish-brown brick, with stone bands, and caps with ball finials. To the north is a dwarf brick wall with stone coping and railings, scalloped between a pair of pilasters with stone ogee caps.	II
Park View Cottages; 54.12179°N 1.32763°W		Early 19th century	A row of four cottages in pale brown brick that have a pantile roof with stone coping and a shaped gable on the right. There are two storeys and four bays, the right corner is curved, and stepped up to meet the eaves. On the front are three doorways, two paired, and there is another doorway on the right return, all in architraves and with oblong fanlights. The windows are sashes in architraves, and all the openings have gauged red brick cambered arches.	II
Valley Shop; 54.12265°N 1.32918°W	—	Early 19th century	A cottage, at one time a shop, in pinkish-brown brick with a Welsh slate roof. There are two storeys and two bays. Steps lead up to the central doorway that has an oblong fanlight in an architrave. To its left is a bow window, and to the right is a square shop bay window, and further to the right is an added door. The upper floor contains sash windows in architraves, with segmental heads and wedge lintels.	II
Pilmoor Cottages; 54.14807°N 1.28682°W		1843	A terrace of four houses built by the Great North of England Railway Company. They are in pinkish brick, and have a Welsh slate roof with stone coping, shaped kneelers, and a moulded ridge. There are two storeys, and each house has one bay. All the openings have chamfered brick surrounds, the doorways are paired with Tudor arched heads and fanlights, and the windows are horizontally-sliding sashes. Above each pair of doors is a shield-shaped plaque with initials and the date.	II
Helperby House; 54.12427°N 1.33132°W	—	Mid 19th century	The house is in pale brown brick with stone dressings and a Welsh slate roof. There are two storeys and three bays. Steps lead up to the central doorway that has pilasters, panelled reveals and soffit, and an oblong fanlight. The windows are sashes with shallow segmental arches and flat gauged brick arches.	II
Thornton Bridge; 54.13679°N 1.33883°W		c. 1888	The bridge carries Raskell Road over the River Swale, and replaced an earlier bridge. It is in cast iron with stone abutments, and consisgs of a single segemntal arch with open trellis-work. In the spandrels are shields with coats of arms. The abutments have plain parapets, copings and terminals.	II
Town Well; 54.12318°N 1.32995°W		1897	The well was built to commemorate 60 years of the reign of Queen Victoria. It has a brass head water spout and an inscribed stone basin. The well is surrounded by sandstone Tuscan columns on high pedestals with an octagonal plan carrying a dentilled cornice and a leaded ogee dome with a lion finial.	II
