= Roger Strickland =

Sir Roger Strickland (1640–1717) was an English admiral and Member of Parliament.

== Life ==
Strickland was the second son of Walter Strickland of Nateby Hall, Lancashire, and lived at Thornton Bridge near Aldborough in Yorkshire, a property acquired from his cousin Sir Thomas Strickland of Sizergh.

He received his first command in 1665, and the following year he commanded the 48-gun Santa Maria in the Four Days' Battle (1–4 June 1666). In 1672, he commanded the 58-gun Plymouth at the Battle of Solebay, during which he recovered the Henry, which had been captured by the Dutch. He also served in the battles of Schooneveld and Texel in 1673, as a result of which he was knighted. In 1677, he was promoted to rear-admiral and served as John Narbrough's third-in-command; on 1 April 1678, with Narbrough's successor, Admiral Herbert, he captured a 40-gun Algerian cruiser.

Suspected (rightly) of being a crypto-Catholic, Strickland found his career stagnating during the later years of Charles II’s reign, and spent a period ashore in England, during which he was elected MP for Aldborough. However, he received immediate advancement on the accession of James II and returned to sea, being promoted first to vice-admiral and then to Admiral of the Blue. In the summer of 1688, he took command of the Channel Fleet, but his attempt to have the mass said publicly on board his flagship, the Mary, caused a mutiny, and he was shortly afterwards replaced by Lord Dartmouth. Nevertheless, he retained his rank until the Revolution, after which he resigned his commission and joined the dispossessed James II in France, later accompanying him to Ireland though apparently holding no command during the unsuccessful invasion.

Strickland’s name was originally included in the list of names to be attainted for treason for his support of James, though it was later removed for lack of evidence. Nevertheless, he was afterwards described officially as outlawed, and his estates were confiscated for "high treason committed on 1 May 1689". He died in exile at St Germain in 1717.

Parliament of England
| Preceded by Sir John Reresby, Bt; Sir Godfrey Copley, Bt | Member of Parliament for Aldborough; 1685–1689; With: Sir Michael Wentworth | Succeeded by Sir Michael Wentworth; Christopher Tancred |
