= Hugh Daly =

British Indian Army officer and colonial administrator (1860–1939)

Sir Hugh Daly
- Born: 29 May 1860
- Died: 25 August 1939 (aged 79)
- Relatives: General Sir Henry Daly (father); Major General Arthur Daly (son)
- Military career
- Allegiance: United Kingdom
- Branch: British Army; British Indian Army
- Rank: Lieutenant-Colonel
- Unit: Gloucestershire Regiment
- Conflicts: Third Anglo-Burmese War
- Awards: Knight Commander of the Order of the Star of India; Knight Commander of the Order of the Indian Empire; Mentioned in Despatches

Lieutenant-Colonel Sir Hugh Daly, KCSI, KCIE (29 May 1860 – 25 August 1939) was a British Indian Army officer and colonial administrator.

== Early life ==
Daly was the seventh child of General Sir Henry Dermot Daly and Susan Kirkpatrick. Like his brother, Arthur Daly, he was educated at Winchester College. He then studied at Balliol College, Oxford before being commissioned into the Gloucestershire Regiment in 1881.

== Career ==
Daly was transferred to the British Indian Army in 1883 and saw action in the Third Anglo-Burmese War, during which he was Mentioned in Despatches. Daly was Superintendent of North Shan States between 1888 and 1891. He was invested as a Companion of the Order of the Indian Empire in 1892. Daly went on to become the Assistant Secretary, Foreign Department between 1892 and 1896 and the Deputy Secretary, Foreign Department between 1896 and 1903. He was promoted to major on 10 July 1901, and later gained the rank of lieutenant-colonel in the service of the Indian Army. He was invested as a Companion of the Order of the Star of India in the 1903 Durbar Honours, and was Agent to the Governor-General in Central India between 1905 and 1910. He was Resident of Mysore and Chief Commissioner of Coorg between 1910 and 1916. Daly was invested as a Knight Commander of the Order of the Indian Empire in 1911 and as a Knight Commander of the Order of the Star of India in 1916.

Daly served as the Resident of Mysore State and Chief Commissioner of Coorg (1910–). He played a vital role in signing the 1913 Treaty of Mysore, which made the Mysore Government equal to the British India Government. He was also involved in negotiating with the Madras Presidency with regards to sharing the Cauvery River water, on behalf of the Mysore State. He served as the first honorary president of the Daly Memorial Hall. The Daly Memorial Hall in Bangalore is named after him.

== Personal life ==
Daly married Diana Maria Denison on 16 July 1891. Together they had one daughter. Daly retired to the Isle of Wight, where he died in 1939.

== Daly Memorial Hall, Bangalore ==
The foundation of the Daly Memorial Hall was laid on 30 August 1916 by Krishnaraja Wodeyar IV, the Maharaja of Mysore. The construction cost was INR 24,783, out of which INR 10,000 was granted by Krishnaraja Wodeyar IV, and the rest from other patrons such as Maharaja of Baroda, Begum of Bhopal and the Raja of Travancore. The completed Daly Memorial Hall was inaugurated on 25 July 1917 by the Kanteerava Narasimharaja Wadiyar, Yuvaraja of Mysore.
