= Daly Memorial Hall =

1917 building in Bangalore, India

Coordinates: 12°58′16.78″N 77°35′13.01″E

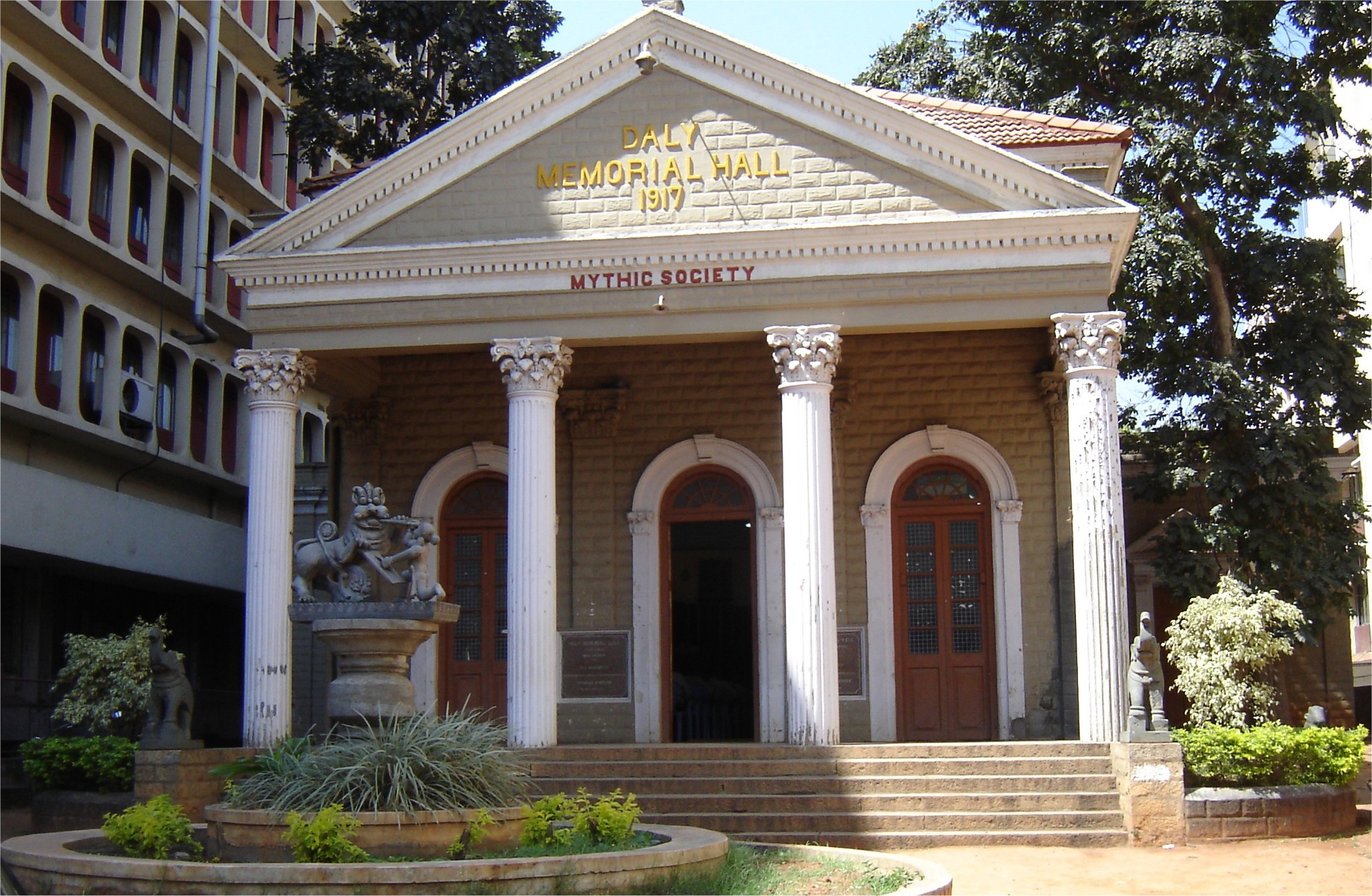
The Daly Memorial Hall in Bangalore

The Daly Memorial Hall, is a heritage building located in Bangalore, Karnataka that houses the Mythic Society. The Mythic society, founded in 1909, is a pioneering institution of Catholic-Indic studies in South India. Daly Memorial Hall, built at a cost of INR 24,783, was inaugurated on 25 July 1917 by the Kanteerava Narasimharaja Wadiyar (the Yuvaraja of Mysore. The Hall is named after Sir Hugh Daly, who served as the Resident of Mysore State and Chief Commissioner of Coorg (1910-).

== Mythic society ==
It was the creation of both the European as well as Indian residents who were eager to know India's life, society and history, in the hope that useful and interesting information might be gathered of the history, growth and source of the civilization in which people lived. The society was the brainchild of F. J. Richards who was the Collector, Bangalore cantonment District under the Madras Presidency. Richards visualised the Mythic Society as an academic 'club'. At a meeting held at his residence on 5 May 1909, a list of members likely to be interested in this 'club' was drawn up. It had seventeen names of both European and Indian residents of Bangalore including Reverend Father Antoine Marie Tabard. In the first year membership of the club touched 174. Tabard helped raise funds for the Society and served as its president from 1912

== Daly Memorial Hall ==
=== Construction ===
The foundation of the Daly Memorial Hall was laid on 30 August 1916 by Krishnaraja Wodeyar IV, the Maharaja of Mysore. The construction cost was INR 24,783, out of which INR 10,000 was granted by Krishnaraja Wodeyar IV, and the rest from other patrons such as Maharaja of Baroda, Begum of Bhopal and the Raja of Travancore. The completed Daly Memorial Hall was inaugurated on 25 July 1917 by the Kanteerava Narasimharaja Wadiyar, Yuvaraja of Mysore.

=== Architecture ===
The facade of the hall is reminiscent of the Greco-Roman style, with fluted columns capped with capitals featuring Acanthus leaves. The floor is made of reclaimed French terracotta tiles and the roof is finished with Mangalore tiles. As of 2017, the hall had been standing for a hundred years.

=== Hugh Daly ===
The Daly Memorial Hall is named after Sir Hugh Daly, who served as the Resident of Mysore State and Chief Commissioner of Coorg (1910-). He played a vital role in signing the 1913 Treaty of Mysore, which made the Mysore Government equal to the British India Government. He was also involved in negotiating with the Madras Presidency with regards to sharing the Cauvery River water, on behalf of the Mysore State. He also served as the first honorary president of the Mythic Society.

== Eminent members ==
The Mythic Society ranks among many pioneering institutions of its kind like the Royal Asiatic Society of Calcutta or the Bharath Itihasa Samshodhaka Mandal of Pune, which had strived to reconstruct India's past. Eminent historians and researchers on South India like Dr. J. F. Fleet, Dr. B. L. Rice, Dr. Jouveail Dubreuil, Sir John Marshall, Fred Goodwill, Prof. S. Krishnaswamy Aiyangar, T.A. Gopinath Rao, Mahamahopadhyaya R. Narasimhachar, V. Venkayya, H. Krishna Shastry, Dr. A. Venkatasubbiah, Dr. R. Shama Shastry, Prof. K.N. Shastry, Prof. B.M. Srikantaiah, T.T. Sharman and Dr. M.V. Krishna Rao were closely associated with the Mythic Society and many of their publications have appeared in the Quarterly Journal of the Mythic Society. The Society published a quarterly journal with academic articles written by peers. The list of council members of the society reveal that the Society had among its patrons Maharaja of Mysore and the Maharaja of Baroda.

Rev. Fred Goodwill, one of the founding members of the Mythic Society, carried out research on behalf of the society on the early history of Kolar Gold Fields and Bangalore. His scholarly work on the 'Prison Song in Bangalore', based on the experiences of A Narrative of the Captivity and Sufferings of the Officers, Soldiers and Sepoys, who fell into the Hands of Hyder-Ali, after the Battle of Conjeveram (Kanchi), September 10, 1780, is acknowledged to be part of the history of Bangalore.

== Library ==
The Society houses a library which has many rare books in its collection over 46,000 books. The library is also now the home to the personal book collections of eminent individuals like Diwan C. Hayavadana Rao, Diwan V. P. Madhava Rao, R. Ananda Rao, Prof. K. N. V. Shastry and Prof. Mugali.
