= Henry Daly =

British Indian Army officer and colonial administrator

Sir Henry Daly
- Born: 25 October 1823
- Died: 21 July 1895 (aged 71); Ryde, Isle of Wight
- Relatives: Sir Hugh Daly (son); Major General Arthur Daly (son)
- Military career
- Allegiance: East India Company; United Kingdom
- Branch: Bombay Army
- Rank: General
- Commands: 21st Prince Albert Victor's Own Cavalry (Frontier Force) (Daly's Horse)
- Conflicts: Second Anglo-Sikh War; Indian Mutiny
- Awards: Knight Grand Cross of the Order of the Bath; Companion of the Order of the Indian Empire

General Sir Henry Dermot Daly, GCB, CIE (25 October 1823 – 21 July 1895) was a senior British Indian Army officer, colonial administrator, Liberal Unionist politician and founder of Daly College.

== Military career ==
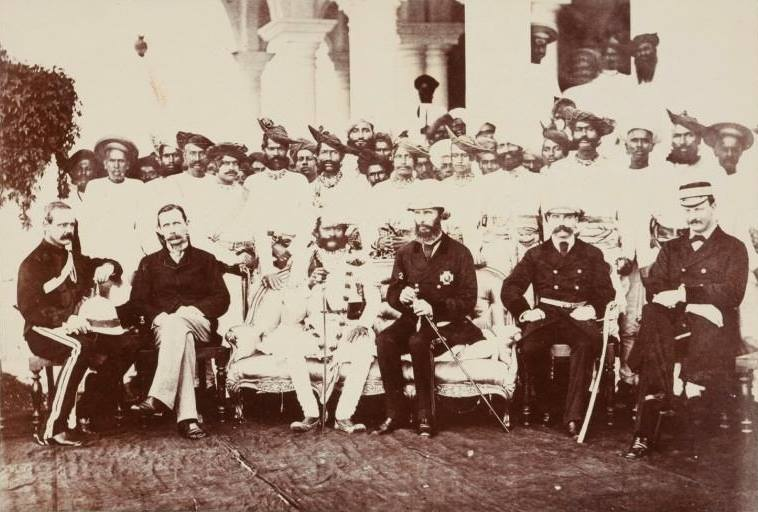
HH Maharaja Sir Jayaji Rao Scindia of Gwalior State, General Sir Henry Daly (Founder of The Daly College), with British officers and Maratha nobility (Sardars, Jagirdars & Mankaris) in Indore, Holkar State, c. 1879.

Daly was the son of Lieutenant-Colonel Francis Dermot Daly, an officer in the 4th Light Dragoons, and his wife, Mary McIntosh. He joined the Bombay Infantry as an officer cadet in 1840. Along with several similarly aged young officers, such as Herbert Edwardes and Patrick Alexander Vans Agnew, Daly was sent to "advise" the Sikhs as part of Henry Lawrence's "Young Men". He served in the Second Anglo-Sikh War and was present at the Siege of Multan. On 18 May 1849, he raised the 1st Punjab Irregular Cavalry, which subsequently became the 21st Prince Albert Victor's Own Cavalry (Frontier Force) (Daly's Horse). Daly was promoted to the rank of captain in 1854 and led his regiment during the Indian Mutiny. The regiment operated in North India and took part in the Siege of Delhi and the Relief of Lucknow. He went on the command the Brigade of Hodson's Horse during the war. Daly was twice recommended for the Victoria Cross as a result of his conduct.

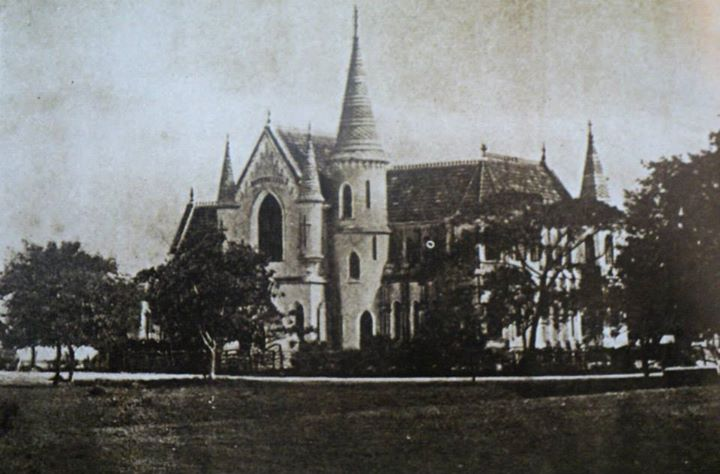
Old Campus of The Daly College, Indore

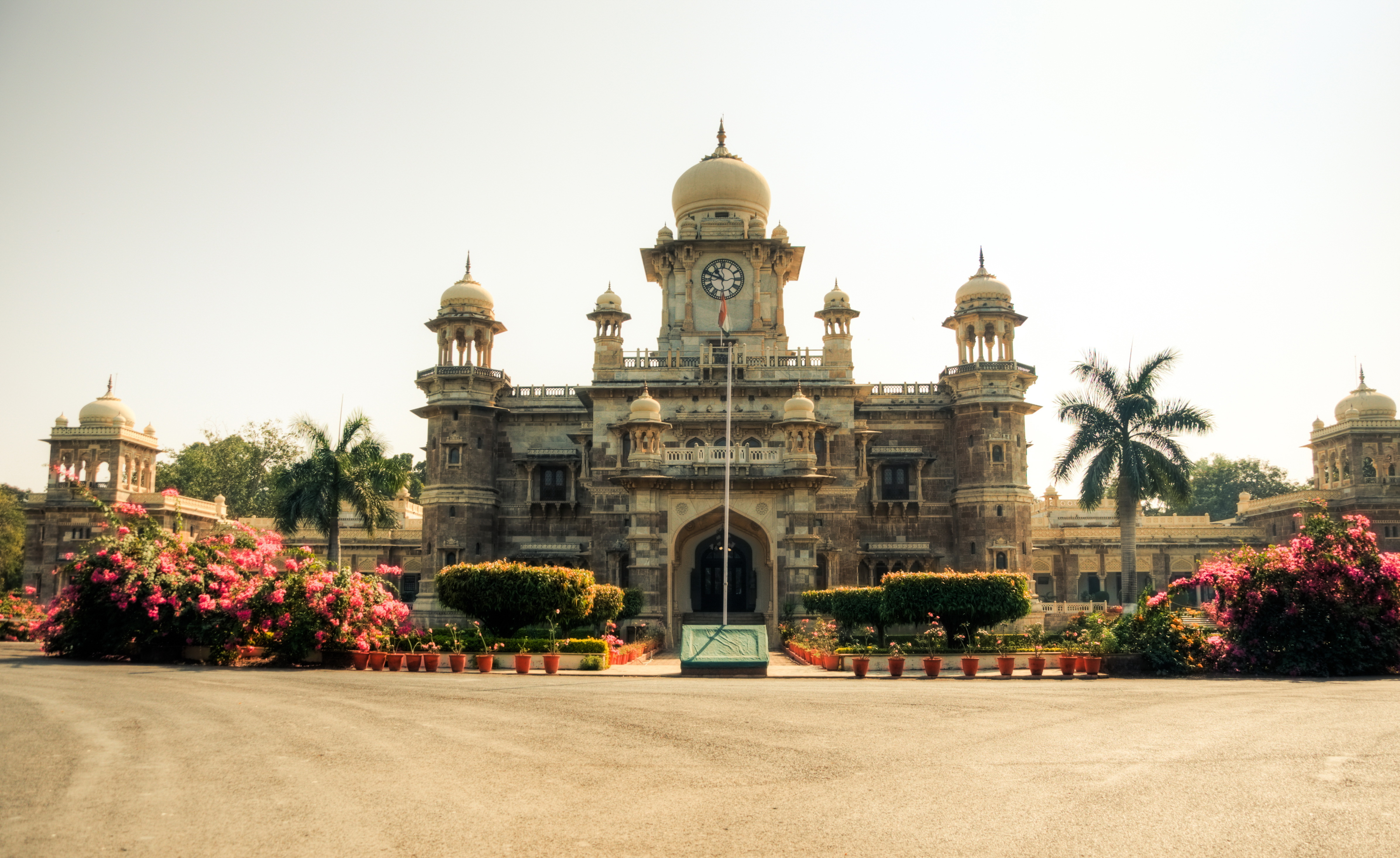
The Daly College

Daly subsequently served in the Bombay Staff Corps. He held the position of Governor General of India's Agent, in Central India between 1870 and 1881, and was promoted to lieutenant-general in 1877. He became a Knight Commander of the Order of the Bath on 29 May 1875, and a Knight Grand Cross in the same order on 25 May 1889. Before leaving India, Daly had taken a great interest in education and had begun a college in Indore, which was later named after him. In the General Election of 1886, Daly stood as the Liberal Unionist candidate in Dundee. He was beaten by the Liberal Party candidate. He also unsuccessfully contested the seat for the Liberal Unionists in the 1888 Dundee by-election.

== Personal life ==
Daly married, firstly, Susan, the daughter of Edward Kirkpatrick, on 21 October 1852. Together they had eight children; two of their sons were Sir Hugh Daly and Arthur Daly. He married, secondly, Charlotte, daughter of James Coape, in 1882, and they had one son.

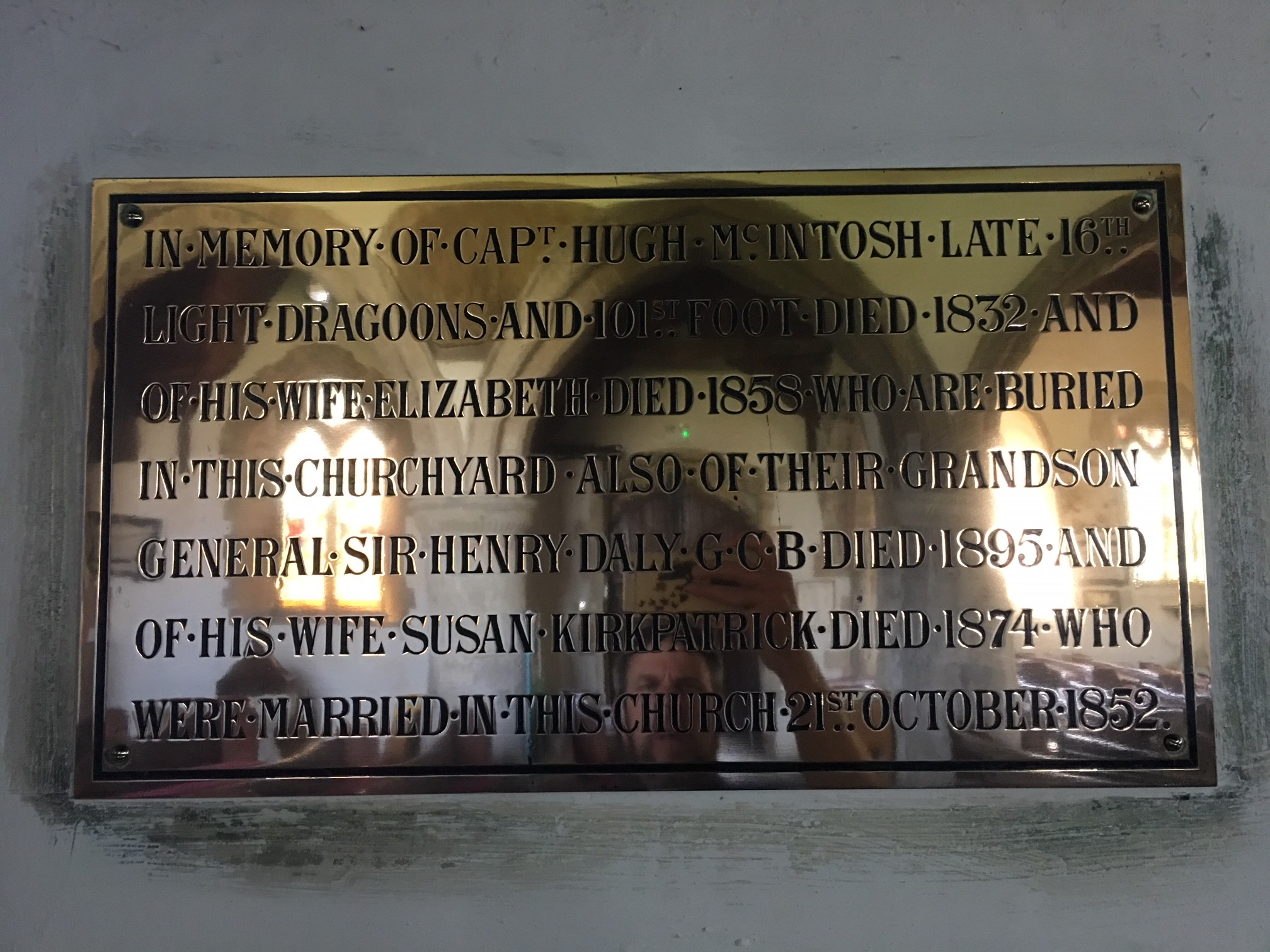
Memorial to Henry Daly in St Mary's Church, Carisbrooke, Isle of Wight
