= Arthur Daly (British Army officer) =

British Army general (1871–1936)

Major-General Arthur Daly CB CMG
- Born: 14 May 1871
- Died: 28 August 1936 (aged 65); Sevenoaks, Kent, England
- Relatives: General Sir Henry Dermot Daly (father); Sir Hugh Daly (brother)
- Military career
- Allegiance: United Kingdom
- Branch: British Army
- Service years: 1890–1928
- Rank: Major-General
- Units: Welch Regiment; West Yorkshire Regiment
- Commands: 24th Division (1917–19); 33rd Infantry Brigade (1917); 6th Infantry Brigade (1915–17)
- Conflicts: Second Boer War; First World War
- Awards: Companion of the Order of the Bath; Companion of the Order of St Michael and St George; Mentioned in Despatches; Croix de guerre (France)

Major-General Arthur Crawford Daly, CB, CMG (14 May 1871 – 28 August 1936) was a senior British Army officer.

== Military career ==
Daly was the eighth child and youngest son of General Sir Henry Dermot Daly and Susan Kirkpatrick, and the brother of Hugh Daly. He was educated at Winchester College and the Royal Military College, Sandhurst, before being commissioned into the Welch Regiment in April 1890. He was subsequently transferred to the West Yorkshire Regiment, was promoted to lieutenant on 7 March 1892, and then, while serving as an adjutant, to captain on 15 February 1899.

Appointed adjutant of the 2nd Battalion on 15 February 1898, he first saw active service in the Second Boer War, during which he was severely wounded during action in Natal. He was reported seriously ill with enteric fever near Pietermaritzburg in March 1900, but recovered, was mentioned in despatches (dated 8 April 1902), and received a brevet promotion as major in the South African Honours list published on 26 June 1902. Following the end of the war in June 1902, he left Cape Town on the SS Sicilia and returned to Southampton in late July, where he went back as a regular officer in his regiment.

He was promoted to major in March 1910. On 4 September 1912 he became a commander of a company of gentlemen cadets at the RMC, Sandhurst.

After the outbreak of the First World War, Daly became deputy assistant quartermaster general of the IV Corps in October 1914. He was assistant adjutant and quartermaster general of the 7th Division between 1914 and 1915. He was promoted to lieutenant colonel in 1915, and was given his first brigade command in May, the 6th Infantry Brigade, taking over from Major General Robert Fanshawe and for which he was promoted to the temporary rank of brigadier general while commanding the brigade. He then commanded the 33rd Infantry Brigade between February and September 1917, when he was made commander of the 24th Division in September 1917, when he was promoted to temporary major general. He held this post until the division was disbanded in 1919. Daly was made a Companion of the Order of the Bath in January 1918 "for valuable services rendered in connection with Military Operations in the Field" and a Companion of the Order of St Michael and St George in 1919.

He was promoted to substantive major general in January 1923 and was inspector general and military advisor to the minister of defence in Iraq between 1925 and 1927, and, after serving on half-pay from August 1927, retired from the army on 19 December 1928.

== Personal life ==
Daly married Grace Wilkinson, the daughter of Major H. C. Wilkinson, in 1897. Together they had two children. Daly's son was Air Vice-Marshal George Dermot Daly (1898–1974). Daly died in Sevenoaks, Kent, in 1936, at the age of 65.

Military offices
Preceded by Louis Bols	GOC 24th Division; 1917–1919	Post disbanded
