= Brafferton and Helperby =

Civil parish in North Yorkshire, England

Coordinates: 54.123°N 1.329°W

- Civil parish
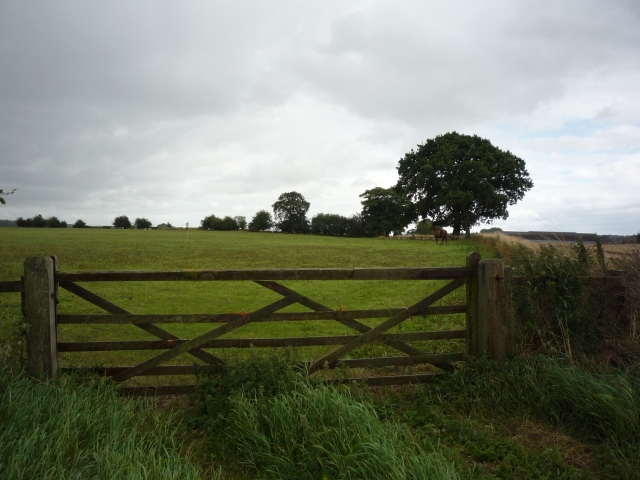
- Land at Brafferton and Helperby

- Location within North Yorkshire
- Population: 831 (2011 census)
- OS grid reference: SE438699
- Unitary authority: North Yorkshire
- Ceremonial county: North Yorkshire
- Region: Yorkshire and the Humber
- Country: England
- Sovereign state: United Kingdom

Brafferton and Helperby is a civil parish in the county of North Yorkshire, England. Up until 2019, both Brafferton and Helperby were in their own civil parishes, but a vote, and then later an order was convened, to amalgamate the two into one parish covering both villages.

== History ==
The ancient (ecclesiastical) parish of Brafferton, also included Helperby within the parish domain. When civil parishes were introduced, the two villages were separated out, but are a contiguous settlement with Brafferton at the north end, and Helperby at the south end. On 1 April 2019, the two parishes were combined into one civil parish – Brafferton and Helperby, with seven elected council members. Previous to this, each council had five members.

== Local authority ==
Historically, the ecclesiastical parish of Brafferton included Helperby and Thornton Bridge, where Helperby was described as a township. Both previous civil parishes were instituted in 1894, both fulfilling the requirements of the Local Government Act 1894 (56 & 57 Vict. c. 73), which stipulated anywhere with 200 or more voters, could have a parish council. In 1999, the two separate civil parishes of Brafferton and Helperby pooled their money and resources to build a new village hall, which is situated in Helperby next to the war memorial.

At the 2011 Census, Brafferton had a population of 311 and Helperby had 520. In 2015, North Yorkshire County Council estimated that the two villages had a population of 820 people – 300 in Brafferton and 520 in Helperby.

From 1974 to 2023 it was part of the Hambleton District, it is now administered by the unitary North Yorkshire Council.

== See also ==
- Listed buildings in Brafferton and Helperby
