= List of methanol poisoning incidents =

Outbreaks of methanol toxicity have occurred when methanol is used to lace moonshine (bootleg liquor), which is an alcohol-related crime. However, it may also happen if ethanol has been contaminated.

Methanol is a toxic alcohol to humans via ingestion due to metabolism. Ingestion of as little as 3.16 grams of methanol can cause irreversible optic nerve damage, and the oral LD50 for humans is estimated to be 56.2 grams. This does not happen with ethanol, which breaks down into acetic acid, which is non-toxic in small amounts. Reference dose for methanol is 0.5 mg/kg/day. Toxic effects take hours to start, and effective antidotes, like ethanol, can often prevent permanent damage. Because of its similarities in both appearance and odor to ethanol (the alcohol in beverages), it is difficult to differentiate between the two.

== Antarctica ==
On May 11, 2000, Rodney Marks unexpectedly became unwell while walking between the remote observatory and the base of Amundsen–Scott South Pole Station. Over a 36-hour period, Marks became increasingly sick, before dying on May 12, 2000. How Marks got methanol poisoning remains unknown.

== Australia ==
In 2013 three people died and one suffered partial blindness when they ingested a home-made beverage containing methanol.

In 1997 two people from Central Australia died and two survived after ingesting a drink made from methanol and other alcoholic beverages.

== Brazil ==
In 1999, 35 people died in 10 cities of the state of Bahia as a result of drinking cachaça contaminated with methanol. Further investigation revealed concentrations as high as 24.84% methanol. Over 20 days, 450 people were hospitalized with symptoms of methanol ingestion.

In September 2025, the São Paulo government confirmed that three people died due to methanol poisoning in alcoholic beverages in the city of São Paulo and in São Bernardo do Campo, in the state of São Paulo. The Brazilian Association to Combat Counterfeiting said it suspects that the methanol used to adulterate alcoholic beverages may be the same one illegally imported by the criminal organization Primeiro Comando da Capital to adulterate fuels.

== Cambodia ==
In 2012, 49 people died, and more than 300 people were hospitalized, after drinking rice wine contaminated by methanol.

== Costa Rica ==
25 people died in August 2019 due to methanol poisoning.

== Czech Republic ==
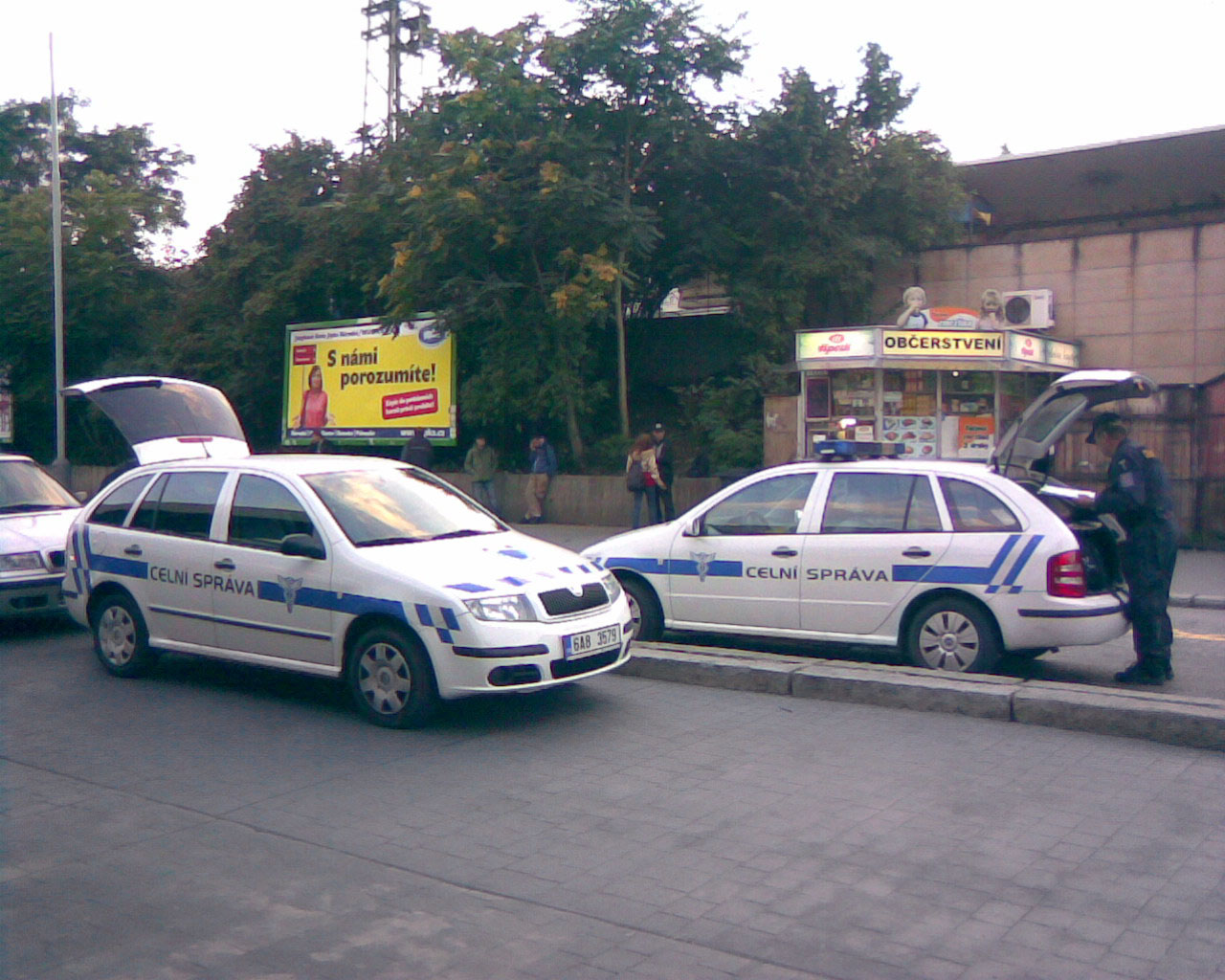
Customs Administration of the Czech Republic monitors observance of the ban in Prague, September 13.

The 2012 Czech Republic methanol poisonings occurred in September 2012 in the Czech Republic, Poland and Slovakia. Over the course of several days, 38 people in the Czech Republic and four people in Poland died as a result of methanol poisoning and several tens of others were taken to hospital.

== El Salvador ==
In El Salvador, as many as 122 people died in 2000 as a result of drinking low quality liquors sold in unauthorized shops that were found to be adulterated with methanol. The incident prompted the authorities to declare a 10-day emergency prohibition and a massive inspection of alcohol-vending establishments. The root cause was believed to be an act of terrorism, possibly a social cleansing campaign targeted against alcoholics, as the offending distilleries were not found to be responsible for the methanol contents that were present in the affected liquors.

== Estonia ==
The Pärnu methanol poisoning incident occurred in Pärnu county, Estonia, in September 2001, when 68 people died and 43 were left disabled after contents of stolen methanol canisters were used in production of bootleg liquor.

== India ==
India has a thriving moonshine industry, and methanol-tainted batches have killed over 2,000 people in the last 3 decades, including:

- 1976: 100 people died in Gujarat.
- 1980: 44 died in Haryana
- 1981: 1981 Karnataka liquor deaths
- 1982: Vypin alcohol poisonings
- 1986: 108 died in Gujarat.
- 1987: 200 died in Gujarat.
- 1988: 32 people died in Gujarat.
- 1992: 1992 Odisha liquor deaths
- 2001: 27 deaths in Bombay.
- 2004: In December 2004, 87 people died in Mumbai.
- 2006: 22 people killed in Ganjam district, Orissa.
- 2008: 2008 Karnataka-Tamil Nadu hooch tragedy
- 2009
  - 27 people killed in Kolkata, West Bengal
  - 29 people killed in Uttar Pradesh
  - 2009 Gujarat alcohol poisonings
  - >30 deaths, Delhi.
  - >30 deaths, Orissa Bolangir.
- 2010
  - 35 people killed in Ghaziabad and Bulandshahr districts, Uttar Pradesh
  - 23 people killed in Malappuram district, Kerala
  - 10 deaths, Uttar Pradesh.
- 2011
  - 17 dead in Andhra Pradesh, August.
  - Sangrampur methanol tragedy
- 2012
  - 17 deaths, Andhra Pradesh.
  - 31 deaths, Orissa.
  - 18 people died in Gurdaspur district of Punjab in a possible methanol-poisoning incident. The Chemical Analyzer and Histo-pathology department took care of the bodies and will ascertain the exact cause of death.
- 2013: 40 people died in Azamgarh district, Uttar Pradesh.
- 2015: 2015 Mumbai alcohol poisoning incident
- 2017: On 3 January at least 6 people died at Ramgopalpur, West Bengal
- 2019
  - In February 2019, 100 people in the northern states of Uttar Pradesh and Uttarakhand died by drinking toxic alcohol.
  - 2019 Assam alcohol poisonings
- 2022: 2022 Gujarat alcohol poisoning
- 2024: 2024 Kallakurichi alcohol poisonings

== Indonesia ==
Arak that has been laced has contributed to deaths due to methanol toxicity.

== Iran ==
In 2013, as a result of methanol mass poisoning in Iran 694 people were hospitalised in the city of Rafsanjan. 8 people were reported dead due to severe intoxication.

During the COVID-19 pandemic in Iran, nearly 300 people died and over a thousand became ill from drinking methanol in the belief that drinking it can kill the virus in the body.

== Ireland ==
Two men were killed in a methanol poisoning incident near to Burtonport, County Donegal, Ireland in 2014 after drinking what was claimed to be poitín (an Irish moonshine made from potatoes). One man was native Irish and the other a Lithuanian immigrant. A bottle seized at the scene of one poisoning was found to contain 97% methanol.

In 2017 a person was severely poisoned after buying "vodka" from an unlicensed seller in the Ballymun area of Dublin; the bottle had been refilled with a liquid containing methanol.

== Italy ==
In 1986, the methanol-tainted wine scandal was a fraud perpetrated by adulterating table wine with methanol, poisoning over a hundred people, with 90 hospitalized, 23 deaths, and many others heavily injured (blindness and neurological damages).

== Laos ==
In November 2024, six foreign tourists - including two Australian teenagers, two Danish women, one British lawyer, and one American tourist - died of suspected methanol poisoning after consuming laced alcohol at the Nana Backpackers Hostel in the town of Vang Vieng, Laos. Several others were hospitalized in Thailand after experiencing symptoms such as nausea, vomiting, and dizziness.

The incident led to the arrest of eleven staff members from the hostel and prompted an investigation by Laotian authorities to identify the source of the contamination. Several governments, including Australia, updated their travel advisories, warning citizens about the dangers of unregulated local alcohol in Southeast Asia.

== Libya ==
At least 51 people died in Tripoli in 2013. The consumption and sale of alcohol is illegal in Libya.

== Madagascar ==
The Madagascar methanol mass poisoning occurred in 1998 when 200 people died.

== Malaysia ==
From September until October 2018, 45 people have been reported died of methanol poisoning from drinking fake liquor. In this incident, the methanol content was up to 50 times more than the permissible amount. Cases of toxic alcohol poisoning have been reported in Selangor, the Federal Territories of Kuala Lumpur and Putrajaya, Perak and Negeri Sembilan. The deaths comprised various nationalities mostly of foreign workers from Bangladesh, Indonesia, Myanmar and Nepal. Around 30 people including three Indian nationals, believed to be responsible for the distribution of cheap counterfeit liquor to retailers around Selayang and Desa Jaya which led to the methanol poisoning incident have been arrested.

== Mexico ==
Government restrictions on liquor and beer sales during the COVID-19 pandemic may have exacerbated the problem of illegal production and sale of alcoholic beverages in Mexico. Reportedly, 35 people died in 2020 in just one mass poisoning incident due to methanol tainted drinks.

== Morocco ==
Between September 28 and 29, 2022, 21 deaths occurred in the northern Moroccan city of Ksar El Kebir. Between May 31 and June 2, 2023, 9 deaths occurred in the Moroccan city of Meknes.

== Nigeria ==
Between April 14 and April 26, 2015, 23 deaths were recorded in relation to methanol poisoning in Ayadi and Ode-Irele towns of Irele Local Government Area in Ondo State.

66 people in Rivers State died over a few weeks that started in April 2015 due to methanol-contaminated ogogoro.

== Norway ==
Between September 2002 and December 2004, 51 people were admitted to hospital with symptoms of methanol poisoning, of whom 9 died. A further 8 people who died outside hospital were found to have died from methanol poisoning following autopsy. The liquor responsible for all of the cases contained 20% methanol and 80% ethanol and probably came from the same source in southern Europe.

== Peru ==
In October 2022 in Lima, Peru 54 people died due to consuming fruit-flavored vodka that was laced with methanol. The source of the methanol was from windshield washer fluid and antifreeze.

== Philippines ==
The Luzon lambanog deaths started to occur in late November 2018 in separate places in the Philippines after drinking arrack (known locally as lambanog). The case started on November 29 when the residents from Calamba, Laguna drank lambanog and began to experience symptoms such as stomach cramps, resulting in hospital admission; they subsequently died. People who consumed lambanog experienced other symptoms such as nausea, chest pains, and blurry vision. Meanwhile, four tricycle drivers were reported to have died after they consumed arrack and thirteen others were hospitalized in Quezon City.

In December 2019, at least 23 people died while around 300 were hospitalized after drinking methanol-laced lambanog in the provinces of Laguna and Quezon. Separate incidents of methanol poisoning involving lambanog were also reported in 2018 which caused at least 21 deaths.

== Russia ==
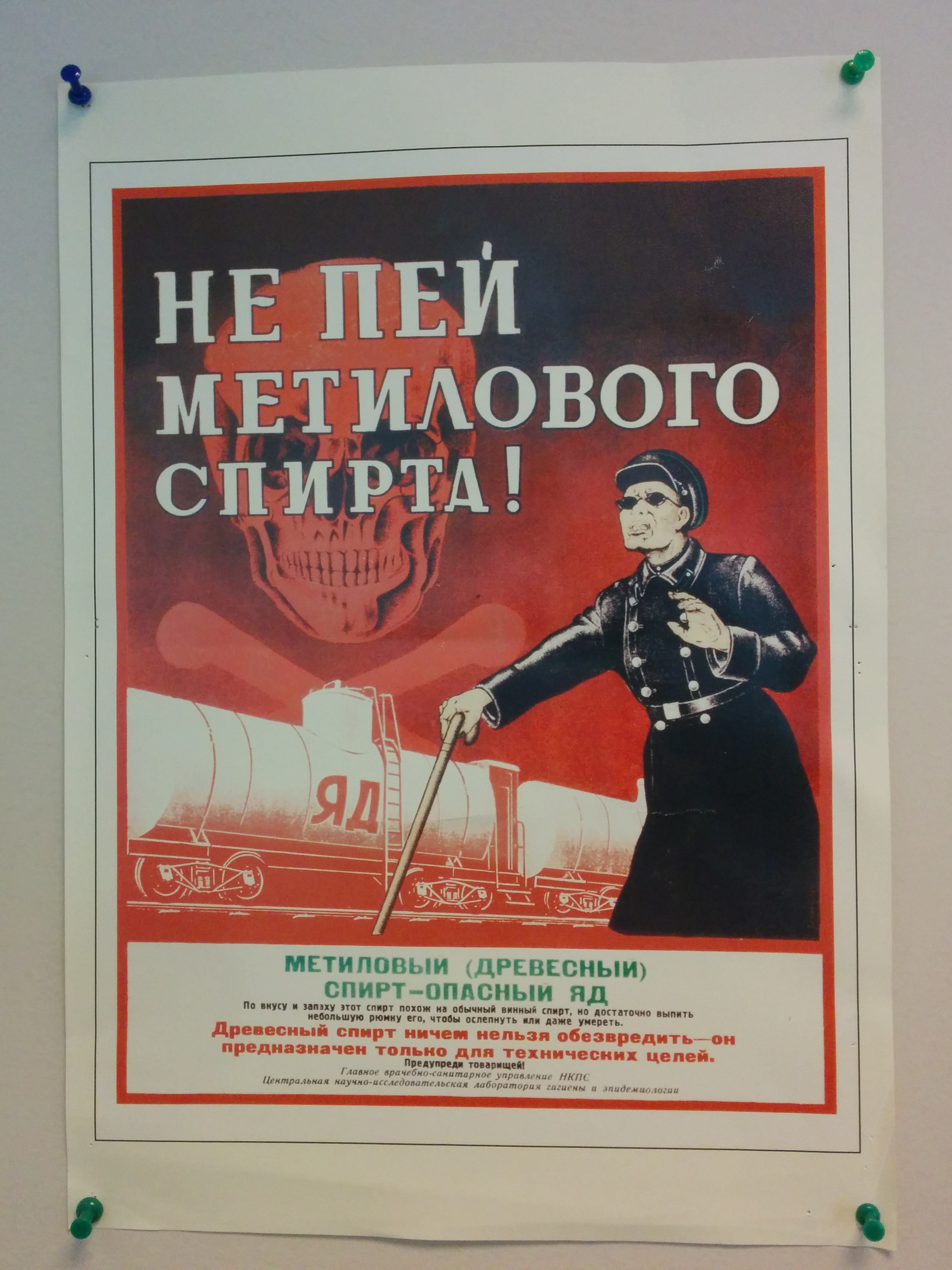
Russian poster warning people about the dangers of drinking methanol.

In October and November 2005, 34 people in Magadan died from methanol poisoning after drinking tainted liquor.

In December 2016, 72 people died in a mass methanol poisoning in Irkutsk, Siberia. The poisoning was precipitated by drinking counterfeit surrogate alcohol—actually scented bath lotion that was marked as not safe for consumption. Named Boyaryshnik ("Hawthorn"), it was described by the Associated Press as being counterfeit.

In October 2021, in Orenburg, 35 people died and 33 others were poisoned in a mass surrogate alcohol poisoning. 7 people were noted as being in serious condition, and 3 people were placed on ventilators. 10 people were arrested for the incident.

Also, in October 2021 18 people died and a number were poisoned in another mass surrogate alcohol poisoning in Yekaterinburg and towns nearby. Two persons were arrested.

In May–June 2023, at least 30 people died and 96 were poisoned in the Samara region by cider contaminated with methanol and ethyl butyrate. The contaminated alcohol had reportedly been stolen from a warehouse of the Russian Interior Ministry. Four people, including one police officer, were arrested.

== Serbia ==
In 1998, 43 people died after drinking Rakia which contained between 40-75% methanol per bottle. The case is commonly known as the "Zozovača affair". There were also at least 13 people with permanent health consequences.

== Spain ==
In 1963, methanol was used in the preparation of bottled mixed alcohol drinks such as coffee liqueur. According official records, 51 died and 9 lost their sight, but according to newspapers there may have been thousands of victims, mainly in Galicia and the Canary Islands.

== Turkey ==
- 2004 - 21 deaths in Istanbul,
- 2005 - 23 deaths in Istanbul,
- 2011 - 5 Russian tourists died in the Turkish Riviera,
- 2015 - 32 deaths in Istanbul, 3 deaths in İzmir.
- 2020 - At least 44 deaths from bootleg drink made with methanol around the country.
- 2021 - 22 deaths in Istanbul.
- November to December 2024 - at least 37 deaths
- 2025 - at least 124 deaths in Istanbul alcohol poisonings

== Uganda ==
In April 2010, 80 people died from multiple organ dysfunction syndrome after drinking waragi adulterated with a high amount of methanol over a three-week period in Kabale District. Many of the deaths were blamed on the reluctance of people to openly admit their relatives had been drinking it, allowing the abuse of the substance to continue. When revelations came about houses were searched, with around 120 jerrycans uncovered.

== United States ==
In December 1963, a rash of 31 deaths in Philadelphia's homeless population was traced to a local store that knowingly sold Sterno to people for them to consume and get drunk.

In January 2016, consumption of a mixture of Mountain Dew and methanol, referred to as Dewshine, resulted in the reported deaths of two Tennessee high school students. The methanol in this case was believed to come from racing fuel.

In April 2018, a Massachusetts man died after ingesting alcohol that was contaminated with methanol. The product consumed was labeled "Ethanol Extraction 95% ethanol and 5% water". An FDA recall was issued and the company is no longer selling the product which was sold over the internet and shipped by the U.S. Postal Service.
