= Article 47 of the Constitution of India =

Directs Indian state to improve standard of living and public health

Article 47 of The Constitution of India is one of the Directive Principles which directs the State to raise the level of nutrition and the standard of living and to improve public health as among its primary duties and, in particular, the State shall endeavour to bring about prohibition of intoxicating drinks and drugs which are injurious to health.

== See also ==
- The Lakshadweep Prohibition Regulation, 1979
- The Nagaland Liquor Total Prohibition Act, 1989
- Bombay Prohibition (Gujarat Amendment) 2009
- Bihar Excise (Amendment) Act, 2016
