= Bengal hooch tragedy =

The Bengal Hooch Tragedy may refer to two different but similar events:

- 2011 Bengal hooch tragedy
- 2015 Bengal hooch tragedy

In each case, a large number of people died in West Bengal after consumption of liquor mixed with methanol.
