= 2012 Odisha alcohol poisonings =

The 2012 Odisha alcohol poisonings (alternatively known as the Cuttack hooch tragedy) killed at least 29 people in the Indian state of Odisha in February 2012.

28 people died in Cuttack and one succumbed at the Capital hospital in Bhubaneswar. As many as 51 others are still battling for survival in SCB Medical College and Hospital. The victims, mostly poor men from Cuttack and Khordha districts and the local brew seller himself, had consumed spurious liquor from a joint in Mahidharpada area of Cuttack on 6 February 2012. The liquor contained medicines such as that used to treat cold, cough and to dress wounds. Later, 10 people were arrested. They include the powerful and influential liquor kingpin's relatives and officials of the pharmaceutical companies who provided the liquor makers with chemicals.

Chief minister of Odisha Naveen Patnaik ordered a judicial inquiry into the incident. But, rejecting the government's decision of a judicial probe in the alcohol poisonings, opposition Congress party accused the state excise minister A. U. Singhdeo of being responsible for the tragedy and alleged that the excise minister has direct links with the powerful liquor mafias of Odisha.

== See also ==
- Alcohol prohibition in India
- List of alcohol poisonings in India
