= Beef =

Meat from cattle

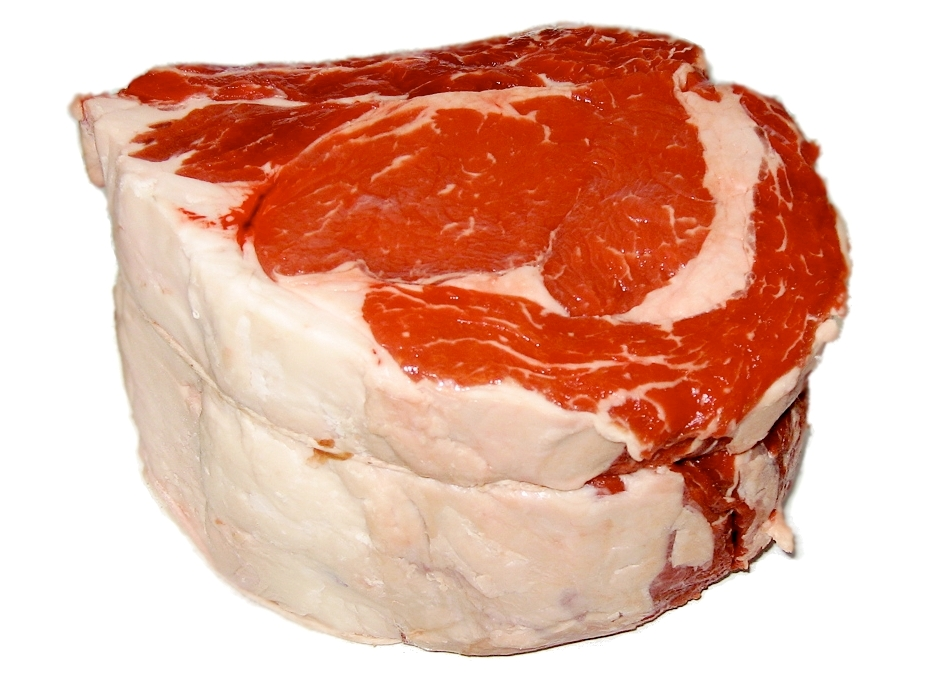
A raw rib roast

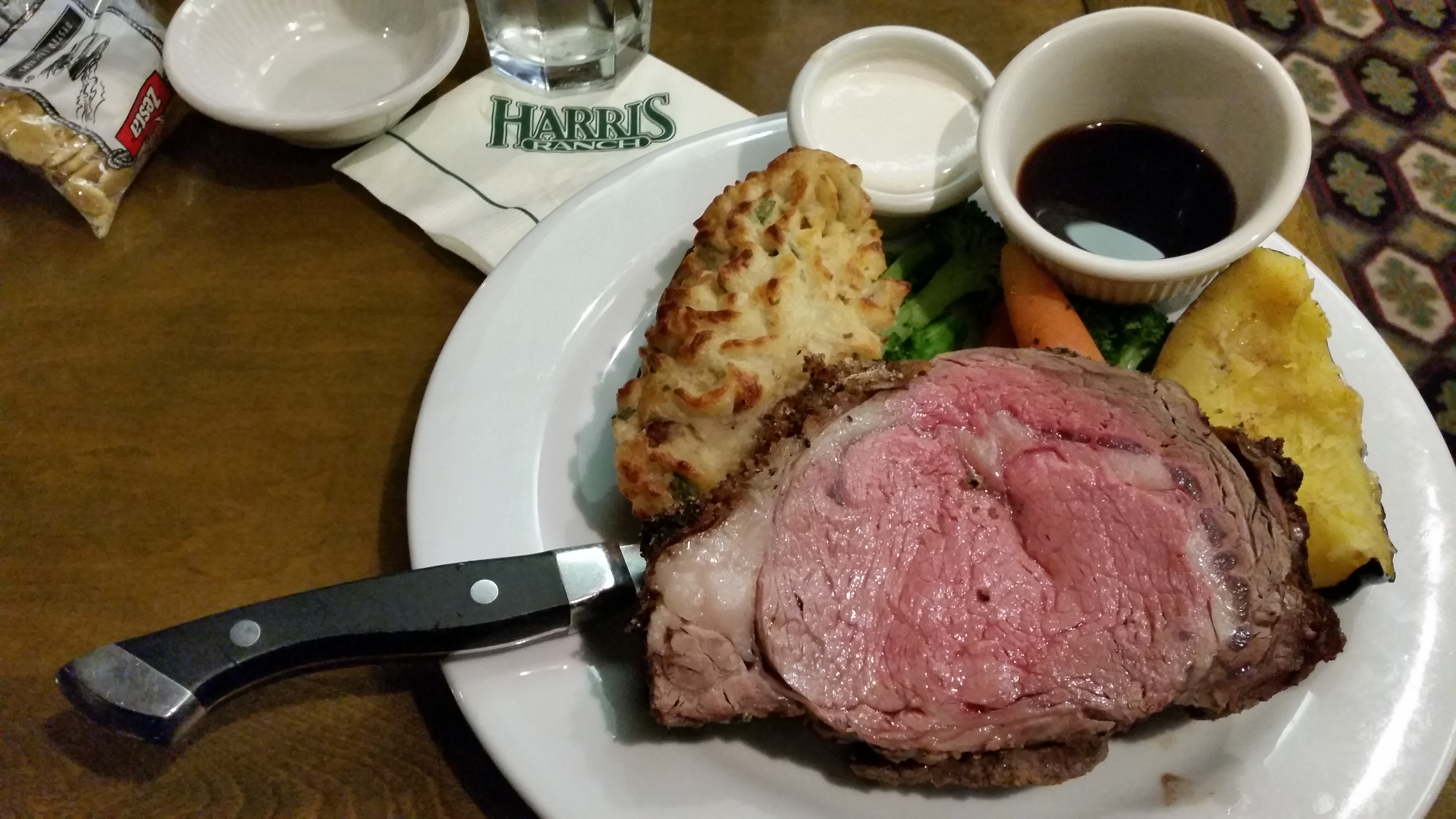
A serving of prime rib roast

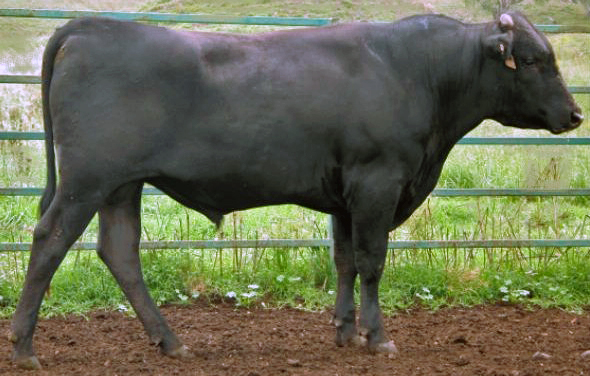
Wagyu cattle are an example of a breed raised primarily for beef

Beef is the culinary name for meat from cattle (Bos taurus). Beef can be prepared in various ways; cuts are often used for steak, which can be cooked to varying degrees of doneness, while trimmings are often ground or minced, as found in most hamburgers. Beef contains protein, iron, and vitamin B12. Along with other kinds of red meat, high consumption is associated with an increased risk of colorectal cancer and cardiovascular disease, especially when processed. Beef has a high environmental impact, being a primary driver of deforestation with the highest greenhouse gas emissions of any agricultural product.

In prehistoric times, humans hunted aurochs and later domesticated them. Since that time, numerous breeds of cattle have been bred specifically for the quality or quantity of their meat. Today, beef is the third most widely consumed meat in the world, after pork and poultry. As of 2018, the United States, Brazil, and China were the largest producers of beef.

Some religions and cultures prohibit beef consumption, especially Indian religions like Hinduism. Buddhists are also against animal slaughtering, but they do not have a wrongful eating doctrine.

== Etymology ==
The word beef is from the Latin word bōs, in contrast to cow which is from Middle English cou (both words have the same Indo-European root *gʷou-).

This is one example of the common English dichotomy between the words for animals (with largely Germanic origins) and their meat (with Romanic origins) that is also found in such English word-pairs as pig/pork, deer/venison, sheep/mutton, and chicken/poultry (also the less common goat/chevon). Beef is cognate with bovine through the Late Latin bovīnus. The rarely used plural form of beef is beeves.

== History ==
People have eaten the flesh of bovines since prehistoric times. The aurochs, the ancestor of modern domestic cattle, is known to have been hunted and consumed by Neanderthals. Some of the earliest known cave paintings, such as those of Lascaux, show aurochs in hunting scenes. People domesticated cattle to provide ready access to beef, milk, and leather. Cattle have been domesticated at least twice over the course of evolutionary history. The first domestication event occurred around 10,500 years ago with the evolution of Bos taurus. The second was more recent, around 7,000 years ago, with the evolution of Bos indicus in the Indian subcontinent. There is a possible third domestication event 8,500 years ago, with a potential third species Bos africanus arising in Africa.

In the United States, the growth of the beef business was largely due to expansion in the Southwest. Upon the acquisition of grasslands through the Mexican–American War of 1848, and later the expulsion of the Plains Indians from this region and the Midwest, the American livestock industry began, starting primarily with the taming of feral and semi-feral Longhorn cattle. Chicago and New York City were the first to benefit from these developments in their stockyards and in their meat markets.

== Production ==
Beef and buffalo meat production tonnes

Cattle is the third most commonly consumed meat worldwide

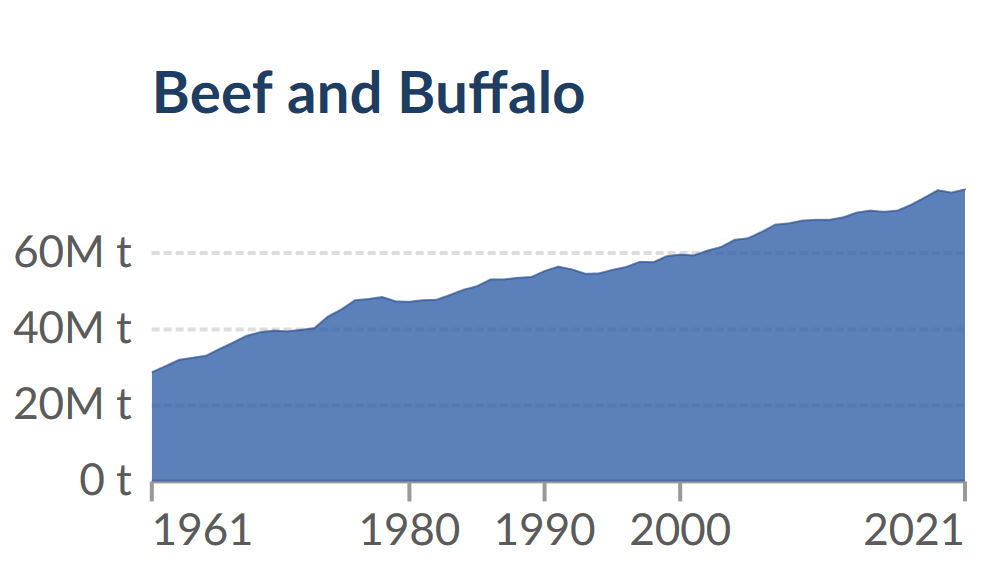
Beef (and buffalo meat) production has grown substantially over the recent 60 years.

Beef has the highest emissions intensity of any agricultural commodity.

Beef cattle are raised and fed using a variety of methods, including feedlots, free range, ranching, backgrounding and intensive animal farming. Concentrated Animal Feeding Operations (CAFOs), commonly referred to as factory farms, are commonly used to meet the demand of beef production. CAFOs supply 70.4% of cows in the US market and 99% of all meat in the United States supply. Cattle CAFOs can also be a source of E. coli contamination in the food supply due to the prevalence of manure in CAFOs. These E. coli contaminations include one strain, E. coli O157:H7, which can be toxic to humans, because cattle typically hold this strain in their digestive system. Another consequence of unsanitary conditions created by high-density confinement systems is increased use of antibiotics in order to prevent illness. An analysis of FDA sales data by the Natural Resources Defense Council found 42% of medically important antibiotic use in the U.S. was on cattle, posing concerns about the development of antibiotic resistant bacteria. In 2023 production was forecast to peak by 2035.

=== Environmental impact ===
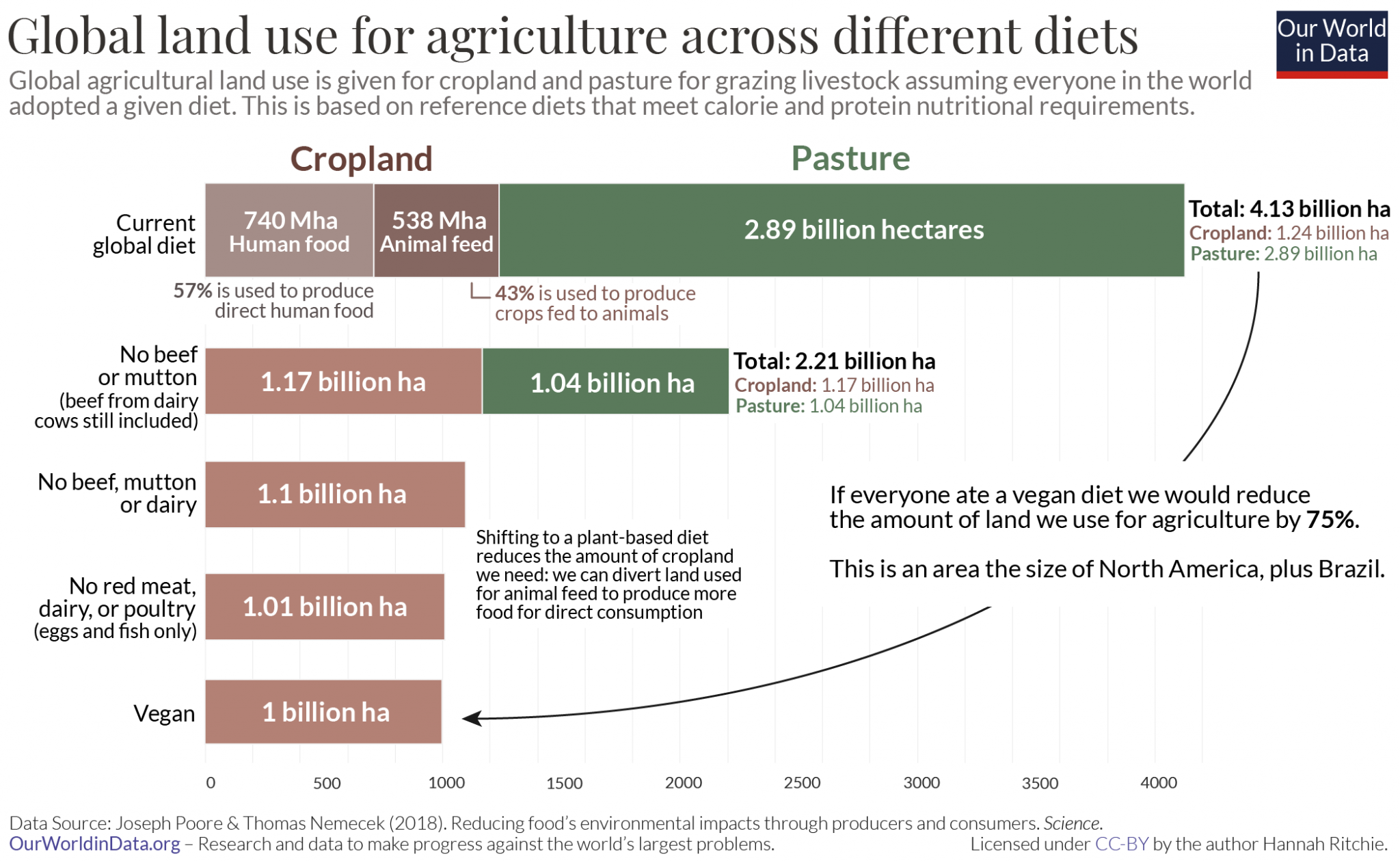
Agricultural land worldwide could be reduced by almost half if no beef or mutton were eaten.

Mean greenhouse gas emissions for different food types
Food Types	Greenhouse Gas Emissions (g CO2-Ceq per g protein)
Ruminant Meat	62
Recirculating Aquaculture	30
Trawling Fishery	26
Non-recirculating Aquaculture	12
Pork	10
Poultry	10
Dairy	9.1
Non-trawling fishery	8.6
Eggs	6.8
Starchy Roots	1.7
Wheat	1.2
Maize	1.2
Legumes	0.25

Mean land use of different foods
Food Types	Land Use (m^{2}year per 100g protein)
Lamb and Mutton	185
Beef	164
Cheese	41
Pork	11
Poultry	7.1
Eggs	5.7
Farmed Fish	3.7
Groundnuts	3.5
Peas	3.4
Tofu	2.2

The consumption of beef poses numerous threats to the natural environment. Of all agricultural products, beef requires some of the most land and water, and its production results in the greatest amount of greenhouse gas (GHG) emissions, air pollution, and water pollution. A 2021 study added up GHG emissions from the entire lifecycle, including production, transportation, and consumption, and estimated that beef contributed about 4 billion tonnes (9%) of anthropogenic greenhouse gases in 2010. Cattle populations graze around 26% of all land on Earth, not including the large agricultural fields that are used to grow cattle feed. According to FAO, "Ranching-induced deforestation is one of the main causes of loss of some unique plant and animal species in the tropical rainforests of Central and South America as well as carbon release in the atmosphere." Beef is also the primary driver of deforestation in the Amazon, with around 80% of all converted land being used to rear cattle. 91% of Amazon land deforested since 1970 has been converted to cattle ranching. 41% of global deforestation from 2001 to 2023 has been attributed to the expansion of beef production. This is due to the higher ratio of net energy of gain to net energy of maintenance where metabolizable energy intake is higher. The ratio of feed required to produce an equivalent amount of beef (live weight) has been estimated at 7:1 to 43:1, compared with about 2:1 for chicken. However, assumptions about feed quality are implicit in such generalizations. For example, production of a kilogram of beef cattle live weight may require between 4 and 5 kilograms of feed high in protein and metabolizable energy content, or more than 20 kilograms of feed of much lower quality. A simple exchange of beef to soy beans (a common feed source for cattle) in Americans' diets would, according to one estimate, result in meeting between 46 and 74 percent of the reductions needed to meet the 2020 greenhouse gas emission goals of the United States as pledged in 2009. A 2021 CSIRO trial concluded that feeding cattle a 3% diet of the seaweed Asparagopsis taxiformis could reduce the methane component of their emissions by 80%. While such feed options are still experimental, even when looking at the most widely used feeds around the globe, there is high variability in efficiency. One study found that shifting compositions of current feeds, production areas, and informed land restoration could enable greenhouse gas emissions reductions of 34–85% annually (612–1,506 MtCO2e yr−1) without increasing costs to global beef production.

Some scientists claim that the demand for beef is contributing to significant biodiversity loss as it is a significant driver of deforestation and habitat destruction; species-rich habitats, such as significant portions of the Amazon region, are being converted to agriculture for meat production. The 2019 IPBES Global Assessment Report on Biodiversity and Ecosystem Services also concurs that the beef industry plays a significant role in biodiversity loss. Around 25% to nearly 40% of global land surface is being used for livestock farming, which is mostly cattle.

=== Certifications ===
Some kinds of beef may receive special certifications or designations based on criteria including their breed (Certified Angus Beef, Certified Hereford Beef), origin (Kobe beef, Carne de Ávila, Belgian Blue), or the way the cattle are treated, fed or slaughtered (organic, grass-fed, Kosher, or Halal beef). Some countries regulate the marketing and sale of beef by observing criteria post-slaughter and classifying the observed quality of the meat.

=== Global statistics ===
Production of beef worldwide, by country in 2021

In 2018, the United States, Brazil, and China produced the most beef with 12.22 million tons, 9.9 million tons, and 6.46 million tons respectively. The top 3 beef exporting countries in 2019 were Australia (14.8% of total exports), the United States (13.4% of total exports), and Brazil (12.6% of total exports). Beef production is also important to the economies of Japan, Argentina, Uruguay, Canada, Paraguay, Mexico, Belarus and Nicaragua.

==== Top 5 cattle and beef exporting countries ====
As per 2020, Brazil was the largest beef exporter in the world followed by Australia, United States, India (Includes Carabeef only) and Argentina. Brazil, Australia, the United States and India accounted for roughly 61% of the world's beef exports.

Beef exports, including buffalo meat, in metric tons
Rank	Country	2020	% of the World	Country	2016	% of the World
1	Brazil	2,539,000	23.50	Brazil	1,850,000	19.60
2	Australia	1,476,000	13.66	India	1,850,000	19.60
3	United States	1,341,000	12.41	Australia	1,385,000	14.67
4	India	1,284,000	11.88	United States	1,120,000	11.87
5	Argentina	819,000	7.58	New Zealand	580,000	6.14

==== Top 10 cattle and beef producing countries ====
The world produced 60.57 million metric tons of beef in 2020, down 950K metric tons from the prior year. Major decline for production of beef was from India up to 510k and Australia down to 309K metric tons from the prior year.

Beef production (1000 Metric Tons CWE)
Rank	Country	2009	2010	% Chg	Country	2019	2020	Change	%Chg
1	United States	11,889	11,789	−0.8	United States	12,384	12,379	-5,000	-0.04
2	Brazil	8,935	9,300	4	Brazil	10,200	10,100	-100,000	-1
3	EU-27	7,970	7,920	−0.6	EU-27	7,878	7,810	-68,000	-0.9
4	China	5,764	5,550	−4	China	6,670	6,720	50,000	0.8
5	Argentina	3,400	2,800	−18	India	4,270	3,760	-510,000	-12
6	India	2,610	2,760	6	Argentina	3,125	3,230	105,000	3
7	Australia	2,100	2,075	−1	Australia	2,432	2,123	-309,000	-12
8	Mexico	1,700	1,735	2	Mexico	2,027	2,079	52,000	3%
9	Russia	1,285	1,260	−2	Pakistan	1,820	1,820	NIL	NIL
10	Pakistan	1,226	1,250	2	Russia	1,374	1,378	4,000	0.3

==== National cattle herds (Per 1000 Head) ====
Rank	Country	2009	2010	% Chg
1	India	57,960	58,300	0.6
2	Brazil	49,150	49,400	0.5
3	China	42,572	41,000	−4
4	United States	35,819	35,300	−1.4
5	EU	30,400	30,150	−0.8
6	Argentina	12,300	13,200	7
7	Australia	9,213	10,158	10
8	Russia	7,010	6,970	−0.6
9	Mexico	6,775	6,797	0.3
10	Colombia	5,675	5,675	0.0

==== Production losses caused by climate change ====
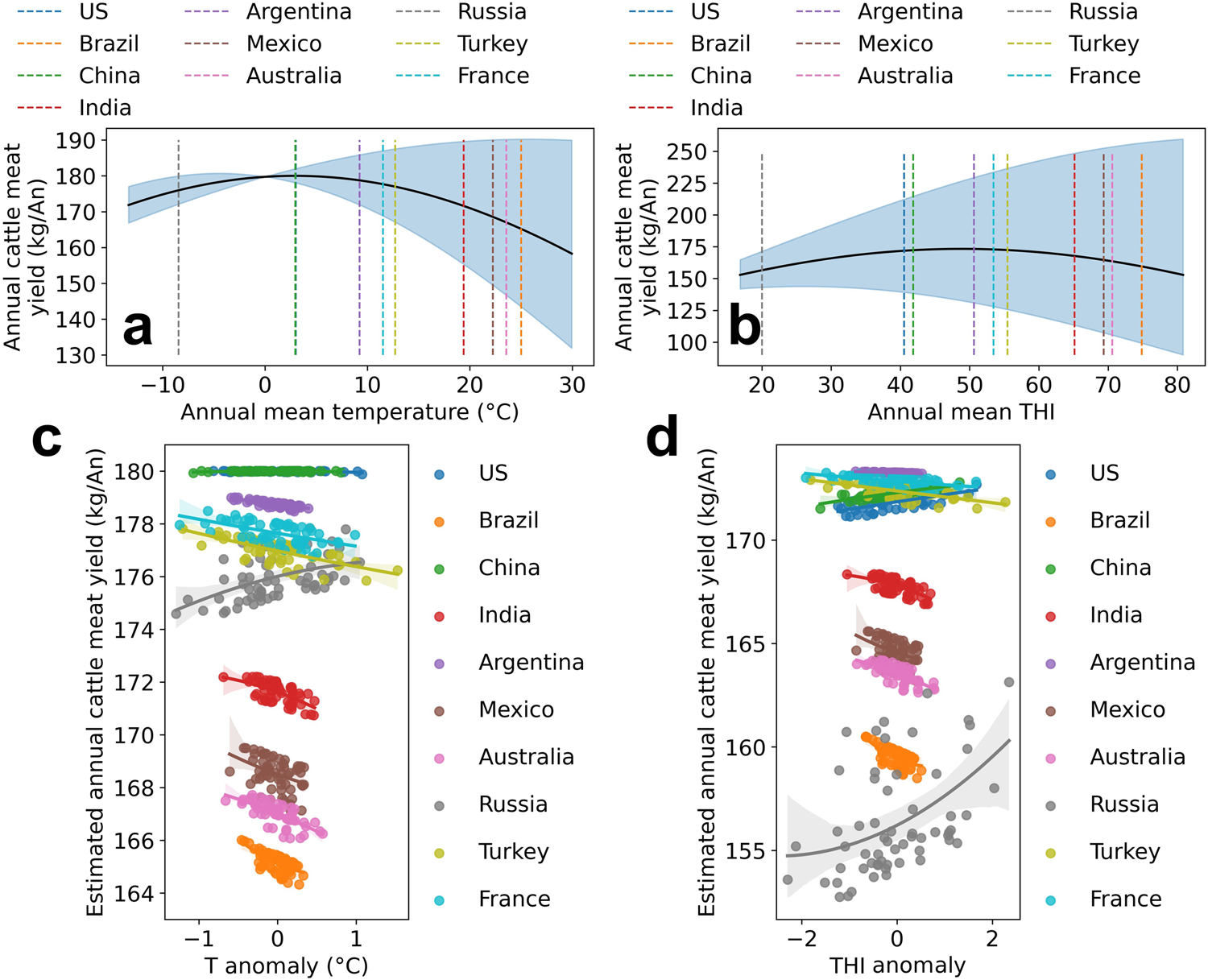
Most of the top 10 beef-producing countries are likely to see lower production with greater temperatures (left) and heat stress (right).

Heatwaves can also reduce milk yield, with particularly acute impacts if the heatwave lasts for four or more days, as at that point the cow's thermoregulation capacity is usually exhausted, and its core body temperature starts to increase. At worst, heatwaves can lead to mass mortality: in July 1995, over 4,000 cattle died in the mid-central United States heatwave. In 1999, over 5,000 cattle died during a heatwave in northeastern Nebraska. Studies suggest that Brahman cattle and its cross-breeds are more resistant to heat stress than the regular bos taurus breeds, but it is considered unlikely that even more heat-resistant cattle can be bred at a sufficient rate to keep up with the expected warming.

Both male and female cattle can have their reproduction impaired by heat stress. In males, severe heat can affect both spermatogenesis and the stored spermatozoa. It may take up to eight weeks for sperm to become viable again. In females, heat stress negatively affects conception rates as it impairs corpus luteum and thus ovarian function and oocyte quality. Even after conception, a pregnancy is less likely to be carried to term due to reduced endometrial function and uterine blood flow, leading to increased embryonic mortality and early fetal loss.

== Preparation ==
=== Cuts ===
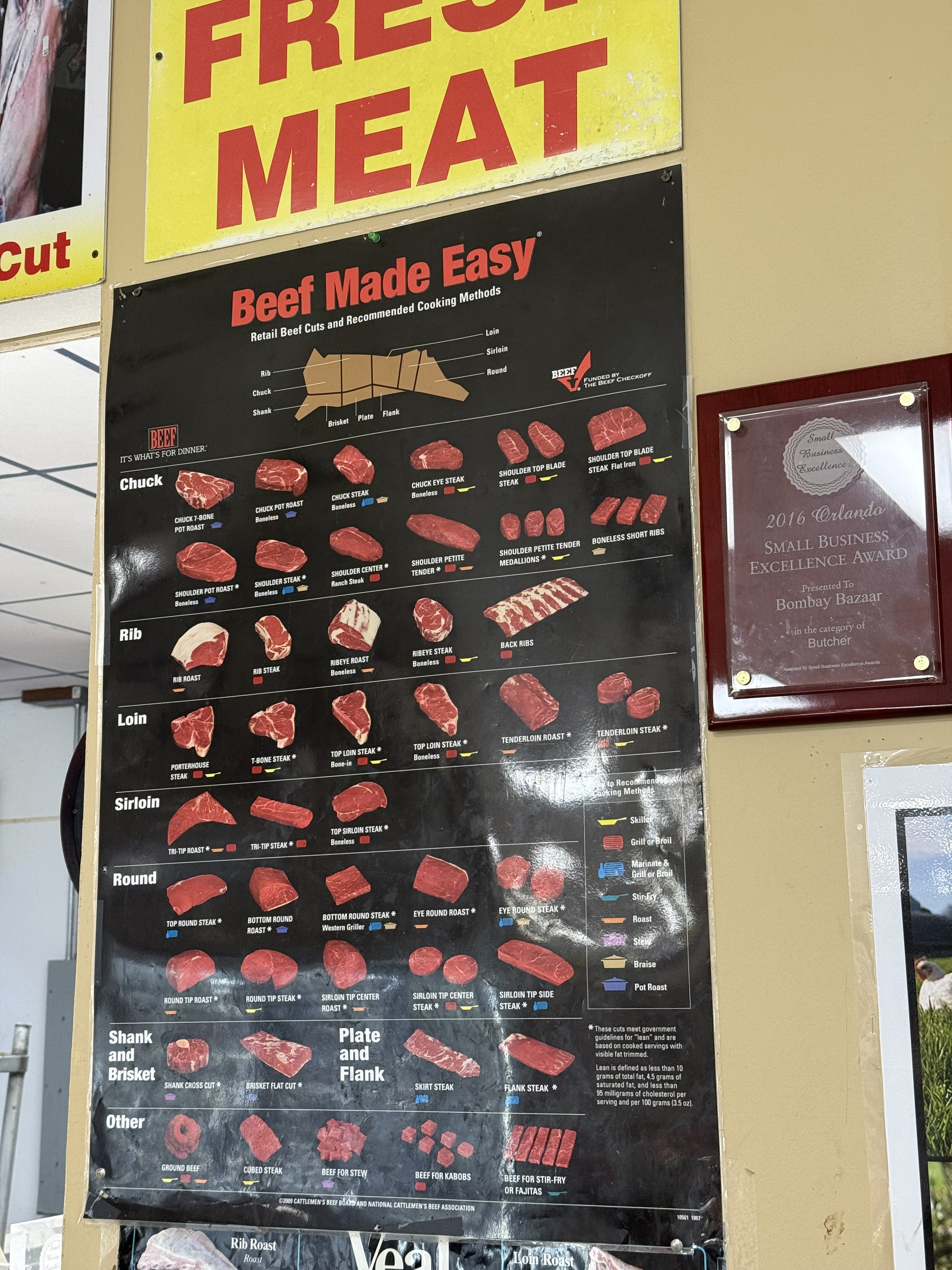
A poster at a butcher's shop denoting the various ways beef can be cut.

Most beef can be used as is by merely cutting into certain parts, such as roasts, short ribs or steak (filet mignon, sirloin steak, rump steak, rib steak, rib eye steak, hanger steak, and others), while other cuts are processed (corned beef or beef jerky). Trimmings, on the other hand, which are usually mixed with meat from older, leaner (therefore tougher) cattle, are ground, minced or used in sausages. The blood is used in some varieties called blood sausage. Other parts that are eaten include other muscles and offal, such as the oxtail, liver, tongue, tripe from the reticulum or rumen, glands (particularly the pancreas and thymus, referred to as sweetbread), the heart, the brain (although forbidden where there is a danger of bovine spongiform encephalopathy, BSE, commonly referred to as mad cow disease), the kidneys, and the tender testicles of the bull (known in the United States as calf fries, prairie oysters, or Rocky Mountain oysters). Some intestines are cooked and eaten as is, but are more often cleaned and used as natural sausage casings. The bones are used for making beef stock. Meat from younger cows (calves) is called veal. Beef from steers and heifers is similar.

Beef is first divided into primal cuts, large pieces of the animal initially separated by butchering. These are basic sections from which steaks and other subdivisions are cut. The term "primal cut" is quite different from "prime cut", used to characterize cuts considered to be of higher quality. Since the animal's legs and neck muscles do the most work, they are the toughest; the meat becomes more tender as distance from hoof and horn increases. Different countries and cuisines have different cuts and names, and sometimes use the same name for a different cut; for example, the cut described as "brisket" in the United States is from a significantly different part of the carcass than British brisket.

=== Aging and tenderization ===
To improve tenderness of beef, it is often aged (i.e., stored refrigerated) to allow endogenous proteolytic enzymes to weaken structural and myofibrillar proteins. Wet aging is accomplished using vacuum packaging to reduce spoilage and yield loss. Dry aging involves hanging primals (usually ribs or loins) in humidity-controlled coolers. Outer surfaces dry out and can support growth of molds (and spoilage bacteria, if too humid), resulting in trim and evaporative losses.

Evaporation concentrates the remaining proteins and increases flavor intensity; the molds can contribute a nut-like flavor. After two to three days there are significant effects. The majority of the tenderizing effect occurs in the first 10 days. Boxed beef, stored and distributed in vacuum packaging, is, in effect, wet aged during distribution. Premium steakhouses dry age for 21 to 28 days or wet age up to 45 days for maximum effect on flavor and tenderness.

Meat from less tender cuts or older cattle can be mechanically tenderized by forcing small, sharp blades through the cuts to disrupt the proteins. Also, solutions of exogenous proteolytic enzymes (papain, bromelin or ficin) can be applied or injected to augment the endogenous enzymes; this can be done with purified enzyme or by using a marinade including ingredients that naturally contain the enzyme (e.g. papaya for papain or pineapple for bromelin). Similarly, solutions of salt and sodium phosphates can be injected to soften and swell the myofibrillar proteins. This improves juiciness and tenderness. Salt can improve the flavor, but phosphate can contribute a soapy flavor.

=== Cooking methods ===
These methods are applicable to all types of meat and some other foodstuffs.

==== Dry heat ====
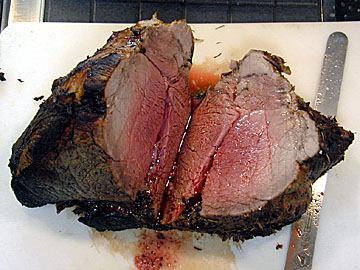
Roast beef

Method	Description
Grilling	Cooking the beef over or under a high radiant heat source, generally in excess of 340 °C (650 °F). This leads to searing of the surface of the beef, which creates a flavorsome crust. In Australia, New Zealand, the United States, Canada, the UK, Germany and The Netherlands, grilling, particularly over charcoal, is sometimes known as barbecuing, often shortened to "BBQ". When cooked over charcoal, this method can also be called charbroiling.
Smoking	A technique of cooking that involves cooking meat for long periods of time at low temperatures with smoke from a wood fire.
Broiling	A term used in North America. It is similar to grilling, but with the heat source always above the meat. Elsewhere this is considered a way of grilling.
Griddle	Meat may be cooked on a hot metal griddle. A little oil or fat may be added to inhibit sticking; the dividing line when the method becomes shallow frying is not well-defined.
Roasting	A way of cooking meat in a hot oven, producing roast beef. Liquid is not usually added; the beef may be basted by fat on the top, or by spooning hot fat from the oven pan over the top. A gravy may be made from the cooking juices, after skimming off excess fat. Roasting is suitable for thicker pieces of meat; the other methods listed are usually for steaks and similar cuts.

===== Internal temperature =====
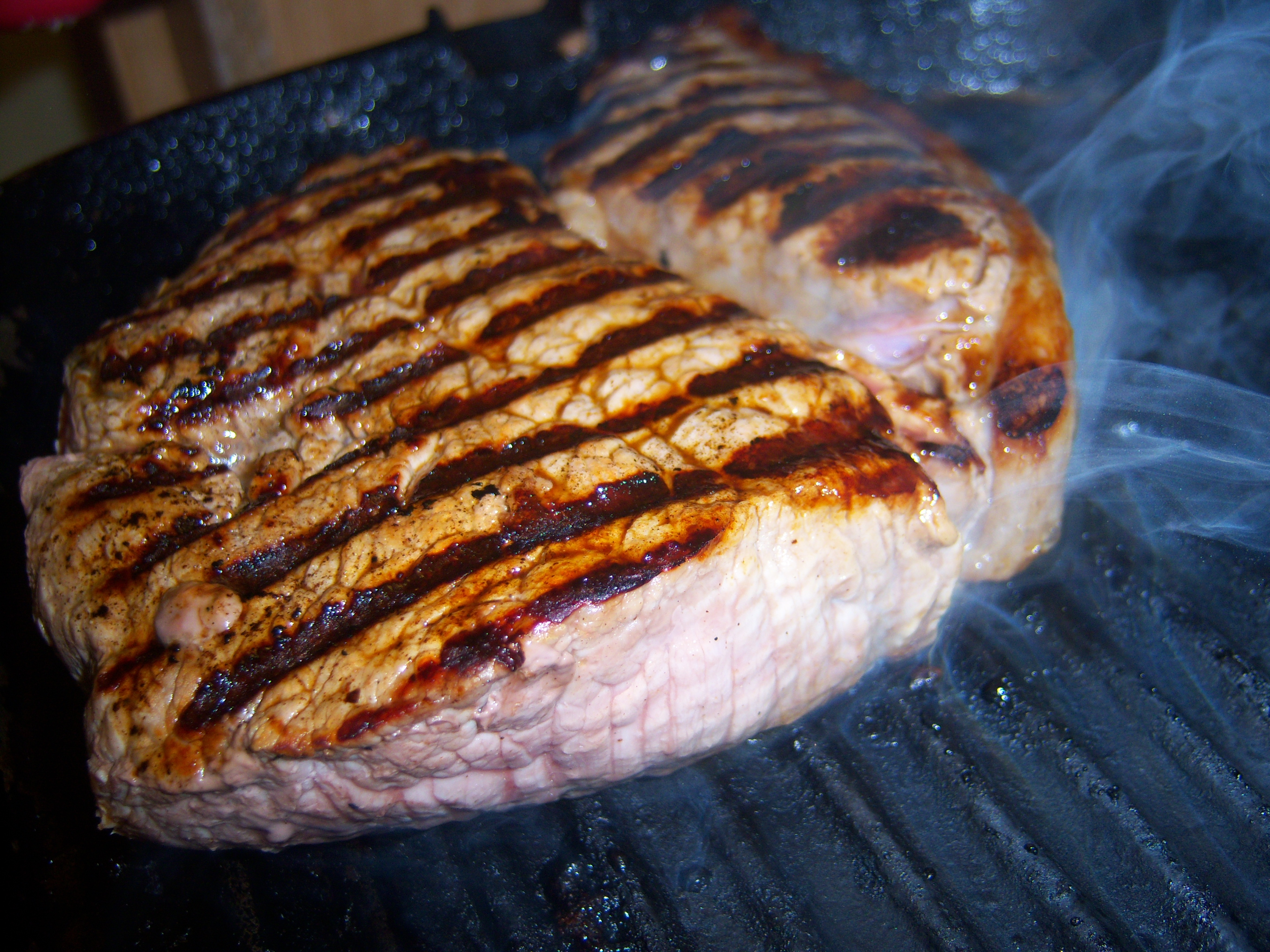
Beef rump steak on grill pan, cooked medium rare

Beef can be cooked to various degrees, from very rare to well done. The degree of cooking corresponds to the temperature in the approximate center of the meat, which can be measured with a meat thermometer. Beef can be cooked using the sous-vide method, which cooks the entire steak to the same temperature, but when cooked using a method such as broiling or roasting it is typically cooked such that it has a "bulls eye" of doneness, with the least done (coolest) at the center and the most done (warmest) at the outside.

==== Frying ====
Meat can be cooked in boiling oil, typically by shallow frying, although deep frying may be used, often for meat enrobed with breadcrumbs as in milanesas or finger steaks. Larger pieces such as steaks may be cooked this way, or meat may be cut smaller as in stir frying, typically an Asian way of cooking: cooking oil with flavorings such as garlic, ginger and onions is put in a very hot wok. Then small pieces of meat are added, followed by ingredients which cook more quickly, such as mixed vegetables. The dish is ready when the ingredients are 'just cooked'.

==== Moist heat ====
Moist heat cooking methods include braising, pot roasting, stewing and sous-vide. These techniques are often used for cuts of beef that are tougher, as these longer, lower-temperature cooking methods have time to dissolve connecting tissue which otherwise makes meat remain tough after cooking.

- Stewing or simmering

simmering meat, whole or cut into bite-size pieces, in a water-based liquid with flavorings. This technique may be used as part of pressure cooking.

- Braising

cooking meats, in a covered container, with small amounts of liquids (usually seasoned or flavored). Unlike stewing, braised meat is not fully immersed in liquid, and usually is browned before the oven step.

- Sous-vide

Sous-vide, French for "under vacuum", is a method of cooking food sealed in airtight plastic bags in a water bath for a long time—72 hours is not unknown—at an accurately determined temperature much lower than normally used for other types of cooking. The intention is to maintain the integrity of ingredients and achieve very precise control of cooking. Although water is used in the method, only moisture in or added to the food bags is in contact with the food.

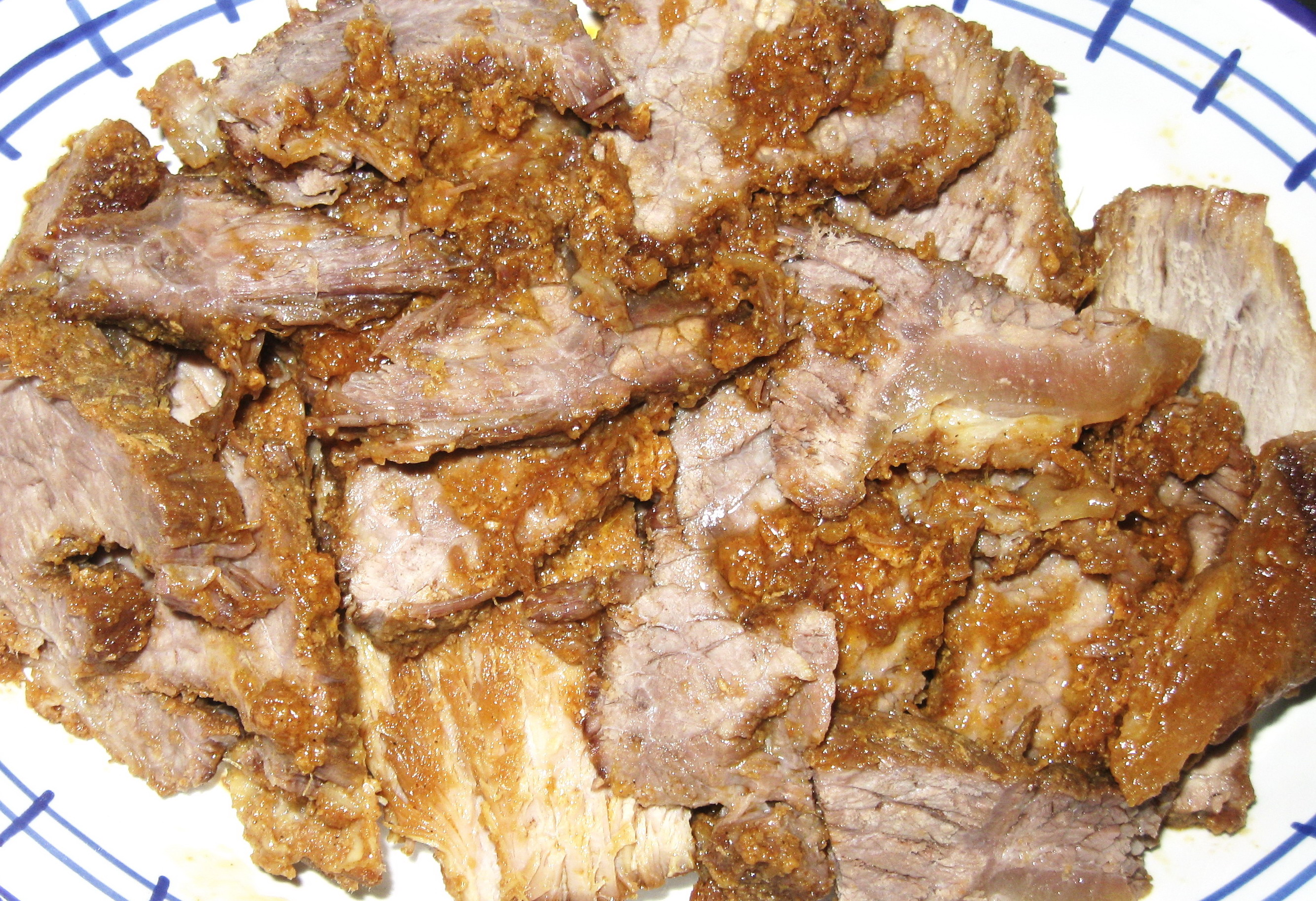
Beef roasted with vinegar and sliced with spiced paste, often called "cold beef"

Meat has usually been cooked in water which is just simmering, such as in stewing; higher temperatures make meat tougher by causing the proteins to contract. Since thermostatic temperature control became available, cooking at temperatures well below boiling, 52 °C (126 °F) (sous-vide) to 90 °C (194 °F) (slow cooking), for prolonged periods has become possible; this is just hot enough to convert the tough collagen in connective tissue into gelatin through hydrolysis, with minimal toughening.

With the adequate combination of temperature and cooking time, pathogens, such as bacteria will be killed, and pasteurization can be achieved. Because browning (Maillard reactions) can only occur at higher temperatures (above the boiling point of water), these moist techniques do not develop the flavors associated with browning. Meat will often undergo searing in a very hot pan, grilling or browning with a torch before moist cooking (though sometimes after).

Thermostatically controlled methods, such as sous-vide, can also prevent overcooking by bringing the meat to the exact degree of doneness desired, and holding it at that temperature indefinitely. The combination of precise temperature control and long cooking duration makes it possible to be assured that pasteurization has been achieved, both on the surface and the interior of even very thick cuts of meat, which can not be assured with most other cooking techniques. (Although extremely long-duration cooking can break down the texture of the meat to an undesirable degree.)

Beef can be cooked quickly at the table through several techniques. In hot pot cooking, such as shabu-shabu, very thinly sliced meat is cooked by the diners at the table by immersing it in a heated pot of water or stock with vegetables. In fondue bourguignonne, diners dip small pieces of beef into a pot of hot oil at the table. Both techniques typically feature accompanying flavorful sauces to complement the meat.

==== Raw beef ====
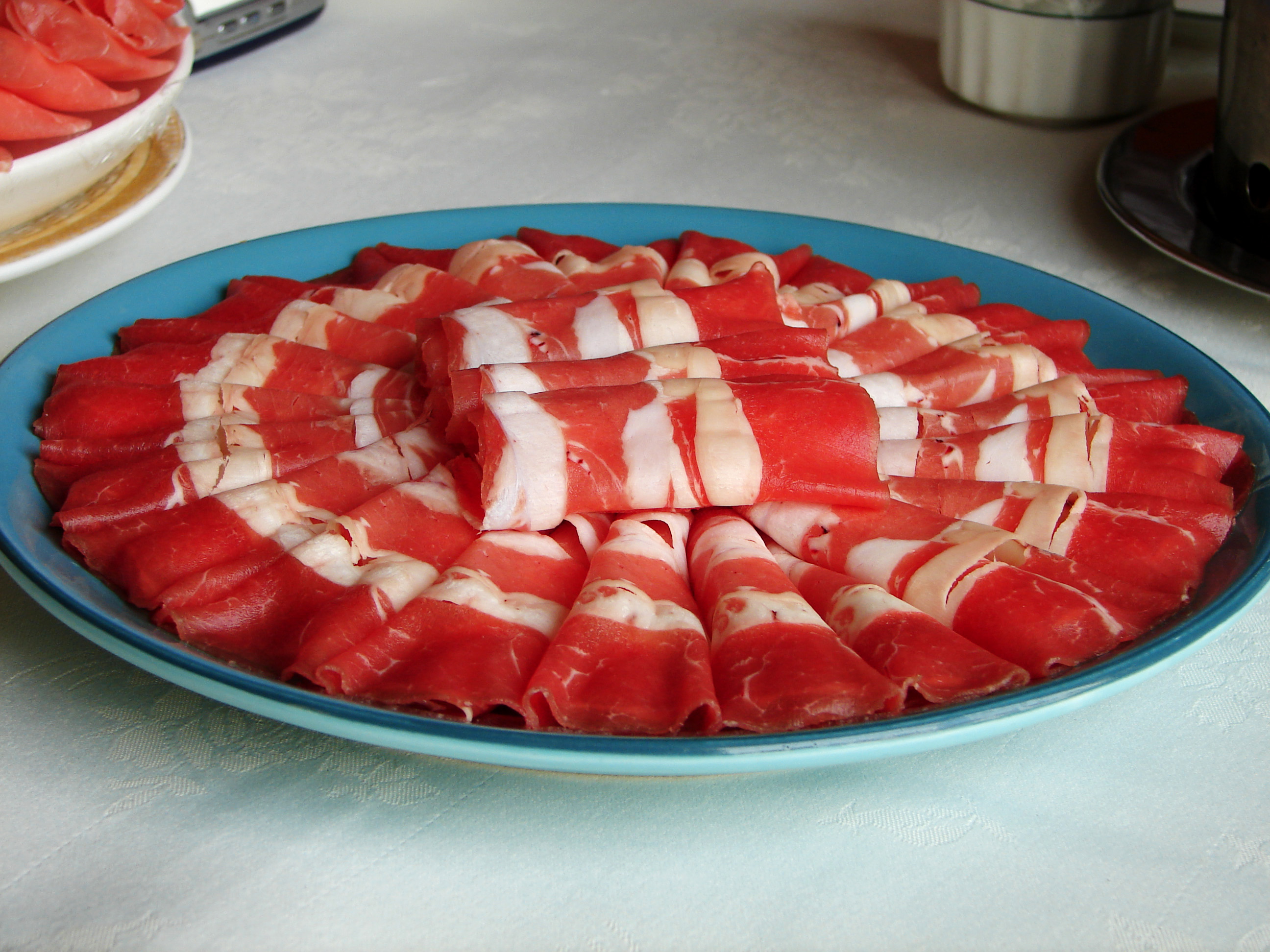
Thin slices of raw beef for hot pot cooking

Steak tartare is a French dish made from finely chopped or ground (minced) raw meat (often beef). More accurately, it is scraped so as not to let even the slightest of the sinew fat get into the scraped meat. It is often served with onions, capers, seasonings such as fresh ground pepper and Worcestershire sauce, and sometimes raw egg yolk.

The Belgian or Dutch dish filet américain is also made of finely chopped ground beef, though it is seasoned differently, and either eaten as a main dish or can be used as a dressing for a sandwich. Kibbeh nayyeh is a similar Lebanese and Syrian dish. And in Ethiopia, a ground raw meat dish called tire siga or kitfo is eaten (upon availability).

Carpaccio of beef is a thin slice of raw beef dressed with olive oil, lemon juice and seasoning. Often, the beef is partially frozen before slicing to allow very thin slices to be cut.

Yukhoe is a variety of hoe, raw dishes in Korean cuisine which is usually made from raw ground beef seasoned with various spices or sauces. The beef part used for yukhoe is tender rump steak. For the seasoning, soy sauce, sugar, salt, sesame oil, green onion, and ground garlic, sesame seed, black pepper and juice of bae (Korean pear) are used. The beef is mostly topped with the yolk of a raw egg.

==== Cured, smoked, and dried beef ====
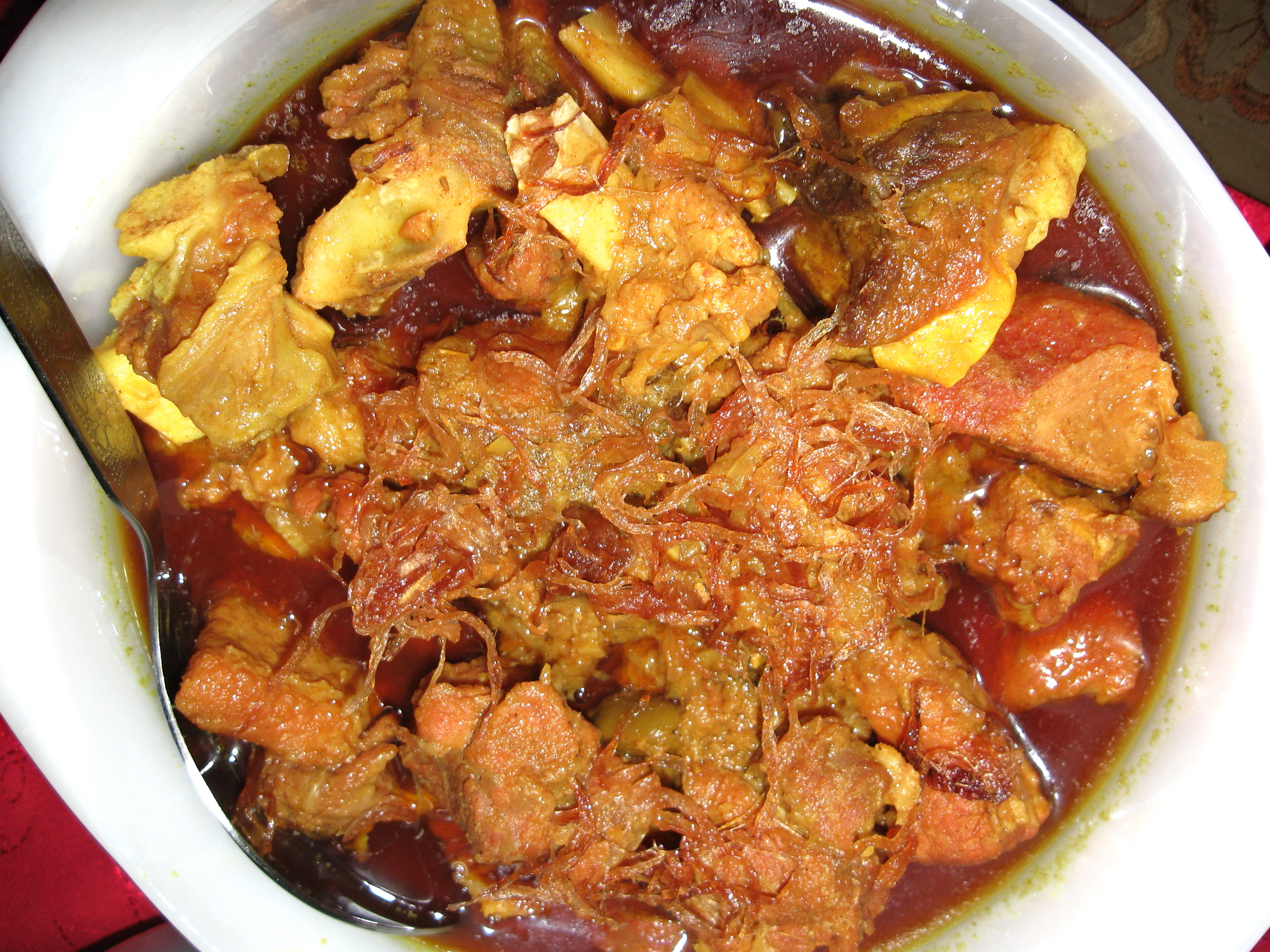
Beef curry from Bangladesh

Bresaola is an air-dried, salted beef that has been aged about two to three months until it becomes hard and a dark red, almost purple, colour. It is lean, has a sweet, musty smell and is tender. It originated in Valtellina, a valley in the Alps of northern Italy's Lombardy region. Bündnerfleisch is a similar product from neighbouring Switzerland. Chipped beef is an American industrially produced air-dried beef product, described by one of its manufacturers as being "similar to bresaola, but not as tasty."

Beef jerky is dried, salted, smoked beef popular in the United States.

Biltong is a cured, salted, air dried beef popular in South Africa.

Pastrami is often made from beef; raw beef is salted, then partly dried and seasoned with various herbs and spices, and smoked.

Corned beef is a cut of beef cured or pickled in a seasoned brine. The corn in corned beef refers to the grains of coarse salts (known as corns) used to cure it. The term corned beef can denote different styles of brine-cured beef, depending on the region. Some, like American-style corned beef, are highly seasoned and often considered delicatessen fare.

Spiced beef is a cured and salted joint of round, topside, or silverside, traditionally served at Christmas in Ireland. It is a form of salt beef, cured with spices and saltpetre, intended to be boiled or broiled in Guinness or a similar stout, and then optionally roasted for a period after. There are various other recipes for pickled beef. Sauerbraten is a German variant.

== Consumption ==
Beef is the third most widely consumed meat in the world, accounting for about 25% of meat production worldwide, after pork and poultry at 38% and 30% respectively.

=== Nutritional content ===
Ground Beef 15% fat, broiled
Nutritional value per 100 g (3.5 oz)
- Energy: 1,047 kJ (250 kcal)
- Carbohydrates: 0 g
- Starch: 0 g
- Dietary fiber: 0 g
- Fat: 15 g
- Saturated: 5.887 g
- Monounsaturated: 6.662 g
- Polyunsaturated: 0.485 g
- Protein: 26 g
Vitamins and minerals
Vitamins	Quantity %DV^{†}
Thiamine (B1)	4% 0.046 mg
Riboflavin (B2)	14% 0.176 mg
Niacin (B3)	34% 5.378 mg
Vitamin B6	23% 0.383 mg
Folate (B9)	2% 9 μg
Vitamin B12	110% 2.64 μg
Choline	15% 82.4 mg
Vitamin D	1% 7 IU
Vitamin E	3% 0.45 mg
Vitamin K	1% 1.2 μg
Minerals	Quantity %DV^{†}
Calcium	1% 18 mg
Copper	94% 0.85 mg
Iron	14% 2.6 mg
Magnesium	5% 21 mg
Manganese	1% 0.012 mg
Phosphorus	16% 198 mg
Potassium	11% 318 mg
Selenium	39% 21.6 μg
Sodium	3% 72 mg
Zinc	57% 6.31 mg
- Other constituents: Quantity
- Water: 58 g
- ^{†}Percentages estimated using US recommendations for adults, except for potassium, which is estimated based on expert recommendation from the National Academies.

Beef is a source of complete protein and it is a rich source (20% or more of the Daily Value, DV) of niacin, vitamin B12, iron and zinc. It contains high amounts of saturated fat. Red meat is the most significant dietary source of carnitine and, like any other meat (pork, fish, veal, lamb etc.), is a source of creatine. Creatine is converted to creatinine during cooking.

=== Health impact ===
==== Cancer, cardiovascular disease, and diabetes ====
According to the International Agency for Research on Cancer (IARC), unprocessed red meat probably causes cancer, particularly colorectal cancer. Studies have also linked red meat with higher risks of cardiovascular disease and type 2 diabetes.

If meat is processed, such as by salting, curing, or smoking, health risks further increase. The IARC found "convincing" evidence that processed meat causes cancer in humans. The World Cancer Research Fund recommends limiting red meat to no more than three servings per week.

A 2010 meta-analysis found that processed red meat (and all processed meat) was correlated with a higher risk of coronary heart disease, although based on studies that separated the two, this meta-analysis found that red meat intake was not associated with higher incidence of coronary heart disease. As of 2020, there is substantial evidence for a link between high consumption of processed red meat and coronary heart disease.

==== Dioxins ====
Some cattle raised in the United States feed on pastures fertilized with sewage sludge. Elevated dioxins may be present in meat from these cattle.

==== E. coli recalls ====
Ground beef has been subject to recalls in the United States, due to Escherichia coli (E. coli) contamination:

- January 2011, One Great Burger expands recall.
- February 2011, American Food Service, a Pico Rivera, Calif. establishment, is recalling approximately 1,440 kg (3,170 lb) of fresh ground beef patties and other bulk packages of ground beef products that may be contaminated with E. coli O157:H7.
- March 2011, 6,400 kg (14,000 lb) beef recalled by Creekstone Farms Premium Beef due to E. coli concerns.
- April 2011, National Beef Packaging recalled more than 27,000 kg (60,000 lb) of ground beef due to E. coli contamination.
- May 2011, Irish Hills Meat Company of Michigan, a Tipton, Mich., establishment is recalling approximately 410 kg (900 lb) of ground beef products that may be contaminated with E. coli O157:H7.
- September 2011, Tyson Fresh Meats recalled 59,500 kg (131,100 lb) of ground beef due to E. coli contamination.
- December 2011, Tyson Fresh Meats recalled 18,000 kg (40,000 lb) of ground beef due to E. coli contamination.
- January 2012, Hannaford Supermarkets recalled all ground beef with sell by dates 17 December 2011 or earlier.
- September 2012, XL Foods recalled more than 1800 products believed to be contaminated with E. coli 0157:H7. The recalled products were produced at the company's plant in Brooks, Alberta, Canada; this was the largest recall of its kind in Canadian History.

==== Mad cow disease ====
In 1984, the use of meat and bone meal in cattle feed resulted in the world's first outbreak of bovine spongiform encephalopathy (BSE or, colloquially, mad cow disease) in the United Kingdom.

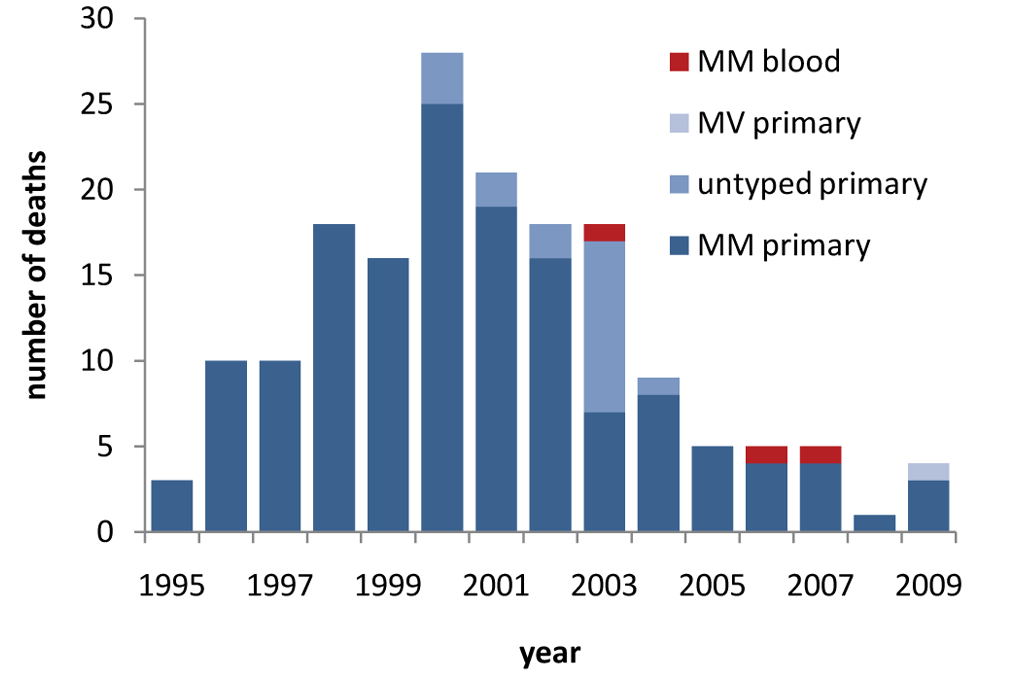
Deaths in the UK caused by vCJD from the start of the BSE outbreak up until 2009. MM and MV refer to the two genotypes of vCJD.

Since then, other countries have had outbreaks of BSE:

- In May 2003, after a cow with BSE was discovered in Alberta, Canada, the American border was closed to live Canadian cattle, but was reopened in early 2005.
- In June 2005, Dr. John Clifford, chief veterinary officer for the United States Department of Agriculture animal health inspection service, confirmed a fully domestic case of BSE in Texas. Clifford would not identify the ranch, calling that "privileged information." The 12-year-old animal was alive at the time when Oprah Winfrey raised concerns about cannibalistic feeding practices on her show which aired 16 April 1996.

In 2010, the EU, through the European Food Safety Authority (EFSA), proposed a roadmap to gradually lift the restrictions on the feed ban. In 2013, the ban on feeding mammal-based products to cattle, was amended to allow for certain milk, fish, eggs, and plant-fed farm animal products to be used.

== Restrictions ==
=== Religious and cultural prohibitions ===
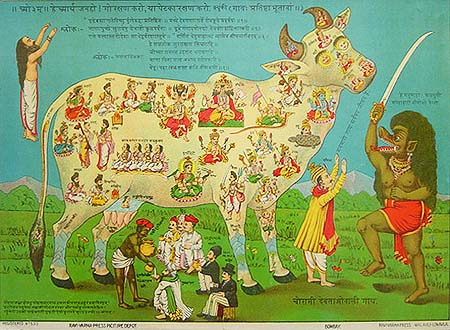
A pamphlet against the practice of cow slaughter

Most Indic religions reject the killing and eating of cows. Hinduism prohibits the consumption of cow beef, known as gomāṃsa in Sanskrit. Bovines have a sacred status in India especially the cow, due to their provision of sustenance for families. Bovines are generally considered to be integral to the landscape. However, they do not consider the cow to be a god.

Many of India's rural economies depend on cattle farming; hence they have been revered in society. Since the Vedic period, cattle, especially cows, were venerated as a source of milk, and dairy products, and their relative importance in transport services and farming like ploughing, row planting, ridging. Veneration grew with the advent of Jainism and the Gupta period. In medieval India, Maharaja Ranjit Singh issued a proclamation on stopping cow slaughter. Conflicts over cow slaughter often have sparked religious riots that have led to loss of human life and in one 1893 riot alone, more than 100 people were killed for the cause.

For religious reasons, the ancient Egyptian priests also refrained from consuming beef. Buddhists and Sikhs are also against wrongful slaughtering of animals, but they do not have a wrongful eating doctrine.

In ancient China, the killing of cattle and consumption of beef was prohibited, as they were valued for their role in agriculture. This custom is still followed by a few Chinese families across the world.

During the season of Lent, Orthodox Christians and Catholics periodically give up meat and poultry (and sometimes dairy products and eggs) as a religious act. Observant Jews and Muslims may not eat any meat or poultry which has not been slaughtered and treated in conformance with religious laws.

=== Legal prohibition ===
==== India ====
Most of the North Indian states prohibit the killing of cow and consumption of beef for religious reasons. Certain Hindu castes and sects continue to avoid beef from their diets. Article 48 of the Constitution of India mandates the state may take steps for preserving and improving the bovine breeds, and prohibit the slaughter, of cows and calves and other milch and draught cattle. Article 47 of the Constitution of India provides states must raise the level of nutrition and the standard of living and to improve public health as among its primary duties, based on this a reasonableness in slaughter of common cattle was instituted, if the animals ceased to be capable of breeding, providing milk, or serving as draught animals. The overall mismanagement of India's common cattle is dubbed in academic fields as "India's bovine burden."

In 2017, a rule against the slaughter of cattle and the eating of beef was signed into law by presidential assent as a modified version of Prevention of Cruelty to Animals Act, 1960. The original act, however, did permit the humane slaughter of animals for use as food. Existing meat export policy in India prohibits the export of beef (meat of cow, oxen and calf). Bone-in meat, a carcass, or half carcass of buffalo is also prohibited from export. Only the boneless meat of buffalo, meat of goat and sheep and birds is permitted for export. In 2017, India sought a total "beef ban" and Australian market analysts predicted that this would create market opportunities for leather traders and meat producers there and elsewhere. Their prediction estimated a twenty percent shortage of beef and a thirteen percent shortage of leather in the world market.

==== Nepal ====
The cow is the national animal of Nepal, and slaughter of cattle is prohibited by law.

==== Cuba ====
In 2003, Cuba banned cow slaughter due to severe shortage of milk and milk products. On 14 April 2021, the ban was loosened, allowing ranchers to do as they wish as long as state quotas were met and the health of the herd could be ensured.

== See also ==
- Argentine beef – Culinary ingredient
- Beef Australia – Agricultural trade fair
- Beef hormone controversy – Agricultural trade controversy
- Bovine Meat and Milk Factors – DNA molecules linked to cancer
- Buffalo meat – Meat of the water buffalo
- Carnism – Ideology that supports the use and consumption of animal products
- Environmental impact of meat production
- List of beef dishes
- List of meat animals
- Pink slime – Meat by-product
- Veal – Meat of young cattle
