= 2024 Tamil Nadu alcohol poisoning =

Mass poisoning in Tamil Nadu, India

- Map
- Date: June 20, 2024
- Location: Kallakurichi district, Tamil Nadu, India
- Type: Mass poisoning
- Cause: Methanol poisoning from hooch
- Deaths: 65
- Injuries: ~200
- Arrests: 3

The 2024 Tamil Nadu alcohol poisoning took place in Kallakurichi district in the southern Indian state of Tamil Nadu on 20 June 2024. Consumption of illegally made liquor resulted in at least 65 deaths and more than 200 injuries.

== Background ==
Illegal home-brewed liquor is consumed in various parts of India due to its cheaper price compared to the commercially available brands. These illicit liquors frequently have additional chemicals added to them such as pesticides or methanol, in order to increase potency. There had been sporadic incidents of poisoning involving illegal liquor in India in the preceding years. In 2020, at least 120 people had died from consuming illicit liquor in Punjab and, in 2022, 30 people died in Bihar and 28 died in Gujarat from similar incidents.

== Incident ==
On 20 June 2024, an incident of poisoning due to the consumption of illicit liquor occurred in Kallakurichi district in the southern Indian state of Tamil Nadu. It resulted in vomiting, stomach aches and diarrhoea due to the presence of methanol in the liquor. At least 58 people died from consumption of tainted liquor and more than 200 people were admitted to hospitals. The injured were treated at various government hospitals in the state and JIPMER in Puducherry. As of 21 June, 28 people were reported to be in critical condition. Most of those who died were economically and socially backward Dalits from Kallakurichi, and nearby villages.

== Aftermath ==
Chief minister of Tamil Nadu M. K. Stalin announced an ex gratia of ₹1 million (US$10,000) for the family of the deceased and ₹50,000 (US$520) for the injured. The Government of Tamil Nadu issued orders for the transfer of then District Collector of Kallakurichi and the appointment of a new collector. It also ordered the suspension of the Superintendent of Police and ten members of the state police's prohibition enforcement wing for negligence.

== Investigation ==
On 21 June 2024, the government appointed a one-man commission headed by former Madras High Court judge B. Gokuldas to investigate the incident. On the same day, three people were arrested in connection with the case and were incarcerated at Cuddalore Central Prison.

== Reaction ==
Governor of Tamil Nadu R. N. Ravi expressed shock over the incident and offered his condolences. Leader of opposition Edappadi K Palaniswami, Bharatiya Janata Party state president K. Annamalai and Tamilaga Vettri Kazhagam president Vijay criticised the government for the tragedy and demanded the resignation of the ministers concerned. The opposition also demanded a CBI-led inquiry of the incident.

== See also ==
- List of methanol poisoning incidents
- List of alcohol poisonings in India
