= Lakshadweep Prohibition Regulation, 1979 =

Ban on liquor and intoxicating drugs in the Union Territory of Lakshadweep

The Lakshadweep Prohibition Regulation, 1979 bans the import, export, transportation, possession and manufacture of liquor or any intoxicating drugs in the Union Territory of Lakshadweep.

== See also ==
- The Nagaland Liquor Total Prohibition Act, 1989
- Bombay Prohibition (Gujarat Amendment) 2009
- Bihar Excise (Amendment) Act, 2016
