= 2025 Istanbul alcohol poisonings =

Public health emergency in Turkey

- Date: January 1, 2025 – ongoing
- Duration: Ongoing
- Location: Istanbul and Ankara, Turkey
- Type: Alcohol poisoning
- Cause: Methanol and ethanol poisoning
- Deaths: ≥160
- Injuries: ≥230
- Arrests: 560
- Convictions: Intentional homicide

In 2025, a number of poisoning deaths related to bootleg alcohol consumption occurred in Istanbul and Ankara, Turkey. This included a surge of victims within a 72-hour period in January 2025, during which at least 30 people died. As of March 8, at least 160 people have been reported dead, and 230 others have been hospitalized, including at least 40 critically. The deaths were attributed primarily to methanol poisoning from illegally produced alcohol.

== Background ==
This incident followed several outbreaks of alcohol poisoning in Istanbul, including one in late 2024, during which 110 people were sickened after consuming tainted alcohol in Istanbul, resulting in at least 48 deaths.

The rise in bootleg alcohol production has been attributed to increased government taxes on legal alcoholic beverages. As of 2025, a liter of Raki, a traditional Turkish anise-flavored liquor, cost approximately 1,300 lira (US$27.64 as of 7/26) in legal retail outlets. This represents a significant expense when viewed relative to the nation's minimum wage, raised to 28,075 TL (US$583.42 as of 8/26).

Turkey's president, Recep Tayyip Erdoğan, amended legislation in 2013 to forbid the promotion and advertisement of alcohol products in Turkey. This has likely led to individuals turning to private alcohol producers, contributing to the severity of this incident.

== Incident ==
Starting on New Year's Day on January 1, 2025, and still ongoing in February, approximately 230 people sought medical treatment in Istanbul hospitals, with dozens of those hospitalized requiring intensive care treatment and at least 40 critically. At least 160 people were killed since the beginning of 2025, including over 17 people from Uzbekistan. The casualties were attributed to the consumption of counterfeit alcoholic beverages containing toxic substances, including methanol, a substance commonly used in illegally produced alcohol as a cheaper alternative to ethanol. Methanol poisoning can lead to severe health consequences, including liver damage, blindness, and death.

== Response ==
The severity of the poisoning outbreak prompted immediate public health responses and law enforcement intervention. Turkish authorities launched an extensive crackdown on counterfeit alcohol production and distribution. The Governor of Istanbul's office reported on several enforcement actions which included the arrest of 560 people suspected of selling counterfeit drinks, with criminal charges of "deliberate murder" filed against suspects. The government reported that 648,000 liters of illegally produced raki, vodka, gin and other sprints were seized in Turkey, including the seizure of 102 tons of methanol and ethanol in Ankara, and over 86,000 liters of bootleg alcohol in Istanbul since January 1, 2025, and the revoking of 64 business licenses for alleged involvement in counterfeit or smuggled alcohol sales. The Governor of Istanbul's office stated that it considered the illicit alcohol producers responsible for the fatalities as "no different from the terrorists who kill people."

The UK Foreign Office issued warnings to travelers in Turkey regarding the deaths, and urged them to avoid potentially suspicious drinks.

== See also ==
- List of methanol poisoning incidents
