= 2019 Assam alcohol poisonings =

Deaths from counterfeit alcohol products in India

- Date: February 2019
- Location: Golaghat and Jorhat districts in Assam
- Cause: Toxic bootleg alcohol
- Deaths: 156

In February 2019, at least 168 people died after drinking toxic bootleg alcohol in Golaghat and Jorhat districts in the Indian state of Assam. The incident occurred two weeks after 100 people died by drinking toxic alcohol in the northern states of Uttar Pradesh and Uttarakhand.

== Incident ==
The poisonings first came to attention on 21 February 2019, when 42 people died shortly after drinking the illegal alcohol. Over the following days, more people died from the poisoning and many more were admitted to local hospitals. On 24 February 2019, it was reported that a total of 144 people had died and more than 300 were admitted in hospitals making it one of the deadliest alcohol poisonings in the country. The next day, the death toll had risen to 156.

The incident occurred at tea plantations in the districts. Most of the victims were labourers in these plantations. They might have bought the liquor to drink after a day's work in the plantation.

I had bought half a liter of wine and drank it before eating. Initially, everything was normal, but after some time my head started hurting. The headache grew so much that I could not eat or sleep.

— One hospitalised worker told BBC

== Aftermath ==
Ten people have been detained for the incident.

Assam Government has announced ex-gratia of ₹ 200,000 for the dead and ₹ 50,000 to those undergoing treatment. The Government is also planning to ban and seize all illicit liquor in the state. Chief Minister Sarbananda Sonowal has ordered probe over the incident.

== See also ==
- Alcohol prohibition in India
- List of alcohol poisonings in India
