= Delhi alcohol poisonings =

The Delhi alcohol poisonings killed 199 people in Delhi on 5 November 1991 when they consumed illicit liquor. Most of them were casual labourers and rickshaw-pullers who died after consuming Karpoor Asav or sura, a so-called ayurvedic medicine. This 'Karpoor Asav' was manufactured by a firm called Karnal Pharmacy based in Ghaziabad in Uttar Pradesh. Tests confirmed that this 'Karpoor Asav' contained methyl alcohol. The Delhi Administration set up a one-Man Commission of Inquiry under the Chairmanship of Jagdish Chandra, a retired Judge of the Delhi High Court under the Commission of Inquiry Act. 1952.

== See also ==
List of alcohol poisonings in India
