= Azamgarh alcohol poisonings =

2013 mass poisoning incident

The Azamgarh alcohol poisonings resulted in the deaths of 39 people in the city of Azamgarh, in Uttar Pradesh, India, in October 2013, due to consumption of moonshine mixed with methanol. This incident is considered one of the worst alcohol poisonings in the state's history. Locals have disputed the official death toll, claiming that over 40 people died in the incident.

== Aftermath ==
At least 12 people were arrested during several police raids. Some of the victims reportedly went blind. Officials from the State's excise department, including the district excise inspector Om Prakash Singh, were suspended amidst a rising death toll.

== See also ==
- List of alcohol poisonings in India
