= Dhanbad liquor tragedy =

The Dhanbad liquor tragedy involved the deaths of 254 people in Dhanbad (then in Bihar state) of India in December 1978 after drinking tainted bootleg liquor.

== See also ==
- List of alcohol poisonings in India
