= List of alcohol poisonings in India =

This is a partial list of alcohol poisonings in India. These incidents are often – but not exclusively – associated with methanol poisoning of the victims, where toxic methyl alcohol is used as a cheap way, as compared to the proper use of ethanol, to increase the alcohol content of moonshine.

- 1978 Dhanbad liquor tragedy
- 1981 Punalur Liquor Tragedy
- 1981 Karnataka alcohol poisonings
- 1982 Vypin alcohol poisonings
- 1991 Delhi alcohol poisonings
- 1992 Odisha liquor deaths
- 2000, October 21 Kalluvathukkal Hooch Tragedy
- 2003 April 10 Kuppana Hooch Tragedy
- 2007 August 28 Avaneeswaram Alchohol Tragedy
- 2008 Karnataka-Tamil Nadu alcohol poisonings
- 2009 Gujarat alcohol poisonings
- 2011 Sangrampur methanol poisonings
- 2011 Bengal alcohol poisonings
- 2012 Odisha alcohol poisonings
- 2013 Azamgarh alcohol poisonings
- 2015 Bengal alcohol poisonings
- 2015 Mumbai alcohol poisonings
- 2016 Bihar alcohol poisonings
- 2019 Assam alcohol poisonings
- 2019 Uttar Pradesh - Uttarakhand alcohol poisoning
- 2020 Punjab alcohol poisoning
- 2022 Gujarat Toxic Liquor deaths
- 2022 Bihar alcohol poisoning
- 2024 Kallakurichi alcohol poisonings

== See also ==
- Alcohol prohibition in India
