= 2016 Bihar alcohol poisonings =

The 2016 Bihar alcohol poisonings killed 16 people on 16 August 2016 in Gopalganj town of Bihar, India. The victims had consumed hooch (spurious liquor) and complained of nausea and stomach ache.

== Background ==
A prohibition on country-made liquor was imposed in Bihar by the Nitish Kumar led state government on 1 April 2016.

== Incident ==
On the night of 15 August 2016, some people in Khajur Vani locality in Gopalganj town consumed country-made liquor (hooch) and began suffering from stomach pain and vomiting. After being rushed to hospital for treatment, five people died by late evening and overnight eight more deaths took place, raising the death toll to 13. Three people are said to have lost their vision.

Locals and family members claimed the deaths took place after these people consumed spurious liquor. However, the administration denied the deaths took place due to consuming spurious liquor with police claiming food poisoning as the cause of death.

My brother was a habitual drinker. People were in a festive mood on Independence Day, and went to drink at a place that serves illicit liquor. On Tuesday morning, they started complaining of stomach ache and nausea

— Mahesh Mahto, brother of one of the victims, Shashikant Mahto

== Aftermath ==
The administration constituted a three-member committee to probe the deaths and suspended 25 policemen including the station house officer (SHO) for dereliction of their duties in strictly enforcing the liquor ban.

The Gopalganj police suspected Nagina Pasi to be the mastermind behind the hooch tragedy. Nagina, his brother Lal Babu Choudhary, and six associates involved in the business of manufacturing illicit country made liquor were arrested on 20 August 2016.

Soon after the incident, local police dug many parts of Khajur Vani locality and recovered about 1000 liters of illegal country made liquor which was hidden underground.

== Names of victims ==
The names of the victims are Parma Mahto, Mantu Giri, Shashikant Mahto, Dinesh Mahto, Umesh, Ramji Sharma, Manoj Shah, Ramu Ram, Anil Ram, Jhamindra Mahto, Munna Kumar and Nasir Alam.

== Political reactions ==
Janata Dal (United) spokesperson Neeraj Kumar denied the Gopalganj incident was a hooch tragedy, saying, "Till medical reports and FSL reports prove that liquor was found in the body or blood, we cannot say its a hooch tragedy".

BJP legislature party leader and former deputy chief minister of Bihar, Sushil Kumar Modi said “Overall, 30 people, including the 13 in Gopalganj, have died due to consumption of spurious liquor. But the administration fudges the report, blaming the deaths on contaminated food. Only Mahadalits and the poor are suffering due to Nitish’s Taliban-like ban on liquor.”

Mangal Pandey, Bihar BJP president, called the tragedy a failure of Nitish Kumar and wondered how despite a prohibition law in place, illegal country-made liquor was being manufactured and consumed by people. He accused the administration of covering up the case and trying to prepare fake medical reports to show that deaths were not due to liquor consumption.

Another senior BJP leader Nand Kishore Yadav said, "This government has completely failed in curbing the consumption of liquor, despite imposing tough laws. The incident proves that law is just a tool to harass innocents, while others are simply defying the law. The chief minister must take moral responsibility.”

== See also ==
- Alcohol prohibition in India
- Bihar Excise (Amendment) Act, 2016
- List of alcohol poisonings in India
