= 2016 Irkutsk mass methanol poisoning =

Poisoning in Irkutsk, Siberia, Russia

- Date: December 2016
- Location: Irkutsk, Russia
- Cause: Consumption of adulterated surrogate alcohol
- Deaths: 74–78 (Note: Secondary sources have put the number of deaths at 74, 76, and 78. Supporting the 74 figure, an official forensic medical investigation seen by scientists Maria Neufeld and Jürgen Rehm found that "out of the 78 deceased, 74 died because of methanol poisoning and the rest died because of consumption of large amounts of ethanol". At least one source, an article in the Siberian Medical Journal, gave both 76 and 78.)

In December 2016, over 70 people died of methanol poisoning in the Russian city of Irkutsk. Caused by the consumption of adulterated surrogate alcohol, it was the deadliest such incident in Russia's post-Soviet history.

Russian consumption of surrogate alcohol rose rapidly in the early 2010s amid worsening economic conditions. Surrogates cost less than government-regulated vodka and were commonly available from supermarkets, small shops, and vending machines. In the Irkutsk incident, people drank hawthorn-scented bath oil with the brand name Boyaryshnik. While the product was typically made with and labeled as containing drinkable ethanol, at least one batch was made instead with a toxic amount of methanol. The resulting poisoning led to dozens of hospitalizations and deaths among residents of the Novo-Lenino neighborhood in Irkutsk. A subsequent government investigation found that the surrogate alcohol's producer sourced the methanol from an employee of a local windshield washer fluid production facility. In response to the poisoning, in mid-2017 the Russian government increased the penalties for illegally producing and selling alcohol and made it more difficult to acquire surrogate alcohols.

== Background ==
In the 2010s, the economy of Russia suffered from a financial crisis, depressed oil prices, and international sanctions put into place during the Ukrainian crisis. In Irkutsk Oblast, citizens' buying power fell between 2013 and 2017. Russians did see an increase in average salary per capita during that period, but rising prices on a number of important items—such as food, consumer goods, and housing—meant that their paychecks covered fewer essential expenses. By 2016, the number of people living below the government-established poverty line of 10,000 rubles per month (about $170 at the time) had increased by over three percent over the previous four years.

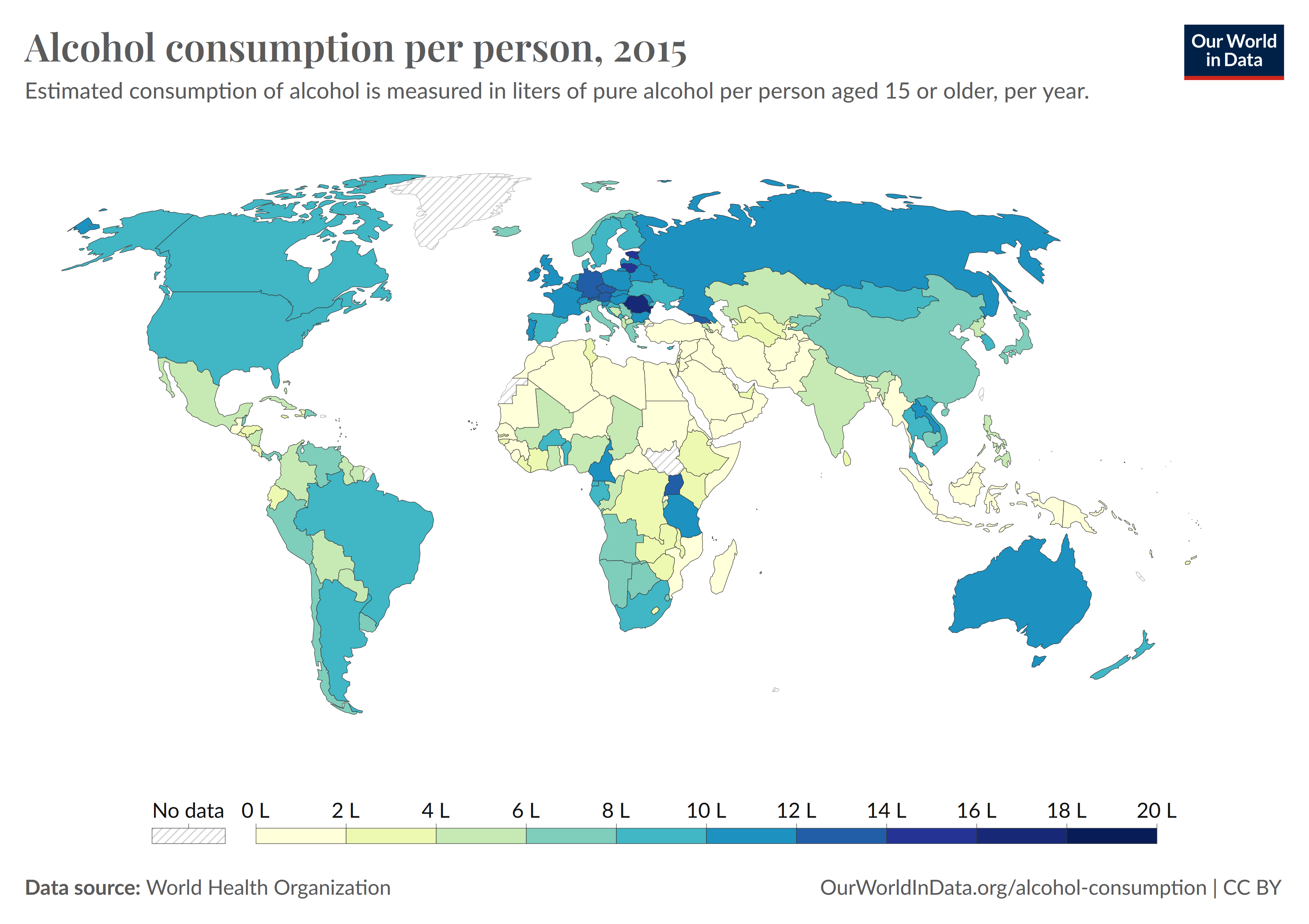
Average alcohol consumption per person in 2015 per World Health Organization data

At the same time, Russia remained one of the highest consumers of alcohol per capita in the world. According to the World Health Organization, Russian citizens consumed an estimated average of 11.7 liters (3.1 U.S. gal) per person every year (as of 2016). (Note: The World Health Organization said that their estimated consumption total covers "recorded and unrecorded alcohol per capital consumption" in individuals aged 15 or higher.) About a third of that was unrecorded alcohol, including illegal and surrogate alcohols. (Note: Experts estimated that surrogate alcohols alone made up twenty percent of the total alcohol consumed in Russia.)

Surrogate alcohols thrived because even the cheapest legal vodkas, carrying government-regulated prices, could not compete with surrogates that retailed for far less. Some surrogates cost over 90% less. As a result, more than ten million Russians routinely purchased such alcohol, and its consumption had increased by as much as 65 percent since the introduction of an alcohol excise tax in 2009. This widespread use had led to increasing amounts of alcohol poisonings, adding to a problem that was already severe in Russia.

External images
- Examples of hawthorn-scented bath oil
- Boyaryshnik, the surrogate alcohol brand involved in the poisoning, and the location where it was produced (via TASS)
- Boyaryshnik and other similar surrogate alcohols (via TASS)
- Images of Boyaryshnik and shops that sold it (via RIA Novosti)

The mass methanol poisoning in Irkutsk, a city of about 600,000 people near Lake Baikal in southern Siberia, was caused by an adulterated batch of alcoholic hawthorn-scented bath oil. It was named Boyaryshnik (Russian: «Боярышник»), the Russian word for hawthorn, and was also described as a lotion. The product shared its name with a popular hawthorn-flavored tincture, and vodka historian Alexander Nikishin told the magazine Vice that was a deliberate choice to obfuscate its intended purpose:

The name Boyaryshnik is used to hide the nature of this product. ... You can buy Boyaryshnik in a pharmacy, a medicinal tincture. And then there is the Boyaryshnik spirit, which they call medicinal, but really it's just alcohol with the taste of Boyaryshnik. It's bootlegging, pure and simple.

Boyaryshnik bottles were typically half the size of vodka, but their alcohol content was so high that individuals could dilute them to a similar alcohol by volume. They carried clear warnings that they were not intended for consumption. However, many Russians knew that the product was meant to be a cheap vodka substitute and government authorities condoned its sale.

These sorts of surrogate alcohols were widely available in Russian supermarkets, shops, and vending machines. They were also not subject to any legal age requirement, alcohol excise stamps, or other restrictions introduced in the early 2010s to curb alcohol consumption in the country. The vending machines were particularly problematic: they were highly profitable, available 24 hours a day, and often deliberately placed near impoverished areas of Russian cities to appeal to people seeking a cheap alternative to legal alcohol. Research in the Siberian city of Novosibirsk showed that many customers of surrogate alcohols like bath oil were heavy drinkers and poor.

== Methanol poisoning and its symptoms ==
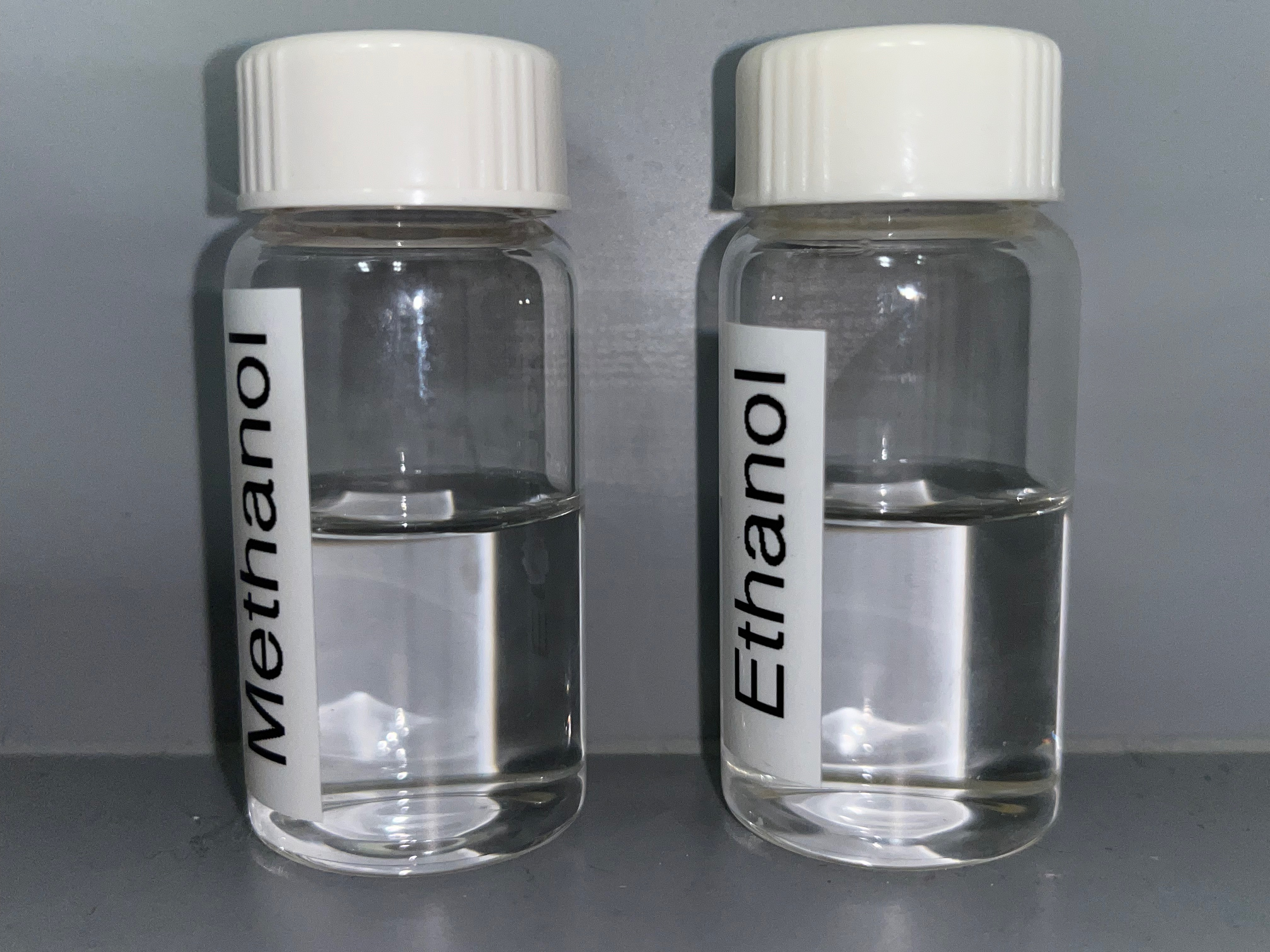
A vial of methanol, the substance that caused the mass poisoning, next to a vial of ethanol, the substance commonly called "alcohol"

Methanol is a poisonous substance. (Note: Methanol is also known as methyl alcohol or wood alcohol, and it has the chemical formula CH_{3}OH.) It is difficult to tell apart from ethanol, (Note: Ethanol is also known as ethyl alcohol or grain alcohol, and it has the chemical formula CH_{3}CH_{2}OH.) the substance found in vodka and other alcoholic drinks. Both are colorless and give off a similar odor, but methanol is cheaper.

Methanol can enter the body when drunk, when placed on the skin, or when the vapors are inhaled. Amounts as small as 10 milliliters (0.34 U.S. fl oz) can be fatal, although people have survived amounts as high as 400 milliliters (14 U.S. fl oz). (Note: According to Human Toxicology, which gives a smaller lethal range of 30–240 milliliters (1.0–8.1 U.S. fl oz), the wide difference in toxic amounts is likely because "the contamination of the consumed liquid with ethanol or later ethanol consumption, as ethanol has a protective effect". It also cites the "notoriously poor histories reported in some of these cases and the differing folate status of patients".) Symptoms occur as soon as a half hour after ingestion, and include nausea and vomiting (gastric distress) along with confusion and drowsiness (central nervous system depression). People can also fall into a coma and enter respiratory arrest. As long as 72 hours after exposure, people's vision can be negatively affected; humans break down methanol into formate metabolites, which destroy cells in the optic nerve and can leave people blind.

Common methanol antidotes include fomepizole and ethanol, but fomepizole was not approved for use in Russia, and ethanol is difficult to administer. According to government statistics, over a thousand Russian citizens were affected by methanol poisoning each year.

== Incident ==
The bath oil involved in the December 2016 mass poisoning was made with methanol instead of the usual ethanol. It was placed into bottles that had the bath oil's typical ethanol-bearing labels. The methanol was acquired from an employee of a local windshield washer fluid firm, who stole and sold the substance without the knowledge of the company's head. (Note: The company head had acquired the methanol illegally and made the windshield fluid with it in place of the legally required isopropanol. Windshield washer fluid was also a common surrogate alcohol in Russia, often being the cheapest option as well as the most dangerous.)

External images
- Poisoning survivors in intensive care (via TASS)
- The hospital where poisoned individuals were taken (via TASS)
- Additional images of the hospital (via RIA Novosti)

Methanol-poisoned individuals began arriving at hospitals on 17 December, and local press reports emerged late on 18 December with the news that eight people had died and another nine were hospitalized. By the end of the next day, a total of 57 people had been hospitalized and 49 were dead. Because numerous residents had been overcome by poisoning symptoms before being able to call for help, Irkutsk authorities searched for victims at their homes and near locations frequented by homeless people. The authorities delivered the bodies straight to a morgue.

Hospitalizations and deaths continued after the initial surge. On 20 December, the Irkutsk health ministry reported that deaths had risen to 52 with another 29 hospitalized. Those numbers rose to 62 dead plus 40 hospitalized on 21 December; 74 plus 30 on 23 December; 77 plus 16 on 27 December, and finally 78 dead on 9 January. Some people survived because they had been drinking other ethanol-based alcohol at the same time as the methanol-laced product, and the former helped counteract the latter.

A total of 123 people were hospitalized, more than half of whom died. The total number of deaths has been reported as 74, 76, and 78. An Irkutsk medical investigation gives the lowest figure, reasoning that four deaths previously attributed to methanol were caused by drinking too much unadulterated ethanol-based bath oil. Other scientific and media articles have supported death tolls of 76 or 78 people. The incident was the deadliest mass methanol poisoning in Russia's post-Soviet history. "Poisonings caused by cheap surrogate alcohol are a regular occurrence," a reporter for the Associated Press news agency wrote, "but the Irkutsk case was unprecedented in its scale."

Most of those affected were residents of the Novo-Lenino neighborhood in Irkutsk. They included teachers, nurses, and drivers; The New York Times described the majority as holding "steady if low-paying jobs". The Russian newspaper Komsomolskaya Pravda profiled a 34-year-old mother who bought the bath oil to share over a Saturday night dinner with her husband. He died the next day, while the two shots consumed by his wife kept her in a hospital until she died on Tuesday. According to state-owned media, Irkutsk's government gave 13,325 rubles to families of the dead to pay for funerals (about US$200 in 2016).

== Aftermath ==
Irkutsk's mayor Dmitry Berdnikov declared a state of emergency on 19 December. By the next day, the Russian government said that it had seized about 2,000 liters (530 U.S. gal) of illegal alcohol, uncovered a bath oil production facility, and removed 500 liters (130 U.S. gal) of remaining bath oil from the shelves of around 100 retailers in the Irkutsk area. On the 23rd, the state-owned TASS news agency reported that Russian police had seized over 10,000 small bath oil bottles.

In the days after the poisoning, Russian authorities opened a criminal case and detained 23 people. They included local vendors who sold the product, police officers, and a senior regional government official for the greater Siberian region. A further five people were arrested in January 2017 and charged with selling and publicizing surrogate alcohol. In February 2020, the last of 19 individuals jailed or fined for distributing the product was sentenced to 2.5 years in prison.

After the incident, a spokesperson for Russian president Vladimir Putin called it a "terrible tragedy". They blamed it on a failing of "supervisory bodies". Prime Minister Dmitry Medvedev called for a ban on non-traditional alcoholic liquids like bath oils, saying "it's an outrage, and we need to put an end to this". Chairman of the Federation Council Valentina Matviyenko publicly supported additional regulations on alcohol-containing liquids, and Deputy Prime Minister Alexander Khloponin proposed accomplishing something similar by requiring pharmaceutical prescriptions. Alexei Navalny, an opposition politician, alleged that "Boyaryshnik is killing more people than terrorist acts did in the whole history of Russia" each year.

Putin announced on 22 December that he supported increasing regulations on products with more than 25 percent alcohol, increasing punishments for anyone who broke alcohol manufacturing and distribution laws, and expanding the alcohol excise tax to alcohol-containing products in the pharmaceutical and cosmetics business sectors. (Note: Some media articles referred to this as a proposal to decrease alcohol taxes.) "In practice we see what such indulgences lead to: dozens of people dying like flies", Putin said.

On 26 December 2016, Rospotrebnadzor, Russia's government agency devoted to consumer protection, banned all sales of most non-food items with more than 25 percent alcohol (with exceptions for window cleaning liquids and perfume). Their order was scheduled to run for one month, but they extended it multiple times so that it was in effect nearly every day through 2018. Nevertheless, Russian companies used the exceptions and exclusions in the measure to continue selling drinkable medicinal tinctures, antiseptics, and cologne, even while they removed bath oils, some kinds of perfume, and other similar products.

In May 2017, the Russian government pegged the minimum legal price of vodka to 205 rubles per half liter (equivalent to US$3.06 for about one pint in 2016). That was lower than a previously announced price increase to 219, but it was still about 2.4 times the minimum price of vodka in 2011 and 15 rubles more than the price of vodka at the time of the Irkutsk poisoning. Two months later, they strengthened legal punishments for illegally producing and selling alcohol, banned the kind of alcoholic vending machines through which the Irkutsk bath oil was sold, and prohibited online advertisements from alcoholic retailers.

In December 2018, the government passed a new law that ended the ability of retailers to sell non-food items with an ethanol content of 28% or above at a price below that of the legal minimum for vodka and other liquors. The intended effect was to put an end to the ability of cheap surrogate alcohol to economically compete with their regulated alternatives.

According to Médecins Sans Frontières (Doctors Without Borders), a minimum of 2,601 people died in Russia as a result of methanol poisoning between 2015 and 2025. Within those, mass methanol poisonings caused by counterfeit alcohol happened again in Russia in late 2020 (7 deaths in the Sakha Republic), late 2021 (34 deaths in Orenburg Oblast), mid-2023 (16+ deaths in Ulyanovsk Oblast), and late 2025 (41 deaths in Leningrad Oblast).

== See also ==
- List of methanol poisoning incidents
