= Surrogate alcohol =

Alcohol not meant for human consumption

Surrogate alcohol is a term for any substance containing ethanol, or other alcohols, that is intentionally consumed by humans but is not meant for human consumption. Some definitions of the term also extend to illegally produced alcoholic beverages.

Consumption of such substances carries extreme health risks, both from the ethanol content and other more toxic substances that may be present. Users risk both acute poisoning from substances such as methanol, and chronic poisoning from substances such as lead.

Most people turn to these as a last resort either out of desperation, being underaged or being unable to afford consumable alcoholic beverages (with homeless alcoholics) or due to lack of access to drinking ethanol (for example with prison inmates and individuals in psychiatric wards).

== Dangers to health ==
Most surrogate alcohols have very high alcohol levels, some as high as 95%, and thus can lead to alcohol poisoning, along with other symptoms of alcohol intoxication such as vertigo, impaired coordination, balance and judgment, nausea, vomiting, blurred vision, and even long-term effects, such as heart failure, stroke, and death.

Besides alcohol, there are many other toxic substances in surrogate alcohol such as hydrogen peroxide, antiseptics, ketones, as well as alcohols other than ethanol (drinking alcohol), such as isopropanol and methanol. Methanol, and to a far lesser extent isopropanol, is poisonous. The effect of other chemicals on health has not been adequately studied, and so the health risks are unclear. However, observations in countries with high consumption of surrogate alcohols, such as Russia, indicate that the impurities in the consumed drink lead to high mortality rates. Rubbing alcohol can also cause blindness, and coma.

In December 2016, as many as 78 people died from drinking surrogate alcohol, poisoned with methanol, in the Russian city of Irkutsk.

Serious harm and even death can quickly result from ingestion due to the high alcohol content and other substances harmful to ingestion present in some brands of mouthwash. It is a common cause of death among homeless people during winter months, because a person can feel warmer after drinking it.

== See also ==
- Harm reduction § Alcohol
- Inhalant (individuals may also inhale gasoline or glue fumes)
- List of methanol poisoning incidents
