= 2008 Karnataka-Tamil Nadu alcohol poisonings =

2008 poisoning incident in India

The 2008 Karnataka-Tamil Nadu alcohol poisonings was an incident in the southern Indian states of Karnataka and Tamil Nadu in May 2008 in which 180 people reportedly died after consuming illicit liquor. This incident is considered to be the worst methanol poisoning in the country since at least 2000.

== Incident ==
On 18 May 2008, some people from the Bangalore Urban, Bangalore Rural and Kolar district in the state of Karnataka and neighbouring Krishnagiri district in the state of Tamil Nadu, consumed moonshine (illicit liquor) made with camphor and tobacco. This drink contained toxic methyl alcohol, which initially caused the death of 156 people. Of these, 56 were in urban Bangalore, 27 were in rural Bangalore, 32 were in Kolar, and 41 were in Krishnagiri. Several people were hospitalised complaining of stomach pain and vomiting. A small number lost their eyesight. The death toll later rose to 180 as hospitalised victims died. Poor people prefer illicit liquor as it is cheaper than Indian Made Foreign Liquor, which was the main reason for the incident.

== Aftermath ==
Police arrested 52 people for producing and supplying the poisonous liquor. After the tragedy, the governments of Karnataka and Tamil Nadu started an awareness campaign to encourage people not to consume illicit liquor. In Karnataka, the opposition party blamed the then-ruling coalition for the tragedy and stated that decision to ban arrack was the reason for the incident. In Tamil Nadu, some political parties demanded reintroduction of prohibition in the state. The Tamil Nadu government suspended 21 policemen for the incident. Bangalore police arrested a kingpin of the illicit liquor network, but the prime supplier committed suicide.

== See also ==
- List of alcohol poisonings in India
- List of methanol poisoning incidents
