= Ayadi =

Ayadi is a surname. Notable people with the name include:

- Abderraouf Ayadi (born 1950), Tunisian human rights activist, politician and lawyer
- Abdol Karim Ayadi (1907–1980), personal physician to Shah of Iran Mohammad Reza Pahlavi
- Boubaker Ayadi (born 1949), Tunisian author
- Ghada Ayadi (born 1992), Tunisian footballer
- Ghania Ayadi (born 2003), Algerian professional footballer
- Ghazi Ayadi (born 1996), Tunisian footballer
- Naidra Ayadi, French actress
- Samir Ayadi (1947–2008), Tunisian playwright
- Ayadi Hamrouni (born 1971), Tunisian footballer
