= Mumbai alcohol poisonings =

2015 mass poisoning in Mumbai, India

Coordinates: 28.628°N 77.278°E

The Mumbai alcohol poisonings occurred in June 2015, when at least 102 people died after drinking contaminated alcohol in the Laxmi Nagar slum in Malad, located in Mumbai, India. Another 45 people were hospitalised as a result of the incident. The incident has been described as the worst of its kind in over a decade.

== Background ==
Alcohol poisoning incidents are common in India, where poor people often cannot afford licensed liquor. In 2004, 104 people died after drinking contaminated alcohol in the Mumbai neighbourhood of Vikhroli.

== Arrests ==
By 22 June 2015, seven people had been arrested, and eight police officers were suspended for negligence, in connection with the incident. The prime suspect, Mainka Bai, a woman, was absconding as of 22 June 2015. The people arrested are believed to have transported the liquor to workers and include two women: Mamta Rathod (aged 30) and Agnes Gracy alias Aunty (aged 50). Latif Khan was arrested on 23 June for his role in the distribution of the tainted beverages.

== Cause ==
According to police, the victims suffered methanol poisoning from methanol that had been added to the liquor to increase its potency.

== Reaction ==
The government of India has announced that it will compensate the families of the victims of the incident with 100,000 rupees, the equivalent of $1,575 in US dollars.

== See also ==
- List of alcohol poisonings in India
- List of methanol poisoning incidents
