= 2019 India alcohol poisoning =

2019 alcohol poisoning incident in India

In February 2019, nearly 100 people died after drinking contaminated alcohol in two neighboring states of Uttar Pradesh and Uttarakhand in northern India.

== Background ==
Deaths from illicit liquor are common in India, where illegally manufactured alcohol is often consumed for reasons including poverty and geographic isolation. Bootleggers have been known to add methanol, a toxic substance used in antifreeze, to such brews; it can also be present because of a mistake in the distilling process. According to the latest figures from India’s National Crime Records Bureau, 1,522 people died of drinking spurious liquor in 2015 — nearly all of them men.

== Incident ==
In Uttar Pradesh, the state that reported the majority of the deaths, 36 people died in Saharanpur district and eight in Kushinagar district.

In Uttarakhand, 36 people died in Haridwar district after consuming illegal liquor served to them as part of a mourning ritual. Authorities said they believe the two incidents were linked, with mourners probably having made the journey from Uttar Pradesh to Uttarakhand to transport liquor to sell.

The All India Institute of Medical Sciences in Rishikesh, Uttarakhand, received about 93 patients of methanol poisoning over a four-day period.

The police arrested eight suspected bootleggers.

== See also ==
- List of alcohol poisonings in India
