= Sangrampur methanol poisonings =

The Sangrampur methanol poisonings occurred when a methanol-tainted batch of illegal alcohol killed 143 people at Sangrampur village in Magrahat I CD Block of Diamond Harbour subdivision in December 2011, affecting mainly manual workers of South 24 Parganas district in the Indian state of West Bengal.

== The incident ==
Victims around South 24 Parganas district started becoming sick on December 13, 2011, after drinking a home-brewed alcoholic beverage known as chepti. The drinks contained methanol, a toxic chemical that, when ingested, can lead to blindness or death from nervous system paralysis. On December 14, victims admitted to hospitals complained about stomach pain, diarrhea and breathing problems. Within 48 hours, the death toll rose to 143, and many more were in critical condition. Most who died were manual laborers and others of low socio-economic class, who bought the liquor at illegal bars called thekas. Later, the death number rose to 156 people.

== Official response ==
The Government of West Bengal paid $4,000 to the family of each victim and arrested seven people for distributing the liquor. 10 illegal liquor shops in the Diamond Harbour subdivision, one of the affected communities, were shut down by the police as well.

== See also ==
- List of alcohol poisonings in India
