= Abdol Karim Ayadi =

Iranian politician and physician

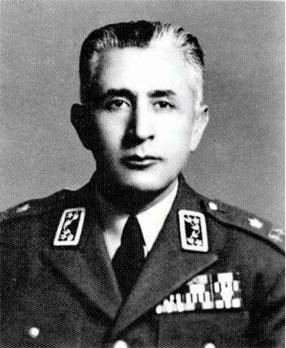

Physician to the Shah of Iran
- In office 26 September 1941 – 11 February 1979
- Monarch: Mohammad Reza Pahlavi

Personal details
- Born: 1907 Tehran, Qajar Iran
- Died: 1980 (aged 72–73) Geneva, Switzerland
- Profession: Doctor

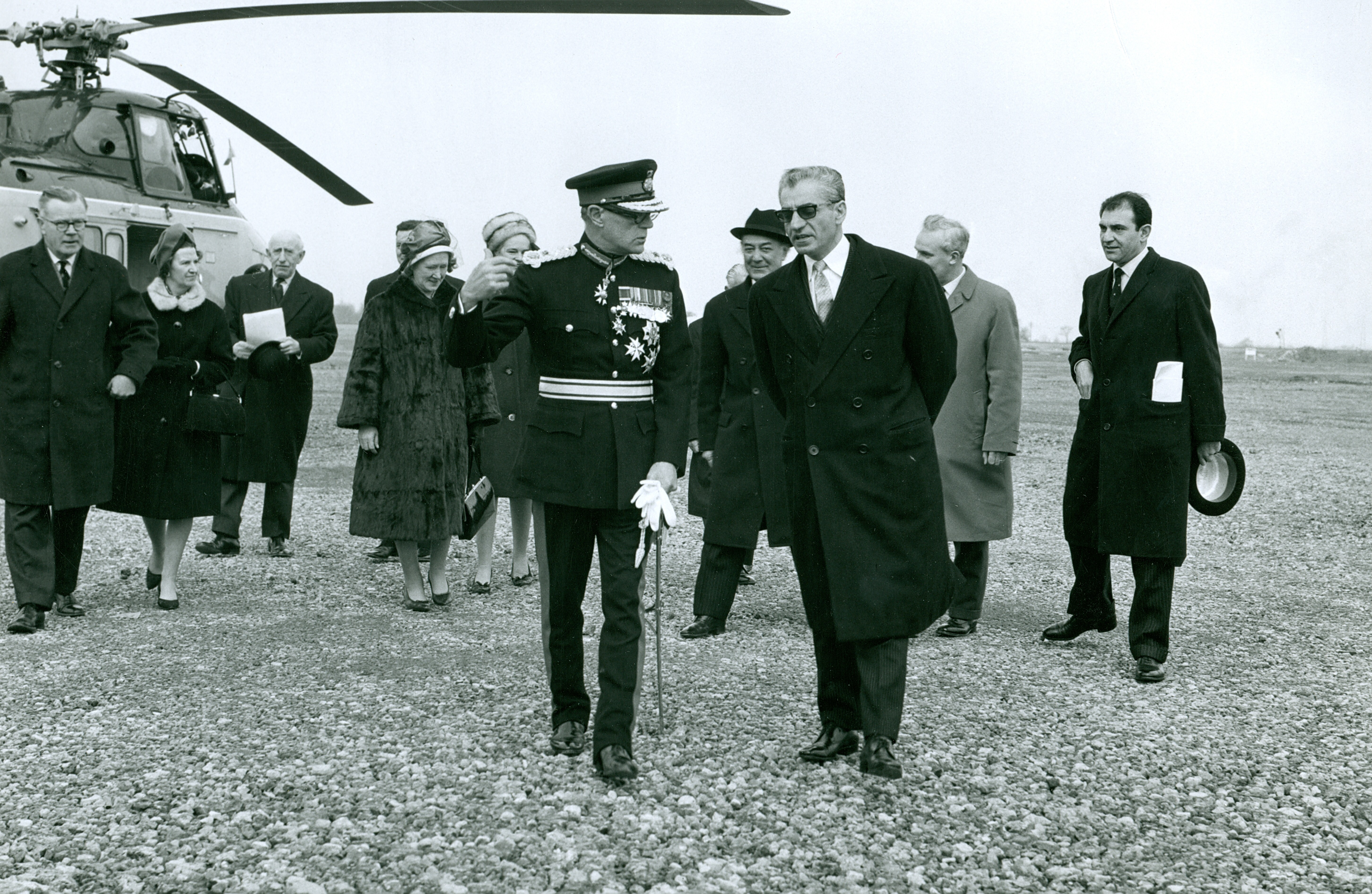
The Shah of Iran escorted by Abdol Karim Ayadi (black hat, view partially blocked by Shah) and the Lord Lieutenant of Nottinghamshire Sir Robert Laycock at West Burton Power Station in 1965

Abdol Karim Ayadi (1907–1980) was the personal physician to Mohammad Reza Pahlavi the Shah of Iran during his reign from 26 September 1941 until 11 February 1979. A member of the Baháʼí Faith, he was born in Tehran in 1907.
