= Minimum wage in Turkey =

The minimum wage in Turkey represents the gross amount that an employee must legally receive over a period of 30 days. The determination of the minimum wage is primarily based on a daily calculation, from which monthly and hourly rates are derived. Standard weekly working hours are set at 45, assuming an equal distribution across the other days of the week with only one day off, resulting in a daily working duration of 7 hours and 30 minutes.

Part-time employment involves working up to 30 hours per week, while full-time employment encompasses working hours from 30 up to 45 per week. Breaks taken on workdays are not added to the total working time. Legally mandated weekly leave of at least one day is obligatory, and the employee is compensated as if they work on their mandated leave day. The net minimum wage paid to the worker is calculated after deducting applicable taxes.

The minimum wage is a fundamental component of the labor market, representing the lowest threshold of implementation in employment practices. The current net minimum wage in Turkey is ₺28,075 per month, which was set on 1 January 2026.

== Background ==
Although the concept of a national minimum wage was introduced into Turkish legislation with the Turkish Labour Act of 1936, its implementation did not materialize until 1951. From 1951 to 1967, the minimum wage was determined by local commissions. The practice of establishing a national minimum wage determination commission, which has undergone several changes and persisted until today, began after 1967.

Until 2022, the national minimum wage in Turkey was subject to a 15% income tax based on the income tax base, as well as a 7.59% stamp duty on the gross wage. Minimum wage workers do not pay these taxes. Similar changes applied to the minimum subsistence allowance, which varied according to the employee's marital status and the number of children; this tax is also not paid by minimum wage workers.

== Law ==
The worker's hourly wage is calculated based on a monthly assumption of 30 working days. Legally, there is one mandatory paid leave day per week and a standard weekly working time of 45 hours. When the weekly working hours are distributed across the other days of the week, the daily working hours are 7 hours and 30 minutes. The pay for the leave day is seven and a half times the hourly wage; however, this is not included in the weekly working hours. The hourly wage is calculated by dividing the result of assuming 7 hours and 30 minutes of work for 30 working days by the wage.

If the regular weekly working time agreed upon between the worker and the employer is less than 45 hours (e.g., 40 hours), hours worked between this time and 45 hours are considered overtime and are compensated with a 25% hourly rate increase. Hours worked beyond the 45 hours per week are classified as overtime, and the hourly wage is paid with a 50% increase.

== Current and past rates ==
The table below lists the pre-tax (gross) and post-tax (net) amounts that a single, unmarried worker who works a standard 45-hour week should receive every 30 days.

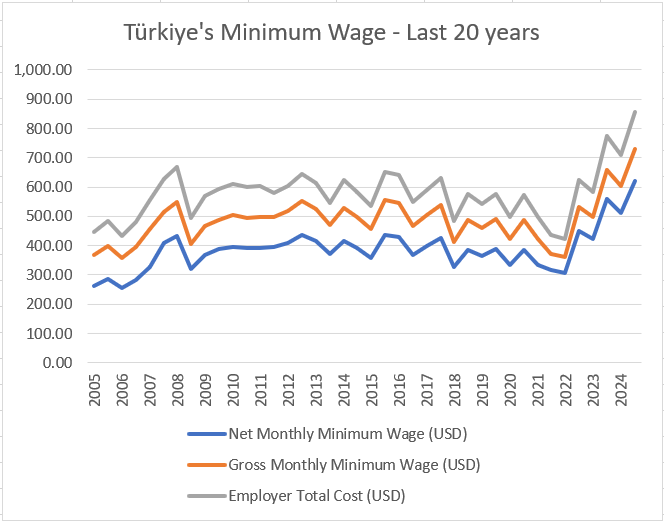
Turkey's national minimum wage rates between 2005 and 2024

Year	Gross	Net
2026	₺33,030.00	₺28,075.00
2025	₺26,005.50	₺22,104.67
2024	₺20,002.50	₺17,002.12
2023; July-December	₺13,414.50	₺11,402.32
2023; January-June	₺10,008	₺8,506.80
2022; July-December	₺6,471	₺5,500.35
2022; January-June	₺5,004	₺4,253.40
2021	₺3,577.50	₺2,825.90
2020	₺2,943	₺2,324.70
2019	₺2,558	₺2,020.59
2018	₺2,029.50	₺1,603.00
2017	₺1,777	₺1,404
2016	₺1,647	₺1,300.99
2015; July-December	₺1,273.50	₺1,000.54
2015; January-June	₺1,201.50	₺949.07
2014; July-December	₺1,136	₺891
2014; January-June	₺1,071	₺846
2013; July-December	₺1,021.50	₺804.69
2013; January-June	₺978.60	₺773.98
2012; July-December	₺940.50	₺739.80
2012; January-June	₺886.50	₺701.14
2011; July-December	₺837	₺599.21
2011; January-June	₺796.50	₺570.21
2010; July-December	₺760.50	₺544.44
2010; January-June	₺729	₺521.89
2009; July-December	₺693	₺546
2009; January-June	₺666	₺527.13
2008; July-December	₺638.70	₺546
2008; January-June	₺608.40	₺481.55

=== Statistics ===
The rates of the national minimum wage in Turkey reflects broader economic conditions. The graph highlights the impact of major financial events, such as the 2008 global economic crisis and the 2018 Turkish currency and debt crisis, both of which coincided with notable economic downturns. The upward trend beginning in 2022 warrants further analysis, as it may be influenced by factors such as inflation, government policy changes, or labor market adjustments. It remains to be seen whether this increase marks a long-term trend shift or a temporary peak that may be reversed.

== Tax deductions ==
For a non-retired worker, 14% of the gross minimum wage is deducted as the employee's share for social security contributions, and 1% for unemployment insurance contributions is also deducted as the employee's share.

=== Cost to the employer ===
For each employed worker, in addition to the gross wage, the employer pays 20.5% employer social security contributions on the gross wage and 2% employer unemployment insurance contributions. These rates may vary annually based on incentives provided by the government.

== Violations ==
Violation of the national minimum wage can occur directly or indirectly in various ways: misrepresentation of full-time employment as part-time in records and payment accordingly, failure to pay overtime wages, reclaiming a portion of the salary provided at the end of the month, and not remitting deductions to the government after paying the net minimum wage.

== Demographics and advocacy ==
According to the 2014 data from the Ministry of Labour and Social Security, out of over 12.2 million registered workers, approximately 5 million, or more than 40%, are employed at the minimum wage. According to these figures, Turkey has the highest proportion of workers earning the minimum wage among European countries. When the 9.6 million informal workers, of whom 3.5 million are categorized as "salaried or daily wage earners", are added to this group, it is believed that the percentage in Turkey exceeds 40%. However, despite requests made in the Grand National Assembly of Turkey, the government and the Social Security Institution have not disclosed the current number of workers earning the minimum wage.

In 2006, the minimum wage, which had hovered around half the level of the average wage, gradually approached the average wage until reaching its peak in 2020. The national minimum wage corresponds to 80.79% of the monthly average salary according to the Social Security Institution data, and 93% according to the Turkish Statistical Institute data.

In Turkey, decisions regarding the minimum wage are made by the Minimum Wage Determination Commission. This commission consists of representatives from workers, employers, and the government, each having one voting right. The definitive determination of the minimum wage in Turkey takes place within this commission. A simple majority vote is required for the decisions to become final, instead of unanimity.

According to a study conducted by DİSK-AR in 2017, out of the 18 decisions made by the commission in the past 18 years, 13 were obtained with the votes of employers and government representatives. Only in 3 years, unanimity was achieved along with the votes of employer representatives. Employer representatives argue that the Minimum Wage Determination Commission should adopt a unanimity rule instead of a majority vote.

== See also ==
- List of countries by minimum wage
