= Alcohol poisonings in West Bengal =

There have been at least two instances of poisonings due to consumption bootleg alcohol in West Bengal, India:

- In December 2011, 167 people died in West Bengal after consuming it.
- In September 2015, alcohol poisoning led to the deaths by methanol poisoning of 15 people in West Bengal in India.

== See also ==
- List of alcohol poisonings in India
