= Mahidharpura =

Mahidharpura Surat or Suryapur Suryapur
- Neighbourhood
- Nickname: Surajpur
- Country: India
- State: Gujarat
- District: Surat

Government
  - Body: Surat Municipal Corporation

Languages
  - Official: Gujarati, Hindi
- Time zone: UTC+5:30 (IST)
- PIN: 395003
- Telephone code: 91261-XXX-XXXX
- Vehicle registration: GJ05
- Lok Sabha constituency: Surat
- Civic agency: Surat Municipal Corporation
- Website: gujaratindia.com

Mahidharpura is an area located in Surat, Gujarat, India. It is famous for Ganesh Chaturthi, an Indian festival. During Ganesh Chaturthi, there are several different types of murti of Ganpati Bappa. Many people visit here to see different type of murtis of Ganpati Bappa and most of the people residing here(in Mahidharpura) place stalls of food, snacks, handicrafts, and many different handmade artistic things and thus it is like a fun-fair during Ganesh Chaturthi.

== See also ==
- List of tourist attractions in Surat
