= 2011 West Bengal alcohol poisonings =

The 2011 West Bengal alcohol poisonings killed 167 people in December 2011 in the eastern Indian state of West Bengal after consumption of spurious liquor mixed with methanol (methyl alcohol).

== See also ==
- Alcohol prohibition in India
- List of alcohol poisonings in India
