= Vypin alcohol poisonings =

Indian alcohol poisoning incident

The Vypin alcohol poisonings killed an estimated 77 people in 1982 in Vypin near Kochi in Indian state of Kerala. Hundreds of people, mostly fish workers and other labourers, drank liquor supplied by several Government-licensed arrack shops. The incident occurred at the time of the festival of Onam. It killed 77 people, blinded 63, crippled 15, and reduced around 650 families to penury. When victims were hospitalized, doctors identified signs of methanol poisoning.

== Popular culture ==
The incident features in 1986 Malayalam film Amma Ariyan directed by John Abraham. It is mentioned in Subhash Chandran's 2010 novel Manushyanu Oru Aamukham.

== See also ==
- List of alcohol poisonings in India
