= 1992 Odisha liquor deaths =

The 1992 Odisha liquor deaths took place in May 1992 in Cuttack, Odisha State, India. More than 200 people died after drinking illegally brewed poisonous liquor; another 600 people were hospitalised. It was one of the biggest tragedies of its kind in India.

Since the tragedy, several women's organisations in the state have demanded total prohibition on the sale and manufacture of liquor. The state government imposed a ban on alcohol in 1994; however, the Indian National Congress government that came to power in 1995 lifted prohibition on the ground that it was causing huge losses in revenue. In 2000, the police arrested liquor kingpin Surendranath Das, alias Belu, in the case. The accused was convicted in the lower court and upon appeal, Odisha High Court confirmed the life sentence awarded to Belu alias Surendra Das, the prime accused in the 1992 Cuttack hooch tragedy.

== See also ==
- List of alcohol poisonings in India
