= Nagaland Liquor Total Prohibition Act, 1989 =

The Nagaland Liquor Total Prohibition Act, 1989 is an Act of Nagaland Legislative Assembly which prohibits the possession, sale, consumption, and manufacture of liquor in the Indian state of Nagaland, as well as the import and export thereof.

The Act further bans the use or possession of denatured spirit or any material, utensil, implement, or apparatus used for manufacturing liquor. Publishing or display of advertisements for liquor or any other preparation fit for use as liquor in newspapers and periodicals is also banned.
