= 2022 Bihar alcohol poisoning =

Mass poisoning in Bihar, India

- Venue: Bihar
- Cause: poisoning from hooch
- Deaths: 73

On 14 December 2022, an alcohol poisoning took place in Bihar, India. The poisoning resulted in the death of 73 people. The victims consumed hooch (spurious liquor), that is qualitatively different from the standard alcoholic products. It is the highest death toll in Bihar, since liquor prohibition in the state in 2016.

== Background ==
In April 2016, Chief Minister Nitish Kumar enacted legislation banning the sale and consumption of alcohol in the Bihar. 21 million litres of liquor had been seized in the state till February 2022 since the prohibition. For violating the law, around 450,000 people have been arrested. Mostly, the poisoning incidents have been reported from rural areas, where denatured spirit's use has proliferated due to illegal manufacturing facilities.

== Incident ==
According to police, relatives of those who were killed claimed that the victims died due to the consumption of poisonous liquor in the Doila and Yadu Mot villages of the Saran district. The victims started vomiting after consuming the alcohol with people dying on the way to hospital. Many others died while being treated in hospital later. The tragedy took the lives of 73 people in total. Most of the victims were declared dead on arrival at a hospital in Chhapra. Many of the victims did not seek help initially because they feared being punished for their violation of the liquor prohibition.

== Response ==
Chief Minister Nitish Kumar said that those who drink alcohol will die and no compensation will be given to the families of the deceased. Pointing out that Bihar is a state where alcohol prohibition has been in place since 2016, the Chief Minister asked people to be more cautious in this regard. The opposition, including the Bharatiya Janata Party, protested against Nitish Kumar's stand in the assembly. Nitish Kumar declined to repeal the liquor ban, citing women's rights concerns.
