= Bihar Excise (Amendment) Act, 2016 =

Bihar Legislative Assembly
- Territorial extent: Bihar
- Enacted by: Bihar Legislative Assembly
- Status: In force

Bihar Excise (Amendment) Act, 2016 is an Act of Bihar Legislative Assembly which prohibits manufacturing, bottling, distribution, transportation, accumulation, possession, purchase, sale or consumption of any type of liquor, intoxicating substance including bhang and medicines with alcoholic substance. The Act prescribes stringent punishment including capital punishment to those manufacturing or trading illicit liquor.

On 30 September 2016, the Patna High Court struck down the Act, deeming it 'illegal'.

== See also ==
- 2016 Bihar hooch tragedy
