= Antiquity (whisky) =

Brand of Indian Whisky

- Type: Indian whisky
- Manufacturer: United Spirits Ltd (USL) (Diageo)
- Origin: India
- Introduced: 1992
- Alcohol by volume: 42.8%
- Ingredients: Indian grain spirits, Indian malt, Scotch malt
- Variants: Antiquity Blue; Antiquity Rare
- Related products: Bagpiper; McDowell's No.1; Director's Special; DSP Black; Royal Challenge; Signature
- Website: unitedspirits.in/antiquity-blue-whisky.aspx

Antiquity is a brand of Indian whisky, manufactured by United Spirits Ltd (USL), a subsidiary of Diageo. It was launched in 1992 and is available in two variants – Antiquity Blue and Antiquity Rare.

== Brand expressions ==
The Antiquity brand is available in two variants – Antiquity Blue and Antiquity Rare.

Antiquity Blue is made of Indian and Scotch malt whisky blended with grain spirit. Antiquity Blue was awarded "Silver Best in Class" in the Spirits Tasting competition by the 2012 International Wine and Spirit Competition at the Wine and Spirits Wholesalers of America (WSWA) Conference.

In a taste test of "India's 5 cheapest whiskeys" by GQ magazine, Antiquity Rare received a rating of 4.2/10. The magazine said that the whisky had "won few admirers among the judges, with complaints of a perfumed, nearly acetone taste – except for one diehard fan".

== History ==
Antiquity was launched in 1992 by Shaw Wallace. United Spirits Ltd (USL), a subsidiary of the United Breweries Group (UB Group), acquired Shaw Wallace in July 2005. On 1 April 2008, Shaw Wallace was merged with USL and Antiquity officially became a USL brand.

In April 2008, the UB Group appointed London-based design firm Claessens International to revamp the packaging of Antiquity. The primary reason behind the revamp was to retain the heritage character and incorporation of the Shaw Wallace name on the bottles of the brand that was formerly owned by SWC.

Antiquity was introduced in the United States by American United Beer & Spirits (UBS) at the Wine and Spirits Wholesalers of America (WSWA) Conference, held in Las Vegas from April 2 to 5, 2012. Antiquity Blue Rare Premium was launched in China on 11 May 2007, which at the time was the most expensive Indian made whisky.

== Market presence ==
The brand's main national competitors are Blenders Pride from Pernod Ricard and Peter Scot from Khoday India Limited, as well as competition from other USL whiskies in the same price range such as Royal Challenge and Signature. In some states, Antiquity also competes with Haig Gold Label from Diageo and Rockford Reserve from Modi Illva.

Antiquity Rare Premium whisky saw 50% growth in sales for the year-ended 30 June 1998, over 1996-97. The brand held a market share of 44% in the premium whisky segment of the Indian market, with another USL (then SWC) brand Royal Challenge grabbing 49% of market share. Antiquity and Seagram's Blenders Pride were the highest selling whisky brands in the super-premium Indian Made Foreign Liquor (IMFL) category in 2002-03. On 2 February 2005, Shaw Wallace stated that Antiquity Rare Premium whisky had a growth in sales of 40% over the previous year.

== Brand ambassadors ==
In April/May 2012, American United Beer & Spirits signed Indian model and television personality Nina Manuel to represent Antiquity whisky in the US.

== See also ==
- List of whisky brands
