= Director's Special (whisky) =

Brand of Indian whisky

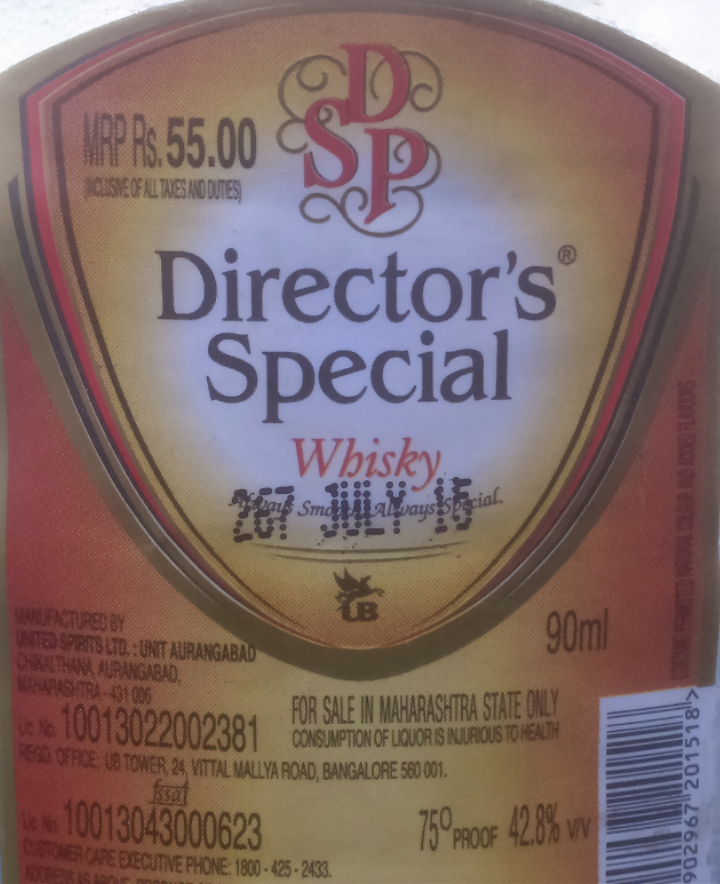
- Type: Indian whisky
- Manufacturer: United Spirits Ltd (USL)
- Origin: India
- Alcohol by volume: 42.8%
- Related products: 100 Pipers; Bagpiper; Black Dog; McDowell's No.1; DSP Black; Royal Challenge; Signature; Antiquity

Director's Special, commonly referred to by its abbreviation DSP, is a brand of Indian whisky, manufactured by United Spirits Ltd (USL). It is molasses based. Shaw Wallace won a legal battle in US courts against the Scotch Whisky Association (SWA) to sell the product as "whisky".

== History ==
DSP was originally manufactured by Shaw Wallace.

United Spirits Ltd (USL), a subsidiary of the United Breweries Group (UB Group), acquired Shaw Wallace in July 2005. On 1 April 2008, Shaw Wallace was merged with USL and DSP officially became a USL brand. In April 2008, the UB Group appointed London-based design firm Claessens International to create new packaging.

== DSP Black ==
DSP Black, expanded to Director's Special Black, is an extension of the Director's Special brand into the deluxe whisky segment of the Indian market. It was launched in 1988 by Shaw Wallace.

== Sales ==
The following table shows the annual sales of Director's Special and DSP Black:

Year	Sales (in million cases)	
Year	DSP	DSP Black
2001-02	3	
2006	3.8	0.9
2007	3.7	1.3
2008	4	1.8
2009	4.4	2
2010	4.5	2.9
2011	4.5	2.9
2012	4.3	2.9

== See also ==
- List of Indian beverages
