= Royal Stag =

Brand of Indian whisky

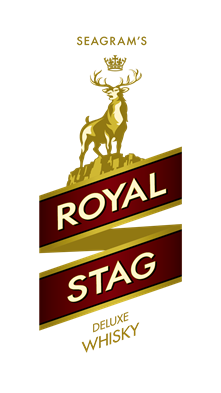
- Type: Whisky
- Manufacturer: Pernod Ricard
- Distributor: Pernod Ricard
- Origin: India
- Introduced: 1995
- Alcohol by volume: 42.8% in most countries
- Colour: Whisky, Golden
- Flavour: Aroma: Leafy [like cut grass], woody fruity [tropical fruit] with a touch of smoke [like burnt wood]; Taste: Medium bodied, rounded; Mouth feel: Smooth with a touch of smoke
- Ingredients: Scotch malts blended with grain spirits
- Variants: Royal Stag; Royal Stag Barrel Select
- Related products: Royal Challenge; Seagram's Imperial Blue; Seagram's Blenders Pride; Chivas Regal; Seagram's 100 Pipers
- Website: Pernod-Ricard.com/Royal-Stag

Royal Stag, also known as Seagram's Royal Stag, is an Indian whisky launched in 1995. It is available in many countries across the world in various pack sizes. It is Pernod Ricard's best selling brand by volume. It is a blend of grain spirits and imported Scotch malts. It is commonly available in 180 mL bottles. The brand is named after a species of deer famous for its antlers, that is also featured in its logo. It is produced in several company-owned as well as bottler-owned distilleries. It was the first whisky brand launched in India that did not use any artificial flavours.

Pernod Ricard has identified Royal Stag along with Seagram's Imperial Blue, Seagram's Blenders Pride, Chivas Regal and Seagram's 180 Pipers as the company's five core brands to build its spirits business in India. Royal Stag sold 12.3 million cases in 2011, toppling Absolut Vodka, to become Pernod Ricard's biggest selling brand in its global portfolio of alcoholic beverages. Royal Stag sold 18 million cases in 2016.

== History ==
Seagram's Royal Stag whisky, a blend of grain spirits and imported Scotch malts, was launched in 1995. The brand redefined the spirits space by not using molasses but choosing instead to pioneer grain spirit blended with Scotch malts. It is named after a deer species known for long antlers. It is the first whisky brand launched in India which did not use any artificial flavour. Seagram's global business was jointly acquired by Pernod Ricard and Diageo in December 2000. The two companies later split Seagram's business based on the previously announced framework agreement signed between them and Royal Stag became a Pernod Ricard brand.

In calendar year 2001, Royal Stag was selling over 125,000 cases per month and sold approximately 1.75 million cases in 2002. The brand's annualised sales during the 2004 calendar year crossed 3 million cases, and increased to nearly 4 million cases in 2006. Royal Stag was ranked second among Indian spirits brands in Impact International's 2008 list of "Top 100 Brands at Retail Value" with a retail value of US$505 million. The brand reported sales of 8 million cases in 2009 and nearly 10.6 million cases in 2010.

Royal Stag sold 12.3 million cases in 2011, toppling Absolut Vodka which sold 11.3 million cases, to become Pernod Ricard's biggest selling brand in its global portfolio of alcoholic beverages.

Pernod Ricard launched a premium version of Royal Stag, called Royal Stag Barrel Select in December 2011 in India, Gulf and a few other Asian markets. In the Indian whisky market, Barrel Select is positioned between the deluxe and premium segment occupied by the company's Royal Stag and Blenders Pride brands respectively. United Kingdom-based branding and packaging consultants CARTILS developed the strategic positioning, branding, bottle shape, packaging and mono carton for Barrel Select. CARTILS felt it was necessary to retain brand familiarity whilst elevating Barrel Select to a more premium level than Royal Stag, to avoid portfolio cannibalisation. The Barrel Select bottle has rectangular shape similar to Royal Stag, but it has been tapered. The bottle also features a dominantly positioned, gold two-tone illustration of the stag that is part of the Royal Stag logo.

== Marketing ==
Royal Stag is placed in the deluxe segment of the Indian whisky market and is priced to target the upper middle class aged 25–40 years. The brand's main national competitor, at its price point, is United Spirits Ltd's McDowell's No.1 whisky. Royal Stag also faces competition from Radico Khaitan's 8 PM Royale, Mason & Summers' "Royal Crown", United Spirits Ltd's Royal Mist whiskies and Allied Blenders & Distilleries (ABD)'s Officer's Choice Black. Pernod Ricard has identified Royal Stag along with Imperial Blue, Blenders Pride, Chivas Regal and 100 Pipers as the company's five core brands to build its spirits business in India. 5 brands have been divided in 2 categories, Chivas Regal and 100 Pipers come under "lifestyle business " category while the other brands, including Royal Stag, are designated as India-made foreign liquor (IMFL). It is marketed in 1 L, 750 ml, 375 ml and 180 ml bottles and also available in 90 ml and 60 ml bottles. The Price for Royal Stag in India vary.

Advertising alcoholic beverages is banned in India as per the Cable Television Network (Regulation) Amendment Bill, which came into effect on 8 September 2000. To circumvent the ban liquor manufacturers use surrogate advertising or develop associate properties. Royal Stag uses three themes – Mega Movie, Mega Music and Mega Cricket – to promote the brand. According to Seagram India's vice-president of marketing Bikram Basu, "We've developed Royal Stag Mega Cricket and Royal Stag Mega Movies to promote the brand". Mega Cricket sells cricket gear, and sponsors cricket events, and Basu claims that Mega Movies sponsors "around 8–10 national releases of Hollywood movies every year." The brand often uses cricketers and Bollywood stars in its advertising. The brand's slogan is: "It's your life, make it large".

In 2006, a Royal Stag advert featuring Harbhajan Singh without his turban, with his hair tumbling down over his shoulders, outraged orthodox Sikhs, who burnt effigies in the city of Amritsar. Sikh clergy and its representative body, the Shiromani Gurdwara Parbandhak Committee (SGPC) demanded an apology from Singh and demanded that Pernod Ricard India withdraw the ad, which the SGPC termed, an "offensive representation which has hurt the feelings of Sikhs." Singh later apologised saying, "I apologise. In case I have hurt the feelings of my people, it was really not my intention."

A Royal Stag ad in 2011 featuring Harbhajan Singh, showed him opting to not work in his father's ball bearing factory and focus on cricket instead. The commercial ends with him asking the viewer, if with his achievements, "Have I made it large?" Royal Stag's rival, United Spirits Ltd's McDowell's No. 1 Platinum whisky mocked the ad in its commercial featuring Mahendra Singh Dhoni. The ad showed Harbhajan look-alike making ball bearings the size of gym balls at his father's factory, asking if he had "made it large", only to get slapped by his father for being incompetent. Dhoni then tells the viewer, "Zindagi main kuch karna hai to large chodo, kuch alag karo yaar" (If you want to do something in life, then forget large, do something different yaar). The ad is considered to be a rare example of a spoof in surrogate advertising. The Economic Times quoted an industry official as saying, "It is in bad taste, this type of advertising has never been used in the Indian liquor industry." Harbhajan served a legal notice to United Spirits Ltd on 18 July 2011 claiming that the commercial mocked him, his family and the Sikh community. The notice was sent to Vijay Mallya, UB Executive vice-chairman SR Gupte, President & CFO Ravi Nedungadi, Deputy President Harish Bhat and Executive VP (Corporate Affairs) Nandini Verma. It was sent by Avtar Kaur, Harbhajan's mother, through his lawyers, Dewani Advocates & Consultants. Kaur stated these kinds of advertisements brought "disunity and friction" in the Indian cricket team and could be termed "anti-national". The notice also demanded that the company publicly apologise to the family "through widely-read newspapers as well as television channels prominently", remove the advertisement within three days of receiving the notice and compensation of ₹100,000 (US$1,000). The United Breweries Group withdrew the ad on 22 July 2011 stating that had done so "in the interest of the game of cricket" and fearing that the commercial could be "misused by vested interests to further their own agenda". The company also stated that the view of the management was that there was no maintainable case.

=== Brand ambassadors ===
In 2002, Seagram signed eight cricketers to endorse Royal Stag, including Harbhajan Singh (India), Marvan Atapattu (Sri Lanka), Wasim Akram (Pakistan), Glenn McGrath (Australia), Jonty Rhodes (South Africa), Mervyn Dillon (West Indies), Stephen Fleming (New Zealand), and Andy Flower (Zimbabwe). The campaign was handled by Ogilvy & Mather. Seagram spent ₹2.5 crore (US$260,000) on this promotion. Following this contract, in 2004, Pakistan Civil Court ruled that Wasim Akram had hurt sentiments of Muslims and was fined 25,000 Pakistani rupees (£238) and ordered to apologize the nation. While Akram's lawyer maintained stand that Akram had never appeared in any advertisement of alcoholic product.

Other cricketers that have featured as brand ambassadors or have appeared in Royal Stag advertising include Gautam Gambhir, Jonty Rhodes, Mahendra Singh Dhoni, Ricky Ponting and Yuvraj Singh.

The brand's first TV commercial with Saif Ali Khan as brand ambassador, aired in 2007. The campaign was developed by creative agency Ogilvy & Mather. It also featured cricketers Mahendra Singh Dhoni, Yuvraj Singh, Harbhajan Singh and Robin Uthappa. According to Bikram Basu, vice-president, marketing, Seagram India, "The TVC [television commercial] intends to further strengthen the brand's positioning of "Make it Large". The campaign defines the larger than life attitude associated with Royal Stag. It targets the party loving youth of the country, who aspire to make it large in every aspect of their lives and communicates the brand message in a truly fast-paced and international way."

On 10 February 2010, Pernod Ricard India announced that it had signed Shahrukh Khan, for an undisclosed amount, as the brand ambassador for Royal Stag, for a period of one year. The company said that Shahrukh would work in tandem with Saif Ali Khan, who has been the brand ambassador since 2007. In April 2013, social activist T Satish Kumar and student leader Banoth Amru Naik, from the Nalgonda district of Andhra Pradesh, filed a complaint with the State Human Rights Commission (SHRC) against Telugu film actor Mahesh Babu for endorsing Royal Stag. The annulment of the agreement would result in Sri Lanka Cricket losing its rights to organise matches at the stadium.

In 2014 Pernod Ricard India announced its signing of Bollywood actors Ranveer Singh and Arjun Kapoor as brand ambassadors. General manager of Marketing Raja Banerjee said that, "We firmly believe that the dynamic duo represents the dreams of this country and therefore would reinforce our brand positioning". However, they maintained that Shah Rukh Khan would continue to promote the brand.

=== Sponsorship ===
The Royal Stag brand often sponsors musical and sporting events. It sponsored the Sahara Cup matches in Toronto, Canada from 1996 to 1999. Under the name "Seagram's Royal Stag Mega Music", the brand sponsored a multi-city music tour featuring Strings, along with Saif Ali Khan (then brand ambassador) and Indian rock 'n roll band Parikrama in January 2008. Royal Stag is the title sponsor of the Mirchi Music Awards.

== Sales ==
In 2002, Seagram's Imperial Blue and Royal Stag emerged as the fastest growing brands in the domestic market. Royal Stag saw 53% rise in its sale from 1.12 million cases in 2001 to 1.75 million case in 2002. In 2010, Royal Stag first time crossed the mark of 10 million cases and Pernod Ricard became the first multinational company to cross this mark in India. In 2013 calendar month, Royal Stag first time crossed retail sale worth more than $1 billion. It had a total of $1.3 billion in retail sale. Royal Stag sold 16.1 million cases in 2014 and remained the third biggest-selling whisky in India from 2011 behind Officer's Choice and McDowell's No.1.

The following table shows the annual sales of Royal Stag:

Year	Sales (in million cases)
2001	1.12
2002	1.75
2004	3
2006	4.2
2007	5.6
2008	6.8
2009	8.4
2010	10.4
2011	12.5
2012	14
2013	14.8
2014	16.1

== See also ==
- India-made foreign liquor
- List of Indian beverages
