= Blenders Pride =

Brand of Indian Whisky

- Type: Indian whisky
- Manufacturer: Pernod Ricard
- Distributor: Pernod Ricard
- Origin: India
- Introduced: 1995
- Alcohol by volume: 42.8%
- Colour: Brown
- Flavour: Smooth and smoky
- Ingredients: Indian grain spirits, Scotch malt
- Variants: Blenders Pride; Blenders Pride Reserve Collection
- Related products: Imperial Blue; Royal Stag; Chivas Regal; 100 Pipers
- Website: Pernod-Ricard.com/Blender-Pride

Blenders Pride launched in 1995. It is one of the most popular brand of Indian whisky, owned by Pernod Ricard. It is a blend of Indian grain spirits and imported Scotch malt.

Pernod Ricard has identified Blenders Pride as one of their core brands in India. The brand's main national competitors are Royal Challenge, Signature and Antiquity from United Spirits Ltd, and Peter Scot from Khoday India Limited, In some states, Blenders Pride also competes with Haig Gold Label from Diageo and Rockford Reserve from Modi Illva.

== History ==
Blenders Pride was launched in India in 1995 by Seagram. Seagram's global business was jointly acquired by Pernod Ricard and Diageo on 21 December 2001. Seagram's Indian operations were acquired by Pernod Ricard. Pernod Ricard had previously entered the Indian market by acquiring a 74% stake in United Agencies Ltd (UAL), with a bottling facility in Kolhapur, Maharashtra. UAL was merged with Seagram's Indian business and continued operations under the name Seagram Manufacturing Ltd. The decision to integrate UAL into Seagram was taken due to the latter's larger operations in the country.

== Reserve Collection ==
Pernod Ricard launched Blenders Pride Reserve Collection in December 2011. At the time of its launch, the Reserve Collection was the most expensive whisky produced in India. This whisky is a blend of Scotch malts that have been matured through the unique Solera process, with the finest Indian grain spirits, strengthening the Blenders Pride brand’s presence in the market even further.

UK-based consultants CARTILS helped design the branding, bottle shape and packaging for Reserve Collection. CARTILS said that its aim was to "stay loyal to the original brand yet to ensure that its [Reserve Collection] significantly more premium nature was clearly communicated." The bottle shape for Reserve Collection is similar to Blenders Pride but has embossing.

== Sales ==
Blenders Pride sold 250,000 cases in 2003. out of 1.5 million cases country-wide in the premium whisky segment. In March 2004, Seagram Manufacturing Ltd. claimed that Blenders Pride had surpassed Shaw Wallace's "Royal Challenge" (now owned by United Breweries Group) to become the largest-selling premium whisky in Andhra Pradesh.

The following table shows the annual sales of Blenders Pride:

Year	Sales (in million cases)
2003	0.25
2006	1.2
2007	1.5
2008	1.9
2009	2.3
2010	2.8
2011	3.5
2012	4
2013	4.2
