= Officer's Choice =

Brand of Indian Whisky

- Logo of Officer's Choice
- Type: Indian whisky
- Manufacturer: Allied Blenders & Distillers
- Distributor: Allied Blenders & Distillers
- Origin: India
- Introduced: 1988
- Alcohol by volume: 42.8%
- Colour: Brown
- Variants: Officer's Choice Blue Officer's Choice rum(new) Officer's Choice Black
- Website: abdindia.com/officer-s-choice

Officer's Choice, commonly known as OC, is an Indian whisky brand which is owned by Allied Blenders & Distillers (ABD), formerly BDA. It is considered to be one of the largest spirit brands in the world. In 2015 Officer's Choice overtook Smirnoff vodka to become the world's largest selling spirit brand. In calendar year 2014, the brand sold 28.4 million cases, higher than any other spirit brand in the world. Compared to the other Indian whiskies which are mainly made from molasses (therefore technically making them rums), OC is made from grain.

== History ==
In 1988 Kishore Chhabria, the future founder of Allied Blenders & Distilleries (ABD), was then managing director of the Shaw Wallace, an Indian liquor manufacturer based in Kolkata owned by his elder brother, Manu Chhabria. Kishore Chhabria noticed that all attention had been given to frontline brands and some brands had been ignored by the administration of the company. To boost neglected brands, he set up a separate division of the company in Delhi and created a new whisky which he intended to have affordability with class.

=== Dispute over ownership ===
Kishore Chhabria had a long dispute with Vijay Mallya of United Spirits over ownership of the Officer's Choice brand. In 1990s Kishore Chhabria fell out with his brother Manu Chhabria and left Shaw Wallace, taking "Officer's Choice" with him. Later he joined Vijay Mallya who gave Kishore equal stakes of his company, Herbertson. At that time OC became a product of Herbertson. Later Kishore also fell out with Mallya, and left Herbertson taking a single brand, "Officer's Choice" with him. He established his own company, Allied Blenders & Distilleries (ABD), and OC became its prime brand. However, Mallya bought Shaw Wallace after the death of Manu Chhabria. Mallya also claimed that "Officer's Choice" was the product of his company. Finally, this dispute was resolved out of court with Kishore paying ₹8 crore (US$830,000) to Mallya.

== Variants ==
Officer's Choice Blue logo

Officer's Choice historically targeted daily wage earners. To extend its consumer scope ABD introduced premium versions of Officer's Choice namely Officer's Choice Blue, and Officer's Choice Black. The black variety is a blend prepared using Indian grain spirits and rare Scotch malts that have been aged in charred oak barrels.

== Sales ==
In 2013, OC for the first time became the largest selling whisky in the world by overtaking Johnnie Walker. It sold 23.8 million cases in 2013 which was 15% of the liquor market share of India. As per 2013 sales, OC was the third largest selling spirit brand in the world, while Smirnoff vodka was on the top spot. OC sold 28.3 million cases in 2014 and overtook Smirnoff vodka as the largest selling spirit brand in the world. In 2013 calendar year, the retail sale of Officer's Choice exceeded $1.25 bn. OC became the 3rd Indian spirit brand to cross the $1 billion mark, the other 2 being McDowell's No. 1 and Royal Stag.

Following table shows annual sale of Officer's Choice since 2009.

Year	Sales (in million cases)
2009	11.1
2010	11.6
2011	16.5
2012	18.1
2013	23.8
2014	28.5
2019	36.5

== See also ==
- List of Indian beverages
