= Bagpiper (whisky) =

Brand of Indian Whisky

- Type: Indian whisky
- Manufacturer: United Spirits Ltd (USL) (Diageo)
- Origin: India
- Introduced: October 1976
- Discontinued: Bagpipes
- Alcohol by volume: 42.8%
- Colour: Brown
- Flavour: Light malty aroma, smooth woody character
- Variants: Bagpiper; Bagpiper Gold
- Related products: McDowell's No.1; Director's Special; DSP Black; Royal Challenge; Signature; Antiquity
- Website: unitedspirits.in/bagpiper

Bagpiper is a brand of Indian whisky, manufactured by United Spirits Ltd (USL), a subsidiary of Diageo. It was launched in October 1976. Bagpiper is sold in a square bottle with black and gold packaging design. The company describes the whisky's flavour as "a light malty aroma and a hint of a smooth woody character, owing to the use of malt spirits specifically matured in pre-identified American oak casks". It is similar to a blended whisky flavored with pot still malt whisky, but the neutral spirits used as base are distilled from molasses instead of grain.

The brand uses tamper-proof bottles. It also introduced whisky in Tetra Pak. Bagpiper was the seventh largest selling spirits brand by volume in 2010, according to London-based liquor research firm International Wine & Spirit Research (IWSR). The brand sold 16.92 million cases of 9 litres each that year. It was ranked ninth in the 2009.

Bagpiper is exported to ten countries, including those in the Middle East.

== History ==
Bagpiper was launched in 1976 by Herbertsons Limited, which had been acquired by the United Breweries Group in 1973. Herbertsons Limited was merged with several other UB Group-owned companies to form United Spirits Limited in 2006.

In 1993, with Dharmendra as brand ambassador, the brand introduced the slogan of "Khoob Jamega Rang Jab Mil Bhaitenge Teen Yaar. Aap, Mein Aur Bagpiper", and the company continues to use the slogan in its advertising. Bagpiper has had several Bollywood stars as brand ambassadors including Ashok Kumar, Jackie Shroff, Dharmendra, Sunny Deol, Shahrukh Khan and Ajay Devgn.

Bagpiper was India's largest selling whisky from 2005 until 2010, when it was overtaken by Officer's Choice, which is manufactured by Allied Blenders & Distillers (ABD).

== Sales ==
- 1987: Annual sales of 1 million cases
- 1991: Annual sales of 2 million cases
- 1993: Annual sales of 3 million cases
- 1996: Annual sales of 4 million cases
- 1998: Annual sales of 5 million cases
- 2003: Annual sales of 6 million cases
- 2005: Becomes India's largest selling whisky
- 2006: Annual sales of 10 million cases
- 2008: Annual sales of 15.4 million cases
- 2009: Annual sales of 16.3 million cases.
- 2010: Annual sales of 16.4 million cases.
- 2011: Annual sales of 15.8 million cases.
- 2012: Annual sales of 14 million cases.
