= Black Dog (whisky) =

Brand of blended Scotch whisky

Black Dog Scotch Whisky
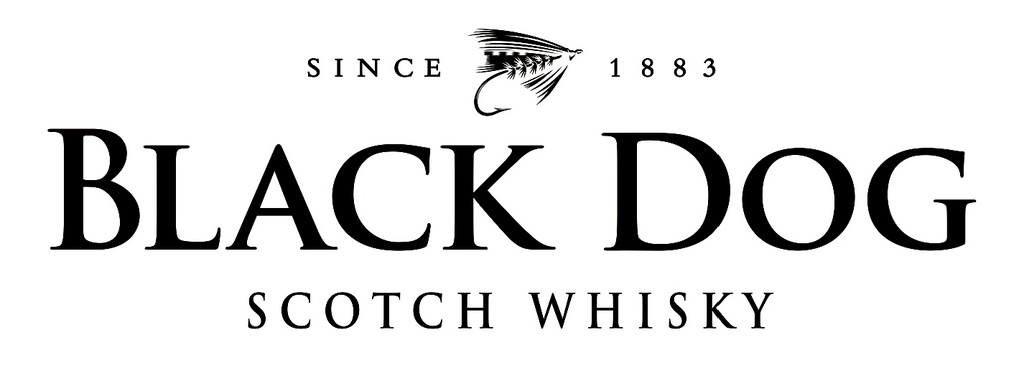
- Black Dog Scotch Whisky brand logo
- Type: Scotch whisky
- Manufacturer: United Spirits Ltd (USL) (Diageo)
- Origin: Scotland (bottled in India)
- Introduced: 1883
- Alcohol by volume: 42.8%
- Colour: Amber
- Variants: Black Dog Black Reserve; Black Dog Gold Reserve Aged 12 Years; Black Dog Reserve Aged 18 Years; Black Dog Quintessence Aged 21 Years
- Related products: 100 Pipers; Blenders Pride; Imperial Blue; Royal Stag
- Website: unitedspirits.in/scotch-brands.aspx

Black Dog is a brand of blended Scotch whisky produced by the Indian beverage company United Spirits Limited (USL), a subsidiary of Diageo.

The Black Dog was first blended and bottled in Scotland in 1883 by James MacKinlay but since 1992 is bottled and marketed in India. The whiskies used in the blend come from Scotland.

In 2013, Black Dog was reported to be the world's fastest growing Scotch whisky by volume, according to International Wine and Spirits Research (IWSR).

Black Dog is bottled in Parmori District Nasik in Maharashtra, by importing the undiluted spirits from Scotland, a strategy that avoids the import duties imposed on liquor imports to India that are bottled prior to import (import duties may be as high as 150% for liquor bottled prior to import, but only about 30% when bottled in India).

The brand's main competitors in India outside of the United Spirits family are 100 Pipers Blended Scotch owned by Pernod Ricard and an expression from the Teachers' family, Teacher's 50, a premium 12-year-old Scotch whisky, blended and matured in Scotland but bottled in India starting August 1997 to celebrate India's 50 years of independence, owned by Suntory Global Spirits.

== History ==
The Black Dog brand was first blended and bottled in Scotland in 1883 by James MacKinlay, a second-generation blender of the Leith-based family of Scotland to meet an order placed by Herbert Musgrave Phipson, owner of Phipson & Co. Wine Merchants from Bombay (now Mumbai), India. He was assisted in this task by Walter Samuel Millard (1864–1952), a 19-year-old British employee of Phipson- who was responsible for dispatching the consignment back to India- arriving in 1884. The brand was named Millard Black Dog and legend has it that he named it after his favourite salmon fishing fly, known as the Black Dog. There is no proof or evidence to this effect, or that Millard, a 19-year-old employee of Herbert Phipson had a brand of Scotch Whisky named after him.

McDowell & Co (now known as USL) and United Distillers formed United Distillers India Limited in 1992, creating India's first joint venture in the alcoholic beverages industry. It began bottling operations in Nashik to produce Black Dog for the Indian market.

In April 2004, it was reported in the media that USL (then named McDowell & Co) was planning to sell Black Dog in Pakistan, Nepal, Sri Lanka and Thailand. Black Dog had been sold in Pakistan during the British Raj, prior to the Partition of India. In October the same year, it was reported that McDowell & Co was negotiating with a company in Pakistan to manufacture Black Dog. According to Vijay Rekhi, then managing director of McDowell & Co, and then President of the UB Group's spirits division, "It will only be a small set-up as just three per cent of the Pakistani population is permitted alcohol consumption. But we are looking at the opportunity as we are trying to widen our footprints in the SAARC region." Rekhi also stated that bottling was already underway in Sri Lanka and the company was looking to expand to Bangladesh, Malaysia and Myanmar. Even that small percentage (mainly tourists, expatriates, Parsees, Christians and non-Muslims), is discouraged from consuming alcohol during the Muslim month of Ramadan. Consumption of liquor by Muslims was banned by the Bhutto Govt in Pakistan in the mid-70s.

2006, McDowell & Co Limited, Herbertsons Limited, Triumph Distillers and Vintners Private Limited, Baramati Grape Industries India Limited, Shaw Wallace Distilleries Limited and four other companies are merged to form United Spirits Limited.

== Blends ==
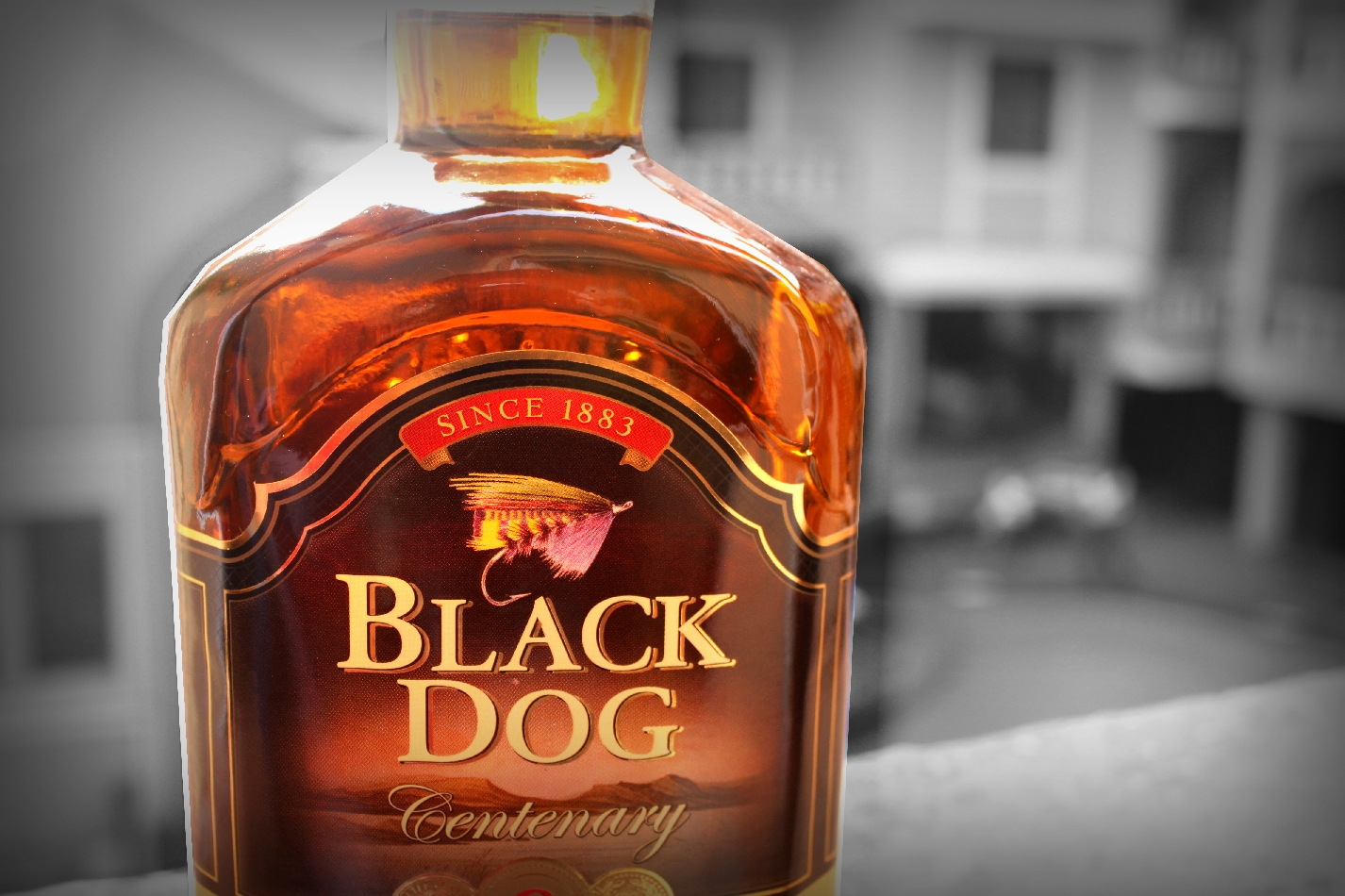
Bottle of Black Dog Centenary

Black Dog is available in five variations:

- Black Dog Black Reserve – Earlier known as Black Dog Centenary, it is an eight-year-old Scotch whisky. It was launched in New Delhi in September 2006.
- Black Dog Gold Reserve Aged 12 Years – Earlier known as Black Dog Deluxe. It was the first variant of Black Dog.
- Black Dog Quintessence Aged 21 Years – This version includes 25 single malts and grain whiskies, primarily from the Speyside Valley in Scotland. It is a limited edition of which only 3,540 bottles have been produced. The blend was rated gold at The Internationaler Spirituosen Wettbewerb 2013.
- Black Dog Reserve Aged 18 Years – This is a blend of aged malt and grain whiskies, aged for a minimum of 18 years in oak casks. It was launched in April 2011. It received the Gold Best in Class Award in the Scotch Whisky – Deluxe Blend – Aged 18 Years category at the International Wine and Spirit Competition 2011, and was rated gold at the Internationaler Spirituosen Wettbewerb 2013.
- Black Dog Millard’s Private Reserve 14YO – A blend of 14-year-old single malts, with new citrus flavours, hints of vanilla and lightly toasted oak, reportedly with the addition of single malts from Linkwood distillery as well as the two additional years of maturation adding to its distinctive aromas and taste.

== Timeline ==
Year	Events
1883	Black Dog Scotch Whisky founded in Scotland
1992	Black Dog started to be bottled and marketed in India
1995	Black Dog Aged 12 years incorporates a new packaging design
2006	Launch of the Black Dog Centenary Blended Scotch Whisky; Black Dog Deluxe Aged 12 Years incorporates a new packaging design; Black Dog Aged 12 Years is rated Gold at Monde Selection 2006
2010	Black Dog Reserve Aged 18 Years Blended Scotch Whisky is launched
2011	Gold Best in Class Award in the Scotch Whisky Deluxe Blend – 18-year-old category at the International Wine and Spirit Competition 2011
2012	Black Dog Quintessence Aged 21 Years Blended Scotch Whisky is launched
2013	Black Dog Centenary Aged & Rare is renamed as The Black Dog Centenary Black Reserve Blended Scotch Whisky; Black Dog Deluxe Aged 12 Years is renamed as The Black Dog Deluxe Gold Reserve Aged 12 Years Blended Scotch Whisky; Black Dog Reserve Aged 18 Years & Black Dog Quintessence Aged 21 Years is rated Gold at ISW 2013
2021	Black Dog Millard’s Private Reserve 14YO is launched

== Accolades ==
The Black Dog range of Scotch Whiskies have won gold medals at several spirits competitions including The Monde Selection in 2006 and the World Spirits Awards in 2011 for the Black Dog Aged 12 Years and the Monde Selection, World Spirits Awards, and the International Wine and Spirit Competition in 2011 for the Black Dog Aged 18 Years. The Black Dog Reserve Aged 18 Years and the Black Dog Quintessence Aged 21 Years also won gold at Internationaler Spirituosen Wettbewerb 2013.

== Marketing ==
USL has used jazz events as a platform to promote Black Dog in India. A Black Dog "Jazz Incident" was held in Mumbai on 22 February 2008. A concert featuring The Curtis King Band, was part of "The Black Dog Jazz Series", a series of jazz concerts in India. The band also performed at Black Dog "Jazz Incident" held in Gurgaon, Haryana on 28 February 2008.

In 2008, as part of the 125th anniversary celebrations of Black Dog, the company held a 10-city concert tour by Stephen Kabakos, beginning in Delhi on 8 May. The concert also included shows in Kolkata, Guwahati, Hyderabad, Mysore, Bangalore, Goa and Pune. The Westin Gurgaon, New Delhi threw a celebration dinner to celebrate Black Dog's 130th anniversary in 2013.

== In popular culture ==
- In the 1988 Bollywood film Shahenshah, Amrish Puri, playing a don named JK, orders Black Dog whisky while watching a female dancer perform an "item number". The noted villain Prem Chopra asks him why he favours the brand, to which he replies "Jab bhi mein gori haseeno ko dekhta hoon, mere dil me kale kutte bhaukne lagte hain. Tab mein Black Dog whisky peeta hoon." (When I see fair-skinned beauties, black dogs bark in my heart. And then I drink Black Dog whisky.)
- The origin of the name Black Dog is referenced in the 2006 novel A Twisted Cue by Rohit Handa. The novel's main character Mulkally, likes perpetuating colonial myths and stories, one of which concerned the origin of the label Black Dog. Mulkally claims that the whisky was specially blended and bottled for the Bengal Club in Calcutta – hence "Kala Kutta" (Black Dog in Hindi) for Calcutta. However, Mulkally knows that Black Dog was actually named after a salmon fly.
