= Imperial Blue (whisky) =

Brand of Indian Whisky

- Type: Indian whisky
- Manufacturer: Tilaknagar Industries
- Distributor: Tilaknagar Industries
- Origin: India
- Introduced: 2000; 26 years ago
- Alcohol by volume: 42.8%
- Ingredients: Indian grain spirits, Scotch malt
- Related products: Royal Stag; Blenders Pride; Chivas Regal; 100 Pipers
- Website: Pernod-Ricard.com/Imperial-Blue

Imperial Blue, abbreviated to IB and also known as Seagram's Imperial Blue, is a brand of Indian whisky launched in 1997 and currently owned by Tilaknagar Industries.

Being a blend of Indian grain spirits with imported Scotch malts, it is commonly available in 750ml, 375ml and 180ml bottles, and also available in 90ml bottles.

== History ==
Imperial Blue was launched in India in 1997 by Seagram. In December 2001, a year before Pernod Ricard (PR) bought its Indian operations, Seagram's global business was jointly acquired by PR and Diageo.

Pernod Ricard had previously entered the Indian market by acquiring a 74% stake in United Agencies Ltd (UAL), with a bottling facility in Kolhapur, Maharashtra. UAL was merged with Seagram's Indian business and continued operations under the name Seagram Manufacturing Ltd. The decision to integrate UAL into Seagram was taken due to the latter's larger operations in the country.

In December 2025, it was announced that Tilaknagar Industries had acquired the brand from PR for €412.6 million.

== Marketing ==
Imperial Blue was relaunched in 2002, targeting males age 25–35 years with the advertising slogan "Men Will Be Men".

Advertising alcoholic beverages is banned in India as per the Cable Television Network (Regulation) Amendment Bill, which came into effect on 8 September 2000. Pernod Ricard circumvents the ban through surrogate advertising.

Imperial Blue commissioned a feature-length film called Men Will Be Men in 2011, starring Rajesh Kumar, Gaurav Chopra, Rohit Khurana, Rahil Tandon, and Zeenal Kamdar. The film was made over a period of seven days, with a budget of ₹10 million (US$100,000), and was released nationally.

Sponsor of musical concerts in India, it became an official sponsor of the World Series Hockey in February 2012.

== Sales ==
The following table shows the annual sales of Imperial Blue:

Year	Sales (in million cases)
2000	0.29
2001	0.45
2002	1.10
2006	2.5
2007	3.1
2008	3.8
2009	4.8
2010	6.1
2011	7.2
2012	8.8
