= Peter Scot =

Indian whisky brand

- Type: Indian whisky
- Manufacturer: Khoday India Limited (KIL)
- Origin: India
- Introduced: May 1968
- Alcohol by volume: 42.8%
- Variants: Peter Scot; Peter Scot Black
- Related products: Red Knight; Honeybee

Peter Scot is a brand of Indian whisky, manufactured by Khoday India Limited (KIL), and launched in May 1968. It is a flagship brand of the company and is manufactured at their Bangalore facility. In Khoday Distilleries Limited vs. The Scotch Whisky Association and Others, Peter Warren, an employee of Khoday, told the Supreme Court of India that the brand name Peter Scot was made up using his father's first name, "Peter", and his nationality, "Scot". Another factor in choosing the name was due to the British explorer, Captain Scott, and his son Peter Scott. Although the name "Scott" is spelt with two t's, it is phonetically the same as the word Scot. The brand's main competitors are Pernod Ricard's Blenders Pride and United Spirits Limited's Royal Challenge.

== History ==
Khoday India Limited (KIL) began producing Peter Scot whisky in May 1968, and registered the trademark in 1974. In 1986, the Scotch Whisky Association (SWA) moved the Assistant Registrar Trademarks for cancellation of the Peter Scot trademark. The SWA claimed that the name was deceptively similar to 'Scotch', which allegedly lead consumers to believe that the product had a Scottish connection. The Registrar ordered the deletion of the Peter Scot trademark in 1989. However, the decision was reversed several times, until a single-judge bench of the Madras High Court, followed by an identical order from the Division bench of the same Court ruled in favour of the SWA. The Court ruled that "the adoption of a name which indicates the geographical region even when the goods had no connection with that place, was itself dishonest". KIL appealed the 12 October 2007 high court order in the Supreme Court, arguing that SWA had knowledge about registration of the trademark as early as September 1974, but had waited for more than 12 years to move the Registrar. On 27 May 2008, the Supreme Court ruled in favour of KIL, allowing it to keep the Peter Scot trademark.

In its judgment, the Supreme Court considered the tests applied by courts in England, Australia and the United States regarding the deceptive similarity of goods. The Court also referred to a passage in Kerly's Law of Trade Marks and Trade Names and ruled that, "the goods are expensive and not of a kind usually selected without deliberation and the customers are generally educated persons which are all matters to be considered". It also held that "where the class of buyers is educated and rich, the test to be applied is different where the product would be purchased by the villagers, the illiterate and the poor". The Court reached the conclusion that the trademark concerned a class of buyers who were expected to know the value of money, the quality and content of Scotch whisky and the difference in the process of manufacture, the place of manufacture and their origin. The judgement also stated that "the Trademark Registrar as well as the high court failed to apply the consumer's knowledge test to the issue and hence arrived at a wrong conclusion". The SWA described the Supreme Court verdict as "inexplicable". The SWA petition seeking a review of the judgment was dismissed by the Supreme Court in February 2009.

Khoday began exporting Peter Scot to Italy in October 2007.

Khoday's launched Peter Scot Black, a single malt whisky, in Karnataka, Goa, Punjab, Rajasthan, Chandigarh, Daman, and Silvassa in February 2019. The single malt whisky was the brainchild of Khodays' late vice-chairman, L. Srihari Khoday, who had proposed launching a single malt variant of the Peter Scot brand in 2008. The company claims that consumers compared Peter Scot Black to single malt whiskies made by Glenfiddich and Glenmorangie during blind taste tests.
