= Signature (whisky) =

Indian whisky by United Spirits Ltd

- Type: Indian whisky
- Manufacturer: United Spirits Ltd (USL) (Diageo)
- Country of origin: India
- Introduced: 1994
- Alcohol by volume: 42.8%
- Colour: Bright amber
- Ingredients: aged Indian malt; aged Scotch whisky
- Variants: Signature Rare Aged; Signature Premier Grain
- Related products: Bagpiper; McDowell's No.1; Director's Special; DSP Black; Royal Challenge; Antiquity
- Website: www.diageoindia.com/brands/brand-profiles/signature/

Signature, also known as McDowell's Signature, is a brand of Indian whisky, manufactured by United Spirits Ltd (USL), a subsidiary of Diageo. It was launched in 1994. Signature is a blend of imported Scotch whisky and locally produced products. Signature is sold in octagonal bottles which were designed by London-based design firm Claessens International, who also designed the packaging of the bottle. It is available in two variants – Signature Rare Aged and Signature Premier Grain.

== History ==
Signature was launched in 1994 by United Spirits Ltd, formerly known as McDowell Spirits Ltd.

Signature was initially available in quarts (750 ml bottles). 180 ml and 375 ml sizes were introduced in October 1999. Initially launched in the super-premium segment of the Indian whisky market, Signature was lowered to the premium category in 2001. Signature began being sold in Canteen Stores Depot (CSD) for defence services in January 2002. Signature was launched in Tamil Nadu on 5 August 2004.

== Marketing ==
Signature's marketing associates the brand with lifestyle events and "elite sports" such as golf, derby, tennis and polo, besides hosting seminars featuring experts in the field of management and marketing, as well as promoting theatre. Signature sponsors the McDowell's Indian Derby, an annual horse racing event, as well as "Signature IPL Nights", the after match parties of the Indian Premier League. Another event sponsored by the brand is the annual "Signature Fashion Tour". The Signature polo team won the Indian Open Polo Championship in 2002. The McDowell's Signature Club Golf Championship, sponsored by the brand, was launched in 2002.

Signature sponsored Boniface Prabhu's participation at the 2003 French Open Wheelchair Tennis Championship. The following year, and advertised at sports and theatre events, with an advertising budget of ₹8–10 crore that year. It also unveiled an "Icon Series" advertising campaign, which featured entrepreneurs Alok Kejriwal of Contest2Win and Jay Galla of Amaron Batteries "as people who came from nowhere to script new corporate success stories".

In July 2006, Mudra, Bangalore took as the creative agency for the Signature brand from Rediffusion DY&R, Bangalore. In November 2012, Akshay Kumar was signed as the brand ambassador of Signature for their 13-week "Success is living in the spotlight" campaign. Abhay Deol was the brand ambassador for Signature Premier in 2012.

== Sales ==
In the 2008–09 fiscal year, sales of Signature whisky crossed 1 million cases for the first time.

The following table shows the annual sales of Signature Rare:

Year	Sales (in million cases)
1998–99	0.018
2000	0.20
2002	0.18
2003	0.22
2009	1.1
2010	1.3
2011	1.6
2012	1.8

== Awards ==
=== Signature Rare ===
- Bronze at the Concours Mondial de Bruxelles.
- Gold in "Blended Whisky (Under 10 Years Old)" category at the 2010 International Whisky Competition in Chicago.
- Indiastar Award in 2002 for "its innovative concept, visual appeal and convenience".
- Silver and best in class at the 2005 International Wine and Spirit Competition.

=== Signature Premier ===
- "Whisky of the Year 2012" at the International Whisky Competition in Chicago
- "Whisky of the Year 2012" at the World Spirits Awards in Austria
- Second among "India's Most Trusted Whisky Brands 2014" according to the Brand Trust Report, a study conducted by Trust Research Advisory
- Silver at the Ninth ISW International Spirits Competition in Germany

== See also ==
- List of whisky brands
