= Bagpiper =

Bagpiper may refer to:

- A person who plays bagpipes
- Bagpiper (whisky), a brand of Indian whisky

== See also ==
- List of bagpipers
