= Mike Leckie =

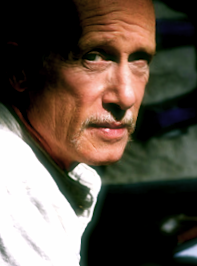
Mike Leckie, 2011

Michael Stuart Leckie (born June 30, 1950) is a neo-classical sculptor in Eugene, Oregon, United States.

== Early life ==
Leckie grew up in Eastern Oregon on a 500 head cattle ranch 35 miles from Fossil, Oregon. As a country boy, he grew up on a horse, learned to ride bulls and spent time competing in the junior rodeo circuit.

== Education ==
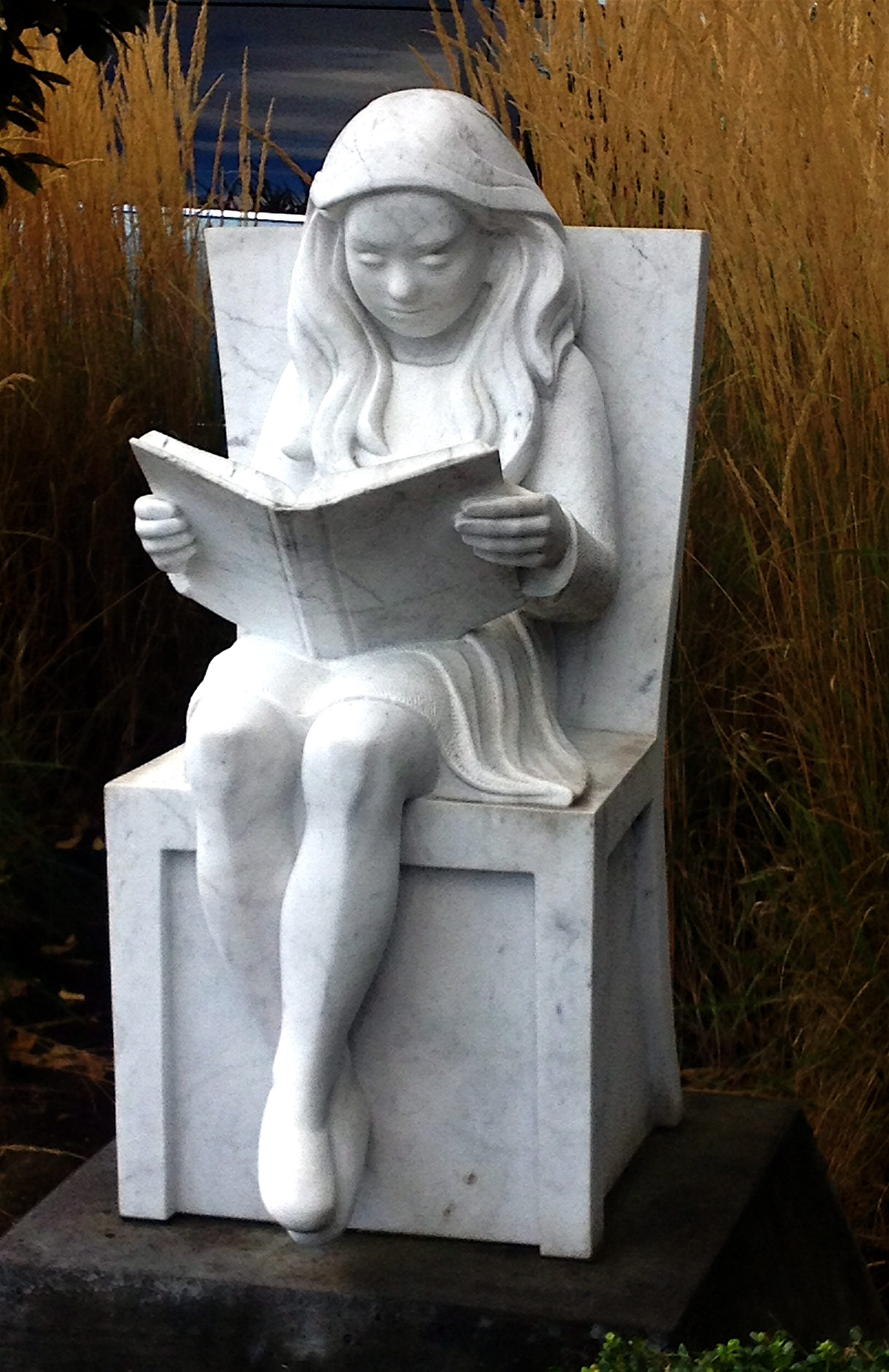
The Reading Girl by Mike Leckie

Leckie graduated with a Bachelor of Arts in Metalsmithing from Oregon State University in 1973 and has done post graduate study and teach art at Instituto Allende in San Miguel Allende, Mexico; at the San Francisco Museum of Modern Art; at California State University, Long Beach; at University of California, Los Angeles; and at the University of Oregon. He began carving marble while attending a graduate studies seminar at the University of Oregon, in 1981.

== Career ==
Leckie imports carving stones from Italy, Portugal, China, Zimbabwe, Brazil, Canada, Australia, and Mexico to his open-air studio in the Oregon forest near Eugene.

Leckie was sanctioned to create the Official Art of the 2008, 2012 and 2016 U.S. Olympic Track and Field Trials.

In 2013 he was commissioned by the Mary LcLeod Bethune Humanitarian Network to create "The First Ladies of Diversity" for a proposed National Monument to Mary McLeod Bethune and Eleanor Roosevelt.

In 2009, the city of Albany, Oregon commissioned a marble statue for its library. "The Reading Girl" is five foot tall statue that greets visitors entering the library.

In 2008 he was commissioned by the Sidney Frank Importing Co. to create a Bronze Portrait Head of Sidney Frank as an award to honor "Excellence in Advertising" by the Wine and Spirits Wholesalers of America.

In 1989 he was commissioned for bas-relief work for the World Champion Masters Track Meet in Eugene, Oregon.
