= Red Knight (whisky) =

Brand of Indian whisky

- Type: Indian whisky
- Manufacturer: Khoday India Limited (KIL)
- Origin: India
- Introduced: 1967
- Alcohol by volume: 42.8%
- Related products: Peter Scot; Honeybee

Red Knight is a brand of Indian whisky, manufactured by Khoday India Limited (KIL), and launched in 1967. The whisky is manufactured at the company's Bangalore facility. Red Knight was initially available only in North India. It was introduced in South India on 23 November 2007.

Red Knight sold an average of 70,000 cases monthly in 2005. Khoday began exporting Red Knight to Italy in October 2007, and Canada in 2008.
