= Director's Special =

Director's Special may refer to:

- Director's Special (whisky), a brand of Indian whisky
- Director's Special (film), a 2013 Kannada film
