= Pincon Spirit Limited =

- Type: Public
- Traded as: BSE: 538771; NSE: PINCON
- Industry: Alcoholic beverages
- Founded: 29 July 1978; 48 years ago in Calcutta, West Bengal, India
- Headquarters: Kolkata, West Bengal, India
- Area served: Bengal, Karnataka and Sikkim
- Key people: Monoranjan Roy & Sarmistha Chatterjee (L.I. Partner)
- Parent: PSL Group
- Website: pinconspirit.in

Pincon Spirit Limited (PSL), formerly Sarang Viniyog Ltd., incorporated in 1978, is an Indian company that manufactures industrial alcohol, Indian-made foreign liquor (IMFL), country liquor and desi darus. Monoranjan Roy serves as the chairman and managing director of the company. It is listed with the Bombay Stock Exchange (BSE), the National Stock Exchange (NSE) and the Securities and Exchange Board of India.

== History ==
Pincon Spirit Limited was incorporated in 1978 as Sarang Viniyog Limited in Calcutta, West Bengal. In that year, the company was listed with Calcutta Stock Exchange issuing 99,300 equity shares. In 2004, Jevan Equipments & Spares and Plant Dealers Limited were acquired and merged with the company. In the 2000s, the company continued acquiring shares of Paul Distributors Private Limited, Priya Laboratories Limited and Yours Laboratories Pvt Ltd. and formed PSL Group comprising the subsidiaries. In 2009 the company entered into an agreement with National Industrial Corporation for the manufacturing of IMFL under the brand name Pincon XXX Rum and Pincon No. 1 Whisky. It had a turnover of Rs. 50 crores in 2010. In August 2011, the company was changed to Pincon Spirit Limited. In that year, the company launched two new products, King's Coin Whisky and Pincon King's Coin Vodka. In 2012 the company launched two more products, Ruby Gold XO Brandy and Royal Pride Whisky. In 2013, the company crossed a turnover of Rs. 300 crores and its brand was registered with Odisha State Beverage Corporation, the government of Uttarakhand and Jharkhand state. During the year, it launched a whisky under a new brand name, Highland Blue Whisky, and acquired sole distributorship right of Fashion Vodka, a premier brand of vodka in West Bengal. In 2014, it started manufacturing the country liquor called Pincon Bangla No. 1, after the acquisition of the country spirit plant of Nation Industrial Corporation Limited. The company also launched Pincon Ultra Force XXX Jamaican Rum and Ruby Gold Orange Flavour Gin in 2015. In 2016, the company acquired Bacchus Enterprises Limited which is engaged in the business of Indian-made Indian liquor (IMIL) and Indian-made foreign liquor (IMFL) in Ludhiana. In May 2017, the company charted out a capex of Rs. 300 ($30 million) through the issuance of foreign currency convertible bonds in London Stock Exchange. The Chairman of the Group Monoranjan Roy was arrested on 2 November 2017 in ponzi scam as it is alleged that public money in the company was siphoned leaving the company in huge debt.

== Operations ==
Pincon Spirit Limited is involved in the manufacturing, bottling and distribution of Indian-made foreign liquor and country spirits and markets its products under the brand name of Pincon. It is also involved in the refining, packaging, and wholesale distribution of fast moving consumer goods. In 2015, the company took major initiatives investing Rs. 400 crores to expand its business operation by setting up new plants and increasing the production capacity of existing units as well as marketing its products in the south and northern part of the country. Currently the company has business activities in the states of West Bengal, Odissa, Jharkhand, Uttarkhand, Haryana, and Karnataka. It plans to expand its operation in Kerala, Puducherry, Goa and Tamil Nadu. In March 2016, Pincon acquired Singapore-based Orbitol Solutions, to export its brands in South East Asian markets.

== IMFL brands ==
Pincon Spirit manufactures whisky, rum, desi daru, vodka, gin and edible oil.

Whisky

- Highland Blue
- Pincon No 1
- King's Coin
- Odisha's Choice

Vodka

- Pincon Perfect Vodka
- King's Coin Vodka

Rum

- Ultra Force XXX Rum
- Pincon XXX Rum
- King's Coin Rum

Gin

- Ruby Gold Gin

Country Sprit

- Bangla No 1
- Bengal Tiger
- Udaan

== Distilleries and units ==
PSL has manufacturing units at eight locations in West Bengal. It is currently expanding its operation in Karnataka, Odisha, Jharkhand, Uttarakhand and Northeastern states.

- Agarpara, North Kolkata
- Bishnupur, Bankura
- Gopalpur, Nadia
- B T Road, North Kolkata
- Kanyapur, Asansol
- Durgapur Expressway, Dankuni, Hooghly
- Belda, Kharagpur
- Baranagar
