= Indian Malt Whisky Association =

- Abbreviation: IMWA
- Formation: 06/2025
- Type: Membership organisation
- Purpose: To protect and promote Indian whisky
- Headquarters: G-17, Ground Floor, JMD Pacific Square, Sector-15 DLF QE Gurgaon Haryan, 122002 New Delhi
- Products: Indian whisky
- Members: 4
- Director: Rajesh Chopra
- Website: https://indianmaltwhisky.org/

The Indian Malt Whisky Association is a Trade association body that protects and promotes Indian whisky.

On February 20, 2025 the IMWA submitted an application to the Geographical Indications Registry to have Indian single malt whisky recognised as a geographical indication.

== Goals ==
The goals of the Indian Malt Whisky Association are:

- to promote Indian whisky and the Made in India brand
- set regulatory and technical standards for the industry

== Members ==
There are four founding members in the Indian Malt Whisky Association and these are

- Paul John (John Distillers)
- Rakshit Jagdale (Amrut Distilleries)
- Abhishek Khaitan (Radico Khaitan)
- Siddhartha Sharma (Piccadily Agro)

== Qualification criteria for whisky ==
The Indian Malt whisky association has set a qualification criteria for single malt whisky which includes:

- production from 100% barley
- production in a single distillery
- production in copper pot stills and not column stills
- Only using malt barley, water and yeast
- Maturation in wooden oak barrels of less than 700L for a minimum of three years
