= Royal Challenge =

Brand of Indian Whisky

Royal Challenge (whisky/brand)
- Type: Indian whisky
- Manufacturer: United Spirits Ltd (USL) (Diageo)
- Origin: India
- Introduced: early 1980s
- Alcohol by volume: 42.8%
- Colour: Golden amber
- Related products: Bagpiper; McDowell's No.1; Director's Special; DSP Black; Signature; Antiquity; Royal Challenge; American Pride
- Website: unitedspirits.in/royal-challenge

Royal Challenge, commonly referred to by the abbreviation RC, is a brand of Indian whisky, manufactured by United Spirits (USL), a subsidiary of Diageo. It was launched in the early 1980s. According to Binod K. Maitin, a United Breweries technician who oversees all the liquor blends for the company, Royal Challenge is a grain flavored whisky, blended with Scotch malts and Indian malts. In an article for The Wall Street Journal, reporter Eric Felton states that, "About 12% of the blend comes from real malt whiskies: some of it made in India, some actual Scotch. The rest of the mix is a neutral spirit distilled from molasses. (It's much easier and cheaper to grow sugarcane than barley in India.) That means that, strictly speaking, Royal Challenge, like most Indian "whisky", is actually a rum flavored to pass as whisky." The manufacturer has refused to state the percentage of Scotch whisky used in the blend. In the United States, Royal Challenge is referred to as "spirit whisky". Now, A IPL Team, Royal Challengers Bengaluru, has been named after it. Besides India, Royal Challenge is sold in several other countries including the Middle East and the United States.

== History ==
Royal Challenge was originally manufactured by Shaw Wallace and launched in India in the early 1980s. In March 2000, Shaw Wallace re-launched the brand with new packaging and advertising created by Ammiratis Puris Lintas.

United Spirits Ltd (USL), a Diageo group company, acquired Shaw Wallace in July 2005. On 1 April 2008, Shaw Wallace was merged with USL and Royal Challenge officially became a USL brand. The same month, the UB Group hired Claessens International to redesign the packaging of Royal Challenge.

Royal Challenge was officially introduced in the United States by American United Beer & Spirits (UBS) at the Wine and Spirits Wholesalers of America Conference in April 2012.

== Marketing ==
In an early advertising campaign, Shaw Wallace described its products as "India's most wanted" and "The competition's envy, Shaw Wallace's pride". In December 2003, Royal Challenge launched a new advertising campaign, "What's life without Royal Challenge". The new campaign sought to portray the Royal challenge drinker as a "young contemporary urban male who exudes relaxed confidence". The campaign, created by Orchard, was estimated to cost Shaw Wallace ₹ 12-14 crore. Royal Challenge has often sponsored golf events like the CII Golf championship, the Indian Golf Championship and the Indian Open Golf, and also associated itself with the sport. In 2004, Bangalore-based Golfware India Pvt Ltd was licensed to manufacture and distribute golf clubs and accessories with the Royal Challenge logo.The Indian Premier League (IPL) team Royal Challengers Bengaluru was named after and is sponsored by Royal Challenge. The team was first unveiled on 12 March 2008. A PIL was later filed by a Faridabad-based resident Krishan Kumar Aggarwal, who alleged that the UB Group was seeking to promote its liquor brand under the garb of the IPL team. The Supreme Court of India dismissed the petition on 29 April 2008. Royal Challenge also partners other IPL teams (Delhi Captitals and Punjab Kings) and the Sahara Force India Formula 1.

In February 2012, American United Beer & Spirits (UBS), the exclusive United States importer and distributor of the UB Group, signed Indian actress-turned-enterpreuner Pooja Batra to represent Royal Challenge whisky in the US.

== Sales ==
Royal Challenge led the premium whisky segment by sales volume throughout India during the 1980s and 1990s. It held this position until 2004.

In the 2003–04 fiscal year (ending 31 March 2004), Royal Challenge become the first premium whisky to cross one million cases in a year. It accounted for 65% of the 1.5 million-case premium whisky segment of the Indian Made Foreign Liquor (IMFL) industry.

The following table shows the annual sales of Royal Challenge:

Year	Sales (in million cases)
2002-03	0.85
2006	1.1
2007	1.2
