= Romanov (vodka) =

Indian brand of vodka

- Romanov premium vodka
- Type: Vodka
- Manufacturer: United Spirits (USL)
- Origin: India
- Alcohol by volume: 42.8%
- Proof (US): 75
- Colour: Colourless
- Ingredients: Grain
- Variants: Premium; Green Apple; Orange; Lemon
- Related products: White Mischief

Romanov is a brand of vodka manufactured and marketed by United Spirits, a subsidiary of United Breweries Group. The brand derives its name from the Romanov dynasty that ruled the Russian Empire from 1612 to 1917. It has a two-star rating from the International Taste and Quality Institute. It contains 42.8% alcohol by volume.

== Variants ==
Romanov comes in four flavours:

- Premium
- Orange
- Lemon
- Apple

Romanov Red is another brand name owned by USL, used for marketing vodka as well as non-alcoholic energy drinks.

== Sales ==
Romanov is one of the cheapest vodkas available in India, and thus it is popular in low-cost clubs and with college students. Along with White Mischief, Romanov controls 70% of India's domestic market for vodka, which increased to 89% in 2010. From 2008 to 2017, sales of Romanov's unflavoured vodkas decreased by more than 50%, while flavoured vodka sales increased more than tenfold.
