= McDowell's No.1 Celebration =

Indian rum brand

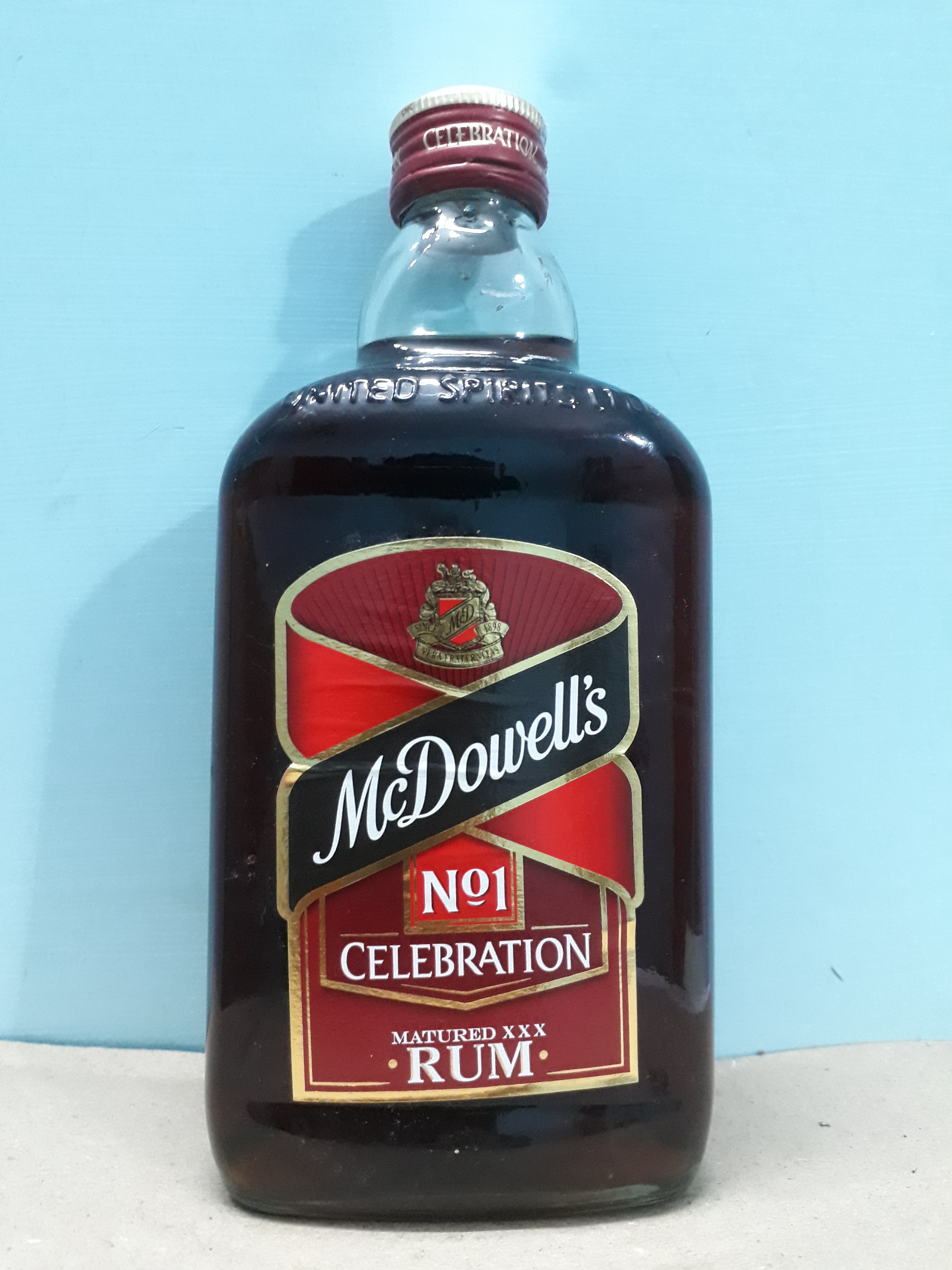
- Mc Dowell No. 1 Rum bottle
- Type: Rum
- Manufacturer: United Spirits Limited
- Origin: India
- Introduced: 1991
- Alcohol by volume: 42.8%
- Colour: Dark
- Variants: McDowell's No.1 Caribbean (White rum)
- Related products: Khukri Rum; Old Monk
- Website: unitedspirits/rum-brands

McDowell's No.1 Celebration also known as Celebration Rum, is a rum manufactured by the United Spirits Limited of India. In 2009, it was among the world's top 3 best selling rum brands. In 2013 it overtook Old Monk as the largest selling rum of India. While in 2015 it also overtook Bacardi as the world's largest selling rum brand.

== History ==
McDowell's No.1 Celebration is one of brand under umbrella brand McDowell's No.1 which was introduced by United Spirits Limited in 1963–64 as McDowell's No.1 Brandy. Celebration Rum was introduced in 1990–91.

== Marketing ==
=== Rivalry with Old Monk ===
Celebration rum has been long term rival of another Indian rum Old Monk. Rise of Celebration rum is associated with decline in Old Monk. Bhaichand Patel of Times of India called it a "contest between David and Goliath". Old Monk being launched in 1954 was the largest selling dark rum in the world for several decades, according to Manu Balchandran of business publication Quartz, "For years, drinking rum in India simply meant drinking Old Monk". But since 2002 Old Monk saw decline in sells. Old Monk sold 3.9 million cases in 2014 which was 54.4% less than its 2010 level while Celebration Rum sold 18.3 million cases in 2014 which was 7.3% higher than its 2010 level.

=== Competition with Bacardi ===
Celebration rum and Bacardi has been involved in close competition in terms of sales since 2012. In 2012 Bacardi sold 19.8 million cases while Celebration rum sold 17.8 million, In 2013 Bacardi sold 19.1 million cases while Celebration rum sold 19 million cases. Lastly in 2014 Celebration Rum marginally overtook Bacardi by selling 18.3 million cases over 18.2 million cases of Bacardi and in 2015 Celebration Rum declared as "world’s best-selling rum brand".

== Awards ==
According to official website of United Spirits, Celebration Rum got following awards.

- Silver from the Beverage Tasting Institute, Chicago, United States, in 2008
- Bronze at the Monde Selection 2006
- 2 Stars at the ITQI Awards 2006
- Silver at the IWSC 2005

== See also ==
- Indian Made Foreign Liquor
