= Four Seasons Wines =

Indian winery

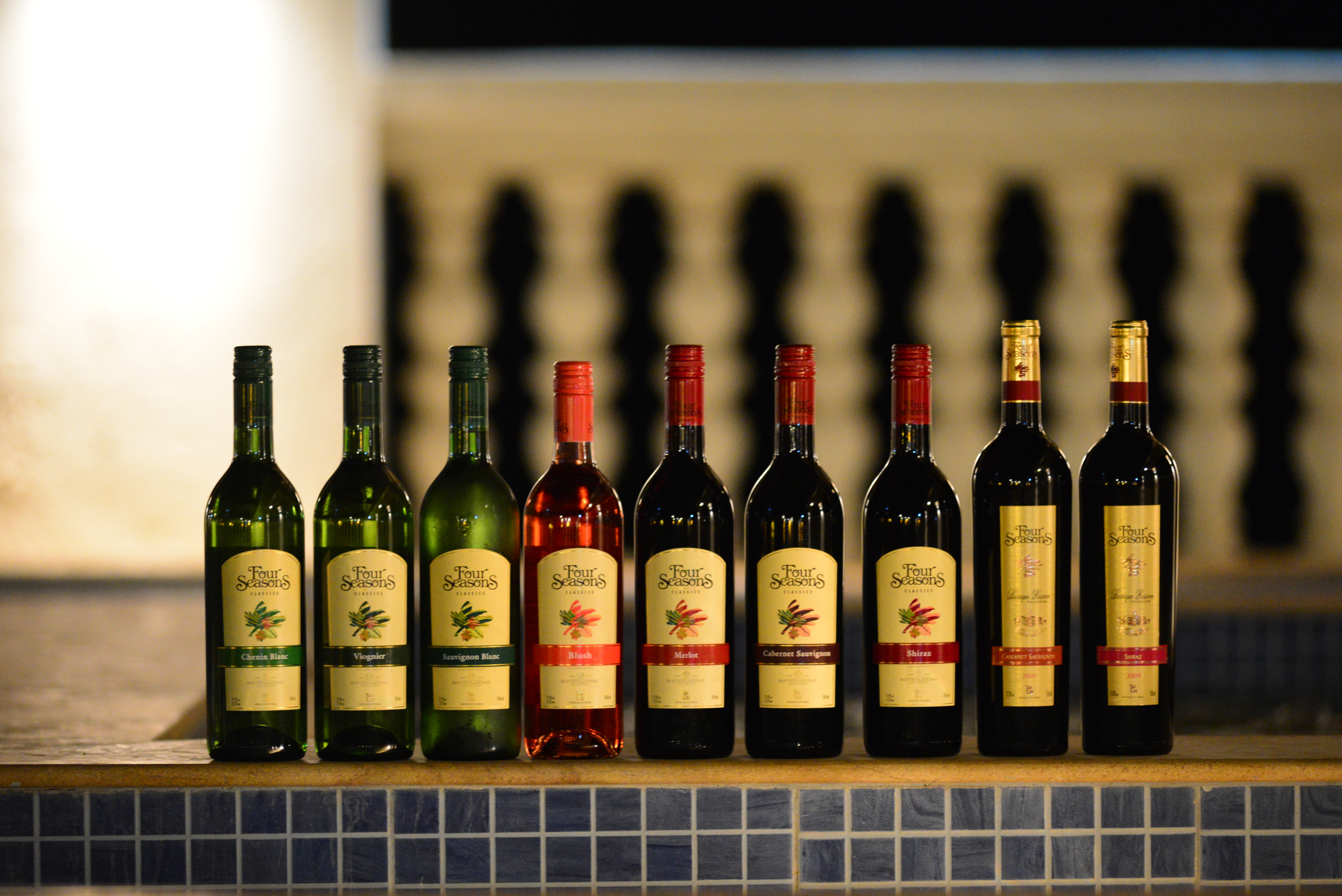
- An assortment of Four Seasons wines
- Type: Wine
- Manufacturer: Four Seasons Wines Ltd
- Origin: India
- Variants: Chenin Blanc; Sauvignon Blanc; Viognier; Cabernet Sauvignon; Shiraz; Merlot; Zinfandel
- Website: fourseasonsvineyards.com

Four Seasons Wines Limited is an Indian winery which was established in 2006, based in Bangalore, India. It produces wines from grapes grown around Sahyadri valley in Maharashtra. It is a subsidiary of United Spirits Limited (USL), which is itself part of the United Breweries Group (UB Group). Four Seasons Wines manufactures and markets wines in India. It provides red, white, and rosé wines. Four Seasons Wines markets its wines under two brand names: Zinzi and Four Seasons.

== Vineyard ==
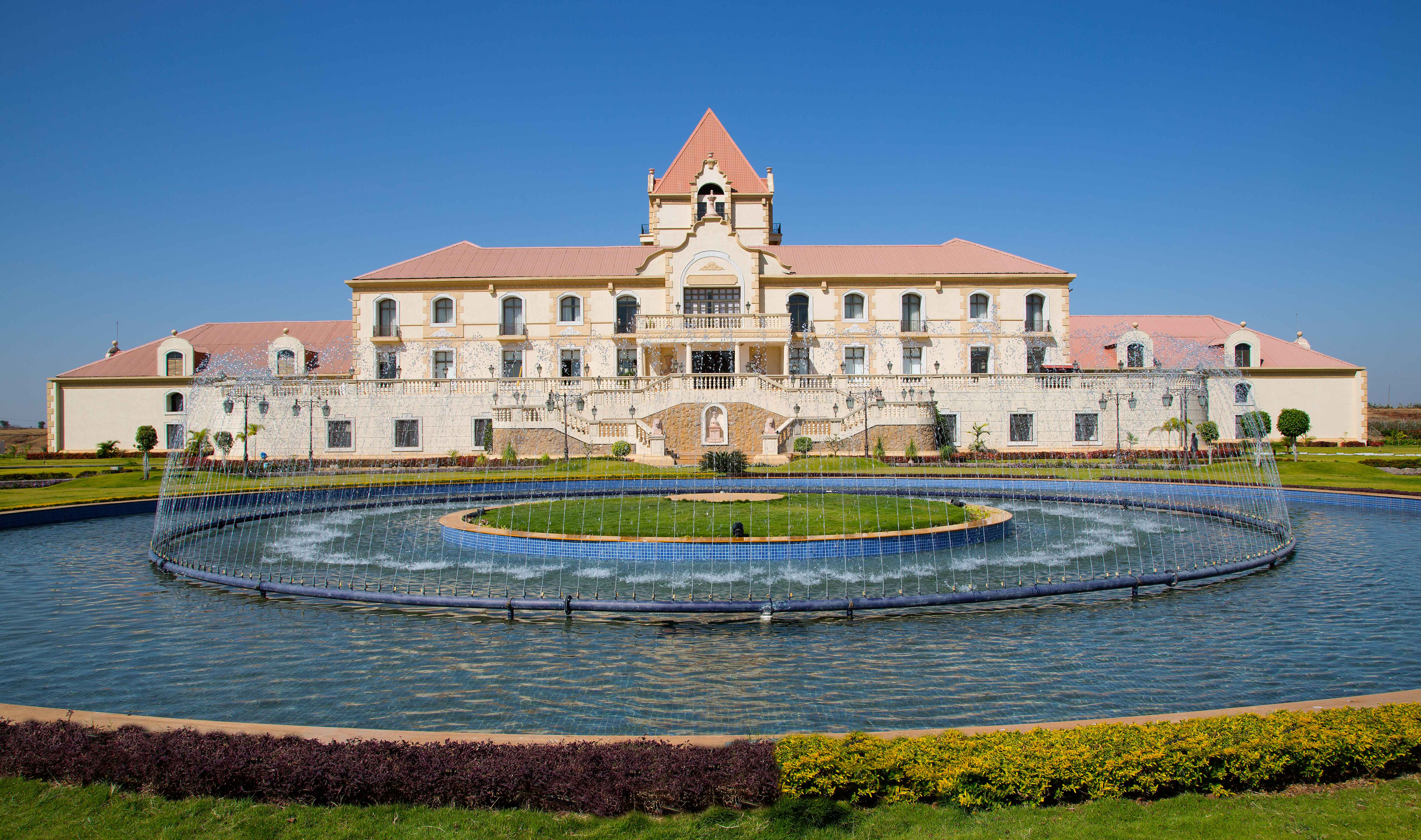
Four Seasons Vineyards Baramati

Four Seasons Wines' vineyard is located in Baramati, around 65 km from Pune and set amidst the Western Ghats near the village of Rotti, India, and has a one million case capacity. The vineyard is built over a plot of around fifty acres and is expanding to 300.

== Wines ==
Four Seasons Wines makes varietal wine from the following grape varieties: three red grapes (Cabernet Sauvignon, Shiraz and Merlot), three white (Sauvignon blanc, Chenin blanc and Viognier), and a Rosé (Blush). The Barrique Reserve Cabernet Sauvignon and Barrique Reserve Shiraz are aged for a year in French oak barrels before being bottled.

== Awards ==
- Four Seasons Barrique Reserve Cabernet Sauvignon won honours at IWC 2010.
- Four Seasons Viognier won gold medal at Sommelier India Wine Competition.
- Four Seasons Sauvignon Blanc won silver medal at Sommelier India Wine Competition.
- Four Seasons Barrique Reserve Shiraz won bronze medal at Sommelier India Wine Competition.
- Ritu Wines won 4 Bronze medals at the 2012 Cathay Pacific Hong Kong International Wine&Spirit Competition (HKIWSC).
