= Pinky Vodka =

Swedish blended vodka

Pinky Vodka is a blended vodka manufactured by United Spirits Ltd (USL), a subsidiary of Diageo. It was created in Sweden in 2008. It became the second best-selling "super premium" vodka in World Duty Free stores, with 12% of category share in the year of its launch.

The 80-proof (40% alcohol by volume) flavored vodkas are sold in the U.S. and globally in a perfume bottle, and are marketed as super ultra-premium.

== Awards ==
- 2009 Gold Medal - Beverage Testing Institute
- 2009 Gold Medal - Frontier Magazine Buyers' Forum Award
- 2009 Medal Winner, Packaging Design - San Francisco World Spirits Competition.
- 2009 Medal Winner - San Francisco World Spirits Competition.

== See also ==
- Vodka infusion
