= White Mischief (liquor) =

Indian brand of vodka

- Type: Indian vodka; Indian brandy
- Manufacturer: United Spirits Ltd (USL)
- Country of origin: India
- Alcohol by volume: 42.8%
- Colour: White
- Variants: Ultra Pure; Strawberry+Ginseng; Mango+Mint; Green apple+Cinnamon
- Related products: Romanov
- Website: White Mischief

White Mischief is a brand of Indian vodka and brandy manufactured by United Spirits Ltd (USL), a subsidiary of Diageo. United Spirits Ltd, the spirits division of Diageo, claims a market share of 46%, making it the largest selling vodka in India.

White Mischief vodka is India's best selling vodka with about 48% market share in the regular vodka segment. It appeals to the youth and is positioned as a young, fun and flirty brand. Zayed Khan was hired as its brand ambassador in 2005.

White Mischief sponsors the cheerleaders in Indian Premier League. They are popularly known as White Mischief Gals.

In 2003, Shaw Wallace extended the White Mischief brand to brandy. The company consciously decided to launch White Mischief Brandy, initially in the state of Kerala as it was the prime brandy market in India. The company also launched a White Mischief Zing, a lime flavoured vodka variant of White Mischief vodka, the same year.

In 2022, White Mischief was one of 32 popular brands sold by USL to Inbrew Beverages. This deal also included other brands like Haywards, Old Tavern, Honey Bee, Green Label, and Romanov. Inbrew Beverages, a Singapore-based company, acquired the entire business undertaking associated with these brands, including related contracts, permits, intellectual property rights, and a manufacturing facility.
