= Australian MAX =

- Type: Lager
- Manufacturer: International Breweries Limited
- Country of origin: India
- Proof (US): 7-8%

Australian MAX is a brand of strong beer brewed at the Khoday Breweries in Bangalore by the Canadian owned International Breweries Limited (IBL). Steven Judge and Peter Harvey are founders of the company.

Australian MAX has won the title of "The World's Best Strong Lager" and “Asia’s Best Strong Lager” at the World Beer Awards - 2011. The World Beer Awards is a global competition that evaluates beers from around the world and recognizes the most outstanding beers produced. The 2011 awards saw a huge growth in entries, with a record 700+ entries coming from 57 countries. All entries in the annual World Beer Awards are judged blind with regional style heats held in Europe, USA and Asia. Regional style winners are then tasted against other regional winners by an international panel of Judges, chaired by Roger Protz, in London to select the overall ‘World’s Best’. The final results were released on October 27, 2011.

== See also ==
- Beer in India
