= Allied Blenders & Distillers =

Indian-made foreign liquor company

- Type: Public
- Traded as: NSE: ABDL; BSE: 544203
- Industry: Alcoholic beverages
- Founded: 1988
- Founder: Kishore Rajaram Chhabria
- Headquarters: Mumbai, Maharashtra, India
- Area served: Worldwide
- Key people: Kishore Chhabria, (Chairman), Shekhar Ramamurthy (Executive Deputy Chairman)
- Products: Vodka; Brandy; Blended Whiskey; Rum; IMFL; Spirits; Gin
- Brands: Officer's Choice; Zoya
- Revenue: ▲₹7,196 crore (US$750 million) (FY22)
- Website: www.abdindia.com

Allied Blenders & Distillers (commonly referred to as ABD) is an Indian-made foreign liquor company, headquartered in Mumbai, India. It is a major distributor of whiskey, rum, vodka, brandy and other spirits, and exports to 22 countries around the world.

== History ==
Allied Blenders & Distillers was founded by Kishore Rajaram Chhabria in 1988 in Kolkata. Prior to this, Chhabria held the position of managing director at Shaw Wallace, a Kolkata-based Indian manufacturer production company. He noticed that the prominent frontline brands were receiving all the recognition and, in an effort to revive lesser-known names, he founded a new part of the business in Delhi and produced a new whisky.

The first brand of the company brand was Officer's Choice.

In 2010, ABD added a rum entitled Jolly Roger to its offerings, creating its own space in the rum market. The following year, in 2011, ABD made its foray into the deluxe whisky sector with the launch of Officer's Choice Blue.

In 2012, the company launched Officer's Choice Blue in Delhi. In 2013, ABD launched Kyron in the premium brandy sector.

In 2014, Allied Blenders & Distillers acquired 50% ownership rights in Dutch liquor major Herman Jansen's Mansion House brandy and Savoy Club whiskey.

In 2015, ABD acquired Shasta Biofuels, a Telangana-based integrated grain spirit distillery for Rs. 200 crore.

In May 2017, Officer's Choice Blue was launched in Nepal.

In July 2021, Shekhar Ramamurthy was appointed as the executive deputy chairman of ABD.

In 2022, the company launched its rum brand Jolly Roger in Rajasthan, Uttar Pradesh.

In 2024, the company entered the Gin space with Zoya Special Batch Gin in its new premium brands vertical. It is made from 100 percent grain and natural spirits, with delicate Juniper and 12 fine botanicals. The new gin will launch first in Gurgaon and will subsequently move to Maharashtra and major cities in other states of the country. A 750ml bottle of Zoya Special Batch Premium Gin will cost Rs.2200 in Maharashtra. The brand will also be available for global markets at the earliest.

ABD has filed draft papers to raise Rs. 2000 crore in IPO in June 2022 and in December 2022, SEBI approved the application.

ABD currently has 9 owned bottling units, 1 distilling unit and 22 non owned manufacturing units with sales across 30 States and Union Territories.

in June 2024, ABD filled for initial public offering (IPO) to raise up to $180 million. ABD said it would issue new shares worth up to $120 million as a part of the IPO.

== Sterling Reserve Cup ==
In 2022, Allied Blenders & Distillers presented Sterling Reserve Cup for Indian v/s New Zealand Cricket tournament 2022.

== Notable brands ==
Allied Blenders & Distillers manufactures brandy, whisky, rum, blended liquors, spirits, and vodka.

Whisky

- Arthaus Collective Blended Malt Scotch Whisky
- Officer's Choice
- Officer's Choice Blue
- Officer's Choice Star
- Officer’s Choice Blended Scotch Whisky
- Iconiq White
- Iconiq Winter
- Sterling Reserve Blend 7
- Sterling Reserve Blend 10
- Sterling Reserve B7 Cola Mix
- X&O Barrel
- Srishti Premium

Brandy

- Kyron Premium
- Officer's Choice Brandy
- Sterling Reserve Premium Cellar Brandy

Rum

- Jolly Roger
- Officer's Choice Rum

Vodka

- Class21

Gin

- Zoya
