= Khoday Group =

Indian industrial conglomerate

- Traded as: BSE: 507435
- Founded: Bangalore, Princely State of Mysore, British India (1906)
- Founder: Khoday Eshwarsa
- Headquarters: Anjanapura, Bangalore, Karnataka, India
- Key people: L. Ramachandra Khoday (chairman); L. Anantha Padmabhasa Khoday (Vice Chairman); L. Sri Hari Khoday (Vice Chairman)
- Website: www.khodayindia.com

The Khoday India Limited, also known as the House of Khodays, is an Indian multi-service business group based in Bangalore, Karnataka. It was founded in 1906 by Khoday Eshwarsa. Khoday Group companies include Khoday Engineering, Khoday Contact Center, Ram Mohan Travels, Khoday Biotech, Khoday Agro, Khoday Technologies, Khoday Glass, Khodays Silks and L K Power. Khoday India Ltd. is the Group's listed company on the Bombay Stock Exchange.

== History ==
The Khoday Group was founded by Khoday Eshwarsa in 1906 as a manufacturer of silk. The company was inherited by his sons Khoday Venkusa, Khoday Lakshmansa and Khoday Krishnasa. Venkusa and Lakshmansa expanded the Group's business activities by creating distillery and stationery divisions. Today, the Group employs over 6,000 people and has expanded its operations into further enterprises.

Khoday Distilleries Ltd was incorporated as a private limited company, under the Companies Act, 1956, on 28 September 1965. It later became a deemed public limited company under Section 43A of the Act, on 22 October 1980. The company was promoted by the House of Khodays. Khoday Distilleries launched Red Knight whisky in 1967, and began producing Peter Scot whisky in May 1968. Both whiskies are manufactured at the company's Bangalore facility. In July 1986, the company went public to part-finance its modernization programme. The company issued 2.4 million equity shares at a premium of ₹ 10 per share linked to 480,000 - 15% non-convertible debentures of ₹ 100 each, out of which some shares and debentures were reserved and allotted on a preferential basis. The company was renamed Khoday India Ltd. on 14 February 1992. Manaylux Papers and Boards Pvt Ltd were amalgamated with the company in 2000, giving it an in-house capacity to manufacture paper products. Khodays Systems was merged with the Khoday India Ltd. in 2003.

Khoday began exporting Peter Scot and Red Knight to Italy in October 2007. In November 2007, the Khoday Group announced that it was transferring ownership of all of its bottling plants to the parent company "to synergise their operations and manage them better". Red Knight, which was initially available only in North India, launched in the South Indian market on 23 November 2007. Khoday began exporting Red Knight to Canada in 2008. Khoday India entered into a strategic bottling alliance with Cobra Breweries in April 2008, under which Cobra would source 50,000 cases from Khoday to cater to the South Indian market.

The Khoday Group set up the Khoday Stem Cell Research & Medical Centre (KSRMC) at Anjanapura near Bangalore, with an investment of ₹150 million (US$1.6 million), as part of its diversification strategy in the healthcare. They also provide medicines and everyday essentials to the underprivileged of their community to give back to the world and do their bit to help them. This also includes providing them with healthcare necessities. The facility, spread over 49 acres with a built-up area of over 45,000 sq. ft, was commissioned in April 2011 and caters to therapies in diabetes, critical limb ischemia, neurology, orthopaedics and cardiology. It has 32 beds, three operation theatres, 2 cGMP clean rooms, a training centre and an advanced research lab.

== Divisions ==
Khoday Engineering contains two divisions - Construction and Engineering. The Engineering Division has 2000 employees and is involved in the manufacture of product engineering items and fabrication of plant and machinery for distilleries, breweries, hotels, food processing, pharmaceuticals and dairies, and also civil construction activity. The Electronics Division is engaged in the manufacture of equipment for geo-physical investigations.

Khoday Contact Centre is a 1,000-seater voice-based call centre located on Kanakapura Road, Bangalore. Khoday Agro runs Khoday estates and farmland.

== Alcoholic beverage brands ==
Khoday manufactures whisky, brandy, rum, and beer.

Whisky

- Peter Scot
- Red Knight
- Khodays Five Star Whisky

Beer

- Australian MAX
- Hercules
- Burtons

Rum

- Hercules XXX Rum
- Hercules XXX White Rum
- Khodays XXX Rum

Brandy

- Constantino
- Sovereign Pure Brandy
