= Odisha State Beverage Corporation =

State agency of Odisha, India

- Company type: Government
- Industry: Beverages
- Founded: 2001
- Headquarters: 9th Floor IDCO Towers, Bhubaneswar, Odisha, India
- Area served: Odisha
- Key people: Shri Arun Kumar Samantray; IAS, CMD
- Owner: Government of Odisha

The Odisha State Beverage Corporation or OSBC is a Public Sector Undertaking (PSU) of Government of Odisha. The OSBC was established on 30 January 2001 with the right and privileges of wholesale trade and distribution of IMFL, Beer and country spirit in the State of Odisha. The Odisha State Beverages Corporation allows the licensed suppliers or manufactures to store their beverages stocks in OSBC warehouses on prepayment of excise duty and import fees.

Odisha State Beverages Corporation has been providing funds for seminars, meetings etc. being arranged for public awareness against illegal liquor trade, identity and spurious liquor consumption.
