= 100 Pipers =

Blended Scotch Whisky

- Type: Blended Scotch Whisky
- Manufacturer: Pernod Ricard
- Origin: Scotland (bottled in India)
- Introduced: 1965; Seagram Distillers
- Alcohol by volume: 42.8%
- Related products: Black Dog; Blenders Pride; Imperial Blue; Royal Stag
- Website: 100 Pipers

100 Pipers is a brand of blended Scotch whisky produced by Pernod Ricard India Private Ltd. It is bottled and marketed in India. 100 Pipers is a blend of between 25 and 30 source whiskies that came from Scotland. Much of it comes from the Allt a'Bhainne distillery, which is also owned by Pernod Ricard and does not have its own bottling facilities. In addition to India, it is also distributed in Thailand, other Asian countries and South America. The company says it is the "No. 2 standard whisky in Asia", and the "No. 1 standard whisky" in Thailand.

== History ==
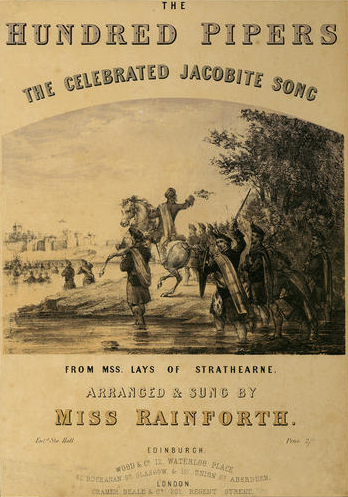
The Hundred Pipers song – sheet music cover c. 1852, song made on Jacobite rising of 1745

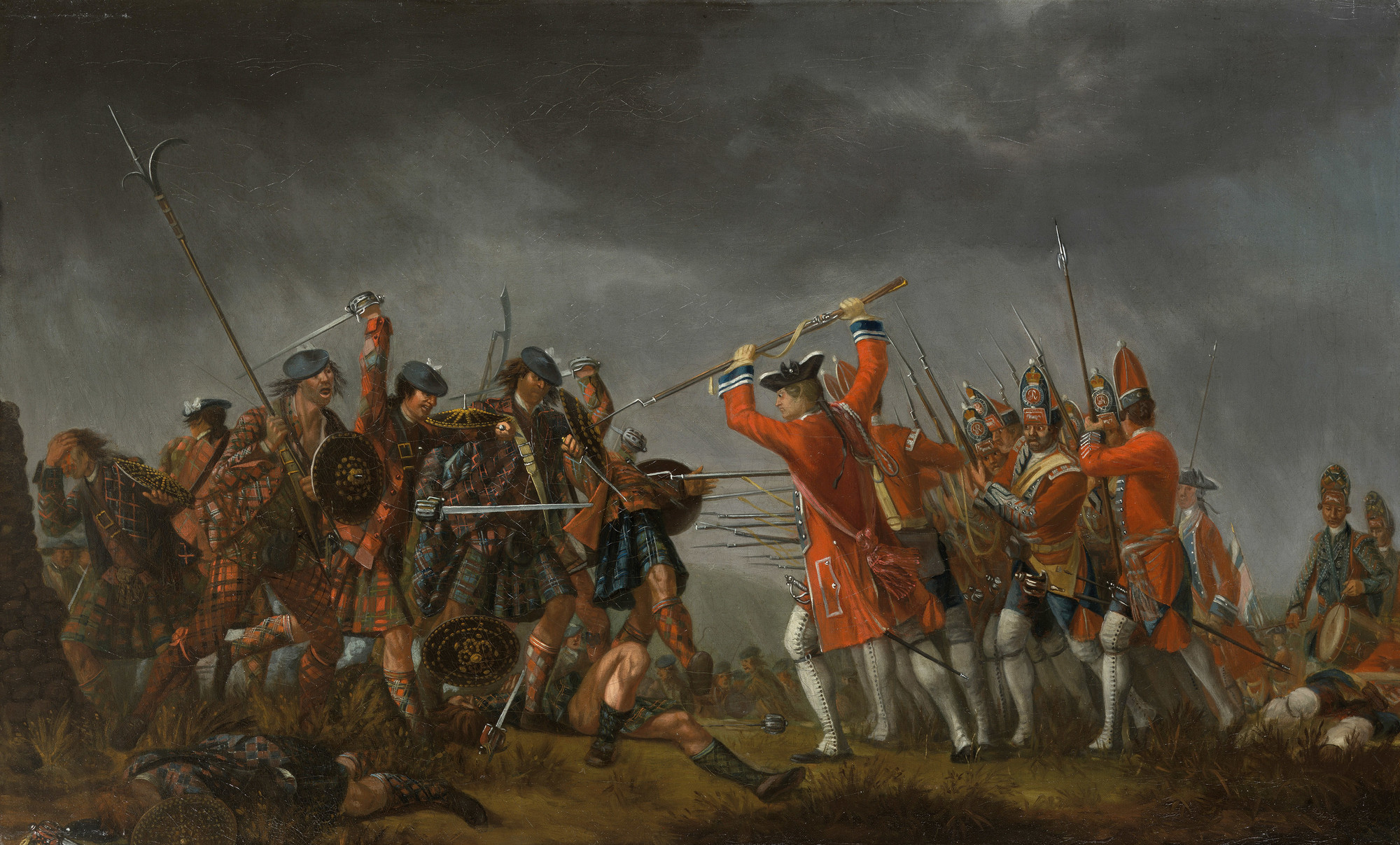
Battle of Culloden between the Jacobites and the "Redcoats"

The brand owes its name and Celtic imagery to the Scottish tradition of bagpipers leading soldiers into battle. The "100 Pipers" name in particular comes from the ballad of "The Hundred Pipers", which tells of the heroic Bonnie Prince Charlie's (1720–1788) 1745 Jacobite uprising led by a troop of 100 bagpipers.

== Marketing and market presence ==
The brand is marketed with the promotional slogan True Legend.

The website RankingtheBrands.com rated the brand value of 100 Pipers 75th in 2011 and 81st in 2014 among 10,000 spirit brands worldwide.

=== India ===
100 Pipers sponsors an annual "India Music Week" festival.

=== Thailand ===
100 Pipers is one of the best-selling whiskies in Thailand. A limited-edition "Night Bottle" for 100 Pipers was released in Thailand in 2015 with a fashion show-themed silicone wrap accompanying the bottle design.

== Awards ==
100 Pipers received a Gold Medal at "The Asian Spirits Masters 2014".
