= Surrogate advertising =

Method of indirect advertising

Surrogate advertising or Surrogate marketing is a form of advertising which is used to promote products which are banned or limited from advertising under government regulations, such as cigarettes and alcohol via advertising another product produced by the same company in order to raise brand awareness. A product in a fairly close category may be advertised, such as club soda or mineral water in the case of alcohol, or products in a completely different category, such as music CDs or playing cards. The intention is that when the brand name is mentioned, people will associate it with its main product. In India a large number of companies have used surrogate advertising, including Bacardi Blast music CD's, Bagpiper Club Soda, and Officers Choice playing cards, though the practice has since been banned under Central Consumer Protection Authority guidelines since June 2022.

The origin of surrogate advertising can be traced to Britain, where housewives protested against liquor advertisements which appealed to their husbands. Companies circumvented the ban by instead promoting fruit juices and soda under the same brand names.

== By country ==
=== Canada ===
In Canada, in 1988 tobacco product manufacturers were banned from directly advertising their products, but were permitted to continue sponsoring events, on condition that any promotional material reference only the corporate name of the manufacturer and not the brand names of their products. Tobacco companies got around this rule by incorporating new subsidiaries that matched the names of their key products, which in turn sponsored events such as the du Maurier Ltd. Open tennis tournament. The subsidiaries adopted the respective trade dresses of the products as their corporate colours, which were also used in event imagery, and on various promotional products like T-shirts and towels. This form of marketing was eventually prohibited by the Canadian government effective October 1, 2003.

=== India ===
India has held a strong stance on the ban on advertising tobacco and liquor products since 1995. The ban was enforced after extensive research from the Indian Ministry of Health found that cigarettes and liquor have adverse effects on a person's health. In addition to this, the Indian government holds the notion that these products are especially harmful to a person's mental health, making them lazy and unmotivated. The combination of these factors led to an eventual ban on advertising these products throughout its media channels.

However, the negative outlook on advertising these products can be traced back to 1975, when the Indian government introduced the Cigarette advertising act, forcing tobacco companies to display health warnings on the packaging and advertisements for cigarettes. The Indian government and health ministry continued to push for stronger restrictions on the advertising of tobacco and liquor until its eventual complete ban in 1995. However, the increase in population saw the sales of tobacco and liquor increase at an exponential rate. Therefore, companies were forced to seek alternative means of advertising, which led to the eventual creation of surrogate advertising in India.

Some of the first evidence of surrogate advertising was seen by the Indian tobacco Company ‘Azad Bidi, which sponsored an international cricket match in India. In India, extensive surveys resulted in similar findings which showed that liquor ads had a direct influence on consumers' purchasing behavior. Soon afterwards, the Cable TV Regulation Act banned liquor and cigarette advertisements; thus, India gradually adopted surrogate advertisements.

The tobacco industry is a prominent contributor to the practice of surrogate advertising. These advertisements promote alternate products, such as mouth fresheners or cardamom, in place of their primary tobacco products, which are subject to stringent government regulations. Many leading tobacco companies in India rely on surrogate advertising to indirectly market their products while adhering to legal restrictions. With significant financial resources at their disposal, these companies often enlist high-profile celebrities to feature in these advertisements, thereby enhancing their reach and appeal.

Such companies usually either go for brand extension and promote the extended products, or promote certain products which might not be available in the market. The excessive pressure of the ban forced companies to focus more on brand building and thus liquor companies started sponsoring and hosting glamorous events, yet many others started distributing t-shirts, caps, key chains, and drinking glasses with the brand name displayed on these products.

Surrogate advertising mandates a requirement for the product being marketed to have a revenue model associated with it. On 7 October 2022, the consumer affairs ministry of India issued notices to 6 alcohol and tobacco brands due to their surrogate advertising. Central Consumer Protection Authority (CCPA) has sent notices to Premium Black, Sterling Reserve, Seagram's Imperial Blue, Vimal Pan Masala, Rajnigandha Pan Masala and Kamala Pasand Pan Masala and told them to give answers on violating advertising guidelines. CCPA also asked them to discontinue these ads with immediate effect.

Many Betting websites, and mobile apps do surrogate advertising in India. For example, they open similar name websites as apps to advertise their main betting company. Some examples include 1xBet running 1XNews, and 1XBat, extensively advertised as sporting blog and sportswear brands respectively. 1xBet signed Indian former cricketer Yuvraj Singh as their brand ambassador. Fair Play, and Betway also use similar type of tactics, to attract people to their main betting app, website. They are using national TV channels such as Star Sports etc. and YouTube channels, online media for advertising. But due to weak Indian laws these illegal betting apps are running and advertising in India.

With the Indian government now enforcing a ban on surrogate advertisements, companies are turning to event sponsorship, event organising, corporate films and more and more innovative integrated marketing communications strategies, though surrogate advertising is still a common practice.

Brand extensions, which are the expansion of a company towards products it did not sell previously, are allowed and somewhat common. The main difference between this practice and surrogate advertising is that surrogate advertising does not want to sell the supposed new product and it actually wants to promote a product whose advertising is prohibited.

=== Indonesia ===
An Indonesian football team was the focus of an inquiry in 2023 due to officials regarding their sponsors as a gambling company, despite being registered as a news site.

=== United States ===
In 2023, the American beer brand Coors Light created an advertisement with NFL player Patrick Mahomes, promoting a "Coors Light Bear" instead of the beer of the same name. This was done to get around NFL rules prohibiting players from promoting beer. A similar ad was made previously, with Mahomes promoting a flashlight called "The Coors Light".

=== International ===
Mission Winnow is owned by Phillip Morris International to get around the tobacco sponsorship ban, especially in Formula 1 for Scuderia Ferrari.

== Effectiveness ==
Surrogate advertisements impact a consumer's buying decisions and inform consumers about the leading liquor brands and thus promote sales.

According to the inferences drawn from several surveys and interviews in India, 42 out of 50 people could understand the actual liquor or tobacco product being advertised.

== See also ==
- Fraud
- Misleading advertising
- False advertising
