= Wine and Spirits Wholesalers of America =

Wine and Spirits Wholesalers of America, Inc. (WSWA) is the industry trade group representing wine and spirits wholesalers in the United States. WSWA is headquartered in Washington, D.C. It was founded in 1943 (83 years ago) and has 360 member companies in all 50 states and the District of Columbia. It is dedicated to advancing the interests and independence of wholesale distributors and/or brokers of wine and/or spirits. Headquartered in Washington, D.C., WSWA provides its members with representation before Congress, executive agencies, regulatory bodies, courts, state-based wine and spirits associations and other alcohol beverage industry organizations. In addition, WSWA offers a wide range of services in the areas of public affairs, social responsibility issues and business networking opportunities. The group claims its members distribute over 70 percent of all wines and spirits sold at wholesale in the United States. The group has 501(c)(6) nonprofit trade association status.

== WSWA Membership ==
For wine and spirits wholesalers, membership in WSWA supports wholesaler advocacy through federal and state affairs lobbying, provides socially responsible wine and spirits public affairs initiatives, access to industry research, studies, and surveys while providing direct business and networking opportunities at the wine and spirits industry's premier trade show, the WSWA Annual Convention and Exposition. WSWA further develops industry-specific management development through their annual CLD Leadership Skills conference.

WSWA Associate Membership provides suppliers, wineries, brokers, importers, and other companies providing products and services to the wine and spirits industry with numerous ways to participate and foster relationships with wine and spirits wholesalers and other industry organizations. This is provided through industry recognition, marketing and promotional opportunities, participation in the WSWA Annual Convention and Exposition, networking events, and sponsorship options, among other direct benefits.
