= Shaw Wallace =

Indian liquor manufacturer

Shaw Wallace & Company Limited
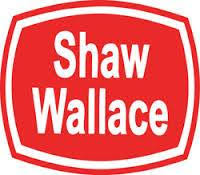
- Type: Public company
- Traded as: BSE: 501379; NSE: SHAWALLACEBE
- Industry: Beverages
- Founded: 1886
- Founder: Robert Gordon Shaw; Charles William Wallace
- Defunct: 2008
- Fate: Merged with United Spirits Ltd
- Headquarters: Wallace House, Kolkata, West Bengal, India
- Products: Brewery, alcoholic beverages

Shaw Wallace & Company Limited, abbreviated to SWC, was an Indian liquor manufacturer headquartered in the Wallace House in Kolkata, West Bengal. It was established in 1886 by Robert Gordon Shaw and Charles William Wallace. It was involved in the production and sales of Indian Made Foreign Liquor (IMFL). The two biggest brands of SWC were Royal Challenge whisky and Director's Special whisky.

In mid-2005, SWC's spirits business was acquired by the United Breweries Group (UB Group) and its breweries and beer business was acquired by SABMiller. On 1 April 2008, Shaw Wallace was merged with United Spirits Ltd, a subsidiary of the UB Group.

== History ==
Shaw Wallace & Company Limited was established in 1886 by Robert Gordon Shaw and Charles William Wallace (1855–1916). (Wallace's legacy established the Charles Wallace India Trust, which today provides scholarships for mid-career Indians to spend time in the United Kingdom.) Prior to 1999, SWC was into diversified businesses, which it shed as part of a restructuring plan. It 1999, it sold Calcutta Chemicals Ltd and Detergents India Ltd to Henkel SPIC.

On 21 March 2005, UB Group increased their ownership of Shaw Wallace to 54.54%. Since Manu Chhabria had died three years earlier, the deal was approved by his widow Vidya Chhabria. SWC's breweries and beer business was acquired by SABMiller. Royal Challenge beer, which is mainly sold in the state of Andhra Pradesh, is with SABMiller.

During 2006–07, Shaw Wallace & Company Ltd recorded a net sales turnover of Rs 1388.5 million, (Rs 1155.2 million in 2005–06), total income of Rs 2321.5 million (Rs 2933.8 million in 2005–06), while the profit after tax was Rs 820.7 million (Rs 468.6 million in 2005–06). Director S.R. Gupte announced on 29 September 2007 that merger talks would soon get underway between United Spirits and Shaw Wallace. The merger was later approved by the Shaw Wallace board of directors.

== Sega Mega Drive ==
In India, distribution of the Sega Mega Drive was handled by Shaw Wallace Electronics, with the products being sold for ₹18,000 (US$190). Sega entered the partnership in the northern hemisphere in April 1994. Shaw Wallace started manufacturing consoles in India from spring 1995, because Sega wanted to circumvent an 80% import tariff. The distribution of Sega products was acquired by Maze Marketing (now Mitashi Edutainment) in 1995.
