= United Spirits =

Indian alcoholic beverages company

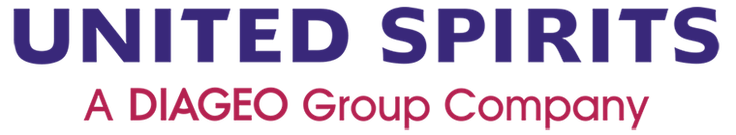
- Type: Public
- Traded as: BSE: 532432; NSE: UNITDSPR
- Industry: Drink industry
- Predecessor: McDowell and Company
- Founded: 1826; 200 years ago Fort St. George, Madras, Madras Presidency, British India
- Founder: Angus McDowell
- Headquarters: UB Tower, No. 24, Vittal Mallya Road, Bangalore, Karnataka, India
- Area served: Worldwide
- Key people: Praveen Someshwar (MD & CEO); Prathamesh Mishra (MD of Diageo Korea & Japan)
- Products: Alcoholic beverages: spirits, beer and wine
- Revenue: ▲₹12,069 crore (US$1.3 billion) (2025)
- Operating income: ▲₹2,243 crore (US$240 million) (2025)
- Net income: ▲₹1,582 crore (US$170 million) (2025)
- Total assets: ▲₹13,248 crore (US$1.4 billion) (2025)
- Total equity: ▲₹8,104 crore (US$870 million) (2025)
- Number of employees: 3,200 (2022)
- Parent: Diageo (54.8%)
- Website: www.diageoindia.com
- Footnotes; Financials as of 31 March 2025.

United Spirits Limited (USL) is an Indian alcoholic beverages company, and the world's second-largest spirits company by volume. It is a subsidiary of Diageo, and headquartered at UB Tower in Bengaluru, Karnataka. USL exports its products to over 37 countries.

According to the official website of the company, as of March 2013, USL has more than 140 liquor brands, of which 15 brands each sell more than one million cases annually while 3 brands each sell more than 10 million cases annually.

== History ==
The company originated as a trading company called McDowell and Company (also known as McDowell & Co, McDowell or McDowell's), founded in India in 1826 by Angus McDowell, a Scot. He set up a warehouse near Fort St. George, Madras (now Chennai). The company imported liquor, tobacco products, and other consumer goods into India to serve the needs of British people stationed there. McDowell & Company Limited was incorporated as a company in 1898, with an initial capital of ₹8 lakh (equivalent to ₹34 crore or US$3.7 million in 2026) as 4,000 preferred shares and 4,000 common shares of ₹100 (equivalent to ₹43,000 or US$460 in 2026) each. The company's principal shareholders were A.M. Hooper, G.D. Coleman, and G.A. Ruppell.

The Vittal Mallya-run United Breweries Group bought McDowell and Company in 1951. In 1959, Mallya established the company's first distillery at Cherthala, Kerala on the banks of the Vembanad lake. McDowell's began bottling Bisquit Brandy and Dorville French Brandy, from imported concentrates, becoming the first company to manufacture Indian Made Foreign Liquor (IMFL). The company opened India's first distillation plant to manufacture extra-neutral alcohol (ENA) at Cherthala in 1961. The plant began bottling products for Herbertsons Limited of the Anglo Thai Group that same year. The company launched Golden Grape Brandy, its first original product, in 1962. The company launched McDowell's No.1 Brandy in 1963–64 when their contract with Herbertsons expired. In the early 1960s, the company acquired Carew & Co and Phipson & Co, manufacturers of rum, gin, and other hard liquors in 1963–64.

The company launched McDowell's No.1 whisky in 1968, and commissioned new distilleries in Hyderabad, Ponda (Goa), and Hathidah (Bihar) over the next few years. In the late 1970s, distilleries were acquired in Udaipur, Alwar, Mirganj, and Serampore, and a plant was built in Pondicherry. The company bought out Herbertsons in 1973. Mallya's son, Vijay Mallya, took over as director of McDowell's the same year and assumed chairmanship of UB Group and McDowell's after Vittal Mallya died in 1983. McDowell's moved its headquarters from Madras to Bengaluru in 1987. The company established a technical center for product and process development research in Bangalore in 1989. McDowell's No.1 Rum was launched in 1990. McDowell's acquired the spirits business and manufacturing facility of Forbes Campbell & Company Limited. McDowell's formed United Distillers India Limited, India's first joint venture in the alcoholic beverages industry, with United Distillers of the United Kingdom in 1991–92. McDowell's Signature whisky was launched in 1994. In 1995, Carew Phipson Limited, Consolidated Distilleries Ltd, and several other companies were merged into McDowell's, as S.S. Gandhi handed the reigns of the company to Vijay Rekhi. The company was incorporated as McDowell Spirits Ltd in 1999. The name was changed to McDowell & Company Ltd on 1 April 2000. McDowell Alcobev became a wholly owned subsidiary of McDowell & Company in 2002. In the same year, the company acquired Phipson Distillery, McDowell International Brands Ltd, and most of Triumph Distilleries & Vinters Pvt Ltd. McDowell launched Derby Special Whisky in 2003 and Old Cask rum in 2004.

On 21 March 2005, McDowell & Company entered into an agreement with Jumbo World Holdings Limited (JWHL) in Dubai to acquire Shaw Wallace. The board of Shaw Wallace approved the merger of the company with USL and fixed the appointed date of the merger as 1 April 2008 subject to approvals. In 2006, McDowell & Co Limited, Herbertsons Limited, Triumph Distillers and Vintners Private Limited, Baramati Grape Industries India Limited, Shaw Wallace Distilleries Limited and four other companies are merged to form United Spirits Limited under the helm of Vijay Rekhi. Bouvet Ladubay, a subsidiary of France-based Taittinger was acquired the same year.

The UB Group purchased Whyte & Mackay in May 2007 for £595 million. USL also acquired Liquidity Inc., makers of Pinky Vodka, in 2007. USL launched Black Dog 18 YO and Four Seasons Barrique Reserve in 2009–10, and McDowell's No 1 Platinum, 100% grain-based whisky, in 2011.

In 2011, eclipsed Diageo as the world's largest spirits company by volume sold. Later that year, then President and MD Vijay Rekhi stepped down.

On 27 May 2013, Diageo acquired a 10% stake in United Spirits at a cost of ₹20,927,196,000 (US$220 million). It also separately acquired an additional 58,668 shares for ₹ 85,778,082. On 4 July 2013, Diageo bought an additional 14.98% of the company for ₹31.35 billion (US$330 million). Diageo acquired an additional 21.77 million shares at a cost of ₹1,440 (US$15) per share in an off-market deal from United Spirits' promoters, raising its holdings to 25.02 percent of the company. Following that purchase, Diageo held 36.3 million shares in USL, acquired at a cost of ₹52,358.5 million (US$560 million), making it the largest shareholder. Under pressure from Diageo, some substantial changes to the management structure of the firm began to take place in 2013.

In 2014, Diageo's shareholdings rose to 54.8% of USL.

In early 2014, Whyte & Mackay, which had been purchased by UB Group in 2007, was sold to Philippines-based Emperador for £430 million.

On 5 November 2017, the Paradise Papers, a set of confidential electronic documents relating to offshore investment, revealed that United Spirits with three other subsidiaries based in the UK were allegedly involved with diverting funds amounting to $1.5 billion.

=== List of Managing Directors ===
- SS Gandhi (As MD of McDowell's) (-1996)
- Vijay Rekhi (1996-2011)
- Ashok Capoor (2011-2014)
- Anand Kripalu (2014-2021)
- Hina Nagarajan (2021-2025)
- Praveen Someshwar (2025-Present)

== Technical centre ==
The USL technical centre was opened in 1989 in Bangalore, and is recognised by the Department of Scientific & Industrial Research (DSIR) as an in-house Research & Development laboratory.

== United Spirits brands ==
USL manufactures Indian whisky, Scotch whisky, brandy, rum, vodka, gin and wine.

Indian whisky

- Antiquity
- Bagpiper
- McDowell's No.1
- McDowell's No.1 Platinum
- McDowell's Single Malt
- Royal Challenge
- Royal Challenge American Pride
- Signature

Scotch whisky

- Black Dog

Wine

- Bouvet Ladubay
- Four Seasons

Vodka

- Pinky
- Romanov
- White Mischief

Brandy

- Honey Bee
- McDowell's VSOP

Rum

- McDowell's No.1 Celebration

Gin

- Blue Riband

== Distillery locations ==
USL owns several distilleries throughout India, and also owns one unit in Nepal. Besides these, USL also has several contract and associate distilleries in India, and one in Nepal.

Operational USL owned units

- Malkajgiri, Hyderabad, Telangana
- Nacharam, Hyderabad, Telangana
- Bethora-Ponda, Goa
- Kumbalgodu, Bangalore, Karnataka
- Aurangabad, Maharashtra
- Baramati, Maharashtra
- Nasik, Maharashtra
- Alwar, Rajasthan
- Nimapara, Odisha
- Pioneer Distillery, Nanded, Maharashtra
- Asansol, West Bengal

Contract and associate units

- Rhizome Distilleries Pvt. Ltd (Hyderabad, Telangana)
- Esveear Dist (Tirupati, Andhra Pradesh)
- Continental Distillery (Vijayawada, Andhra Pradesh)
- North East Distilleries Pvt Ltd (Guwahati, Assam)
- Surma Distillery Pvt Ltd (Silchar, Assam)
- M T M Wines & Bottlers Pvt Limited (Naharlagun, Arunachal Pradesh)
- Aegis Beverages (P) Ltd (Bilaspur, Chhattisgarh)
- Khemani Distilleries Pvt Ltd (Daman)
- Saraya Industries Ltd (New Delhi)
- Mandovi Distilleries & Breweries Pvt Ltd (Goa)
- A B Sugars Ltd (Haryana)
- Sir Shadilal Distillery & Chemical Works (Haryana)
- Trishul Bottlers (Jammu and Kashmir)
- Ajantha Bottlers & Blenders Pvt Ltd (Ranchi, Jharkhand)
- Ambient Liquors Pvt Ltd (Jharkhand)
- Karnataka Breweries & Distilleries Ltd (Bangalore, Karnataka)
- Seven Seas Distillery Pvt Ltd (Mannuthy, Thrissur, Kerala)
- Ajantha Distilleries (Nagpur, Maharashtra)
- Rainbow Distilleries Pvt Ltd (Nagpur, Maharashtra)
- Jubilant Organosys Limited (Pune, Maharashtra)
- Ravi-Kumar Distillery (Pondicherry)
- Vinbros Dist (Pondicherry)
- Mount Distillery (Sikkim)
- Golden Midas Dist (Chennai, Tamil Nadu)
- Shiva Distillery (Coimbatore, Tamil Nadu)
- Gemini Distilleries (Tripura) Pvt Ltd (Tripura)
- United Brothers Distilleries Private Limited (Naharlagun, Arunachal Pradesh)
- Himalayan Distillery Pvt Ltd (Nepal)
