= McDowell's No.1 =

Brand of Indian Spirits

- Product type: Spirits, bottled water, soda
- Current owner: United Spirits Ltd (USL) (Diageo)
- Country: India
- Introduced: 1963–64
- Tagline: No1 Yaari Ka No1 Spirit
- Website: diageoindia.com

McDowell's No.1 is an Indian brand of spirits manufactured by United Spirits Limited (USL), a subsidiary of Diageo. It is USL's flagship brand and the largest umbrella spirits brand in the world, comprising three categories – whisky, brandy and rum (under the name McDowell's No.1 Celebration). The brand also has bottled water and soda. The brand began with the launch of McDowell's No.1 Brandy in 1963–64. The brand's slogan is No1 Yaari Ka No1 Spirit.

== Origin of name ==
The name McDowell came from Scottish distiller Angus McDowell, who established McDowell and Company in India in 1898, an overseas branch of McDowell of Scotland. In 1951, McDowell and Company was acquired by the UB Group of Vittal Mallya.

== History ==
In 1959, Mallya established McDowell and Company's first distillery at Cherthala, Kerala, and began bottling Bisquit Brandy and Dorville French Brandy from imported concentrates. The company commissioned India's first distillation plant at Cherthala in 1961 to produce extra neutral alcohol (ENA). The McDowell's No.1 brand began with the launch of McDowell's No.1 Brandy in 1963-64 following the termination of the import contract for No.1 Bisquit Brandy. McDowell's No.1 Whisky was launched in 1968 and McDowell's No.1 Rum was launched in Celebration (dark) and Caribbean (white) variants in 1990–91.

The company was incorporated in 1999 as McDowell Spirits Ltd and changed its name from McDowell Spirits Ltd to McDowell and Company Ltd on 1 April 2000. The company changed its name again, to the current United Spirits Limited (USL), on 17 October 2006. In 2000, Claessens International, a London-based design consulting firm, was hired to revamp the design and packaging of the series.

== Whisky ==
McDowell's No.1 Reserve Whisky was launched in 1968 and is a blend of imported scotch and Indian malt whiskies. It is sold in several regions outside India, including Africa, Canada, the Far East, Japan, the Middle East, and the United Arab Emirates.

McDowell's No.1 Diet Mate, which the company claims is the world's first diet whisky, is a variant of McDowell's No.1 Whisky. It was launched in 2006. It is sold in pint, nip, quart, and 750 ml bottles, at a cost 5% higher than McDowell's No.1 Whisky. The product was initially launched in Mumbai and Thane but later expanded to other markets. Debashish Shyam, then General Manager (Marketing) of UB Group Spirits Division, stated that "Diet Mate is not a low-calorie whisky but has ingredients that increase metabolism."

== Rum ==
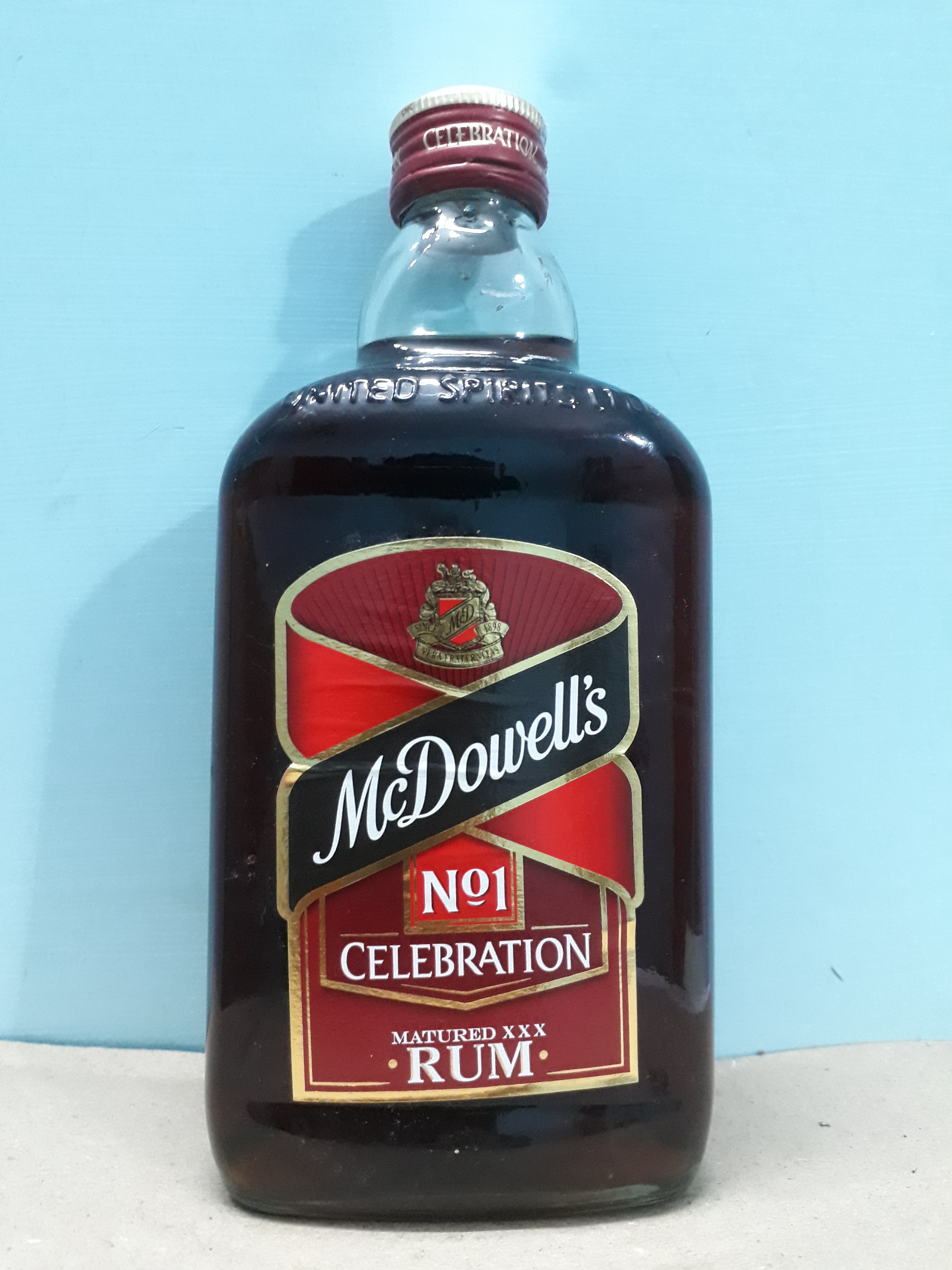
McDowell No. 1 Rum

McDowell's No.1 Rum was launched in Celebration (dark) and Caribbean (white) variants in 1990–91. It is sold in 13 countries. In 2015, it overtook Bacardi as the world's best-selling rum brand.

== Brandy ==
McDowell's No.1 Brandy was launched in 1963-64 and was the first McDowell's No.1 branded product. The brand created the template for the many No. 1 brands that the company would launch later. It is the largest selling brandy in the world by volume. It sold 4.6 million cases in 2004 and 13.7 million cases in 2009.

== Sales ==
McDowell's No.1 is the largest selling umbrella spirits brand in the world. It sold over 13.5 million cases in 2003–04, 6.07 million cases in 2005 and 8.65 million cases in 2006. It had sales of 27.5 million cases in 2007–08, and sold 14.3 million cases of whisky, 13.8 million cases of rum, and 11.7 million of brandy in 2010.

The brand achieved retail sales worth $3.8 billion in 2012–13, selling nearly half a billion 750 ml bottles of its whisky, rum and brandy, making the brand the largest alcoholic beverage franchise in India by volume and value.

The following table shows the annual sales of McDowell's No.1:

Year	Sales (in million cases)		
Year	Whisky	Rum	Brandy
2001-02	3.8		
2002-03	4		
2003-04	5.5		
2005	6.1		
2004			4.6
2006	8.7	6.2	
2007	11.5	7.6	
2008	13.4	9.7	
2009	13.5	11.2	13.7
2010	14.3	13.9	
2011	16.1	15.6	
2012	19.5	14	17.8

== Marketing ==
McDowell's No.1 is mainly advertised through Bollywood and cricket, as well as sports and music events. The brand has associated itself with Bollywood films such as Devdas, Road, Kaante and Stumped, through its Mera No 1 Entertainment banner.

On 21 August 2009, the brand announced a tie-up with Shillong Lajong F.C., the first team to qualify for the I-League 2009-2010 from North-East India. It signed Mahendra Singh Dhoni to a three-year endorsement deal, worth ₹26 crore (US$2.8 million), for McDowell's No 1 soda.

McDowell's No.1 Whisky releases special packs to commemorate Holi, Diwali and New Year. The brand has sponsored several music concerts in India featuring artists such as Mark Knopfler, Enrique Iglesias, Elton John, Shankar–Ehsaan–Loy, Vishal Dadlani and Shekhar Rajviani, and Rabbi Shergill, Strings, Bombay Vikings, Shibani Kashyap, Abhijeet Sawant, Kailash Kher and Mika Singh.

== Awards ==
McDowell's No.1 Platinum Rare Whisky won the Silver Award (91 pts) at the International Wine and Spirit Competition.

McDowell's No.1 Platinum Whisky won the Silver Award in 2014 and the Bronze Award in 2019 at the International Spirits Challenge.
