= Indian whisky =

Type of distilled liquor produced in India

- Type: Distilled beverage
- Manufacturer: 13
- Origin: India
- Introduced: 1855
- Alcohol by volume: 42%–71%
- Colour: Caramel to pale yellow
- Flavour: Fruity and sweet (Vanilla. caramel, citrus, spices, chocolate, honey)
- Variants: Single malt, Grain whisky
- Related products: New world whisky
- Website: https://indianmaltwhisky.org/

Indian whisky is a New world whisky that is mostly Indian-made foreign liquor and is labelled as "whisky”. Blends based on neutral spirits are commonly distilled from fermented molasses with only about 10 to 12 per cent creating traditional malt whisky. Outside India, such a drink would more likely be labelled a rum.

Molasses-based blends made up 90 per cent of the spirits consumed as "whisky" in India in 2004, although whisky wholly distilled from malt and other grains, was also manufactured and sold. By 2004, shortages of wheat had been overcome and India was one of the largest producers. Amrut, the first single malt whisky produced in India, was launched in Glasgow, Scotland, in 2004. After expanding in Europe, it was launched in India in 2010.

Indian single malts comprised 15% of the local market in 2017, increasing to 33% in 2022. In the three years to 2022, sales of Indian malts increased by an annual average of 42%, compared with 7% for imported rivals.

== History ==
The drinking of Scotch whisky was introduced to India in the nineteenth century, during the British Raj. In the late 1820s, Edward Dyer moved from England to set up the first brewery in India at Kasauli. The brewery was soon shifted to nearby Solan (close to the British summer capital Shimla), as there was an abundant supply of fresh springwater there. The Kasauli Brewery site was converted to a distillery becoming India's first distillery, which is currently operated by Mohan Meakin. Production of alcohol from grain was hampered by shortage of extra grain, due to food shortages. Allowing grains to be used for alcohol manufacture is a controversial subject in India, due to poverty and alcohol's ambivalent reputation. Economic liberalisation in the 1990s led to the moderate reduction of import duties, to about 35%, giving distillers access to better technology.

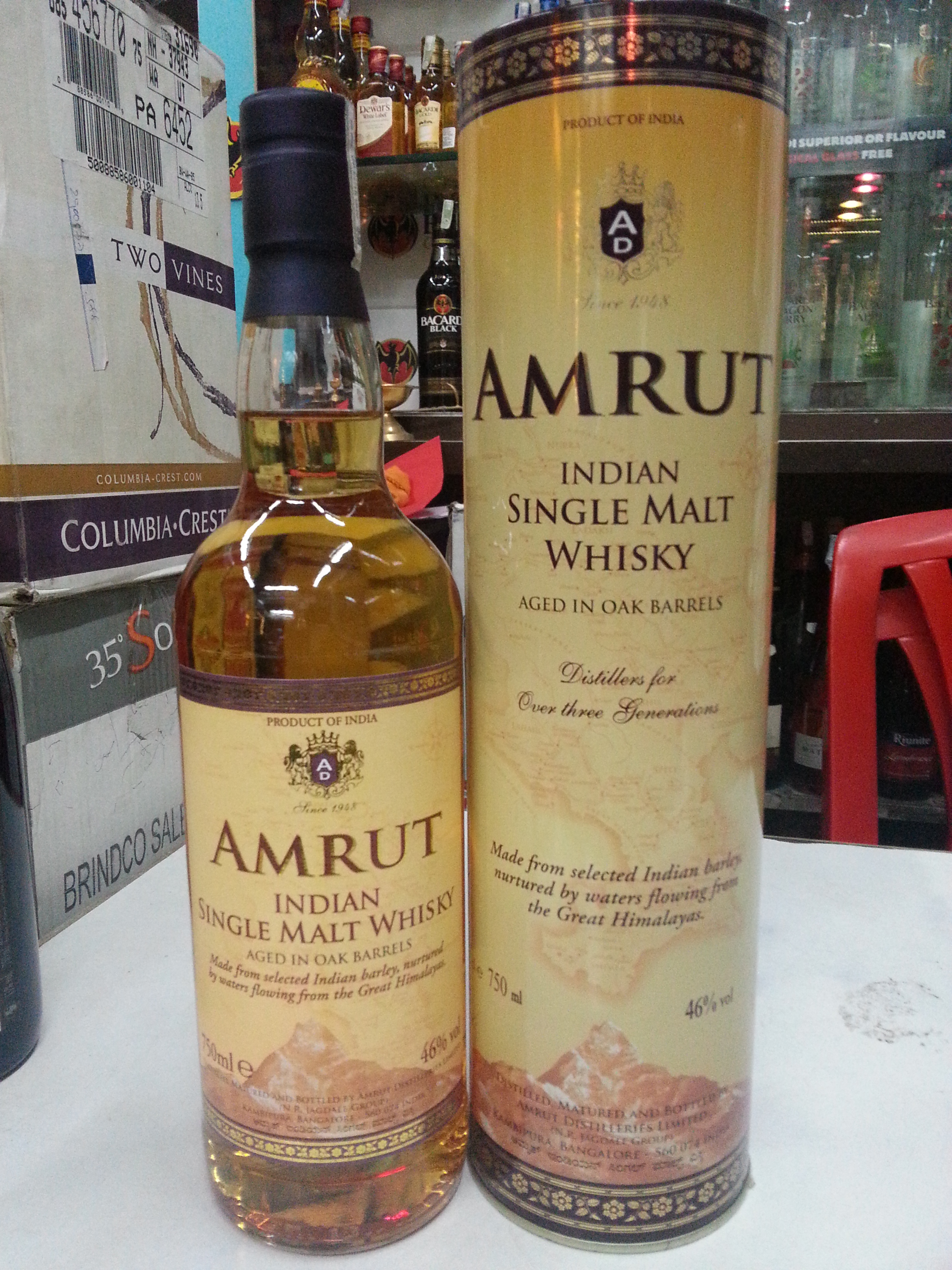
Amrut single malt whisky

The manufacture of whisky from malted grains in India was pioneered by Amrut Distilleries in 1982. Amrut Distilleries began procuring barley from farmers in Haryana, Punjab and Rajasthan, in addition to molasses, and launched Prestige Blended Malt Whisky in the Canteen Stores Department in 1986. The first batch of single malt whisky was ready within 18 months. Because India had no culture of consuming single malts at the time, the company did not consider bottling it as a single malt. Instead, the whisky was blended with alcohol distilled from sugarcane to produce MaQintosh Premium Whisky. According to Neelakanta Jagdale, "The alcoholic beverages industry was not a priority in the country. Although we received help to a certain extent from the Central Food Technological Research Institute (CFTRI), we had to find our own ways to learn about improved distilling methods". Amrut Distilleries launched Amrut, the first single malt whisky to be made in India, on 24 August 2004. The production of Amrut single malt whisky was the result of the distillery having malt that was ageing far in excess of what was needed for its medium range Prestige Malt Whisky. Initially, Amrut aged malt whisky for around a year before blending it. However, due to changing customer preferences, less malt whisky was being added into blended variants. Surinder Kumar, the master blender at Amrut Distilleries, has estimated that because of climate differences, one year of barrel ageing in India is equal to three years of ageing in Scotland.

John Distilleries had been making blended whisky since its foundation, but decided to manufacture single malt whisky in 2008 in an attempt to enter the premium end of the market. The first bottling of Paul John whisky, branded "Paul John Single Cask 161 Whisky", was launched on 4 October 2012.

Economic liberalisation also lead to the entry of foreign companies to the market, whose brands were seen as more authentic and attractive by affluent Indian consumers. This led several Indian manufacturers to acquire foreign liquor companies. Under Vijay Mallya's direction, the Indian company United Spirits Limited acquired a number of noted whisky brands and distilleries in Scotland, including Dalmore, Isle of Jura and Whyte & Mackay. In 2012, Diageo acquired a 55% stake in United Spirits. Since export of single malt whiskies in any container other than sealed bottles labelled for retail sale was banned by the UK Scotch Whisky Regulations 2009, a limited amount of exportable Scotch whiskies are used in Indian blended whiskies. Whyte & Mackay has since been sold as of 2014 to Emperador, a company based in the Philippines.

== Definition ==
=== Current ===
According to the Scotch Whisky Association's 2013 annual report, unlike in the European Union (EU), "there is no compulsory definition of whisky in India, and the Indian voluntary standard does not require whisky to be distilled from cereals or to be matured. Very little Indian 'whisky' qualifies as whisky in the EU owing to the use of molasses or neutral alcohol, limited maturation (if any) and the use of flavourings. Such spirits are, of course, considerably cheaper to produce than genuine whisky."

=== Legal ===
On 20 February 2025 the Indian Malt Whisky Association submitted a request to have Indian whisky recognised with a geographical indication, this includes a requirement for whiskies to be made from malt barley and distilled in a copper pot still at a single distillery.

== Domestic market ==
In terms of volume, India is the biggest consumer of whisky in the world. It has a complex tax structure with taxes levelled by both Central and State Governments. Import taxes are applied by the Central Government on imported spirits. State level taxes are levied by each individual State, with taxation levels and methods varying significantly. The sale of alcohol is also prohibited in some States.

Whisky accounts for nearly 60% of the Indian-made foreign liquor market. India accounted for nearly half the global whisky market by volume in 2010. The market is generally divided into segments based on price.

== Awards ==
1. Rampur Asava Indian Single Malt Whisky by Radico Khaitan has been awarded the title of Best World Whisky in the 2023 edition of the prestigious John Barleycorn Awards.
2. The Godawan 100 Single Malt won the best single malt at London Spirits Competition (LSC) 2024

== Trade controversy ==
The consumption of native-distilled, molasses-based whisky in India is encouraged by tariff barriers of up to 150% that impose a significant markup on imported whiskies in India. Imported Scotch whisky bottled under its own brand names makes up only 1% of the total market share. The substantial tax markup on imported whiskies has been categorised by the Scotch Whisky Association (SWA) as "pure protectionism". Indian distillers accuse the European Union of erecting its own sort of trade barriers by means of rules that forbid the marketing of molasses-based spirits as "whisky". Mallya has objected to the EU's refusal of entry to molasses-based whiskies, claiming that the "imposition of British imperialism is unacceptable". In a lawsuit brought in India by the SWA, the Delhi High Court in April 2006 enjoined Indian whisky manufacturers from labelling their product with the words "Scot" or "Scotch". However, on 27 May 2008, the Supreme Court ruled in favour of distiller Khoday India Limited, allowing the company to keep its Peter Scot whisky brand trademark.

In 2019, India was the world's second largest Scotch whisky market by volume (the equivalent of 131 million 70 cl bottles exported) and 7th largest by value (£166 million).

== Manufacturers ==
Following is a list of whisky producers in India in alphabetical order. The location of the company headquarters is given in brackets.

- ADS Spirits (Jhajjar, Haryana)
- Amrut Distilleries (Bangalore, Karnataka)
- Allied Blenders & Distillers
- Diageo India Pvt Ltd. (Mumbai, Maharashtra)
- indri whisky
- John Distilleries (Bangalore, Karnataka)
- Khoday India Limited (Bangalore, Karnataka)
- Ocean King Distillers, (Goa)
- Pincon Spirit Limited, (Kolkata, West Bengal)
- Mohan Meakin (Ghaziabad, Uttar Pradesh)
- Radico Khaitan (Rampur, Uttar Pradesh)
- Seagram Manufacturing Ltd, owned by Pernod Ricard
- Suntory Jim Beam India Ltd, owned by Suntory Global Spirits
- United Spirits Limited (Bangalore, Karnataka)

=== Defunct ===
The following manufacturers have ceased operations.

- Shaw Wallace (Kolkata, West Bengal) – Merged with United Spirits Ltd

== See also ==
- Outline of whisky
- Desi daru
- Scotch whiskey
- Indian beer
- Indian wine
- Indian Malt Whisky Association
- List of vedic and ayurvedic alcoholic drinks
