= List of Indian drinks =

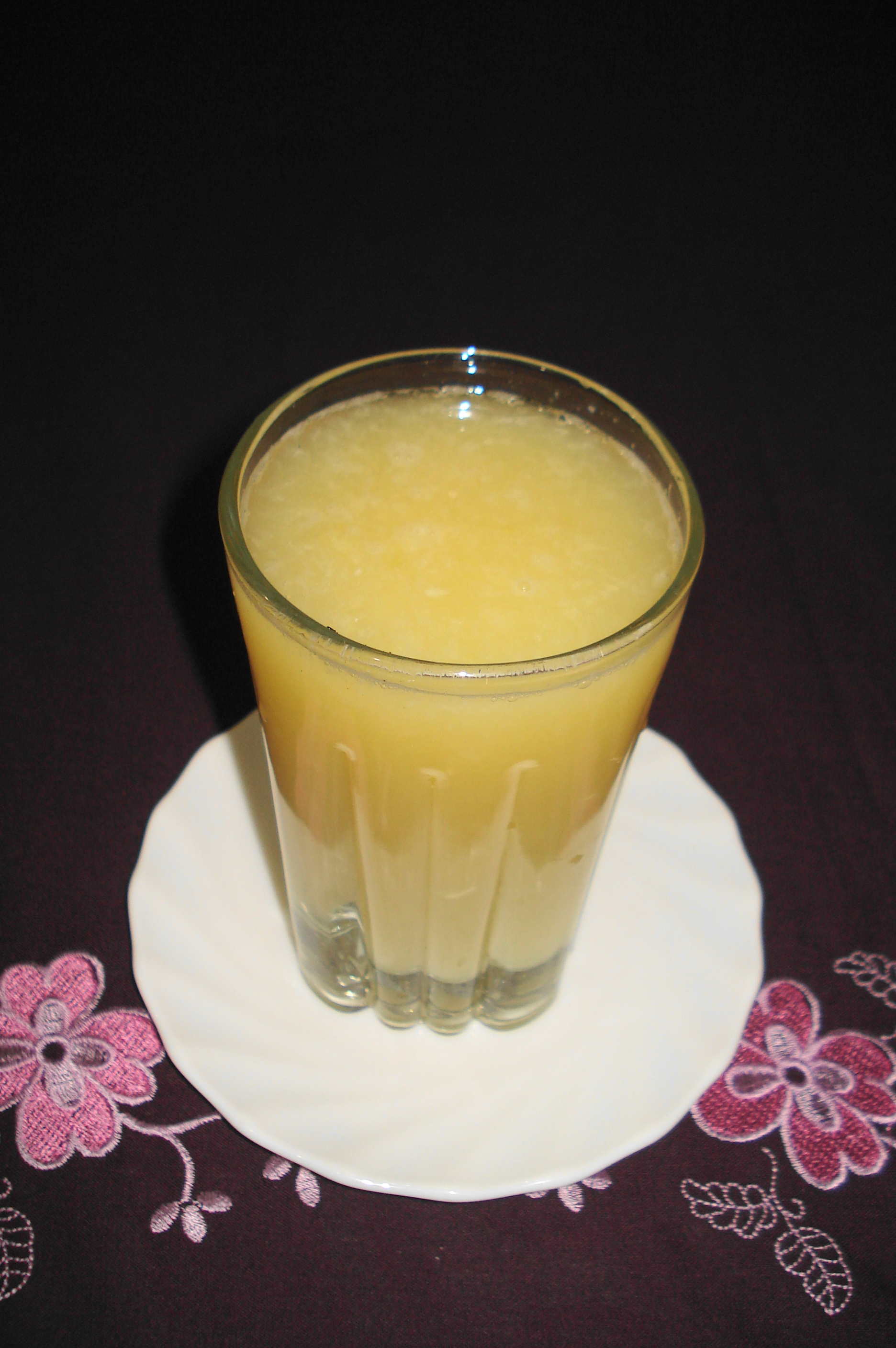
Mosambi Juice

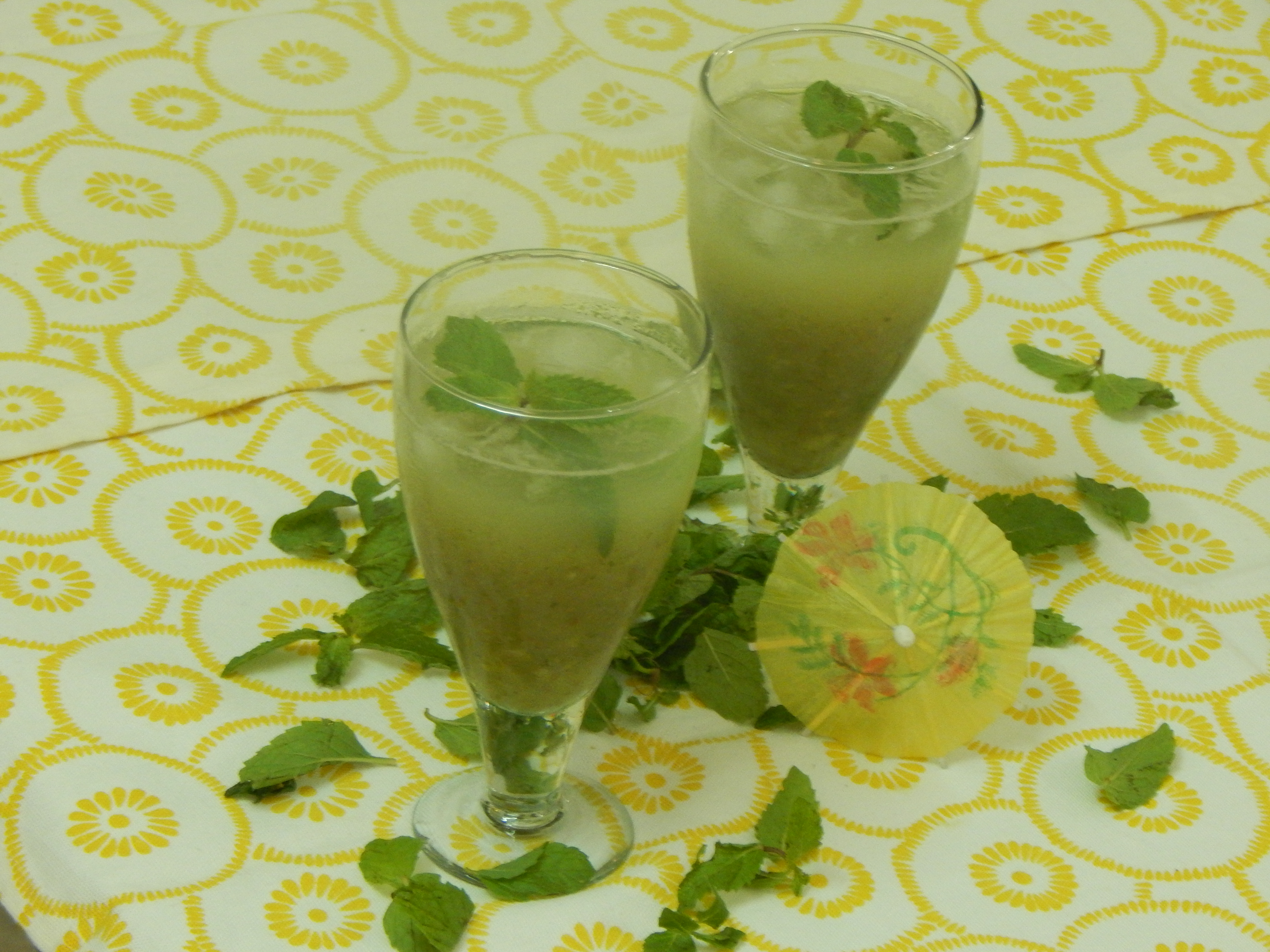
Aam panna

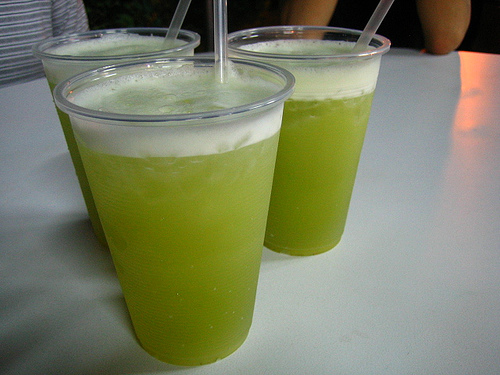
Ganna juice

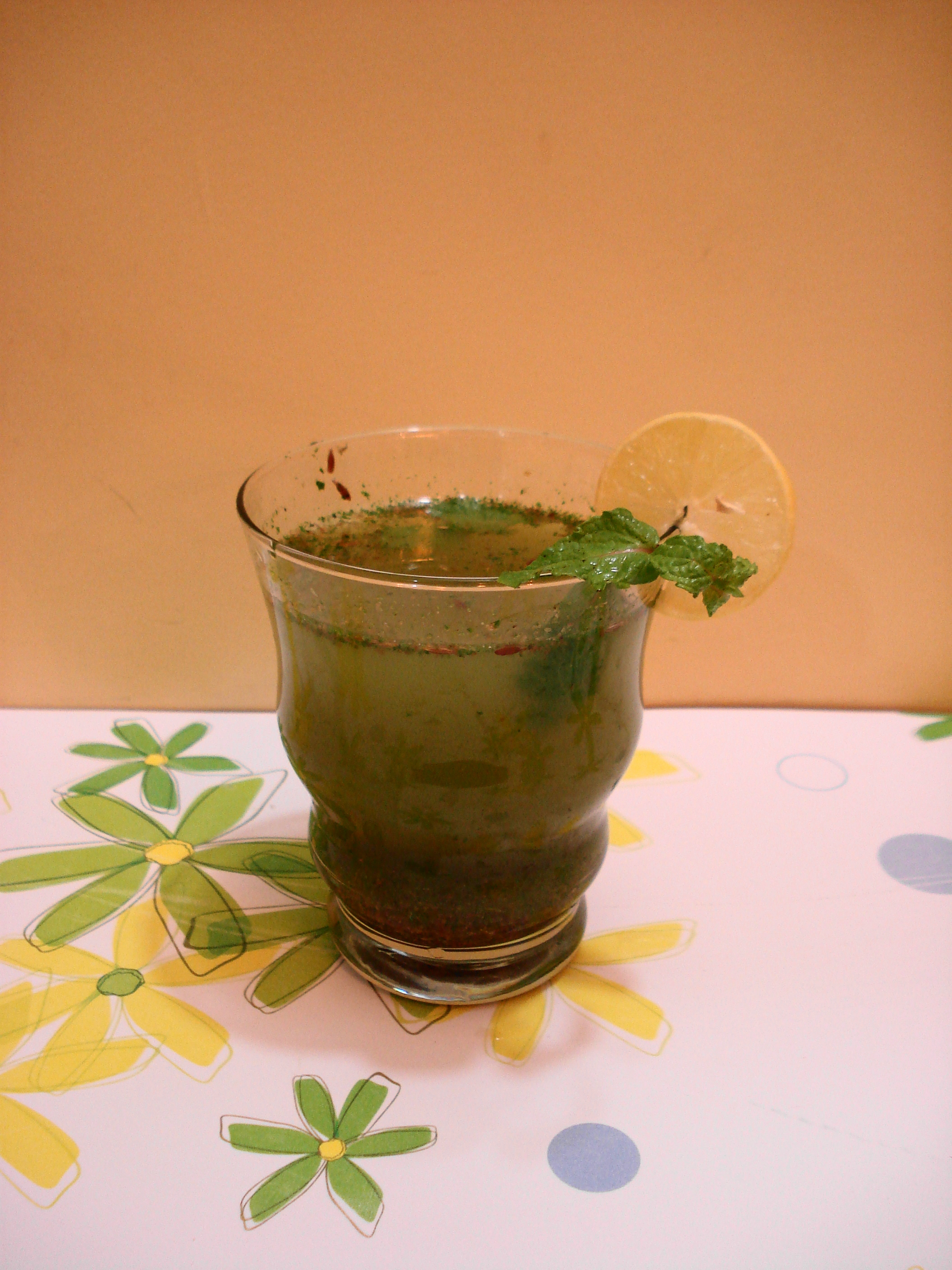
Jal-jeera

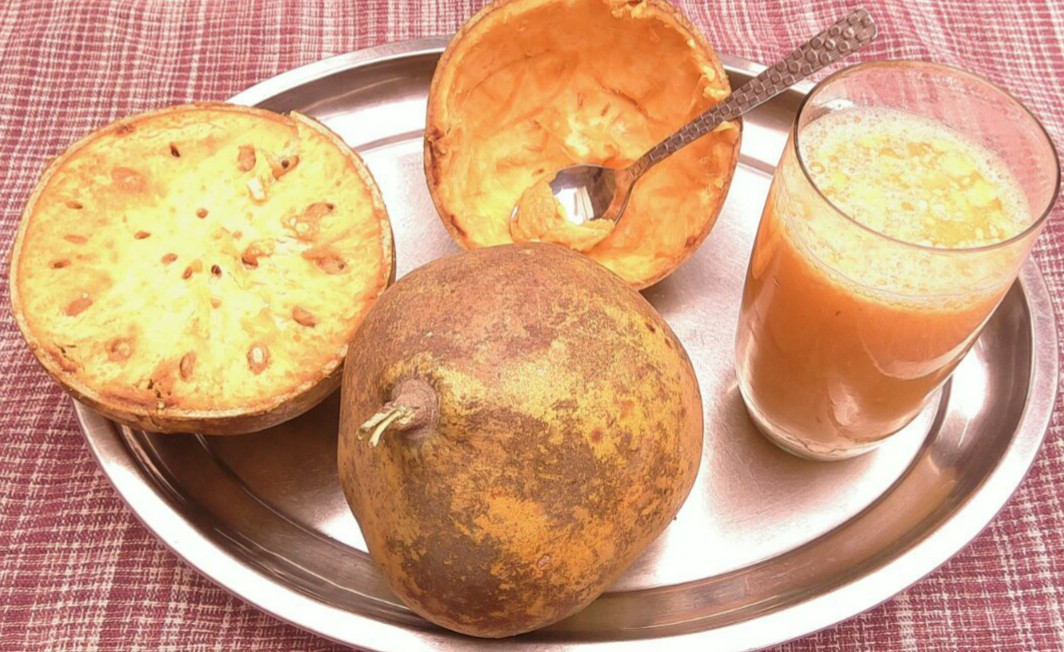
Bela Pana

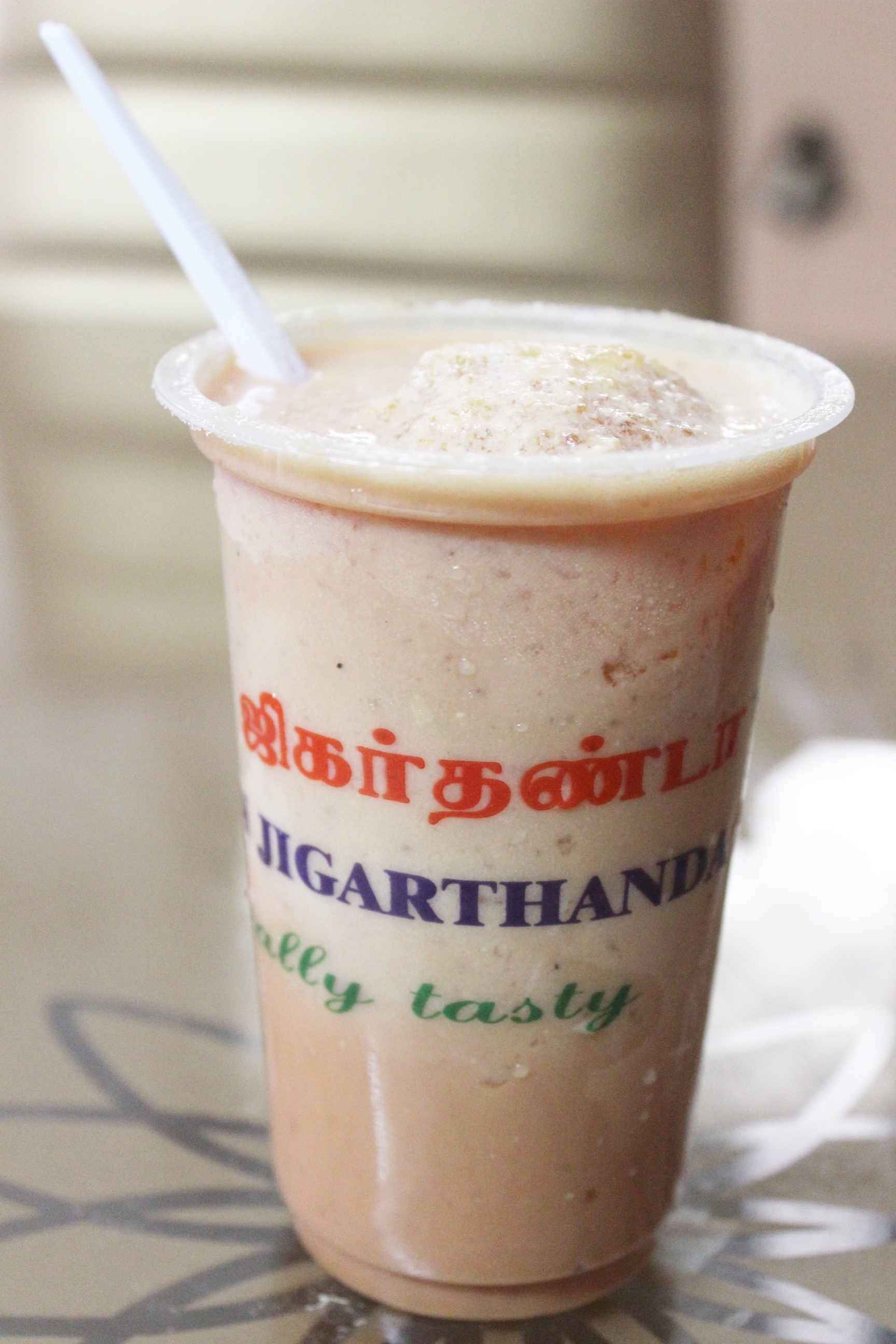
Jigarthanda

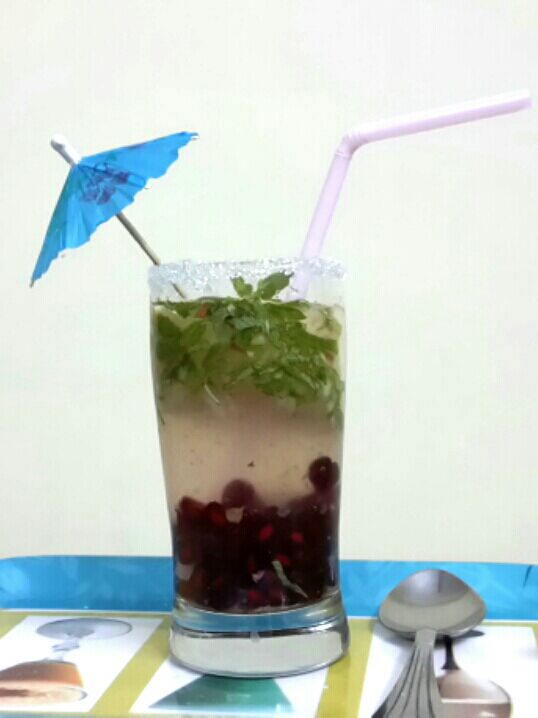
Shikanjvi

Indian drinks vary from hot drinks during winters to cold drinks in summers while different regions in the country serve drinks made with local spices, flavors and herbs. These drinks are all a part of the cuisine of India.

== Consumption statistics by drink type ==
This is the consumption of drinks per capita per year in India in 2021 by drink type, excluding water and juices.

Drink type	Per capita consumption (liters)
Hot drinks	70
Dairy drinks	34
Soft drinks	20
Bottled water	6
Alcoholic drinks	4
Total	134

== Assorted drinks ==
- Aam panna – made from raw mango
- Aamras
- Bela Pana – traditional Odia drink
- Banta soda, carbonated lemonade sold in codd-neck bottle
- Buransh – made from rhododendron flowers with jelly like consistency, Uttarakhand
- Doodh Soda
- Ela neeru / karikku – tender coconut water
- Fuljar soda – carbonated drink made using crushed chillies, ginger, mint leaves and spice mix
- Gaajar ka doodh – made from grated carrot and sweetened milk
- Ganne ka ras or sugarcane juice
- Gud-nimbu sharbat – made of lemon and jaggery
- Jal-jeera
- Jigarthanda, famous in Madurai
- Kahwah is common drink in cold regions of Jammu and Kashmir
- Kala Khatta
- Jeera Masala soda
- Kanji
- Karela Juice, used as an ayurvedic medicine for problems related to digestion
- Kesar kasturi
- Khas Khas drink – made from poppy seeds
- Khus sharbat – made from Vetiver syrup
- Kokum sharbat
- Kulukki sharbat – shaken Lemonade
- Liyo
- Mosambi Juice, made from special Indian sweet lime called mosambi
- Nimbu Paani (Lemonade)
- Nannaari (Sarsaparilla) sharbat – lemon-based drink, Tamil Nadu
- Nariyal Pani (Coconut water)
- Neera
- Ookali – hot drink made by boiling coriander seeds, Western India
- Paan Juice
- Paan Thandai
- Panakam – Beverage made of jaggery and lemon juice, traditionally served on Rama Navami.
- Paneer soda, carbonated lemonade mixed with rose essence and sold in codd-neck bottle is a variation of Banta soda
- Phalsa sharbat – made from Grewia asiatica
- Pudina sharbat – made from mint
- Ramula – a drink made from sweet potato
- Rasna, a soft drink concentrate
- Rooh Afza
- Sakar-loung Pani – made from rock sugar and clove; famous in Gujarat, Rajasthan
- Sattu paani – famous in East India
- Saunf paani, from Gujarat
- Sharbat – drink that has many variants
- Shikanjvi – traditional lemonade, often mildly spicy
- Solkadhi
- Sugandha water
- Tanka Toraaṇi – a rice based drink from Odisha

== Dairy drinks ==
=== Flavoured milk ===
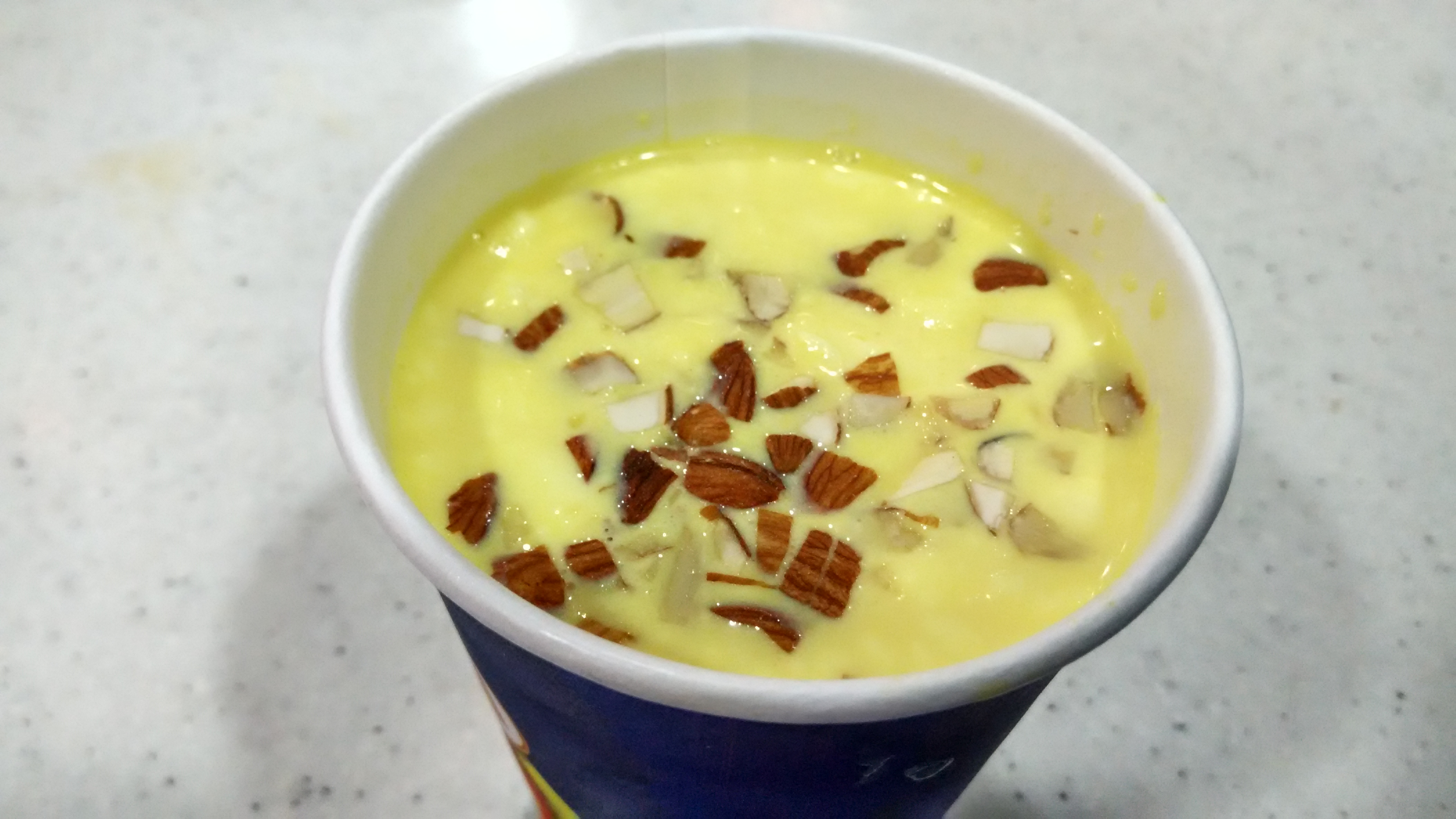
Badam milk

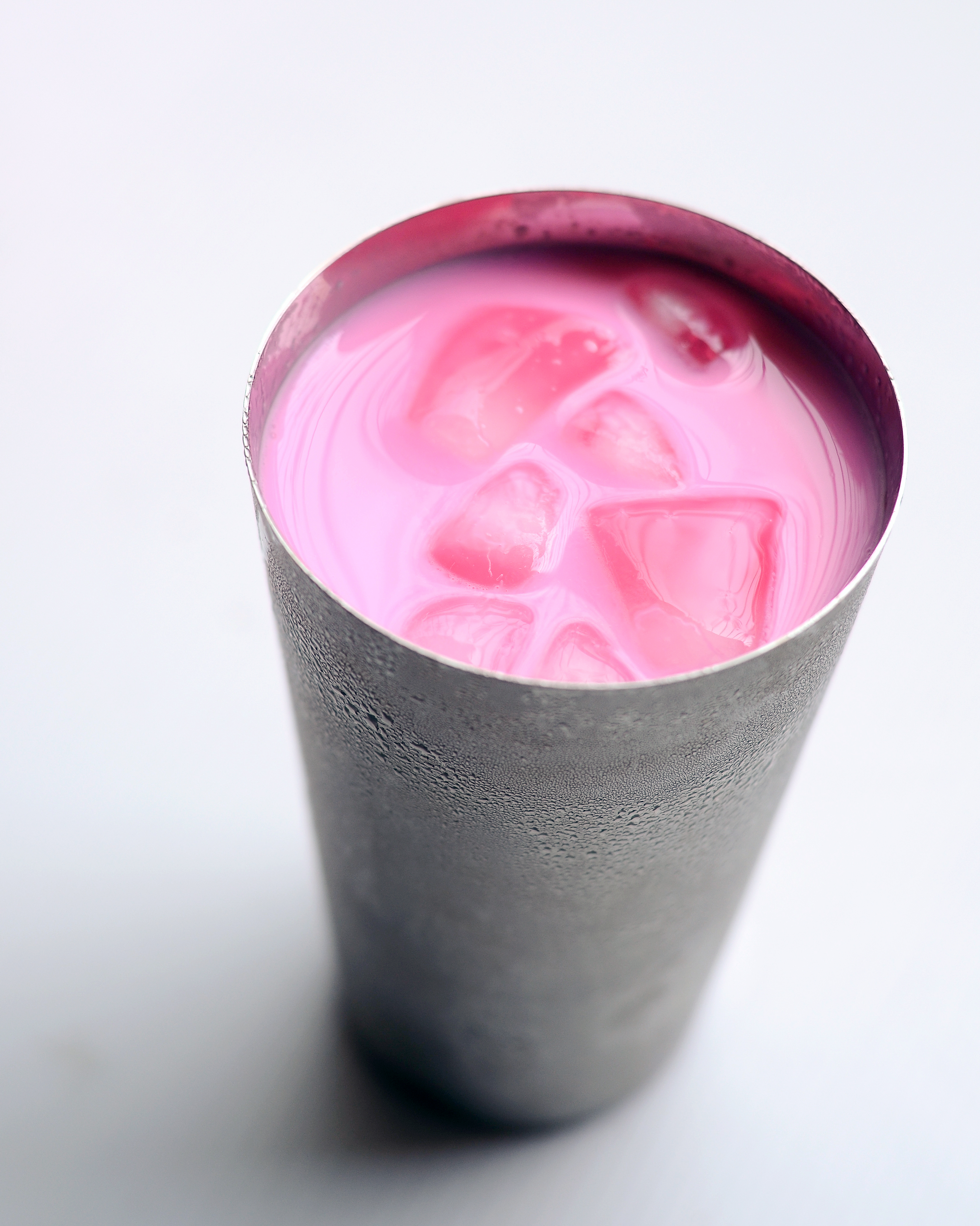
Rose milk

- Badam milk – almond-flavoured milk
- Kesar milk – saffron-flavoured milk
- Rose milk – Rose syrup – flavoured milk
- Sugandha milk

=== Milk-based beverages ===
- Ambil or Ambli – prepared by using ragi flour and buttermilk, Maharashtra and Karnataka
- Buttermilk – Lassi or Laasi in North India, chhachh or Chaas or Chaah in North India, mor in Tamil, majjiga in Telugu, majjige in Kannada, and taak in Marathi
- Chai with cream – prepared using dry or fresh variants of tea, often has hints of cardamom (elaichi), cinnamon (dalchini) or a mixture of spices, which constitute the special masala chai, taken especially during the cold to keep the winter-related problems at bay
- Doodh soda – mixture of milk and lemon-lime soda
- Haldi doodh or hot turmeric milk
- Lassi – a popular, traditional, yogurt-based drink from Northern India. It is a blend of yogurt, water, spices and sometimes fruit.
  - Traditional lassi (a.k.a., "salted lassi", or simply "lassi") is a savoury drink, sometimes flavoured with ground and roasted cumin.
  - Sweet lassi, however, contains sugar or fruits, instead of spices. Banarasi Lassi: Varanasi, one of the prominent cities of Bhojpur region is known for special variation of Lassi, popularly known as Banarasi Lassi'. The Curd for Banarasi Lassi is made with reduced milk which gives it a creamy and thick texture. It is then sweetened, churned and served with generous blob of Rabdi in earthen pots called Kulhads.
  - Patiala lassi, a famous Punjabi variation of the traditional yogurt-based drink, Lassi. Originating from the city of Patiala in Punjab, this version is known for its rich, creamy texture and generous use of butter, malai (clotted cream), and nuts like almonds and pistachios. It is typically served in large brass tumblers and is considered a specialty in Punjabi cuisine. Unlike regular lassi, Patiala Lassi is much thicker and often topped with an extra layer of cream.

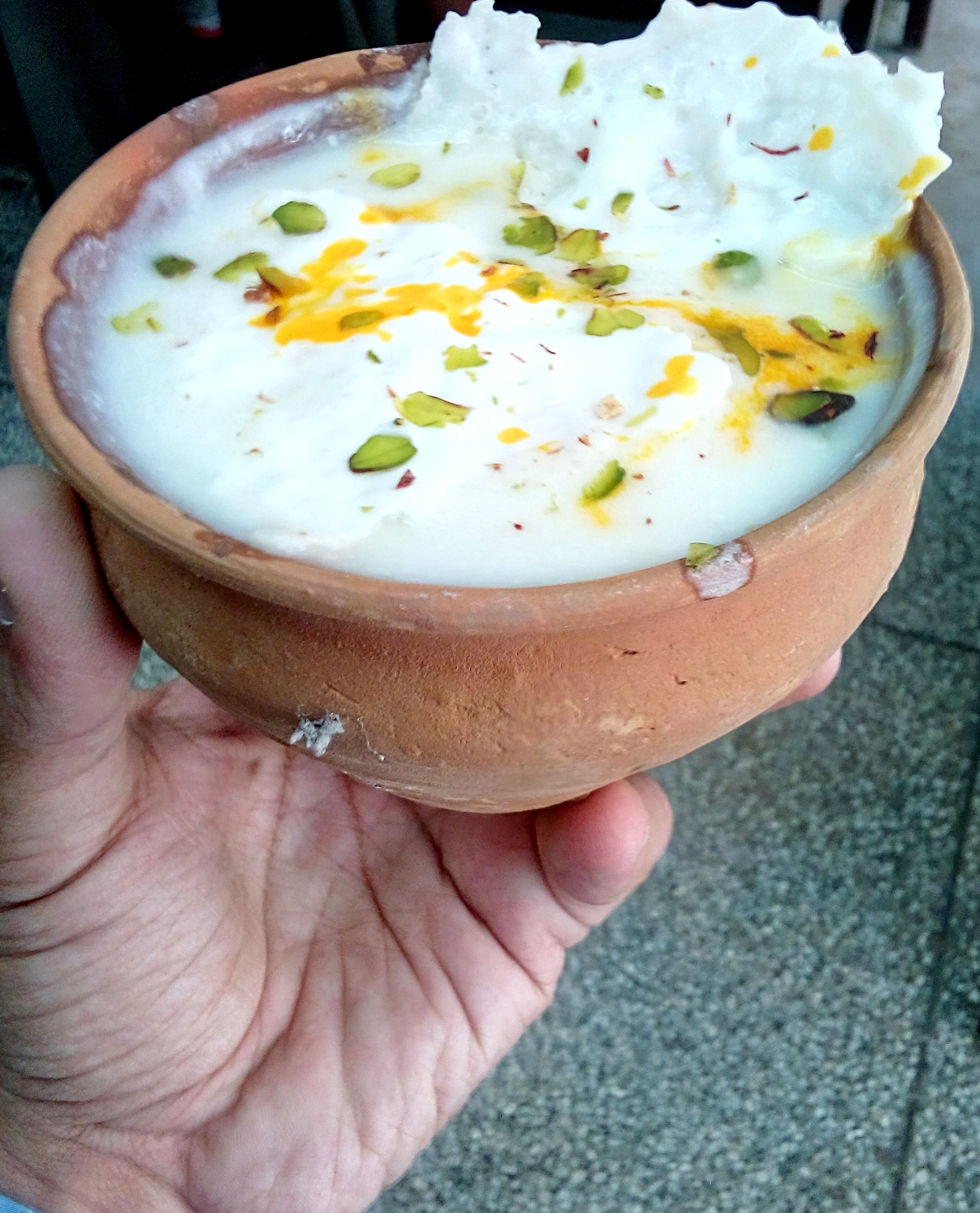
Traditional Banarasi Lassi in a Kulhad

- Mastaani, Pune
- Sharjah Shake – A sweet, cold beverage made from milk, Horlicks/other malt powders and njalipoovan. Sometimes, ice cream, cocoa powder or nuts may be added.
- Sambaram – Salted buttermilk made from cow's milk spiced with shallots, green chili peppers, ginger and curry leaves from Kerala
- Thandai
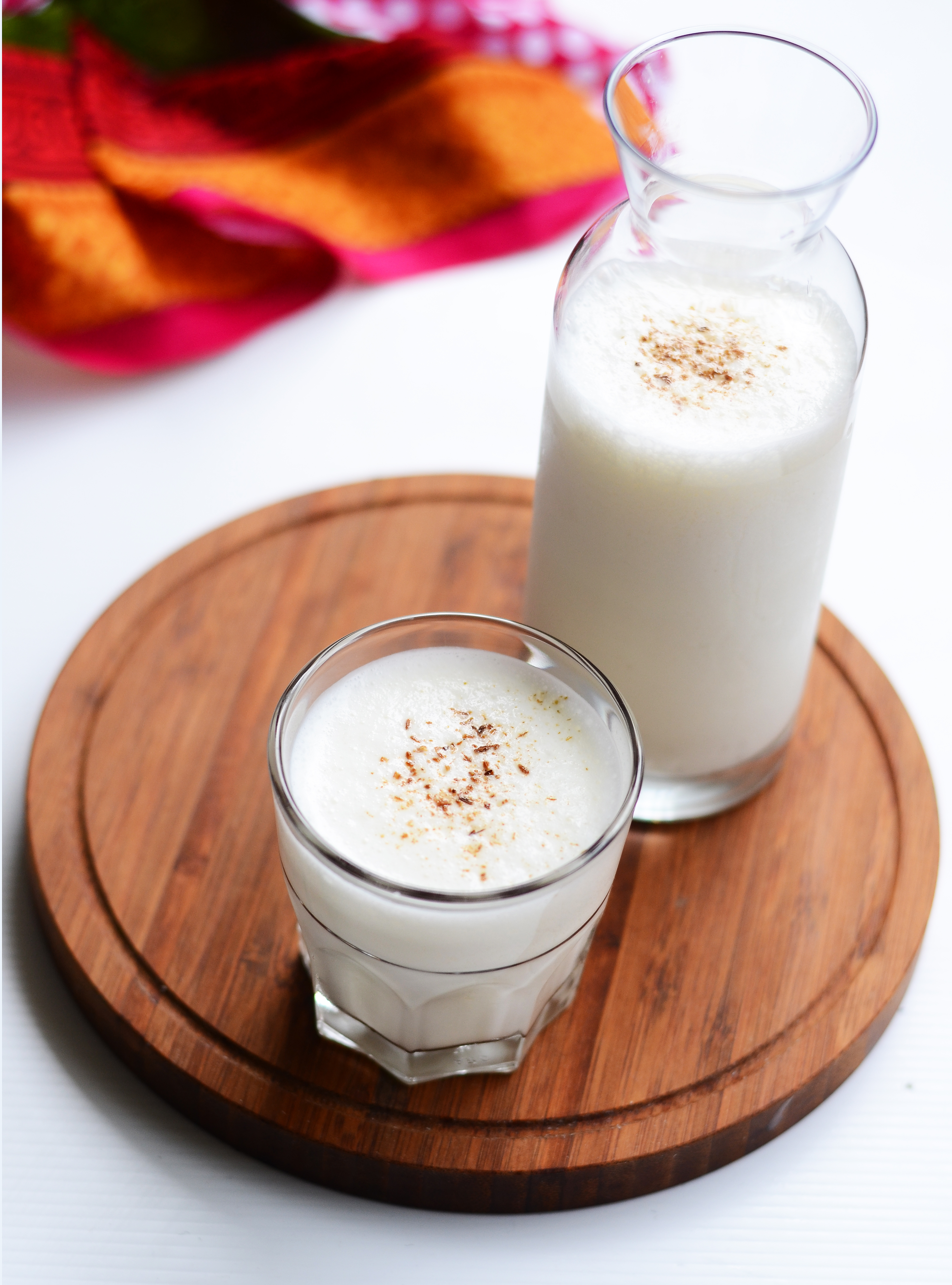
Lassi

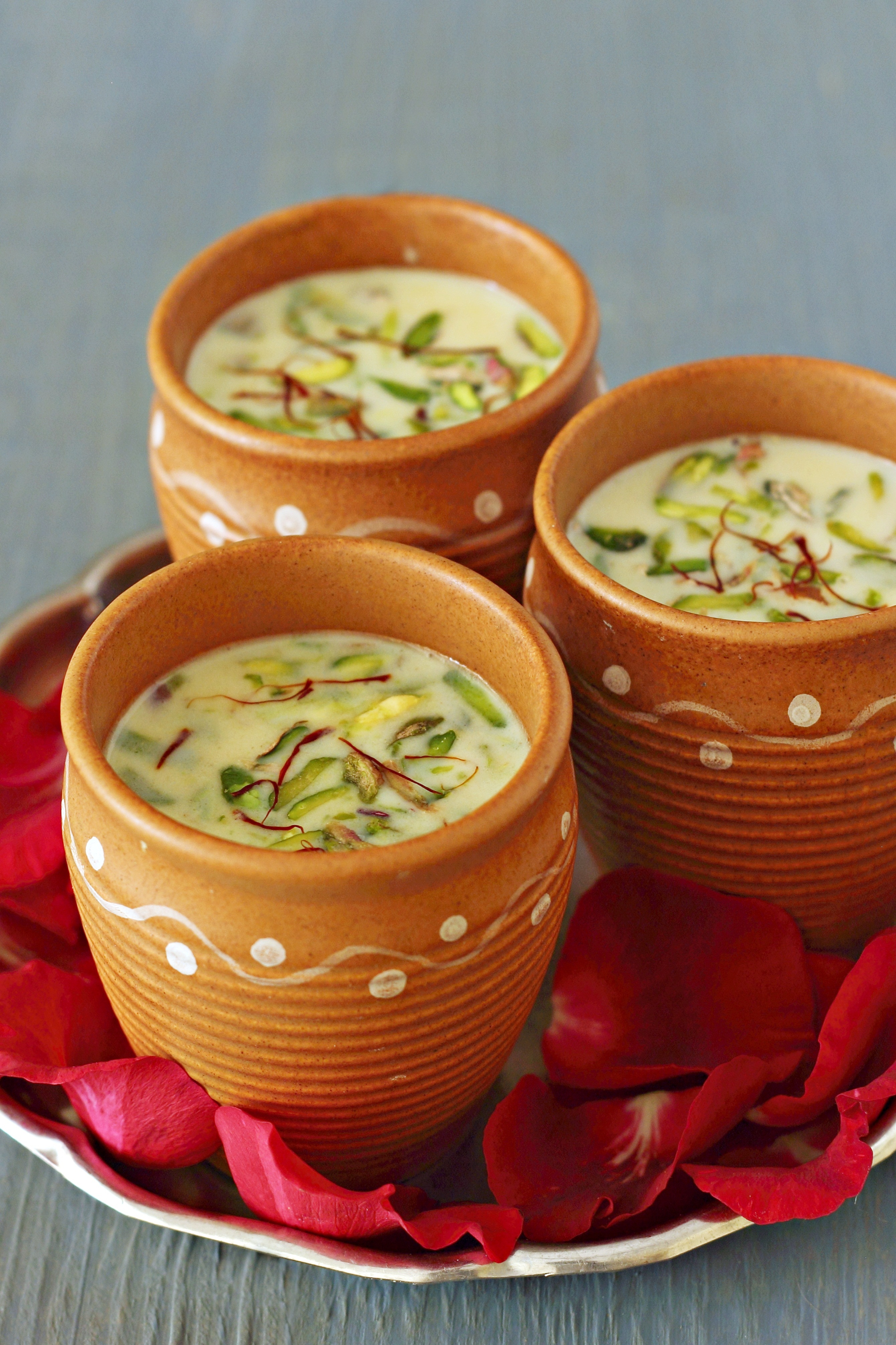
Thandai

== Hot drinks ==
Both tea and coffee contain caffeine and tannins. Comparatively, coffee has more caffeine and fewer tannins than tea, whereas tea has more tannins and less caffeine than coffee.

=== Coffee ===
- Indian filter coffee – a sweet milky coffee made from dark roasted coffee beans (70–80%) and chicory (20–30%)
- Instant coffee

=== Tea ===
- Assam tea
- Ayurvedic teas, various types of Indian herbal teas
- Temi tea
- Darjeeling tea
- Balma green tea
- Berinag tea
- Black tea
- Green tea
- Seven-colour tea
- Irani chai
- Kangra tea
- Masala chai
- Noon chai
- Nilgiri tea
- Tulsi tea
- Milk tea

==== Flavoured tea ====
- Butter tea
- Elaichi tea or cardamom tea
- Ginger tea
- Lemon tea
- Tejpatta Tea
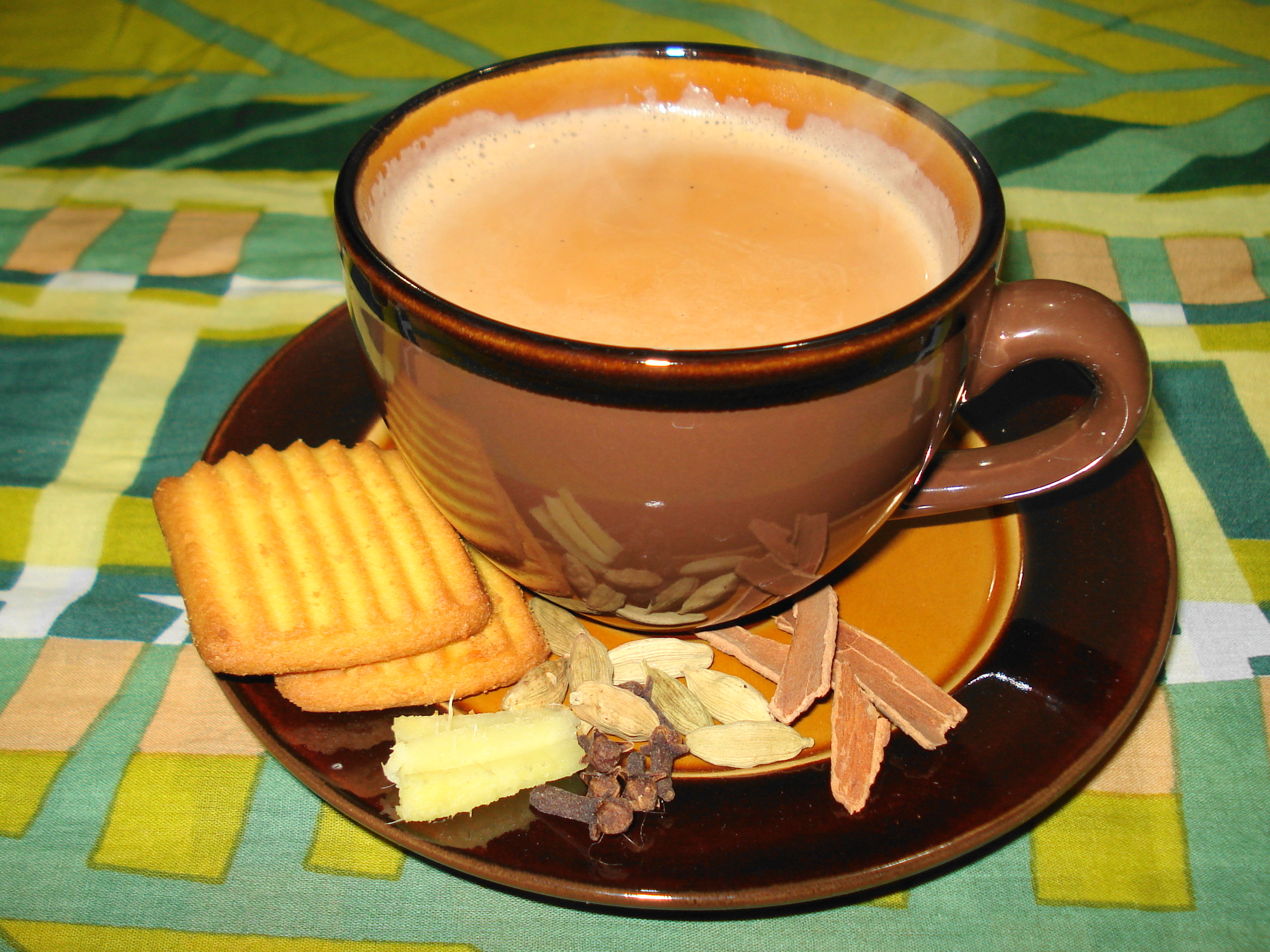
Masala chai served with tea biscuits. India's most popular way to drink tea.

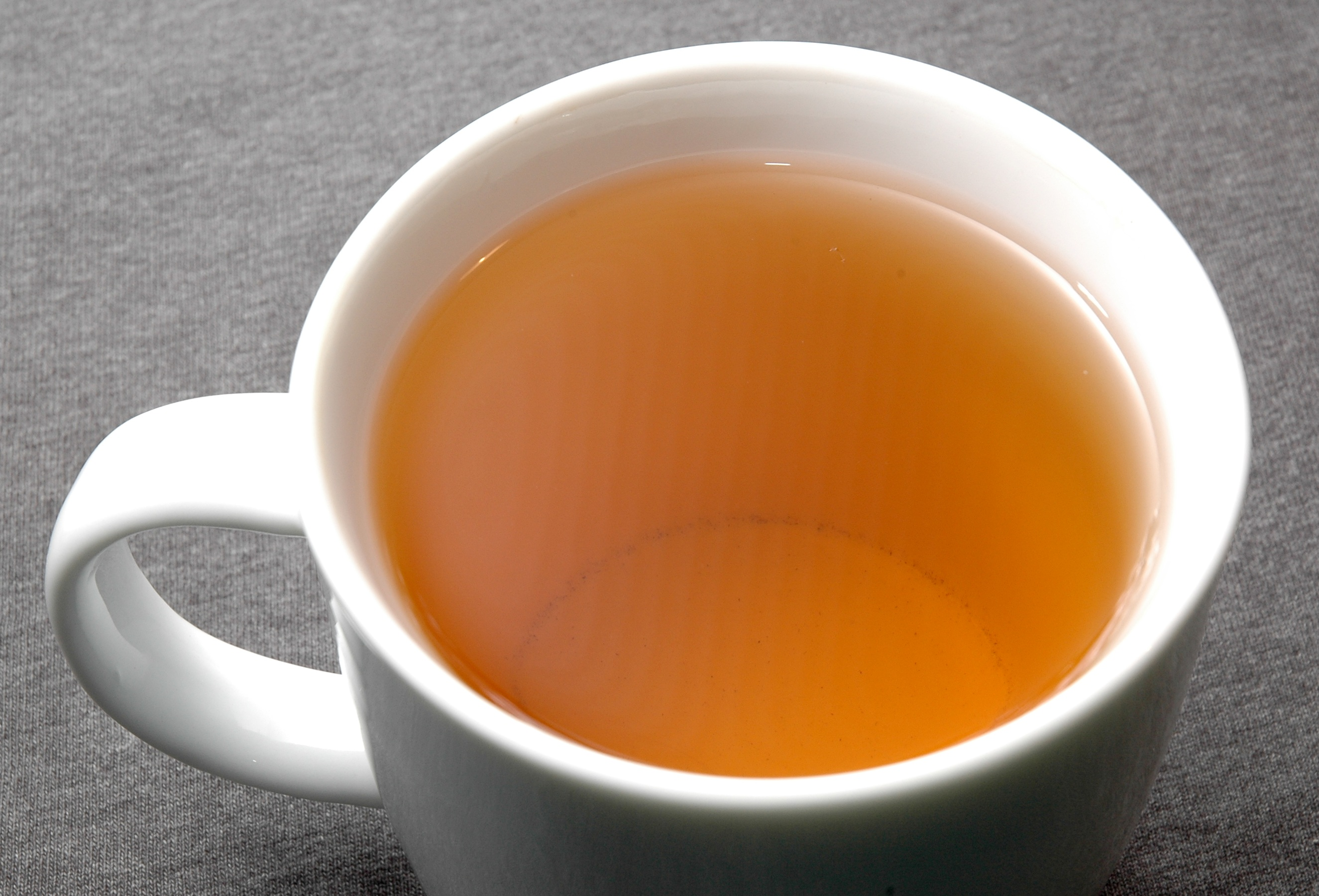
A cup of Darjeeling tea

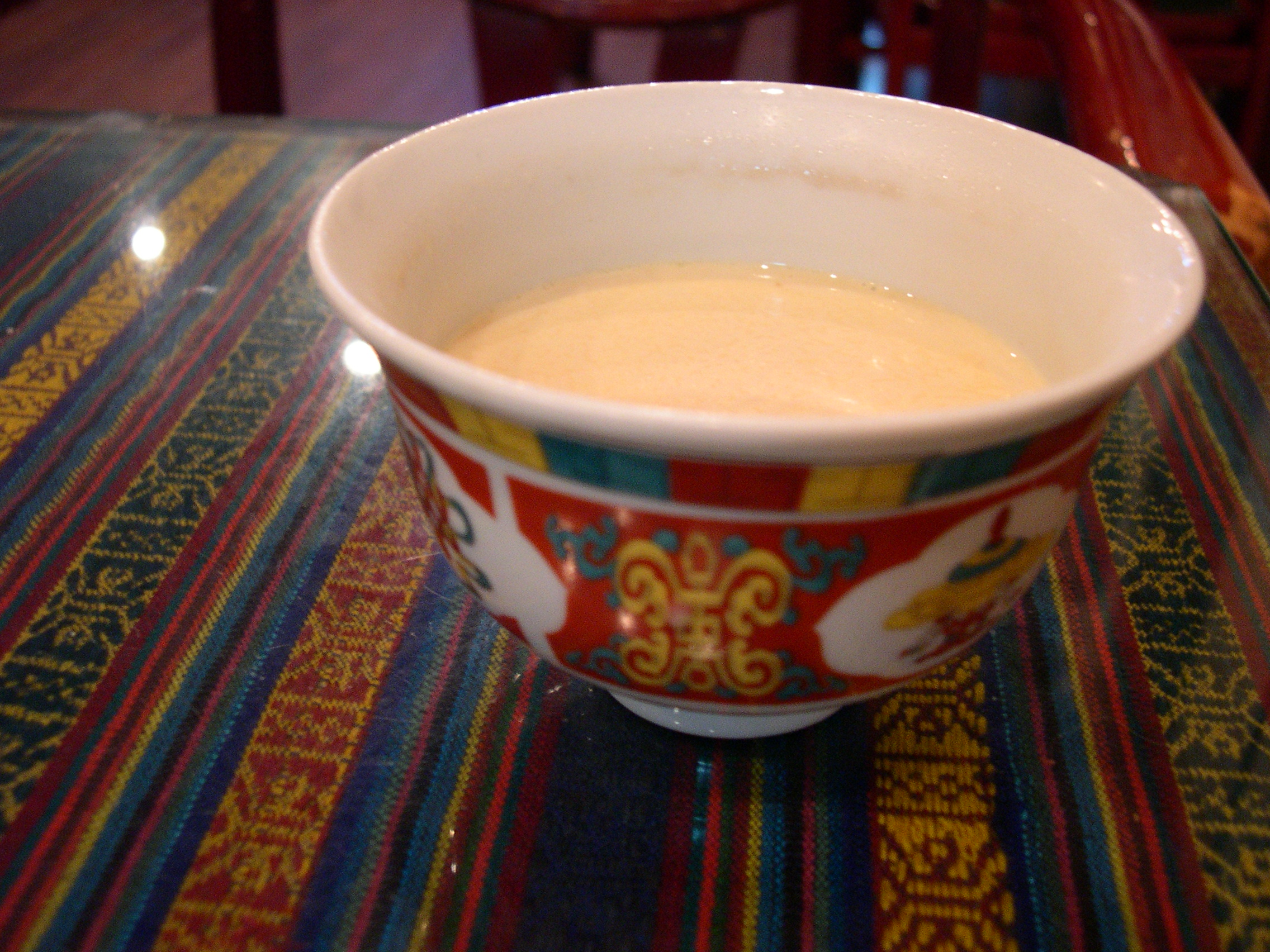
Butter tea or gur gur in the Ladakhi language, in a bowl; popular in Himalayan regions of India, particularly in Ladakh, Sikkim, and Arunachal Pradesh

== Intoxicating drinks ==
=== Ancient ===
See the list of vedic and ayurvedic alcoholic drinks.

=== Traditional ===
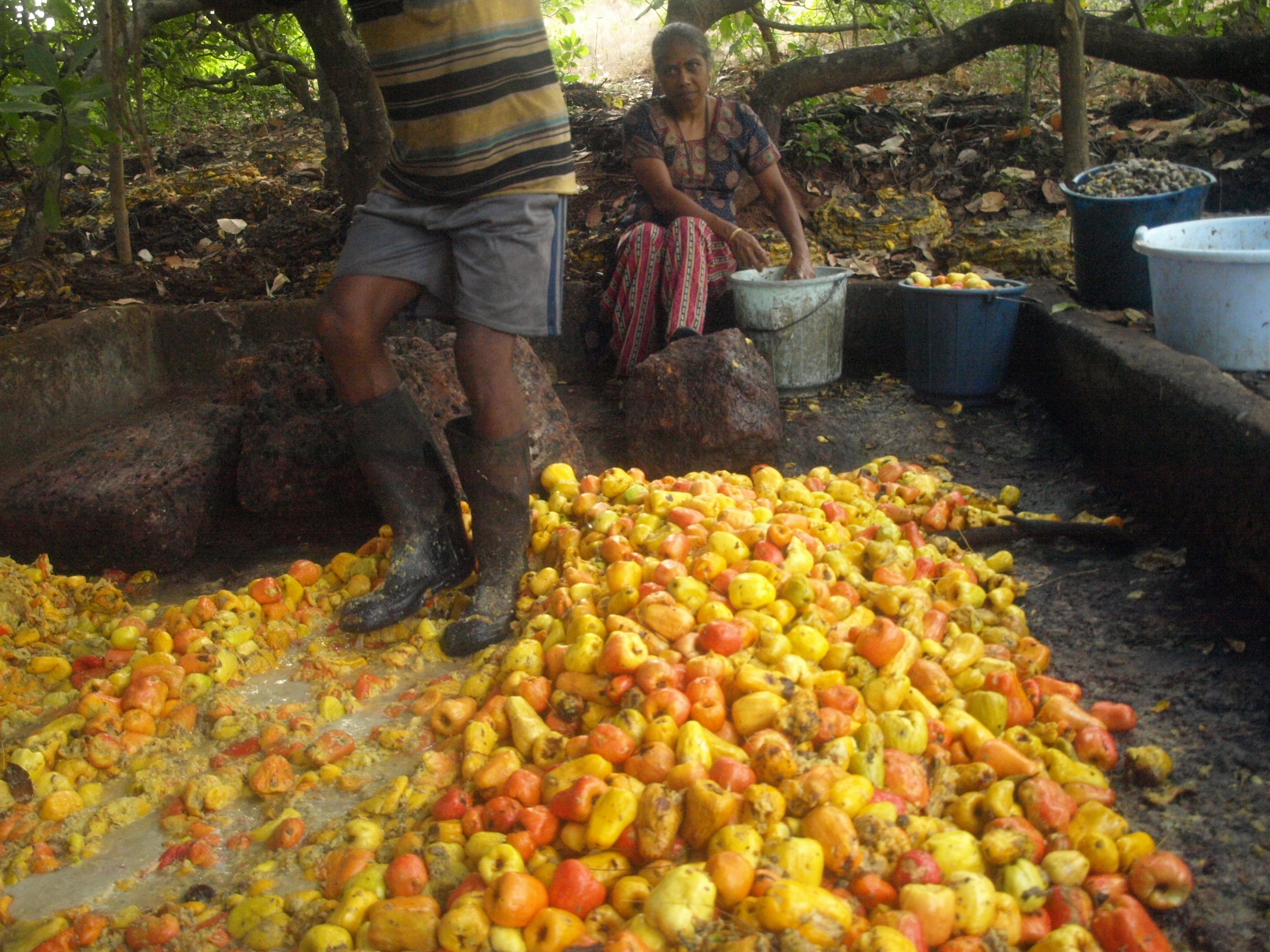
Cashew apples being squashed in Chorao, Goa, to be used in the preparation of feni

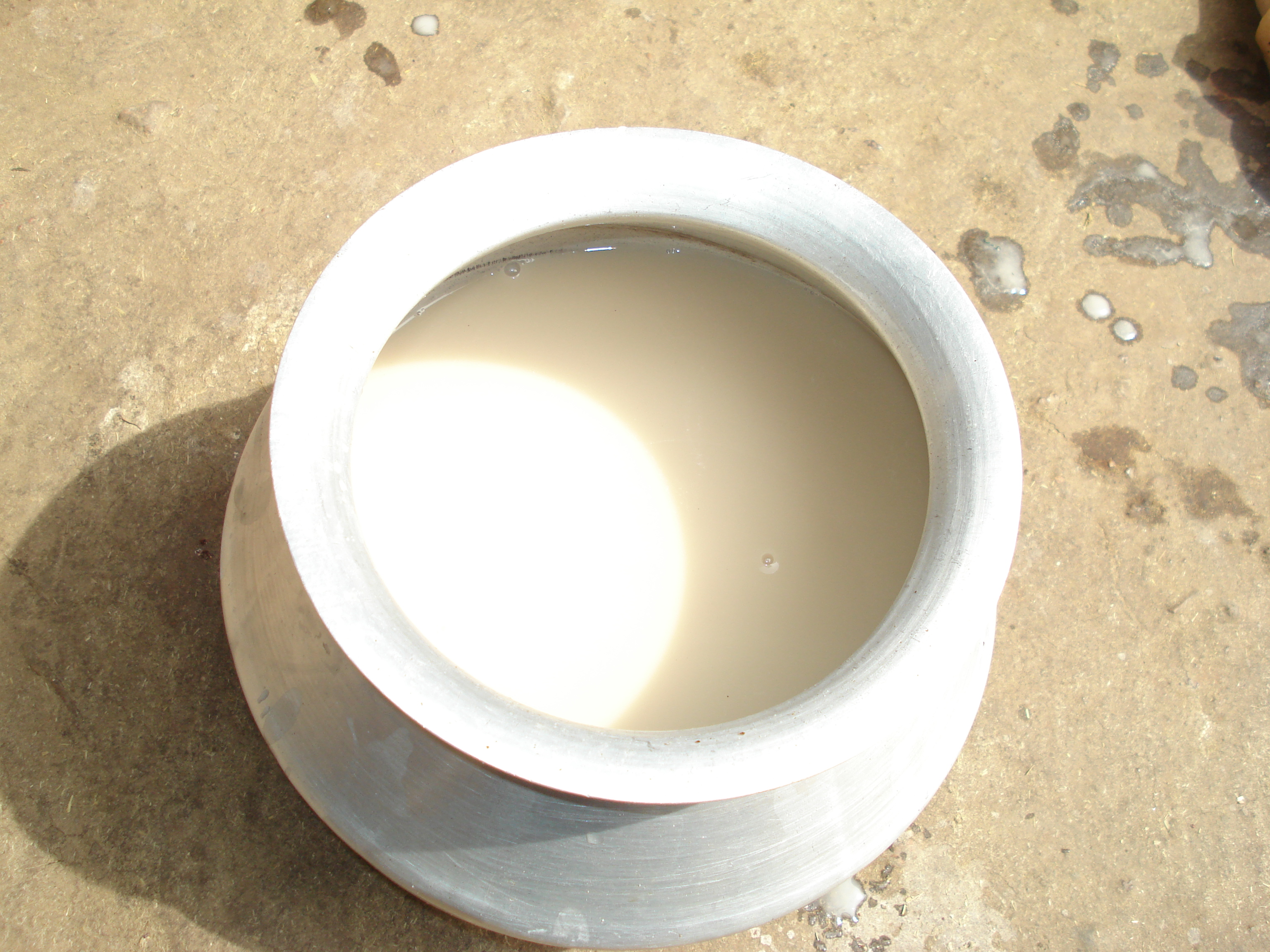
Handia is a rice beer commonly made by the indigenous people in Jharkhand, Bihar, Odisha, Madhya Pradesh and Chhattisgarh.

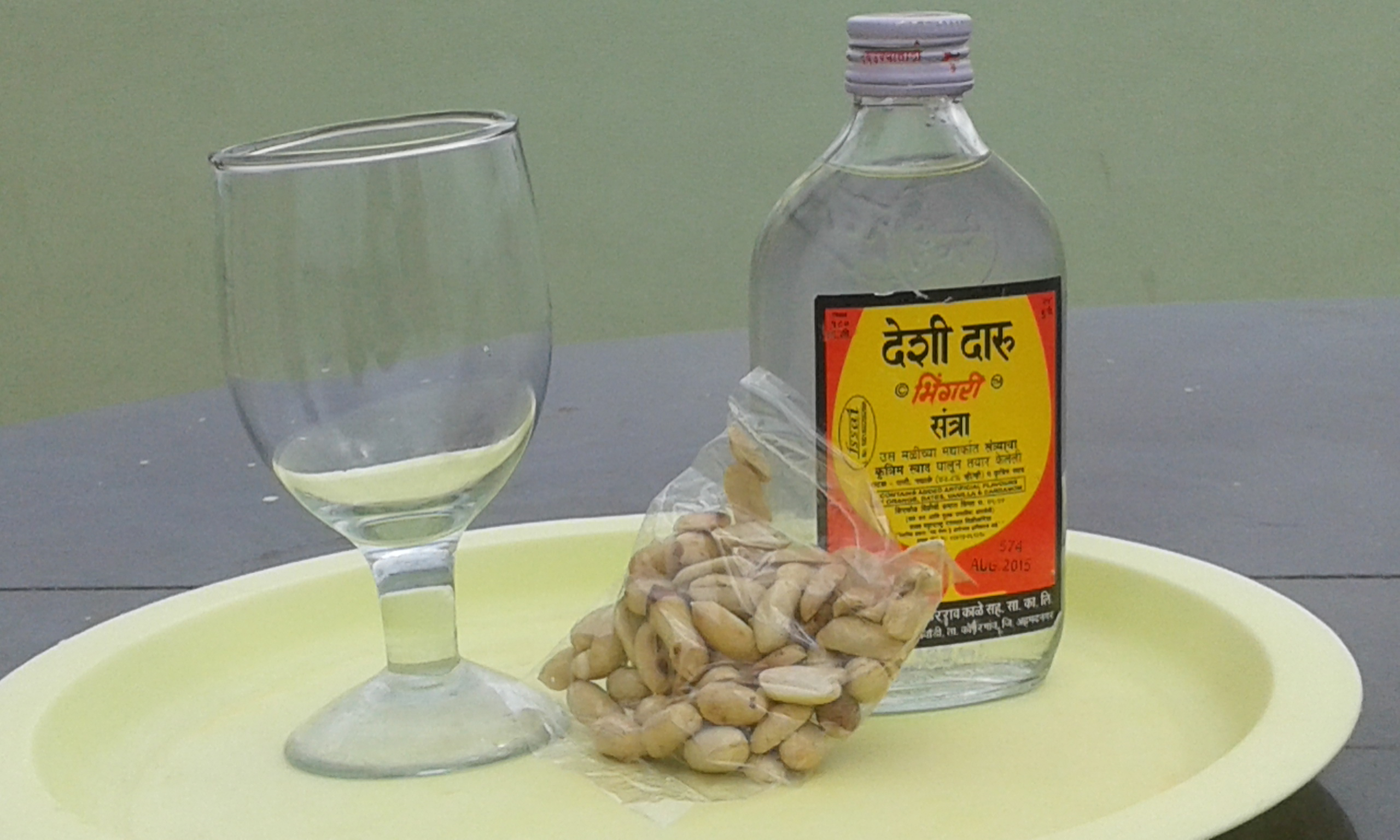
Desi daru is one of the cheapest factory made alcoholic drinks available in India.

A bottle of Bangla liquor in Chinsurah, West Bengal, India

The alphabetised list of native traditional drinks is as follows:

- Akani – palm sap from Tamil Nadu.
- Apo – traditional drink from Arunachal Pradesh made from fermented rice
- Arrack-distilled from a wash of palm Jagger, herbs etc. from Kerala
- Bangla – a distilled country liquor made from starch and sold in West Bengal by government licensed vendors.
- Bhang thandai
- Bhang lassi – prepared from leaves and buds of female cannabis plant
- Bitchi – a drink consumed mostly by Garo tribals
- Chhaang or Tongba – drink from Sikkim made from grain millet
- Cholai
- Chuak – a drink from Tripura made from rice, jackfruit and pineapple
- Desi daru
- Feni – an alcoholic beverage made from cashew apple or coconut in Goa
- Gudamaba – brewed from sugar cane in Hyderabad
- Handia – rice beer popularly consumed in Jharkhand
- Hariya
- Kaid Um – drink in Meghalaya, consumed mostly by Khasi and Jaintia tribes
- Kallu – coconut palm sap from Kerala
- Kodo Ko Jaanr – also known as chyang, prepared from finger millet
- Laopani (also called Haanj) – made from fermented rice in Assam, concentrated extract is called Rohi.
- Lugdi – made from rice, Himachal Pradesh
- Mahua – made from mahua flowers, Central India
- Mandia pej – made from ragi powder and stale water from boiled rice, popular in Odissa
- Manri – made from fermented rice, popular in Mithila
- Pendhā
- Rohi – pale yellow coloured extract of Laopani fermented rice drink of Assam, usually offered to the ancestors, priests or elders on special occasions.
- Sekmai – from the state of Manipur; made from sticky rice.
- Sonti
- Sulai
- Sunda Kanji – made from fermenting rice that is buried in earthen or mud pots covered with cloth, sold in Tamil Nadu, India.
- Sura
- Thaati Kallu
- Tharra
- Thuthse
- Toddy/Tadi/Kallu (palm wine)
- Urrak
- Zawlaidi – popular in Mizoram prepared from rice, millet and maize.
- Zutho – from Nagaland
- Zu – from Mizoram

=== Non-Traditional ===
Alphabetised list of non-traditional drinks in India.

- Indian beer
- Indian brandy
- Indian-made foreign liquor
- Indian rum
- Indian vodka
- Indian whisky
- Indian wine
- Lion beer, Asia's first beer brand produced at Kasauli Brewery since 1930, brewery was established by Edward Abraham Dyer, the father of Colonel Reginald Edward Harry Dyer who became known as the "Butcher of Amritsar".
- Old Monk, well-known rum produced since 1954.
- Solan No. 1, India's first single malt whiskey produced at Kasauli Brewery since 1930 which was also started by Edward Abraham Dyer.

== See also ==
- List of Indian dishes
- Lists of drinks
