= Paper Boat =

Indian drink brand

- Product type: Beverages
- Current owner: Hector Beverages
- Produced by: Hector Beverages
- Country: India
- Introduced: August 2013; 13 years ago
- Markets: India
- Tagline: Drinks and Memories
- Website: www.paperboatfoods.com; www.paperboatdrinks.com

Paper Boat is a brand of traditional Indian beverages and foods produced and marketed by Hector Beverages, which is headquartered in Bengaluru, India.

Paper Boat was launched by Hector Beverages in August 2013. It comprises traditional Indian drinks such as Aam Panna, Jaljeera and Aam Ras. The drinks were initially offered in single serving, flexible pouches; the company has since then expanded to one liter Tetra Pak cartons.

The company is funded by N. R. Narayana Murthy-led Catamaran Ventures, Footprint Ventures and Peak XV Partners (formerly Sequoia Capital India & Southeast Asia), among other investors.

== History ==
Hector Beverages was founded in 2009 by Neeraj Kakkar, Neeraj Biyani, Suhas Misra and James Nuttall.

The company's first product was a protein drink called Frissia, following which the energy drink brand, Tzinga was launched in 2011.

In March 2013, the company launched Paper Boat, a fruit pulp based beverage brand and shifted its focus to the ethnic drinks segment.

The brand launched with Aam Panna and Jal Jeera drinks and later added ethnic drinks including Aam Ras, Chilled Rasam, Kokum, Jamun Kala Khatta, Chilli Gauva and Neer More.

The company went through a few organizational changes when co-founders Misra and Nuttall left the company in 2014, and 2015, respectively, leaving Kakkar and Biyani at the helm.

In 2016, Paper Boat launched 500 ml Tetra Prisma Aseptic (TPA) packs of Aam Ras and Anar. The 500 ml packs were discontinued in 2017, when the brand expanded its offering by launching its drinks in 1 liter Tetra Prisma Aseptic cartons.

Paper Boat expanded to the traditional food segment in 2016 by launching the Indian snack, peanut chikki.

In subsequent years, Hector Beverages expanded its snack portfolio and distribution network. By August 2022, the company had entered the dry-fruits-basked snacks and zero sugar snacks segments, and its products were available across approximately 500,000 outlets.In August 2022 Singapore’s sovereign wealth fund (GIC) was looking to invest $70 million in Hector Beverages, valuing the company at approximately $250-280 million.

== Products ==
=== Drinks ===
Paper Boat offers fruit based ethnic drinks and milk based beverages.

Paper Boat produces two seasonal drinks associated with Indian festivals, Panakam (available during Rama Navami) and Sherbet-e-Khas (available during Eid). The brand launched Coconut Water in 2018.

In its one-liter Tetra Pack cartons, the brand delivers Aam Ras, Jamun, Anar, Apple, Guava, Mixed Fruit, Pineapple, Cranberry, Tomato and Lychee Ras. Aam Ras previously contained 45% mango pulp, but reduced it to 25% (shrinkflation) and is made from naturally ripened mangoes.

The drinks offered are as follows:

- Aam Panna
- Aamras
- Anar
- Chilli Guava
- Ginger Lemon Tea
- Jaljeera
- Jamun
- Kokum
- Neer More
- Panakam
- Rose Tamarind
- Şerbet-e-Khaas
- Thandai
- Lush Lychee

=== Foods ===
Peanut chikki was Paper Boat's first venture into ethnic Indian snacks. Paper Boat chikki is a Fair-Trade product, a certification that ensures that everyone involved in the making of a product is fairly employed and paid. The company procures its groundnuts directly from a farmers’ collective near Rajkot in Gujarat at the Fairtrade minimum price.

Paper Boat chikki has three other variants: crushed peanut, sesame and Rajgira peanut.

The foods offered are as follows:

- Nuts, seeds, and berries:
  - Almonds
  - Cashews
  - Mixed nuts
  - Pistachios
  - Raw nuts
  - Supermixes
  - Trail mixes
- Snacks:
  - Chikki
  - Golgappa
  - Aam papad

== Production ==
Hector Beverages presently has two manufacturing facilities, one in Mysuru and one in Manesar, Gurgaon, and with a capacity of ten million pouches per month.

The company's first production plant was established in Manesar in 2010. A second, larger manufacturing unit was opened in Mysuru, Karnataka in 2014. While the Manesar plant has a production capacity of 80 bottles per minute, in the Mysuru plant, it is 380 bottles per minute.

== Marketing ==
The brand name Paper Boat and the tag line ‘Drinks and Memories’ are intended to be references to the consumer's childhood.

Paper Boat's television ads were set to an adaptation of the music of RK Narayan's Malgudi Days. Paper Boat’s debut campaign was penned and narrated by poet and lyricist Gulzar, while the later campaign was written by lyricist Swanand Kirkire.

Apart from its television ads, the brand has also released a range short films such as ‘Ride Down the River of Memories’, ‘Waiting for Ma’, ‘My Struggles with the Treasure Chest’, ‘Hum honge kamyab’, and 'Rizwan - Keeper of the Gates of Heaven'.

Paper Boat also ventured into book publishing. It has published reprints of Three Men in a Boat and Jungle Book, which were given away with the beverages as part of gift boxes and sales offers. In 2017, the brand published Half Pants Full Pants by Anand Suspi, a collection of real-life tales about growing up in Shimoga.
