= Jigarthanda (drink) =

Beverage in Tamil Nadu, South India

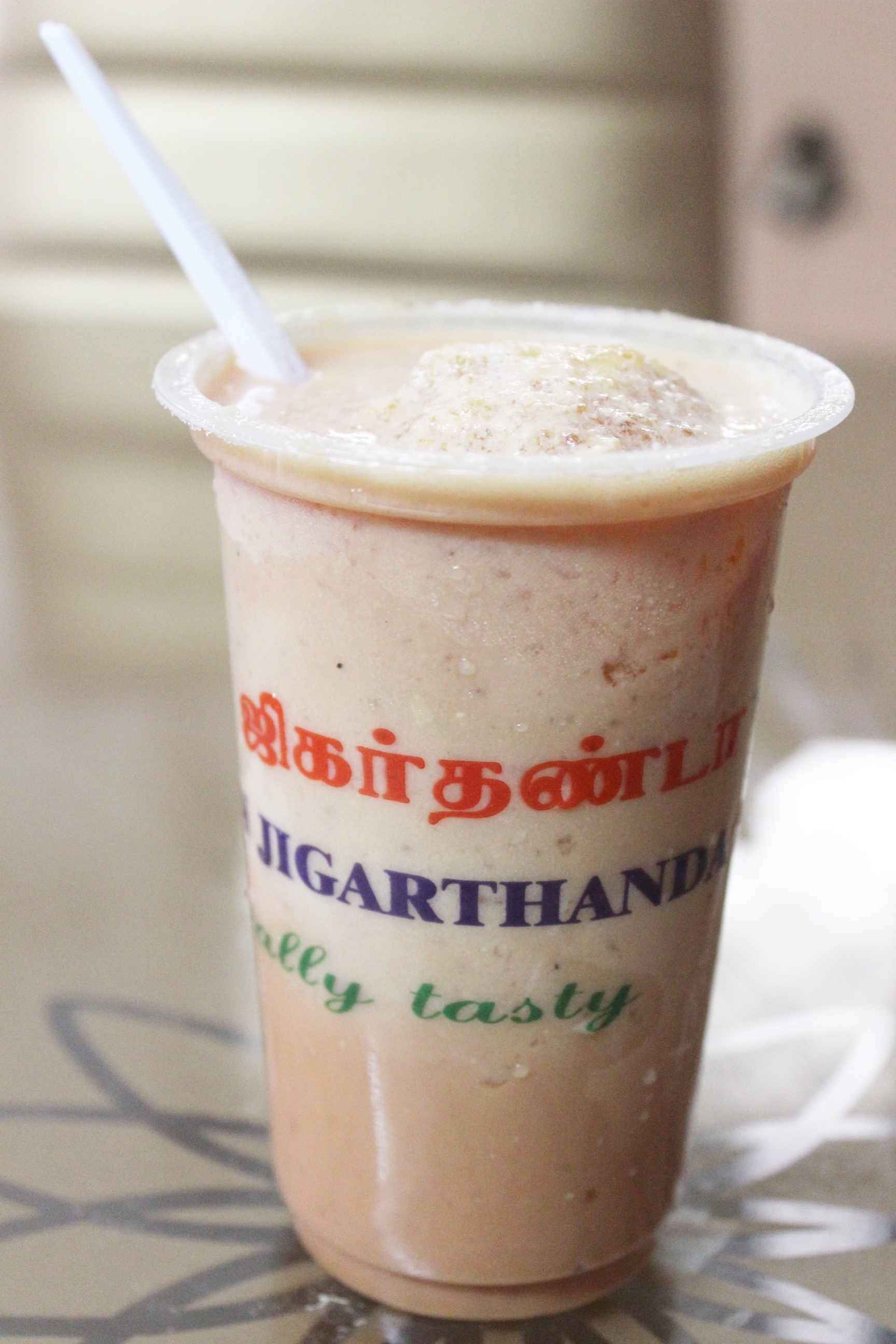
- Jigarthanda
- Type: Beverage
- Place of origin: India
- Region or state: Tamil Nadu
- Serving temperature: Cold
- Main ingredients: Milk, sugar, almond

Jigarthanda is a cold beverage from the South Indian city of Madurai. It translates to "cool heart" ("jigar" is a metaphor for heart in Persian, literally meaning "liver"; "thanda" means "cold") in English, implying that the drink’s cooling effect will be felt right down to one’s heart. It is generally prepared and served at roadside stalls as a refreshment during the Indian summer. The basic ingredients include milk, almond gum, sarsaparilla root syrup, sugar and ice cream.

It is widely regarded as a signature drink of Madurai and his commonly sold at roadside stores throughout the city especially during the months of Summer.

== Etymology ==
Jigarthanda literally means "cold heart" and can be interpreted as "cool liver" in Hindi. Another take on the word defines jigar as bravery and thanda as captain or rower of a boat, referring to the customary use of sea algae gelatin in the drink.

== Key ingredients ==
The core preparation uses a blend of milk (full fat and condensed), khoya, sarsaparilla root syrup, and edible almond gum, providing the drink with a unique chewy texture. Badam pisin and Katira gond are alternate names used to refer to the primary gelling agent in the drink, the almond gum. Though the name is identified as Urdu and its nomenclature points to a North Indian origin, the drink is distinct from falooda by its absence of vermicelli and rooh afza.

== Cultural significance ==
Jigarthanda is a popular drink from Madurai, celebrated as the city's own, often marking the completion of the Aadi discount sale ritual. Some Muslim families in the area believe this drink to be aphrodisiac.

== Popular culture ==
The 2014 Tamil-language film Jigarthanda by Karthik Subbaraj is named after this popular drink. The film takes place in Madurai, the origin of the drink.

== See also ==
- List of Indian drinks
