= Rubber ring =

Rubber ring may refer to:

- Swim ring, a type of flotation device
- Rubber washer, a vibration dampening device
- "Rubber Ring", a 1985 song by The Smiths
