= Indian Brandy =

Traditional herbal remedy

Indian Brandy is a traditional herbal remedy for the relief of flatulence, colic and heartburn. It was dispensed by corner shops in the North and Midlands of industrial England until the early 1970s. It is mildly alcoholic.

== See also ==
- List of alcoholic Indian beverages
