= Shikanji =

Lemon-based drink in the Indian subcontinent

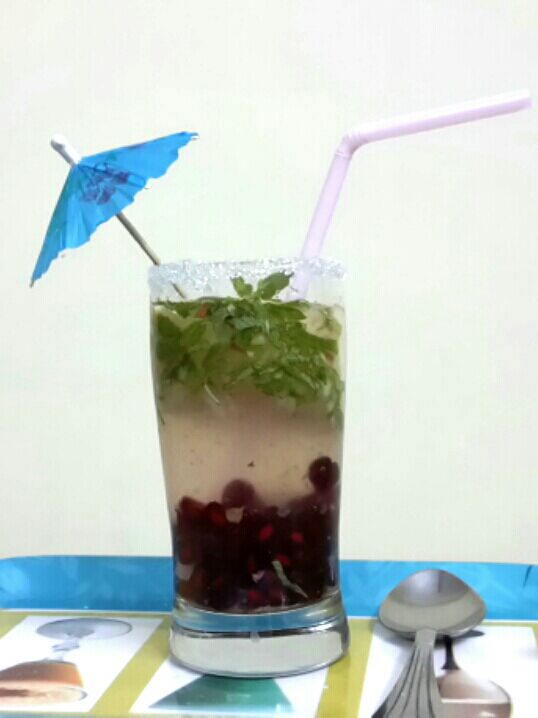
- Shikanji served with pomegranate, grated apple and mint.
- Course: Beverage
- Place of origin: Indian subcontinent
- Serving temperature: Chilled

Shikanji (alternative names include shikanjvi, shikanjbi and shikanjbeen) is a lemon drink which is similar to a lemonade or limeade but is distinct from these as it often contains other ingredients such as salt, saffron and cumin. It is popular as a summer drink in the Indian subcontinent.

It is named after sekanjabin or oxymel a traditional sweet-and-sour syrup from the Middle East. In the 10th century, Persian physician Ibn Sina wrote about its health benefits in a manuscript "Benefits of the drink called Sekanjabin"

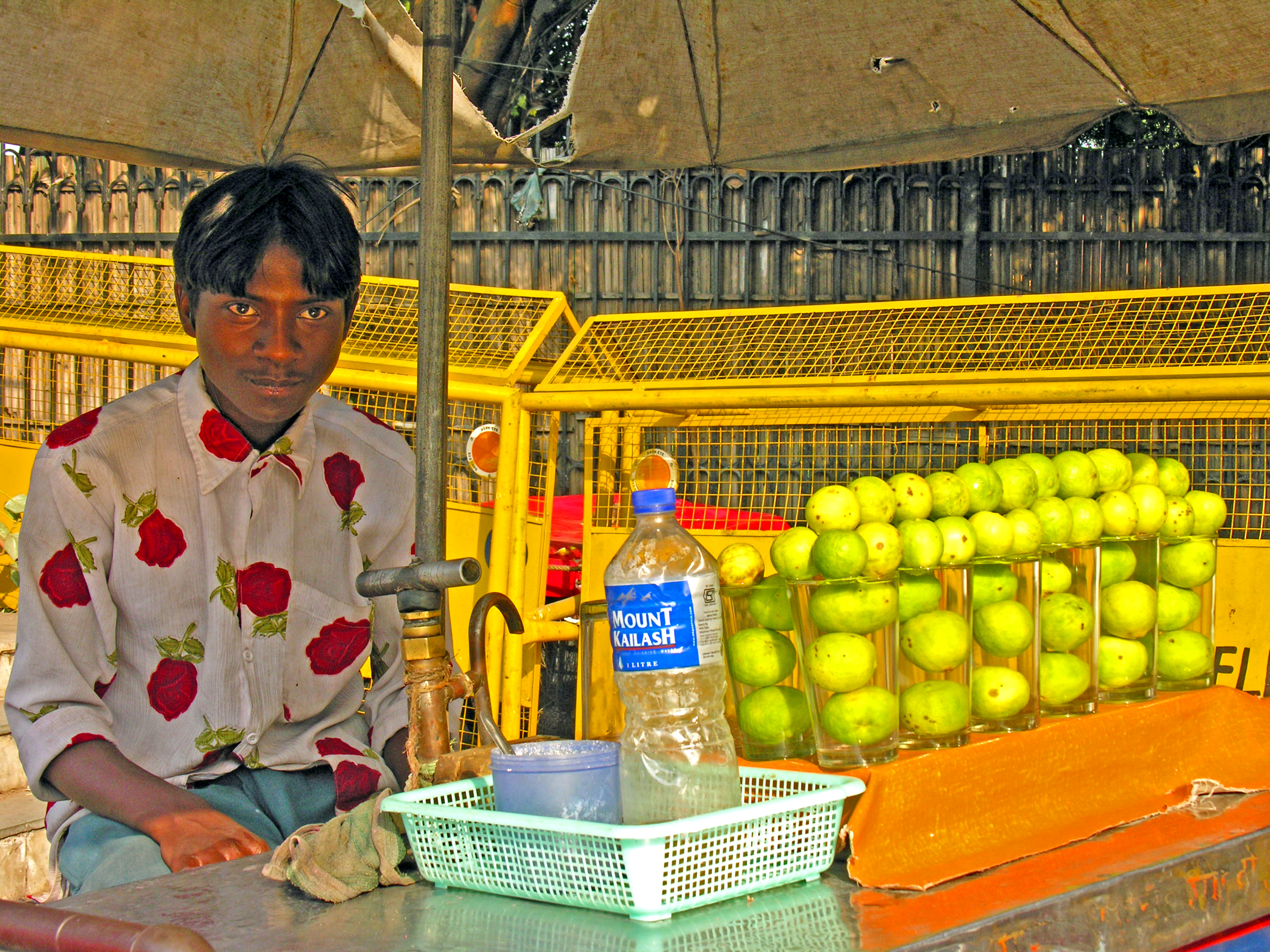
A Shikanji lemonade seller, outside Red Fort, Delhi, India. It is especially popular in North India, where street vendors sell it from earthen pots during summer.

== See also ==
- List of Indian drinks
- List of lemonade topics
- List of lemon dishes and beverages
- Lemonade
- Limeade
- Banta
