= Codd-neck bottle =

Glass bottle with marble stopper

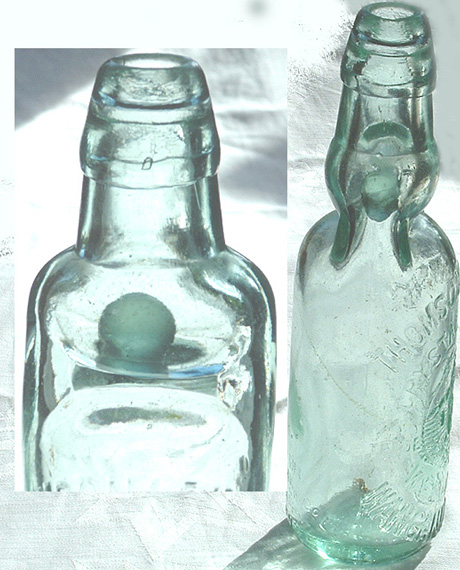
Codd-neck bottle

A Codd-neck bottle (more commonly known as a ramune bottle or a marble bottle) is a type of bottle used for carbonated drinks. It has a closing design based on a glass marble which is held against a rubber seal, which sits within a recess in the lip.

== Design ==
In 1872, soft-drink maker Hiram Codd of Camberwell, London, designed and patented a bottle designed specifically for carbonated drinks. The bottle was designed and manufactured with thick glass to withstand internal pressure, and a chamber to enclose a marble and a rubber washer in the neck. The bottles are filled upside down, and pressure of the gas in the bottle forces the marble against the washer, sealing in the carbonation. This use of pressure to aid in containment can be seen in other types of check valve.

The bottle is pinched into a special shape to provide a chamber into which the marble is pushed to open the bottle. This prevents the marble from blocking the neck as the drink is poured. Some older examples had the bullet shape of soda bottles.

== Popularity ==
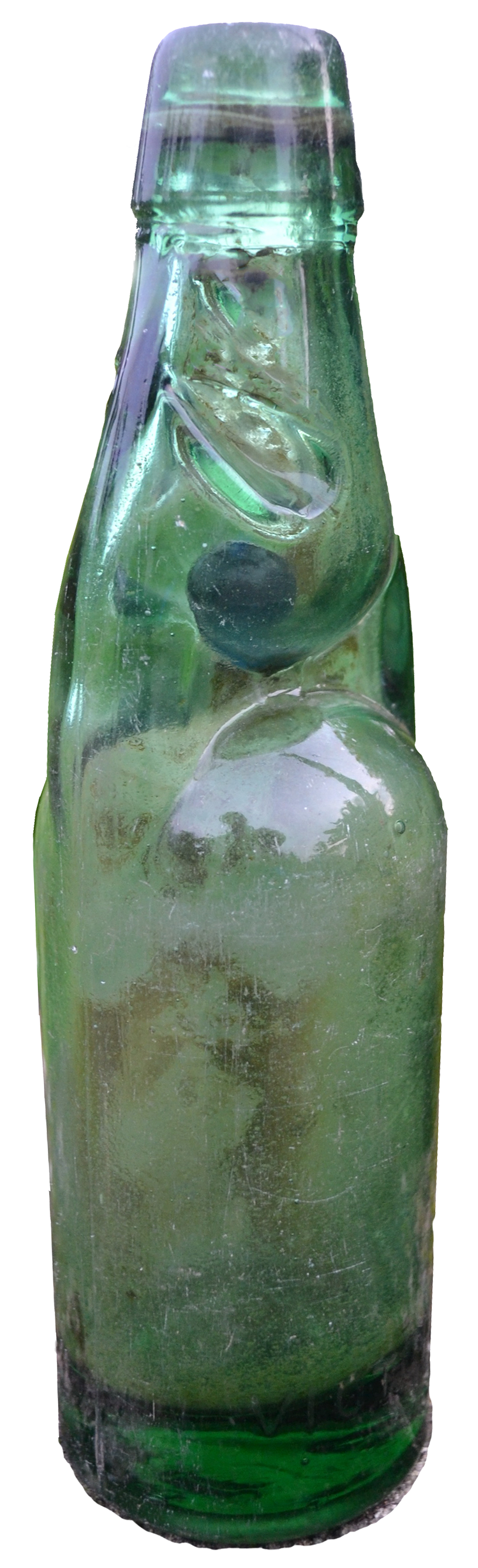
Banta in a Codd-neck bottle

Soon after its introduction, the bottle became extremely popular with the soft-drink and brewing industries mainly in Europe, India and Australasia, though some alcohol drinkers disdained the use of the bottle. One etymology of the term codswallop originates from beer sold in Codd's bottles, though this is generally dismissed as a folk etymology.

The bottles were regularly produced for many decades, but gradually declined in usage after the introduction of the steel crown cork bottlecap. Since children smashed the bottles to retrieve the marbles, vintage bottles are relatively scarce and have become collector items, particularly in the UK. Bilas, a company in Portugal, created a drink named after the bottle design (Pirulito). However, the marble inside did not seal the liquid; instead it was a normal cap which could be removed without breaking the bottle.

Codd bottles are still used for the Japanese soft drink ramune and the Indian drink banta.

== See also ==
- List of bottle types, brands and companies
