= Bangla (drink) =

Alcoholic beverage made from starch and sold in West Bengal

An empty bottle of Bangla liquor.

Bangla is an alcoholic beverage made from starch and sold in West Bengal. There are government licensed counters that sell this beverage. Bangla is a distilled country liquor. Notable Bengali liquor brand names are Uran, Captain, Pincon Bangla number one, Sengupta's Punch, Sengupta's Spark, Tarzan, Dada, Wonder, etc.

== Ingredients ==
Bangla is made from grains such as sorghum, bajra and wheat.

== Production and consumption ==
According to the government data of 2015, 48% of the West Bengal state's market share is Indian-made foreign liquor (IMFL), 39% is the Bangla drink. 11% of the market share is beer and the remaining 2% are occupied by wine and other spirits. Bangla is generally consumed by those who cannot afford other more expensive alcohol. The market, however, has been increasing for domestic liquor; this is due to a combination of a change in government policy that allows Bengali liquor to be sold in more outlets, improved production, better packaging, and new marketing strategies.

A major proportion of excise revenue in the state of West Bengal comes from cheap Bengali liquor. In the 2014-15 fiscal year, the figure reached 3,600 crore. It is a major Country Liquor in the state of West Bengal and accounts for a major share in the states excise revenue.
