= Hiram Codd =

English engineer and inventor

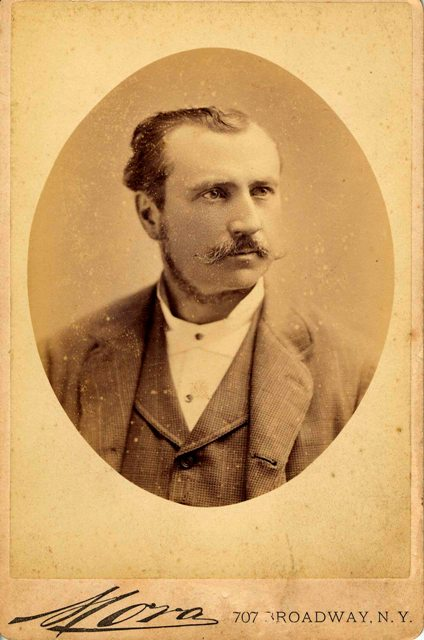
- Hiram Codd
- Born: 10 January 1838; Bury St Edmunds, Suffolk, England
- Died: 18 February 1887 (aged 49); Brixton Road, Brixton, London, England
- Occupation: Inventor
- Known for: Seals for carbonated beverages

Hiram Codd (10 January 1838 – 18 February 1887) was an English engineer and inventor. In 1872, he patented a bottle filled under gas pressure which pushed a marble against a rubber washer in the neck, creating a seal for soft drinks. This became known as the Codd-neck bottle.

== Early life ==
Codd was born in Bury St Edmunds, Suffolk, England, the son of Edwin Codd, a carpenter, who died in 1846 when Codd was 8 years old. He had two older brothers and an older sister.

On 5 February 1856, at the age of 18, he married Jane Colebrooke at Holy Trinity Church, Kensington & Chelsea, London. Early in his working life he became a mechanical engineer and at the age of 23, whilst working for the British and Foreign Cork Company, greatly improving the production of corks, he was offered the position of 'traveller for the business'. He recognised a need for better bottle filling machines and a new type of closure to reduce the need for corks.

== Invention of the Codd-neck bottle ==
In 1862 he brought out a patent for measuring the flow of liquids and in 1870 devised a patented bottling machine.

To understand the mineral water trade better and to prove the worth of his invention he experimented at a small mineral water works in the Caledonian Road, Islington, in London. Letters patent issued to him in November 1870 stated that he was a soda water manufacturer living at 6 Park Place, Islington.

Frederick Foster and William Brooke became early backers. In 1872 he was introduced to Richard Barrett, of London, whose two sons owned the Malvern Mineral Water Co. at Grove Lane, Camberwell. Barrett became Codd's partner. This enabled Codd to continue his research into his marble 'globe-stopper' idea and in particular the tool used to form the groove in the lip of the bottle and in 1873 he perfected his globe-stoppered bottle.

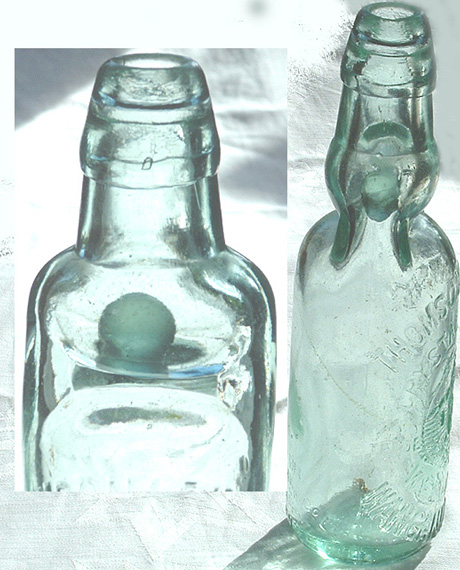
A Codd-neck bottle.

Mineral water soda manufacturers who wanted to use Codd's Globe Stopper bottles had to pay a yearly fee for a licence to use his patent bottle. By mid-1873 he had granted 20 licences and received a further 50 applications. This was boosted further by a Trade Show held in London in the same year. By 1874 the licence was free to bottle manufacturers as long as they purchased the marbles, sealing rings and used his groove tool, and the mineral water firms they traded with had already bought a licence to use his bottle. Codd had two factories in London solely producing marbles, one in Kennington and the other in Camberwell, which was run by F. Barrett, the son of his financial backer.

== Hope Glass Works ==
In September 1873 he met Ben Rylands, and by 1877 they formed a partnership and started the Hope Glass Works in Barnsley. They remained partners until Rylands's death in 1881.

During this period he still had a separate partnership with Richard Barrett, who let Codd look after the day-to-day running of their interests. Late in 1881, owing to failing health, Barrett retired and passed the management of the Codd's Patents solely to Hiram Codd. His Malvern Mineral Water Works and both marble producing factories continued to thrive and he was still involved with Frederick Foster and William Brooke, his early backers.

A soft drink bottle designed by Codd

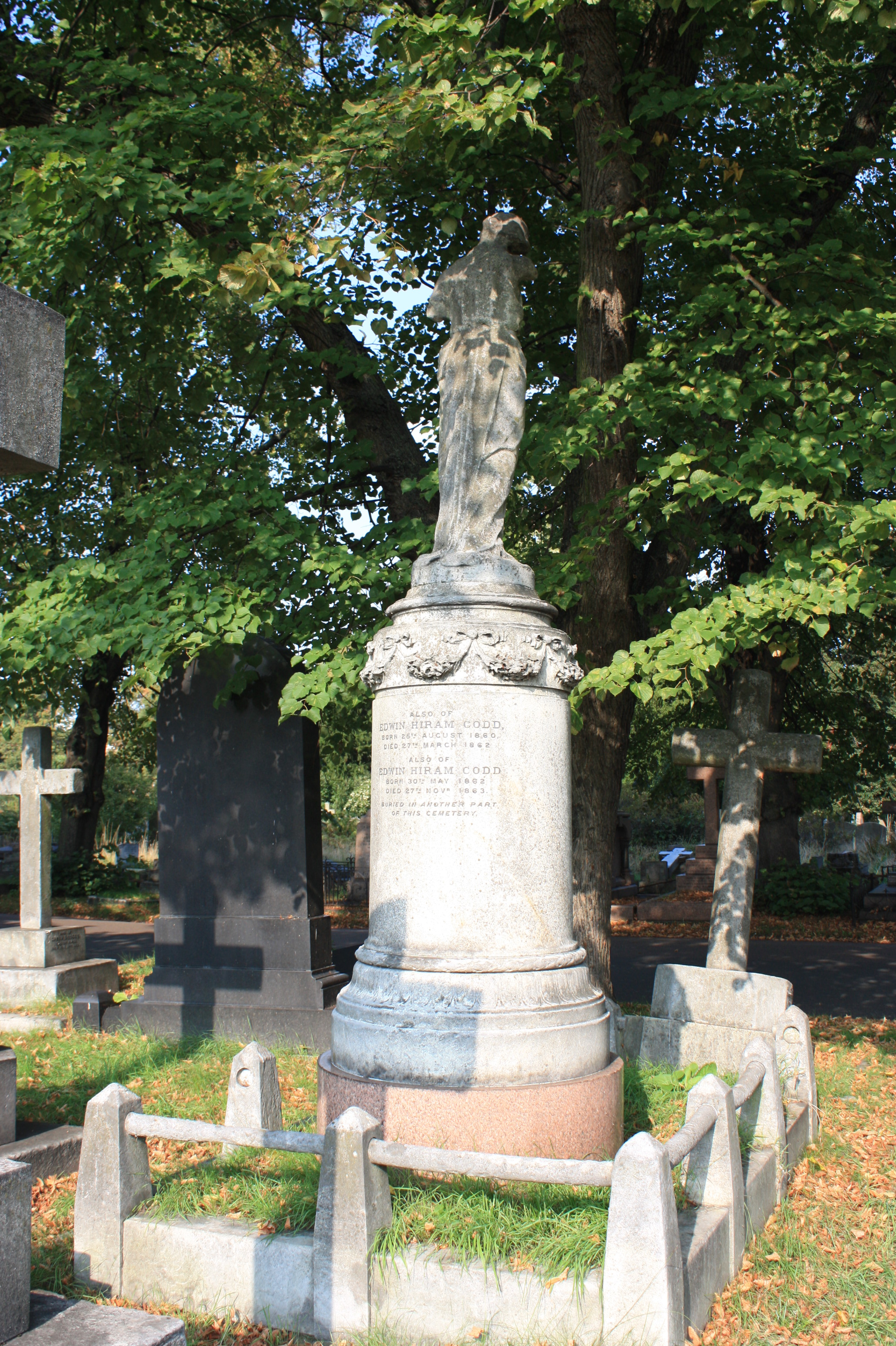
The Codd monument, Brompton Cemetery, London

In 1880 Codd instigated the idea of a bottle exchange in London. This was slow to start but eventually caught on in London and all over the country. Many thousands of empty bottles could be returned to their original owners via bottle exchanges. Agents charged a small fee on each bottle for providing this service (one penny per each 144 bottles).

Dan Rylands took over the partnership after his father's death, and in 1882 they patented 'the crystal' (valve codd).

On 6 October 1884, Codd allowed his partner to buy him out of the business and started trading at 41 Gracechurch Street, London.

In February of the same year, his wife died aged 54; they had four surviving children: Ada Louisa, Maud M, Edith J, and Alfred Charles. Codd married his second wife, Elizabeth Brundell (whose brother worked for the firm) in June 1885.

As he did not renew any of his earlier patents, his products could now be manufactured without fear of prosecution. Early examples of these bottles sometimes have "CODD'S EXPIRED PATENT" embossed on them.

== Death and legacy ==
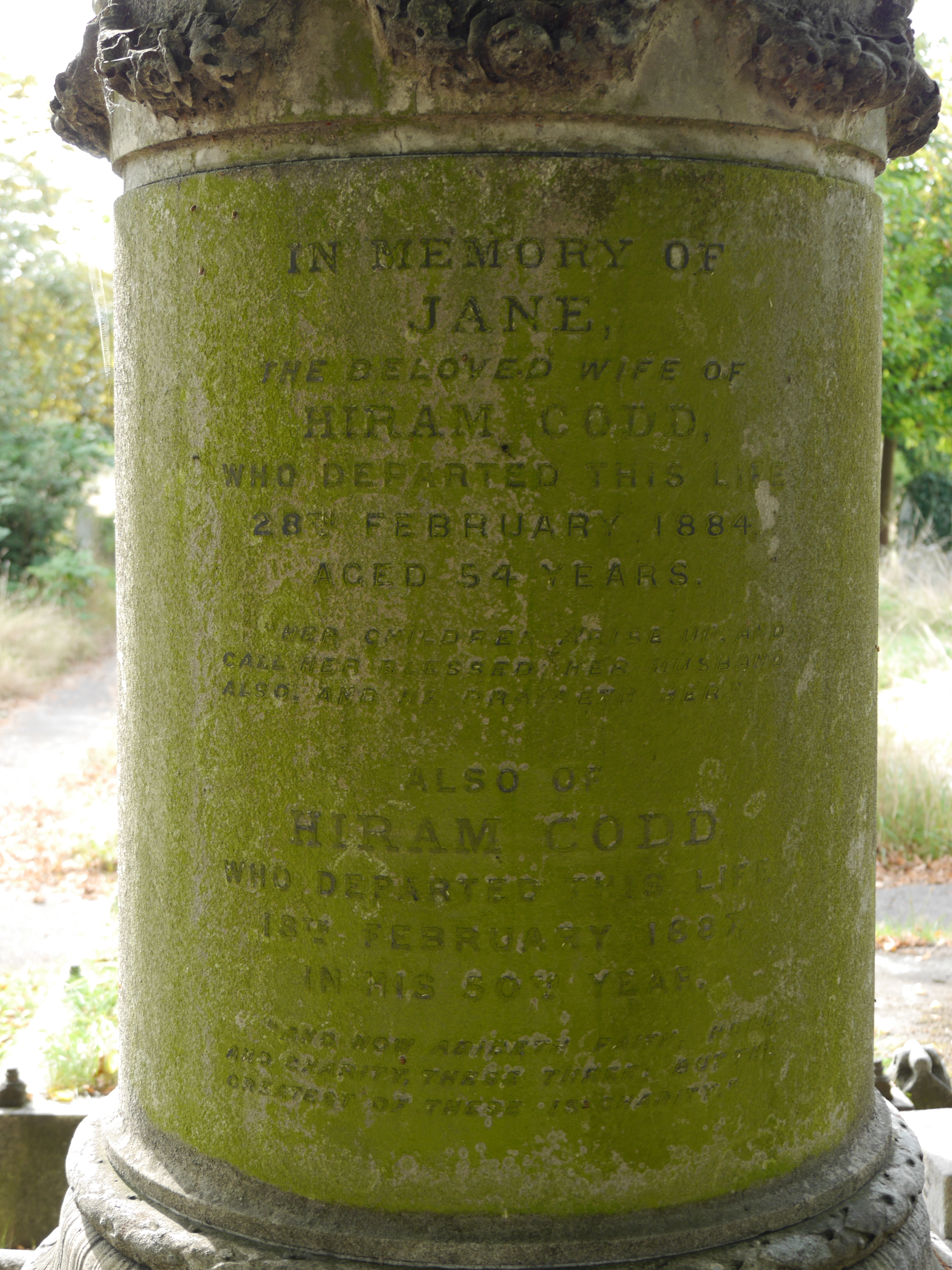
Brompton Cemetery, monument (detail)

He died at his family home, Suffolk Lodge, 162 Brixton Road, Brixton, London, on 18 February 1887 from "congestion of the brain and chronic disease of the liver and kidneys" and is buried in London's Brompton Cemetery. The family monument lies between the central and western path, midway between the north entrance and the central buildings.

Codd's patented globe stopper bottle is still manufactured in India by the Khandelwal glass works. His earlier bottles are prized by antique bottle collectors worldwide.

Codd-neck bottles are also mass-produced for the popular Japanese soft drink, Ramune, which is produced in a wide variety of flavours by Shirakiku.

== See also ==
- List of bottle types, brands and companies
- Ramune
