= Aam panna =

Indian and Pakistani drink

Aam Panna
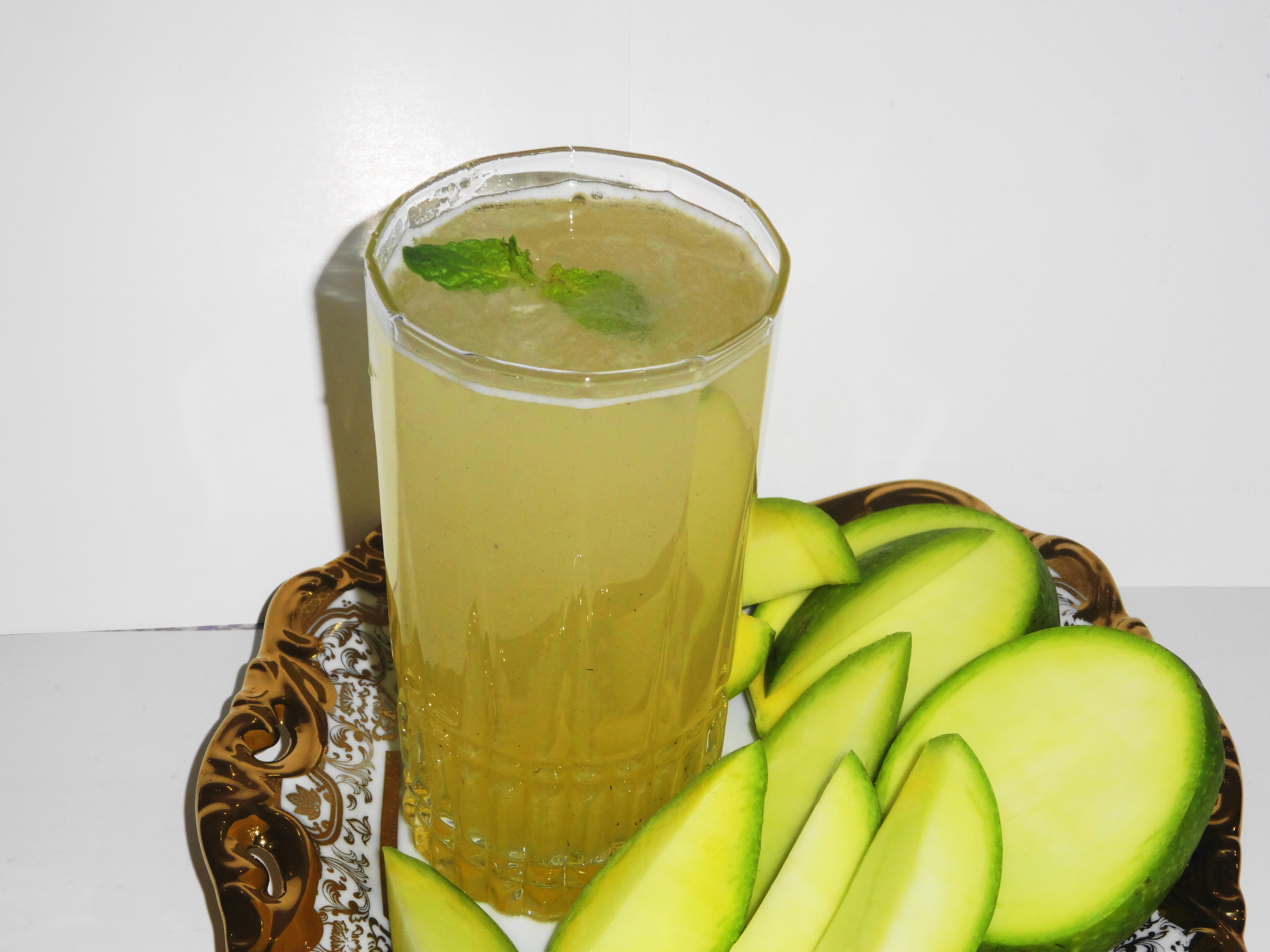
- Aam Panna/Aam Jhora served in India
- Course: Beverage
- Place of origin: India
- Associated cuisine: India
- Serving temperature: Chilled
- Main ingredients: Raw mangoes

Aam Panna is an Indian drink made from unripe mangoes; it is yellow to light green in color. Mint leaves are often added to the drink, enhancing its green color.

Unripe mango is a rich source of pectin, which gradually diminishes after the formation of the stone. Unripe mango is sour in taste because of the presence of oxalic, citric and malic acids.

Aam panna or Kairiche Panha, which is prepared using raw mangoes, cumin, and an assortment of other spices, quenches thirst and prevents the excessive loss of sodium chloride and iron during summer due to excessive sweating. The drink is mainly consumed in Western India, and is considered beneficial in the treatment of gastrointestinal disorders. It is also a good source of vitamin B_{1} and B_{2}, niacin, and vitamin C. In Indian culture, it is regarded as a tonic believed to increase resistance against tuberculosis, anemia, cholera and dysentery.

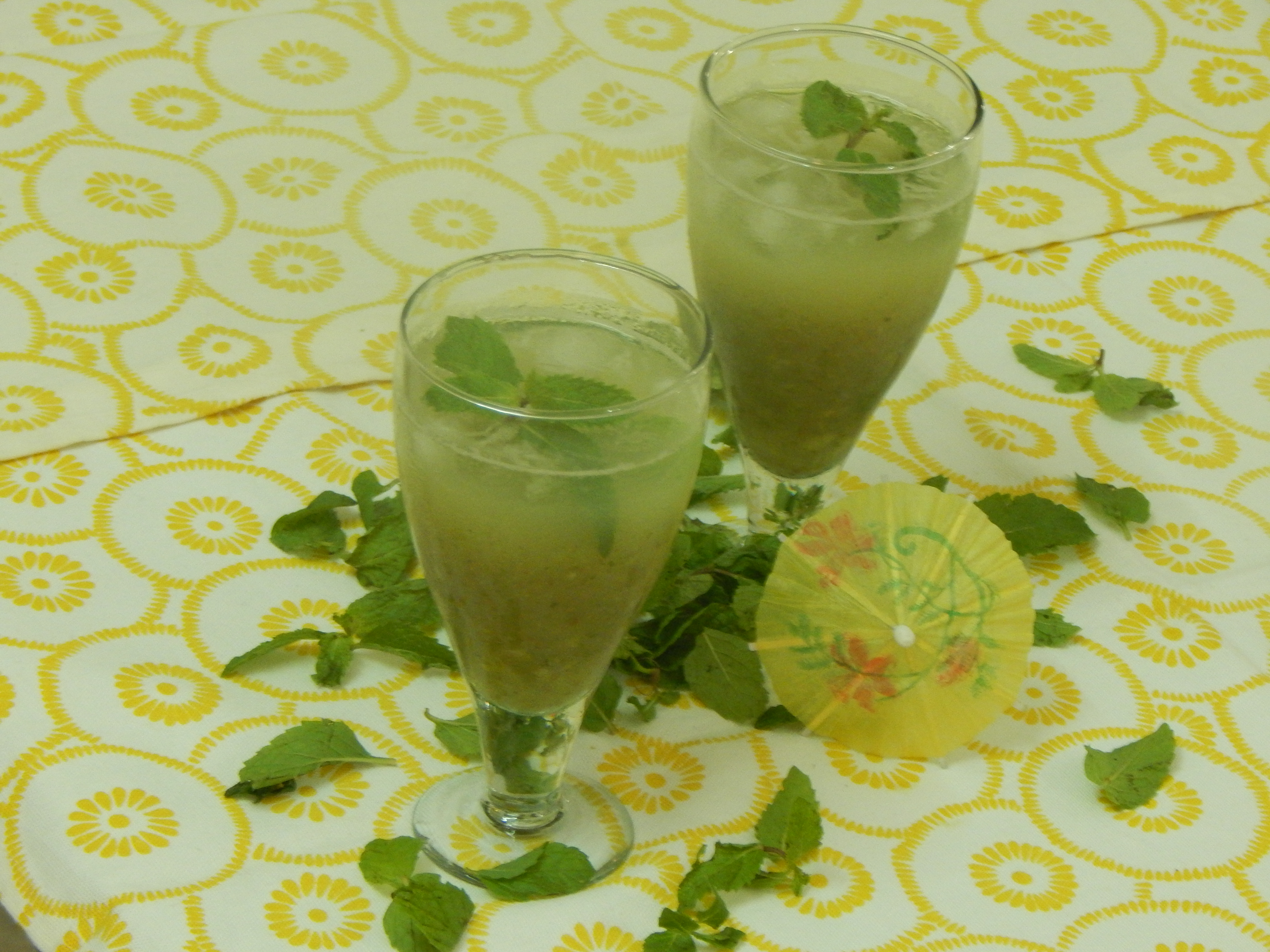
Aam Panna/Aam Jhora with mint leaves

== See also ==
- List of Indian beverages
