= Fuljar Soda =

Indian non-alcoholic beverage

Fuljar Soda is a non-alcoholic beverage originating from Kerala, India. It gained popularity due to its preparation and "volcanic" fizzing effect.

== History and origin ==
Fuljar Soda emerged in Kerala, particularly in the Malabar region, and became a trend around 2019. While its inventor remains unknown, it gained traction as a drink during the month of Ramadan. Its spread was largely fuelled by videos on TikTok and YouTube, showcasing its preparation and the challenge of drinking it quickly.

The drink first became popular in Kerala around 2019, especially during the Holy month of Ramadan and spread quickly through social media videos for its dramatic fizzing preparation.

== Preparation ==
The preparation of Fuljar Soda involves two main components, in a shot glass and a larger glass

A small shot glass is filled with a concentrate. Common ingredients for this mixture include:

- Mint leaves
- Green chilies (often a less spicy variety for taste rather than extreme heat)
- Ginger
- Lime juice
- Sugar or sugar syrup
- Black salt (Kala Namak)
- Chaat masala
- Sometimes, basil seeds (sabja seeds) are added for their cooling properties and texture.
- Coriander leaves, cumin powder, and even neem leaves or cinnamon can be included in some variations. These ingredients are typically blended or muddled into a smooth paste.

A larger serving glass is mostly filled with chilled club soda (or sometimes ginger ale or Sprite).

While the mint, ginger, and green chili combination is classic, Fuljar Soda has other variations.

The shot glass containing the concentrated mixture is then dropped into the larger glass of soda. This causes a vigorous fizzing and frothing reaction, often overflowing the glass, resembling a small volcanic eruption. The drink is meant to be consumed quickly, ideally in one gulp, while it is still actively fizzing.

== Cultural impact and popularity ==
Fuljar Soda became a culinary fad, especially among youngsters in Kerala. Its visual appeal and the interactive nature of its consumption made it highly shareable on social media. Juice bars and street vendors across Kerala (and subsequently in neighbouring states like Tamil Nadu) began offering the drink.
