= Aadi Thallupadi =

Annual retail sale in Tamil Nadu, India

Aadi Thallupadi (transl. Aadi discount) is a sale in Tamil Nadu, India that happens from mid-July to mid-August. The sale causes high amount of crowds especially in clothing stores.

== Background ==
To sale was introduced to attract customers during the Tamil month of Aadi, which is known to be an inauspicious time. The sale was inspired by the Ashadha sale that the store KalaNiketan introduced in Mumbai in 1965. Aadi Thallupadi brings significant crowd to T. Nagar in Chennai, which is a hub for many stores. The sale happens in several places in Tamil Nadu including Madurai, Trichy, Coimbatore, etc. The ads about the sales happen prior to the month of Aadi. The sale and its heavy marketing campaign have been the subject of memes.

During the COVID-19 pandemic in 2020, video shopping was used to allow consumers to buy from their homes.
