= Jal-jeera =

Drink

Jal Jeera
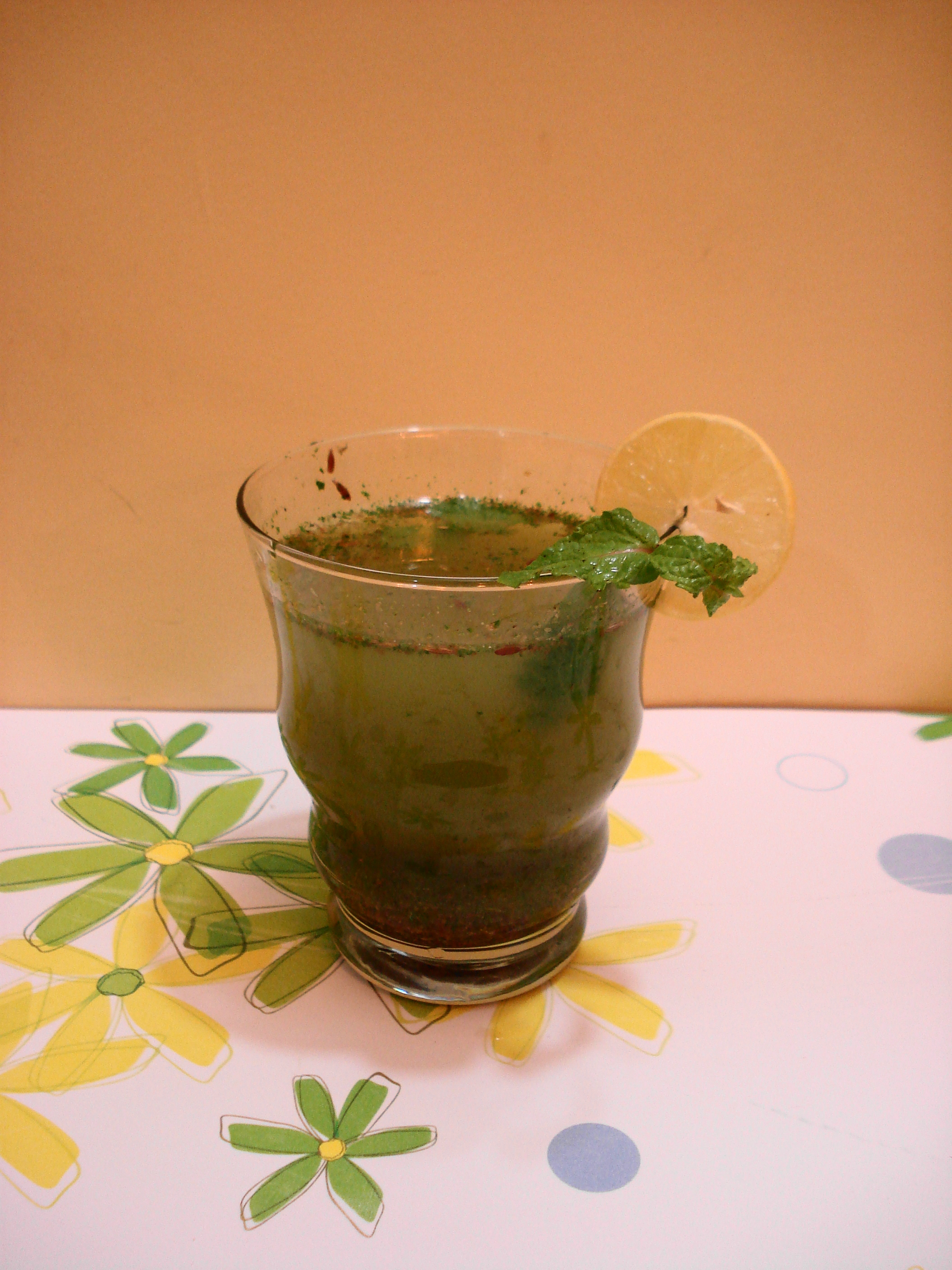
- Jal Jeera drinks
- Place of origin: India
- Region or state: North India
- Main ingredients: Water, cumin, ginger, black pepper, black salt, mint

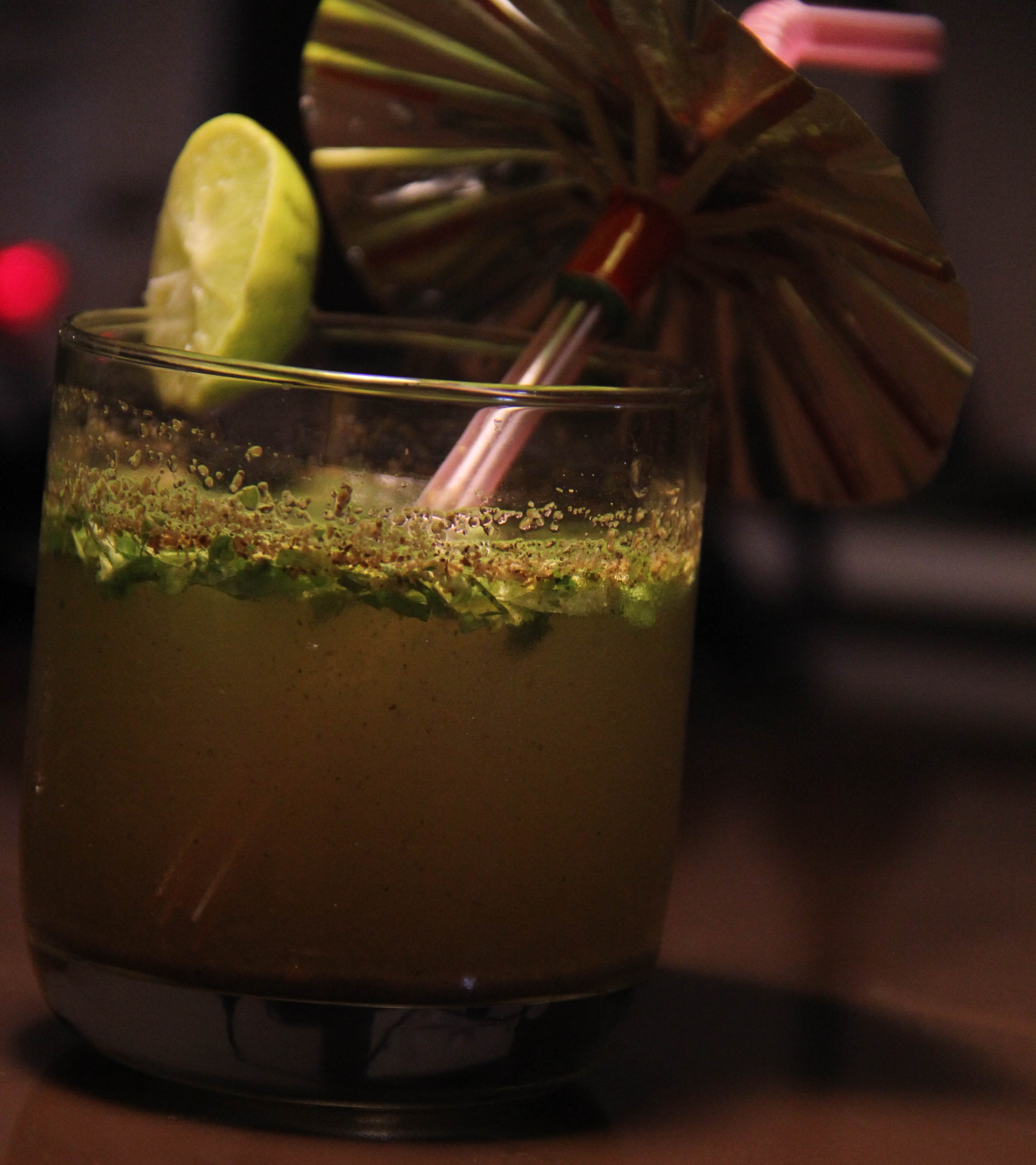
Jal jeera mocktail in a pub in Gurgaon

Jal-jeera is an Indian beverage. It is flavored with a spice mix known as jal-jeera powder. Jaljira spices can include of cumin, ginger, black pepper, mint, black salt, fruit powder, and chili or hot pepper powder.

At one time the powder was ground on stone slabs, and stored in clay pots.

It is a popular drink in North India, traditionally served chilled and valued for its cooling and digestive properties.

== See also ==
- Jeera water
- List of Indian beverages
