= Rubber washer =

Rubber ring used in mechanical devices

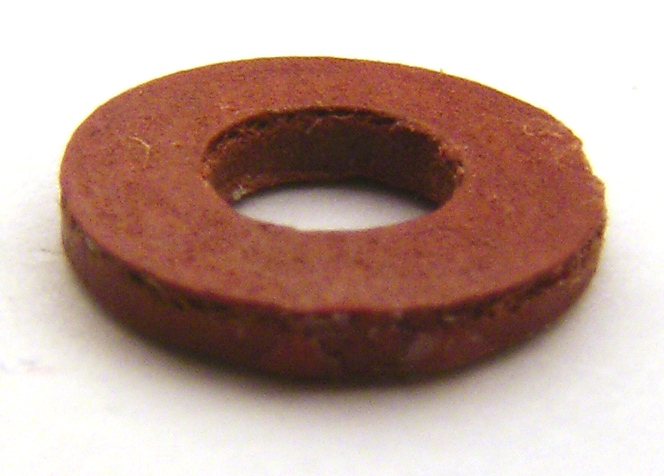

A rubber washer is a ring made of rubber used in mechanical devices. It is used to prevent vibration from spreading from one part to another, reducing the noise levels.

Typical uses are mounting computer parts, like fans and hard disk drives. By decoupling the motor from the computer case it prevents the resonance chamber effect from amplifying the noise.
