= Alcohol laws of India =

The legal drinking age in India and the laws which regulate the sale and consumption of alcohol vary significantly from state to state. In India, consumption of alcohol is prohibited in the states of Bihar, Gujarat, Nagaland, and Mizoram, as well as the union territory of Lakshadweep. There is partial ban on alcohol in some districts of Manipur. All other Indian states permit alcohol consumption but fix a legal drinking age, which ranges at different ages per region. In some states the legal drinking age can be different for different types of alcoholic beverage.

In spite of legal restrictions, alcohol consumption in India has risen over 55% over a period of 20 years (according to OECD figures) as the laws are generally not followed in a customer business relationship. The maximum permitted ABV is 45.5%.

== History ==
The Prohibition on Alcohol was first initiated in 1954 by Morarji Desai who was Chief Minister of Bombay Province. The Prohibition was imposed on the Koli people who were traditional distillers of alcohol or wine in Maharashtra mostly in Dharavi. Kolis of Bombay distilled the alcohol of Jamun, Guava, Orange, Apple and Chikoo. In 1954, Morarji Desai imposed the Prohibition on liquor but there were strong protests by the Koli community. Koli's alleged the Desai that 'This is not a Daru-Bandi, This is Desh-Bandi', due to the Desai administration's allowance on the selling foreign alcohol in the state and prohibitions on homemade liquor. Before the prohibition on alcohol, Kolis of Dharavi manufactured the alcohol legally and when prohibition enacted, commercial alcohol production ceased and Kolis had a virtual monopoly in this area.

== Law ==
Alcohol is a subject in the State List under the Seventh Schedule of the Constitution of India. Therefore, the laws governing alcohol vary from state to state.

Liquor in India is generally sold at liquor stores, restaurants, hotels, bars, pubs, clubs and discos but not online. Some states, like Kerala and Tamil Nadu, prohibit private parties from owning liquor stores making the state government the sole retailer of alcohol in those states. In some states, liquor may be sold at groceries, departmental stores, banquet halls and/or farm houses. Some tourist areas have special laws allowing the sale of alcohol on beaches and houseboats.

Home delivery of alcoholic beverages is illegal in Delhi. However, in Delhi home delivery of beer and wine by private vendors and departmental stores is permitted.

In January 2025, the Government of Madhya Pradesh implemented a ban on the sale of liquor in 17 religious towns across the state, including Ujjain, Orchha, Salkanpur, Chitrakoot, Omkareshwar, Maheshwar, Maihar, Amarkantak, and the Pashupatinath temple area in Mandsaur.

== Legal drinking age by states and union territories ==
State/UT	Drinking Age	Remarks
Andaman and Nicobar Islands	21	
Andhra Pradesh	21	
Arunachal Pradesh	21	
Assam	21	
Bihar	Illegal	Total ban on all alcohol since 4 April 2016
Chandigarh	25	
Chhattisgarh	21	
Dadra and Nagar Haveli and Daman and Diu	21	
Delhi	25	
Goa	18	
Gujarat	Illegal	Non-Residents of Gujarat can apply for limited Liquor Permits. Banned since 1960.
Haryana	21	The Punjab Excise Act, which also extends to Haryana, prohibits establishments from employing "women in any part of such premises in which such liquor or intoxicating drug is consumed by the public". Section 30 of the Punjab Excise Act has been declared unconstitutional by the Supreme Court of India on 12 December 2007, which was responsible for not allowing women to work in such premises.
Himachal Pradesh	18	
Jammu and Kashmir	21	
Jharkhand	21	
Karnataka	18*	Arrack has been banned in Karnataka since 1 July 2007. The Karanataka Excise Department, 1967, stipulate that drinking age is 21. However, the Karnataka Excise Act, 1965, states 18 as the minimum age to purchase alcohol. The law is ambiguous and in practise many bars serve those above age 18 though a few bars refuse service to anyone below 21.
Kerala	23	Kerala government has planned to implement prohibition of hard liquor in 10 years. However the subsequent government has not confirmed proceeding with the prohibition and has reversed the restriction of hard liquor to only five star hotels.
Ladakh	18	
Lakshadweep	Illegal	Consumption is legal only on the resort island of Bangaram.
Madhya Pradesh	21	
Maharashtra	25	In Maharashtra, a liquor licence obtained from a Government Civil Hospital is required to drink, although this is largely not enforced. Additionally, state legislature empowers district governments to ban alcohol entirely. As a result, two districts, Wardha and Gadchiroli have imposed a total ban on the production and sale of alcohol.
Manipur	21	Partial prohibition since 2002, prohibited in the districts of Bishnupur, Imphal East, Imphal West and Thoubal
Meghalaya	21	
Mizoram	Illegal	Banned since 2019
Nagaland	Illegal	Sale and consumption illegal since 1989.
Odisha	21	
Puducherry	18	
Punjab	25	The Punjab Excise Act prohibits establishments from employing "women in any part of such premises in which such liquor or intoxicating drug is consumed by the public". Section 30 of the Punjab Excise Act has been declared unconstitutional by the Supreme Court of India on 12 December 2007, which was responsible for not allowing women to work in such premises.
Rajasthan	18	
Sikkim	18	
Tamil Nadu	21	
Telangana	21	
Tripura	21	
Uttar Pradesh	21	Section 22
Uttarakhand	21	
West Bengal	21	

== Drunk driving law ==
The blood alcohol content (BAC) legal limit is 0.03% or 30 mg alcohol in 100 ml blood.

On 1 March 2012, the Union Cabinet approved proposed changes to the Motor Vehicle Act. Higher penalties were introduced, including fines from ₹2,000 (equivalent to ₹4,100 or US$44 in 2026) to ₹10,000 (equivalent to ₹21,000 or US$220 in 2026) and imprisonment from 6 months to 4 years. Different penalties are assessed depending on the blood alcohol content at the time of the offence.

== Dry days ==
Dry days are specific days when the sale of alcohol is not allowed. Most of the Indian states observe these days on major national festivals/occasions such as Republic Day (26 January), Independence Day (15 August) and Gandhi Jayanti (2 October). Dry days are also observed during elections in India.

=== Dry days by states and union territories ===
No dry day rule is applicable for 5-star hotels, clubs and resorts in West Bengal. Drinks may be served and consumed in those places in West Bengal even on dry days. Private consumption too is allowed on dry days. Only the open sale of liquor at restaurants, liquor shops and other permitted places is disallowed on those days.

Prohibited days are also announced when elections are held in the state. For Lok Sabha or Vidhan Sabha elections, Prohibited days are declared for 48 hours prior to the close of voting, plus during the counting day(s). For Municipality, Panchayat, Municipal Corporation, or Darjeeling Gorkha Hill Council elections, Prohibited days occur on the polling day, the previous day and the counting day(s).

==== Andaman and Nicobar Islands ====
Retail shops are closed on every month on the 7th, which is the pay day / salary day in this union territory, and on 2nd & 4th Tuesdays of every month. Plus, a maximum of two fulls or four beers are permitted per person for sale in retail shops.

Month	Date	Festival
January	26	Republic Day
August	15	Independence Day
October	2	Gandhi Jayanti

==== Delhi ====
Every excise year, the Government of Delhi, notifies the number of Prohibited days in a year. The three national holidays—26 January 2 October and 15 August, are always prohibited days, and additional prohibited days are announced at the start of the excise year (1 July).

Month	Date	Festival
January	26	Republic Day
August	15	Independence Day
October	2	Gandhi Jayanti

==== Jammu and Kashmir ====
Jammu

Month	Date	Festival
March	4	Maha Shivratri
April		Ram Navami^{†}
August	15	Independence Day
August		Krishna Janmashtami^{†}
September		Krishna Janmashtami^{†}
October	2	Gandhi Jayanti
November		Guru Nanak Jayanti

†Festival date may be in either month.

Kashmir

Month	Date	Festival
March	4	Maha Shivratri
June	4–5	Eid-Ul-Fitr
August	11	Eid al-Adha (Bakrid)
August	15	Independence Day
August		Krishna Janmashtami^{†}
September		Krishna Janmashtami^{†}
October	2	Gandhi Jayanti
November	9–10	Eid-Ul-Milad

†Festival date may be in either month.

==== Karnataka ====
Month	Date	Festival
October	2	Gandhi Jayanti

==== Kerala ====
Sundays are no longer observed as Prohibited days in the state.

1st Day of English Calendar Every month for administrative purposes and on the grounds that it is the salary day. Dry days are observed on the day of polling and the previous day during elections as well.

Month	Date	Festival
January	1	New Year Day
January	26	Republic Day
August	15	Independence Day
August		Sree Narayana Guru Jayanti^{†}
September		Sree Narayana Guru Jayanti^{†}
September	21	Sree Narayana Guru Samadhi
October	2	Gandhi Jayanti

†Date may be in either month.

==== Maharashtra ====
The district collector can also designate any day as a Prohibited day by giving seven days' notice. his list may vary depending on the date of festivals as well as specific Prohibited day announcements by the Government of Maharashtra.

Month	Date	Festival
January	26	Republic Day
January	30	Martyrs' Day
May	1	Maharashtra Day
June		Ashadi Ekadashi^{†}
July		Ashadi Ekadashi^{†}
August	15	Independence Day
September		Anant Chaturdashi
October	2-9	Gandhi Week
November		Kartiki Ekadashi

†Festival date may be in either month.

==== Rajasthan ====
Month	Date	Festival
January	26	Republic Day
January	30	Martyrs' Day
February		Maha Shivaratri
March	30	Rajasthan Formation Day
March		Mahavir Janma Kalyanak^{†}
April		Mahavir Janma Kalyanak^{†}
August	15	Independence Day
October	2	Gandhi Jayanti
October	30	Harijan Day

†Festival date may be in either month.

==== Tamil Nadu ====
Month	Date	Festival
January	15	Thiruvalluvar Day^{†}
January	16	Thiruvalluvar Day^{†}
January	26	Republic Day
January		Vadalur Ramalinga Adikalar Jothi^{†}
February		Vadalur Ramalinga Adikalar Jothi^{†}
February		Maha Shivaratri
March		Mahavir Janma Kalyanak^{†}
April		Mahavir Janma Kalyanak^{†}
April		Prophet Mohamad's Birthday (Nabigal Nayagam)
May	1	May Day
August	15	Independence Day
October	2	Gandhi Jayanti
December		Eid al-Mawlid (Milad-un-Nabi)

†Leap year (will vary based on Tamil calendar) †Festival date may be in either month.

==== West Bengal ====
Month	Date	Festival
January	26	Republic Day
February/March		Holi^{†}
August	15	Independence Day
June/July/August		Muharram^{†}
October	2	Gandhi Jayanti

†Festival date may be in either month.

== See also ==
- India alcohol related
  - Alcohol prohibition in India
  - Dry Days in India
  - Kasauli Brewery, India's first European-style brewery still in operation
  - Solan brewery
- Alcoholic Indian beverages
  - Beer in India
  - List of vedic and ayurvedic alcoholic drinks
  - Desi daru
  - Indian-made foreign liquor
  - Indian whisky
  - Lion beer, Asia's first beer brand
  - Solan No. 1, India's first malt whisky
  - Old Monk, iconic Indian rum
  - Sura
