= Alcohol prohibition in India =

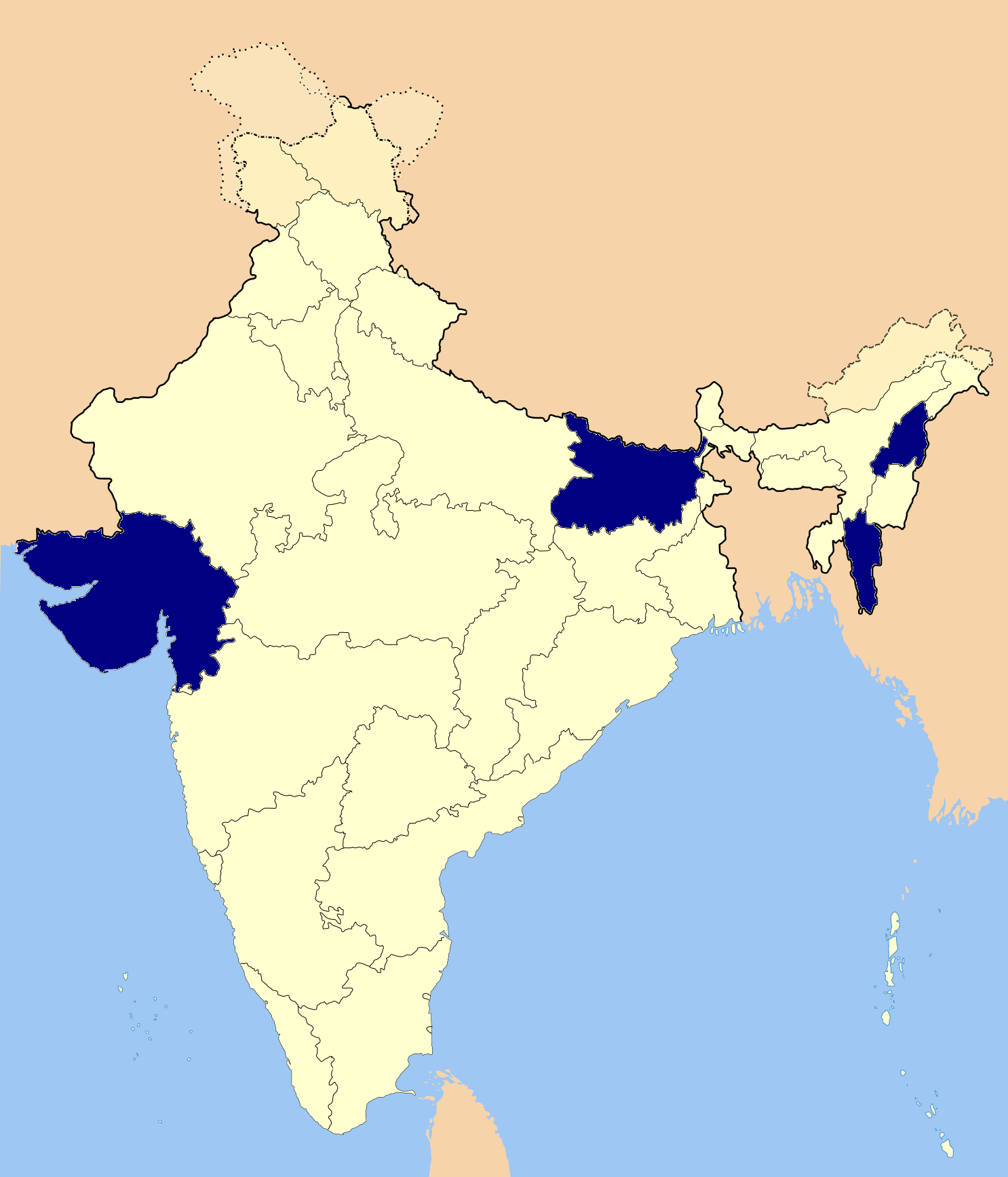
States with alcohol prohibition

Sale and consumption of alcoholic liquor for human consumption is prohibited in the states of Bihar, Gujarat, Mizoram, and Nagaland. All other Indian states and union territories permit the sale and consumption of alcohol.

The directive principles of state policy (DPSP) in the constitution of India (article 47) state that "....the State shall endeavor to bring about prohibition of the consumption except for medicinal purposes of intoxicating drinks and of drugs which are injurious to health". The Directive Principles are not-justiciable rights of the people but fundamental in the governance of the country. It shall be the duty of the State to apply these principles in making policy laws per Article 47. Per Article 38, state and union governments, as duty, shall make further detailed policies and laws for implementation considering DPSPs as fundamental policy.

National prohibition was advocated by Mahatma Gandhi, as well as by many Indian women. Prohibition in the states of India that have implemented the policy has led to lower rates of drinking among men, as well as a decreased incidence of violence against women.

== History ==
Alcohol prohibition in India in 1954

The temperance movement in India often led to the prohibition of alcohol in various states, as with Manipur. In British India, many Indian temperance activists agitated for prohibition in the country. Mahatma Gandhi was a champion of the temperance movement and viewed foreign rule as an obstacle to national prohibition. When India gained independence in 1947, "prohibition was included in the Directive Principles of the Constitution of India and the government of several states such as Gujarat introduced it."

== Summary of state laws ==
Alcohol prohibitions in Indian states
State		Type	Law enacted	Law repealed
Madras State		Total	1948	?
Andhra Pradesh		Total	1995	1997
Andhra Pradesh		Partial	1993	In force
Bihar		Total	1977	1980
Bihar		Total	2016	In force
Bombay State		Total	1950	1960
Gujarat		Total	1960	In force
Haryana		Total	1996	1998
Kerala		Partial	1996	In force
Lakshadweep		Total	1979	In force
Maharashtra		Total	1960	1964
Maharashtra	Chandrapur	Total	2015	2023
Maharashtra	Wardha	Total	1950	In force
Maharashtra	Gadchiroli	Total	1992	In force
Manipur		Total	1991	2002
Manipur		Partial	2002	2023
Mizoram		Total	1997	2014
Mizoram		Total	2019	In force
Nagaland		Total	1989	In force
Orissa		Total	1994	1995
Rajasthan		Partial	1986	1989
Tamil Nadu		Total	1951	1971
Tamil Nadu		Total	1974	1981
Tamil Nadu		Total	1987	1990
Tamil Nadu		Total	1991	2001
Uttar Pradesh		Partial	1993	1998

== States practicing prohibition ==
=== Bihar ===
On 26 November 2015, Bihar Chief Minister Nitish Kumar announced that alcohol would be banned in the state from 1 April 2016. Kumar officially declared the total ban on 5 April 2016, and said in a press conference, "All type of liquor will be banned in the state from today. Sale [and consumption] of any type of alcohol in hotels, bars, clubs and any other place will be illegal from today onwards." Violating the law carries a penalty of 5 years to 10 years imprisonment. On 30 September 2016, the Patna High Court ruled that the ban is "illegal, impractical and unconstitutional". Although even before the High Court order came, the Bihar government had announced that it would enforce a new stringent law from 2 October 2016, only to stay adamant on it after the order. The government had drafted a new law to keep from withdrawing the ban. As per the new liquor law, those found indulging in the unlawful import, export, transport, manufacture, possession or sale of an intoxicant or liquor could attract a minimum 10 years of jail term which may extend to imprisonment for life besides a minimum fine of Rs 100,000 which may extend to Rs 1,000,000. On 3 October 2016, the Bihar government approached the Supreme Court of India challenging the High Court order. The Supreme Court Bench headed by Chief Justice T. S. Thakur agreed to give an urgent hearing on the matter and on 7 October 2016, much to the relief of the government, the bench stayed the high court order. "Ban on liquor and fundamental rights do not go together," the SC bench said. The bench directed the hearing of the matter after 10 weeks. On 25 October 2016, the state government decided to renew liquor licences of canteens in cantonment areas, military and air force stations for 2016–2017 in the "interest of soldiers". On 21 January 2017, more than 3 crore (30 million) people of Bihar joined hands to form a historic human chain along 12,760 km of roads to support the ban on alcohol, which was supported by people from all walks of life and political parties.

The Government of Bihar introduced a new version of the Bihar Prohibition and Excise Act on 2 October 2016, days after the Patna High Court quashed the previous bill, deeming it as "illegal". The act brought in stricter measures, with all Sections in the act being non-bailable and the police being allowed to assume that manufacturing of alcohol was ongoing if utensils containing a mix of jaggery or grapes are found. Under the law, only special courts constituted under Bihar Special Courts Act can try the cases. It also empowered authorities to confiscate properties upon whose premises liquor is either consumed or stored. The new policy was challenged in the Patna High Court a day later. The Supreme Court meanwhile stayed Patna High Court's order on quashing Bihar's ban on alcohol. It stayed proceedings of all challenges to Bihar's new law in the Patna High Court on 2 January 2017, stating that it will itself hear all cases related to the new ban. However, the Bihar government introduced an amendment to the liquor law in the upcoming monsoon session of Bihar assembly beginning 20 July. According to the new amendment, first time offenders will not face a mandatory jail term if they pay a fine of Rs. 50,000.

=== Gujarat ===
Bombay State had prohibition between 1948 and 1950, and again from 1958. Gujarat has a sumptuary law in force that proscribes the manufacture, storage, sale and consumption of alcoholic beverages. The legislation has been in force since 1 May 1960 when Bombay State was bifurcated into the states of Maharashtra and Gujarat. Bombay Prohibition Act, 1949 is still in force in Gujarat state, however there is licensing regime in Maharashtra with granting licenses to vendors and traders. Gujarat is the only Indian state with a death penalty for the manufacture and sale of homemade liquor that results in fatalities. The legislation is titled the Bombay Prohibition (Gujarat Amendment) Act, 2009. The legislation was prompted by numerous deaths resulting from the consumption of methyl alcohol.

Predictably, smuggling and illicit sale of alcohol are very common. "Folder" is a slang term of unknown origin, used in Gujarat to refer to a bootlegger who delivers alcohol on-demand.

==== Permits ====
Foreigners and visitors from other parts of India can apply online for a permit. There are 35 stores across the state including nine in Ahmedabad that sell liquor on production of a physical copy of the permit. Once the permit expires, users are to hand over the unconsumed liquor to the district collector.

==== Public Interest Litigation ====
Five petitions, including Public Interest Litigation (PIL), have been filed before the Gujarat High Court challenging the prohibition law in the state. Most petitioners have raised concern that prohibition law violates Right to Privacy and are seeking relaxation on consumption in privacy.

==== Liquor Policy in GIFT City, Gujarat ====
In December 2023, Gujarat permitted controlled liquor consumption within Gujarat International Finance Tec-City (GIFT City), exclusively for its permanent employees and authorized visitors.

=== Mizoram ===
The Mizoram Liquor Total Prohibition Act, 1995 banned sale and consumption of alcohol effective from 20 February 1997. In 2007, the MLTP Act was amended to allow wine to be made from guavas and grapes, but with restrictions on the alcohol content and the volume possessed. It is illegal to transport these products out of the state.

Mizoram repealed prohibition on 10 July 2014, a period of 17 years after it had been imposed. On that date, the state Legislative Assembly passed the Mizoram Liquor (Prohibition and Control) Act, 2014 (MLPC Act), replacing the MLTP Act. The Presbyterian Church had organised mass prayers in all member churches across the state twice that year opposing the repeal of prohibition.

The Mizoram Liquor (Prohibition and Control) Act, 2014 was repealed on 20 March 2019 with the Mizoram Liquor Prohibition Act, 2019, it was a legislation promised by the Mizo National Front. The act came into effect in May 2019. In August 2022, the state government allowed sale of wine made from locally grown grapes.

=== Nagaland ===
The Nagaland Liquor Total Prohibition Act, 1989 (NLTP Act) banned the sale and consumption of alcohol in 1989. Enforcement of the ban is lax and Indian Made Foreign Liquor is readily available. Authorities generally turn a blind eye towards illegal sales. Reports have stated that some police officials themselves engage in bootlegging. The Congress party has termed prohibition a "total failure" and has pleaded for it to be revoked.

The excise department had earned around ₹600 lakh (equivalent to ₹64 crore or US$6.9 million in 2026) prior to prohibition. It earned about ₹10 lakh (US$11,000) annually in NLTP Act related fines as of June 2014. The Morung Express estimated that were about 500 illegal liquor bars in Dimapur, the largest city in the state, as of August 2014. Alcohol is also smuggled in from neighbouring Assam.

=== Madhya Pradesh ===
In April 2025, alcohol prohibition was imposed by the state government in nineteen religious places, namely the urban areas of Ujjain, Mandhata, Maheshwar, Mandleshwar, Orchha, Maihar, Chitrakoot, Datia, Panna, Mandla, Multai, Mandsaur and in gram panchayat areas of Salkanpur, Kundalpur, Bandakpur, Barman Kalan, Barman Khurd and Linga.

== States no longer practicing prohibition ==
Andhra Pradesh, Haryana, Kerala, Manipur, Mizoram and Tamil Nadu have previously enforced, but later repealed prohibition.

=== Andhra Pradesh ===
The total prohibition was introduced in Madras State (which included Coastal Andhra and Rayalaseema) when C. Rajagopalachari became Chief Minister in 1952. The ban was re-introduced by N. T. Rama Rao in 1994. N. Chandrababu Naidu repealed the prohibition in 1997, claiming that it was "not successful or feasible because of the leakages within the state and from across the borders".

=== Haryana ===
Bansi Lal led Haryana Vikas Party lifted prohibition on 1 April 1998. The total prohibition was in force in the state from July 1996.

=== Kerala ===
Kerala currently allows alcohol to be served in most hotels, bars and airports. The state banned arrack in 1996 (AK Antony government), 18 years later, a ban imposed by the United Democratic Front government in 2014 was reversed by the Left Democratic Front government in 2017 when they came to power citing heavy losses in state revenue and sharp decrease in tourism industry.

On 24 August 2014, Chief Minister Oommen Chandy announced that Kerala would implement prohibition in a phased manner. The decision was a result of factional conflict within the UDF, led by KPCC President V. M. Sudheeran. The decision was supported by the Catholic Church, Indian Union Muslim League (IUML) and the Kerala Congress. Liquor bars in Kerala are required to renew their licenses every year. The state government did not license any bars on 31 March 2014, resulting in the closure of 418 bars. The state government also declared its intention not to renew the licenses of the remaining 313 bars in the state. The state owned Kerala State Beverages Corporation (Bevco) had 338 shops, and Bevco would shut down 10% of them every year. Consumerfed, which has 46 shops, would also be closed. However, sale of alcohol would continue to be permitted in 5-star hotels, and there were fourteen 5-star hotels in the state as of August 2014. Toddy would also continue to be legally sold, and toddy shops would be permitted to operate as before. The state incurred heavy losses due to its tourism-based economy being severely affected by prohibition.

However, after the 2016 Elections where the UDF was defeated by the LDF, the newly elected Chief Minister, Pinarayi Vijayan, reversed the policy of prohibition. The Chief Minister stated that the state's policy would move from prohibition to regulation. In June 2017 the ban was revoked, allowing three star hotels and above to openly serve alcohol to its customers. The restrictions on bars were also eased with bars being allowed to remain open till 2300 instead of previous 2200 with new bars being allowed to apply for license. Airport lounges were also allowed to start serving alcohol again.

=== Lakshadweep ===
Lakshadweep, since 2021 no longer prohibits consumption of alcohol. Earlier it was the only union territory that banned the sale and consumption of alcohol. Consumption was permitted only on the island of Bangaram. Bangaram is an uninhabited island, but the Bangaram Island Resort has a bar.

=== Manipur ===
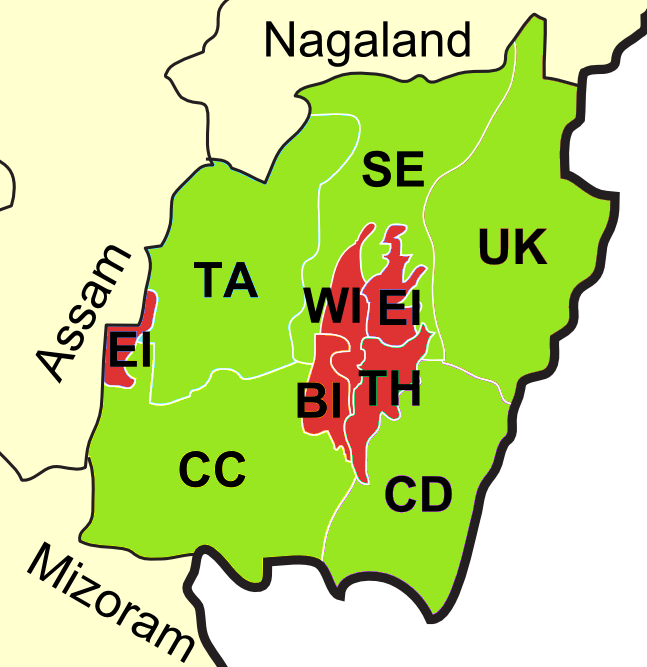
Prohibition in force in districts shown in red, repealed in green.

Prohibition is enforced in the Imphal East, Imphal West, Thoubal and Bishnupur districts of Manipur. Prohibition was enforced statewide by the Raj Kumar Ranbir Singh government with effect from 1 April 1991. Local brews called ashaba and atingba are available in most areas, and authorities usually ignore their sale and consumption.

In 2002, the Okram Ibobi Singh government lifted prohibition in the five hill districts of Manipur. The state Legislative Assembly passed the Manipur Liquor Prohibition (Amendment) Act, 2002 on 31 July 2002 lifting prohibition in the districts of Chandel, Churachandpur, Senapati, Tamenglong and Ukhrul. In 2015, Chief Minister Okram Ibobi Singh stated in the Manipur state assembly that the state government was looking at the option of lifting prohibition in the state, but liquor ban still continued in the state.

In December 2023, the Bharatiya Janata Party (BJP) government in the state has decided to lift the liquor ban after over 30 years.

=== Tamil Nadu ===
The total prohibition was introduced in Madras State when C. Rajagopalachari became Chief Minister in 1952. the DMK government led by M. Karunanidhi suspended it on 30 August 1971 and allowed the sale of arrack and toddy. In 1983, after the serial introduction of prohibition of the state-owned liquor distribution company TASMAC, it was introduced by the then Chief Minister M. G. Ramachandran. The TASMAC has a monopoly over wholesale and retail vending of alcoholic beverages. Since then, various prohibitions were installed in form of reduction of TASMAC shops, however, the alcohol selling is still legal.

== Social and economic effects ==
Prohibition, in the states of India that have implemented the policy, has led to lower rates of drinking among men, as well as a decreased incidence of violence against women.

It also led to many incidences of illegal production of liquor which often results in death due to methanol contamination, the latest example being the 2022 Gujarat toxic liquor deaths.

=== Bihar ===
Within a year of prohibition, the number of murders and gang robberies decreased by 20%. The number of riots fell by 13% and traffic accidents were reduced by 10%. Spending per household rose: milk sales increased by 10%, cheese by 200%, two-wheeled vehicles by 30%, and electrical appliances by 50%. In villages, brick houses are gradually taking the place of more rudimentary cottages since state prohibition came into effect. At the same time, substance abuse has increased significantly due to liquor being hard to access.

According to National Family Health Survey (NFHS), men aged 15-49 who drink alcohol in Bihar has decreased 11.9% (from 28.9% in 2015–16 to 17% in 2019–21), while the national share decreased only 6.8% (from 29.2% in 2015–16 to 22.4% in 2019–21).

Spousal violence against women aged 15–49 by men who drink alcohol decreased by 8.1 percentage points in Bihar (from 21.6% in 2015–16 to 13.5% in 2019–21), while the national share decreased by only 2.7 points (from 14.5% in 2015–16 to 11.8% in 2019–21), according to the NFHS. But, spousal violence by men who do not drink alcohol increased by 5.5 percentage points in Bihar (from 21.4% in 2015–16 to 26.9% in 2019–21), while the national share increased by 0.2 points (from 15.4% in 2015–16 to 15.6% in 2019–21), indicating that though a major factor, alcohol consumption is not the only one contributing to spousal violence against women.

== Dry days ==
Dry Days in India are specific days when the sale of alcohol is prohibited in the states which otherwise allow sale and consumption of alcohol. Dry Days are fixed by the respective state government. Most Indian states observe dry days on major religious festivals/occasions depending on the popularity of the festival in that region. National holidays such as Republic Day (26 January), Independence Day (15 August) and Gandhi Jayanti (2 October) are usually dry days throughout India. Dry days also depend on the establishment selling alcohol. For example, generally 5-star hotels do not have to observe all the dry days that liquor stores and small bars may have to. Dry days are also observed on and around voting days. National dry days also occur during Election Commission of India-ordained voting and result days.

== See also ==
- India alcohol related
  - Alcohol laws of India
  - Dry Days in India
  - Kasauli Brewery, India's first European style brewery still in operation
- Alcoholic Indian beverages
  - List of vedic and ayurvedic alcoholic drinks
  - Beer in India
  - Desi daru
  - Indian-made foreign liquor
  - Indian whisky
  - Lion Beer, Asia's first beer brand
  - Solan No. 1, India's first malt whisky
  - Old Monk, iconic Indian rum
  - Sura
- Dance bar
