= 2022 Gujarat alcohol poisoning =

Mass poisoning in Gujarat, India

- Venue: Villages in Botad district and surrounding districts in Gujarat
- Cause: Methanol poisoning from boot legging
- Deaths: 42
- Injuries: 97
- Arrests: 15
- Suspects: 20

On 25 July 2022, at least 42 people died and more than 97 were hospitalized in a methanol poisoning incident in Gujarat, India. The victims had consumed undiluted methyl alcohol (methanol), assuming it to be alcohol. The spurious liquor was then sold to more than 100 people in the villages of Ahmedabad, Botad and Surendranagar.

The Gujarat government said that the deaths were caused by "chemical poisoning" caused by 98.71% to 98.99% methanol, illegally sourced from an employee of a chemical packaging company, who sold it to bootleggers from different villages in the Botad district. An investigation is ongoing and fifteen people have been arrested by the police in the incident. Police have said they have recovered 475 litres of the liquid.

== Background ==
Sale and consumption of alcohol is illegal in four states including Gujarat. According to the World Bank 22.5% of 1.3 billion Indians live below the poverty line. Illicit alcohol is brewed in villages and then smuggled to the cities for sale at cost of ₹8 (8.3¢ US), one third of the cost of legally brewed liquor.

Alcohol is prohibited in Gujarat. Illegal manufacture and sale of toxic alcohol is punishable by death under Bombay Prohibition (Gujarat Amendment) Act, 2009. The law was made after 2009 Gujarat alcohol poisonings in which more than 136 people had died.

Illicit spurious liquor known locally as "lattha", is popular in rural Gujarat. According to the local politicians, the prohibition on the sale of alcohol is not enforced strictly and bootlegging of liquor is rampant across the state, due to the nexus between the bootleggers and the local police under the patronage of the ruling Bharatiya Janata Party in the state. Local politicians have complained to the authorities several times about the widespread sale of liquor in the village. Legal action was sought against the bootleggers. The police was accused by the local politicians of inaction due to rampant corruption and bribery received from the local bootleggers.

In Chokdi, the locals alleged that the police checked the places where alcohol was brewed twice a day, but just took regular bribes and let the production continue, even though prohibition was in force in Gujarat.

The newly appointed Barwala sub-inspector B.G. Vala halted the illegal liquor trade in Chokdi, within 15 days preceding the toxic liquor deaths. This forced the 20-30 families that relied on the alcohol trade for survival to use more dangerous methods to get it. However, after the case, Vala and other 5 policemen were transferred for alleged dereliction of duty.

== Incident ==
On 25 July 2022, bootleggers from Rojid, Ranpari, Chandarva, Devgana, Chokdi and a few other villages in Botad district had made the spurious liquor with methyl alcohol (methanol), a highly poisonous chemical. The liquor was sold to the villagers for ₹20 (21¢ US) per packet. The Police said that the victims from Ahmedabad in Gujarat state had consumed undiluted methanol, assuming it to be alcohol.

The incident came to be known on early morning of 26 July, when some of the residents of Rojid village of Barvala taluka and surrounding villages became sick and their condition started deteriorating. They were referred to the government hospitals in Barvala and Botad towns for treatment.

On 26 July 2022, the Gujarat government said that the deaths were caused by "chemical poisoning". It mentioned that the analysis of the substance consumed by the victims had been done at Forensic Science Laboratory (FSL) Gandhinagar. The tests showed the presence of 98.71% to 98.99% methyl alcohol. The methanol was illegally sourced from an employee of a chemical packaging company.

== Victims ==
The police said that spurious liquor, known locally as "lattha", was sold to more than 100 people in the villages of Ahmedabad, Botad and Surendranagar. 51 victims were admitted in the hospitals of Ahmedabad and Bhavnagar. Several people from villages of Ahmedabad district had arrived to Botad to consume the cheap liquor.

Rojid village, the epicentre of the tragedy had reported 11 deaths. Since noon of 25 July, the affected villagers had lost their eyesight and were vomiting blood.

By 27 July, the number of dead had increased to 42 people with more than 97 hospitalized. The authorities had asked the affected people to not fear prosecution and come forward to seek immediate medical assistance for treatment of methanol poisoning.

The police said that the actual death toll in the incident would be much more than the reported toll, since many victims died without getting any medical assistance. In one incident 25-year-old man named Bhavesh Chavda was taken to hospital, when his conditioned worsened. He died before he could be admitted into the hospital. The family took his body back home without getting an autopsy conducted and buried him according to the final rites. The FSL team later arrived, exhumed the body and conducted an autopsy before handing the body back to the family.

== Investigation ==
Three First Information Report (FIR)s were lodged in the police stations of Barwala and Ranpur in Botad district against 20 people under multiple sections of the Indian Penal Code (IPC) and the Gujarat Prohibition Act. The police report said that a bootlegger in Rojid village had told the police that she had purchased 20 litres of methanol for ₹2,000 (US$21). Police had said that they have seized 475 litres of the chemical and arrested 15 people in the incident. Six people were arrested by the police in the incident.

The Home Department of the Government of Gujarat had formed a three-member committee, headed by a senior police officer of the rank of deputy superintendent of police to inquire into the incident and submit a report within three days. Gujarat Anti-Terrorist Squad (ATS) and the Ahmedabad crime branch of Gujarat Police have joined the investigation.

== Aftermath ==
After the incident, the alcohol and drug consumption became a major issue in the 2022 Gujarat Legislative Assembly election. Aam Aadmi Party (AAP) Gujarat president Gopal Italia demanded an investigation by Central Bureau of Investigation (CBI) in the incident. The Indian National Congress demanded a probe by the sitting HC judge in the illegal liquor trade in Gujarat. Rahul Gandhi, former president of the Congress party publicly asked, which "ruling forces" are "giving protection to these mafia". Congress leaders urged Prime Minister Narendra Modi to speak up on the toxic liquor deaths and meet the bereaved families.

== See also ==
- 2009 Gujarat alcohol poisonings
- Prohibition in Gujarat
- Laththa Commission
- List of alcohol poisonings in India
