= Gujarat alcohol poisonings =

Gujarat alcohol poisonings may refer to

- 2009 Gujarat alcohol poisonings
- 2022 Gujarat toxic liquor deaths
