= IMCL =

IMCL may refer to:

- Indian Made Country Liquor or Desi daru
- ImClone Systems
