= Telangana State Beverages Corporation =

TSBCL
- Type: Public sector corporation
- Industry: Retail and Wholesale alcohol (IMFL) vending
- Founded: 3.6.2014
- Headquarters: Hyderabad, Telangana
- Area served: Telangana
- Key people: Ahmed Nadeem, IAS

Telangana State Beverages Corporation Ltd (TSBCL) is a public sector company owned by the government of Telangana, which has a monopoly over wholesale and retail vending of alcohol in Telangana. It controls the retail sale of Indian Made Foreign Liquor (IMFL) and beer trade in the state.

== History ==
Telangana State Beverages Corporation Ltd was constituted on 2 June 2014 under the Companies Act, 1956.
