= Temperance movement in India =

Social movement in India

The temperance movement in India aims at curbing the use of alcohol in that country. In some places, the temperance movement has led to alcohol prohibition in India, with many temperance organisations continuing their work today.

== History ==
In the 19th and 20th centuries, the temperance movement in India was well connected with the Temperance movement in Great Britain and the missionary movements of the United States. The World Woman's Christian Temperance Union (WWCTU) began organizing local unions there as early as August of 1887 with the arrival of Mary Greenleaf Clement Leavitt who toured the country for nearly a year, leaving Mrs. M.D. MacDonald (a Scottish Presbyterian missionary) as the provisional national president. When Pandita Ramabai opened her school for young Hindu widows in Mumbai in the spring of 1889, the WWCTU supported her work and commissioned her as a WCTU National Lecturer. In August 1893, the WCTU of India was officially organized and based in Lucknow with Jeannette Hauser appointed in a paid position as president.

In 1907, Sir Bhalchandra Kishna, the president of the Bombay Temperance Council, said that the cause of temperance as one that would unite people from all castes and religions.

The Punjab Legislative Assembly enacted pro-temperance legislation in 1919.

In June 1919, the South Indian Missionary Association, a Christian association, adopted a resolution supporting the efforts of Hindu and Muslim reformers pushing for the government to impose complete prohibition in India.

In 1921, William E. Johnson toured India for the Anglo-Indian Temperance Society and the World League Against Alcoholism, giving temperance speeches that were popular among crowds.

The Woman's Christian Temperance Union (WCTU) became established in India, printing the Indian Temperance News and White Ribbon. It aided Indians, both Christian and non-Christian, in fighting against alcohol. J.H. Chitamber, the wife of India's first bishop of the Methodist Episcopal Church, served as the president of the WCTU during this time.

The temperance movement in India became closely tied with the Indian independence movement as Mahatma Gandhi viewed alcohol as being a foreign importation. He viewed foreign rule as the reason that national prohibition was not yet established at his time. Starting in 1914, Indians peacefully picketed saloons under Gandhi's direction, which resulted in decreased alcohol consumption among Indians.

Upon India's independence in 1947, several states implemented prohibition, with some, such as Gujarat introducing it later.

In 2016, many women blamed in the state of Tamil Nadu alcohol for societal ills, such as domestic violence, and thus took to the polls to elect a pro-prohibition leader. Their effort succeeded and when former Chief Minister J Jayalalithaa was voted in, she shutdown five hundred liquor shops on her first day in office. In 2017, women agitated for temperance and the prohibition of alcohol in the state of Bihar; they campaigned for the election of Nitish Kumar, who upon the request of women, pledged that he would prohibit alcohol. Since signing prohibition legislation, "Murders and gang robberies are down almost 20 percent from a year earlier, and riots by 13 percent. Fatal traffic accidents fell by 10 percent."

Temperance organisations, such as AMADA and the WCTU, continue their work in India, focusing on anti-alcohol legislation and health education.

== See also ==
- Alcohol laws of India
- Alcohol prohibition in India
- Drug policy of India
