= Mohan Meakin =

Food and drink company in Uttar Pradesh, India

- Company type: Public limited
- Traded as: BSE: 590039
- Industry: Beverages, food processing,
- Founded: 1855 (Kasauli)
- Headquarters: Ghaziabad, Uttar Pradesh, India
- Key people: Hemant Mohan
- Products: Alcoholic beverages, non-alcoholic beverages, vinegars, cereals, glass bottles, malt extract
- Website: Mohan Meakin Limited

Mohan Meakin is a food and beverage conglomerate which started from Asia's first brewery incorporated in 1855 by Edward Dyer in Kasauli under the name Dyer Breweries Ltd. which also owns the Kasauli Brewery (India's first European style brewery still in operation) and Solan brewery and still produces the Lion beer (Asia's first beer brand), Solan No. 1, Old Monk rum, and Golden Eagle Whisky.

== History ==
In the late 1840s, Edward Dyer moved back to India from England to set up a brewery in India (later incorporated as Dyer Breweries in 1855) at Kasauli in the Himalayas. The Kasauli brewery launched India's and indeed Asia's first beer, Lion, which was in great demand by the British administrators and troops stationed in the heat of India. Lion was much appreciated as a beer, and one famous poster featured a satisfied British Tommy declaring, "as good as back home!"

The brewery was soon moved to nearby Solan, close to the British summer capital Shimla, as there was an abundant supply of fresh springwater there. The Kasauli brewery site was converted to a distillery, which Mohan Meakin Ltd. still operates. Dyer set up more breweries at Shimla, Murree (Murree Brewery), Rawalpindi, Mandalay and Quetta and acquired interests in the Ootacamund Brewery (South India).

Another entrepreneur, H. G. Meakin, moved to India and in 1887 bought the old Shimla and Solan Breweries from Edward Dyer and added more at Ranikhet, Dalhousie, Chakrata, Darjeeling, Kirkee and Nuwara Eliya (Sri Lanka, formerly Ceylon). After the First World War, the Meakin and Dyer breweries merged and, in 1937, when Burma was separated from India, the company was restructured with its Indian assets as Dyer Meakin Breweries, a public company on the London Stock Exchange.

Following independence, Narendra Nath Mohan raised funds and travelled to London, where he acquired a majority stake in Dyer Meakin Breweries. He took over management of the company in 1949 and built new breweries at Lucknow, Ghaziabad and Khopoli (near Mumbai) and the company name was changed to Mohan Meakin Breweries in 1967.

On the death of Mohan in 1969, his eldest son, V. R. Mohan, took over as managing director. He introduced a number of new products that are brand leaders today but died in 1973, soon after taking over. In the 1970s, the manufacturing activities of the company were diversified into other fields including breakfast cereals, fruit juices and mineral water under the leadership of Kapil Mohan (V. R. Mohan's brother). The word brewery was dropped from the company name in 1982 to remove the impression that the company was engaged only in beer making. New breweries were built during the 1970s and 1980s at Chandigarh, Madras, Nepal and Kakinada near Hyderabad.

Today, Mohan Meakin's principal brands are Old Monk Rum and Golden Eagle Beer. Its other products include Diplomat Deluxe, Colonel's Special, Black Knight, Meakin 10,000, Summer Hall and Solan No 1 whiskies, London Dry and Big Ben gins, and Kaplanski vodka. Asia's original beer, Lion, is still sold in northern India.

== Beer ==
Lion Beer is the main brand first sold by Dyer Breweries in the 1840s. Lion was originally an India Pale Ale (IPA) but the beer style was changed in the 1960s to a lager. Lion remained the number one beer in India for over a century from the 1840s until the 1960s. After this, another Mohan Meakin brand, Golden Eagle, took the number one place until the 1980s, when Kingfisher became number one. By 2001, Lion sales had declined substantially and Lion was only available to the Indian Army through the Canteen Stores Department. Mohan Meakin then entrusted the marketing of its original beer to Steven Judge, CEO of International Breweries The brand has since been relaunched in the north Indian market. With a new label design and marketing campaign, Lion has established itself once more in the civilian market and is now expanding into markets across India.

Lion earns a place in history as Asia's first beer brand. Lion's popularity with the British during the heyday of the empire led to the start-up of other Lion beers around the world, in New Zealand, South Africa and elsewhere. Lion remains the number-one brand in neighbouring Sri Lanka, where Mohan Meakin had introduced it in the 1880s through their Ceylon brewery.

Among their list of beers is Old Monk 1000, sporting the same logo as the Old Monk Rum considered as a strong beer with high alcohol content.

== Rum ==
Old Monk is a vatted Indian rum, blended and aged for 7 years (though there is also more expensive, 12-year-old version). It is dark, with an alcohol content of 42.8 (army issue alcohol content is 50%). It is produced by Mohan Meakin, based in Mohan Nagar, Ghaziabad, Uttar Pradesh.

It is available in all parts of India. Old Monk is also the third largest selling rum in the world. Old Monk has been the biggest Indian Made Foreign Liquor (IMFL) brand for many years. The first time it was tasted officially was 19 December 1954. It is sold in five size variants: 180 ml (quarter / nip), 350 ml (half / pint), 750 ml (full / quart), 1-litre and 2-litre bottles.

== See also ==
- Alcoholic Indian beverages
- Beer in India
- Indian-made foreign liquor
- Indian whisky
