= Beer in India =

Beer in India has been prepared from rice or millet for thousands of years. In the 18th century, the British introduced European beer to India. Beer is not as popular as stronger alcoholic beverages like desi daru and Indian-made foreign liquor, such as Indian whiskey. The most popular beers in India are strong beers.

Beer-like sura has been produced in India since the Vedic era (c. 1500–1200 BCE, Rig Veda), rice beer has been produced by the native tribes since ancient times, European beer imports to India from England started in 1716, introduced by the British Raj]. Lion beer, produced continuously since the 1820s, is Asia's first beer brand, and the first Indian brewed European style beer.

== History ==
=== Traditional beer ===
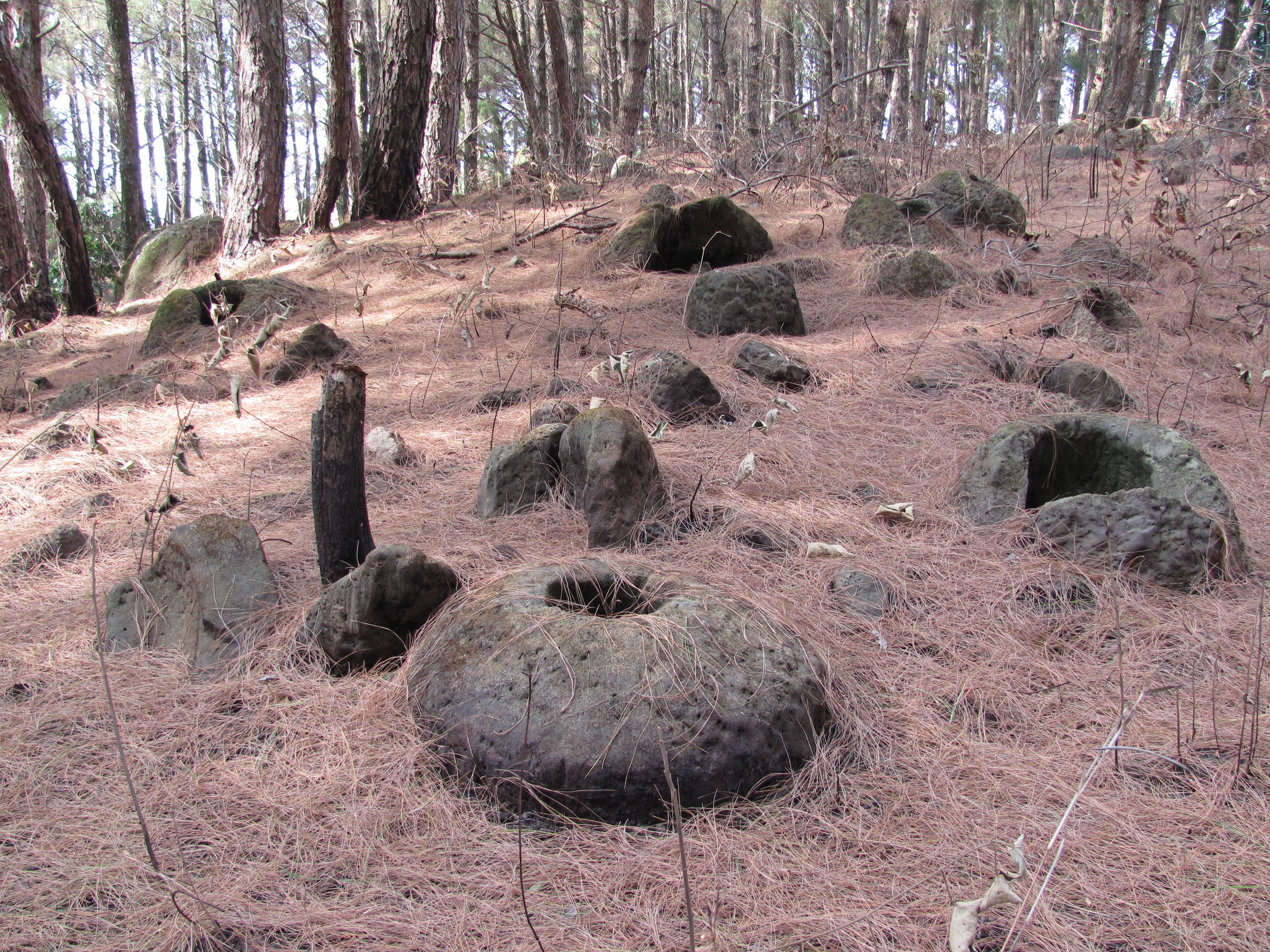
Traditional beer vats in Meghalaya.

The Vedas mention a beer-like drink called sura. It was the favourite of the god Indra. Sura is also mentioned in the Ramayana. Megasthenes has recorded usage of rice beer in India. Kautilya has also mentioned two intoxicating beverages made from rice called Medaka and Prasanna.

Rice beer or handia has been traditionally prepared by various indigenous tribes of India, in which Ruellia suffruticosa is sometimes added for flavor. Rice beer also has ceremonial use among the Asur people. Millet beer is also prepared by some tribes. According to biologist J. B. S. Haldane, local beer helped in keeping diseases like beri beri checked in these tribes. Recently, government and social workers have been trying to curb alcohol usage among these tribes. Elephant herds have been known to attack villages to drink this rice beer for which they have acquired a taste.

=== European beer ===
European-style beer was introduced in India by the British. By 1716, pale ale and Burton ale were being imported to India from England. To protect the beer from spoiling during the long journey, it had to have high alcohol content and hops were added to it. This led to the invention of India pale ale in about 1787 by Bow Brewery.

Edward Dyer, travelled to back India and set up India's first brewery, the Kasauli Brewery. It produced the beer brand Lion, which is still available. The beer production at Kasauli brewery was moved to Solan Brewery at Solan in a swap when Kasauli Brewery started producing India's first single malt whisky, the Solan No. 1. In 1855, it was incorporated as Dyer Breweries. Later, more breweries were built across India, Burma and Sri Lanka, and added to it. Later, H. G. Meakin bought the Solan brewery and added some more. It came to be known as Dyer-Meakin & Company. By the year 1882, there were 12 breweries in India in all, including one in Rangoon.

In the year 1892, 4,831,127 gallons of beer were produced in India. Out of this 2,748,365 gallons were purchased by commissariat and rest was left for consumption by the civilian population. But, British soldiers reportedly did not like local beer and preferred imported beer which they were able to acquire cheaply. In 1967 the price was only 6.5 rupees.

In 1937, Burma was separated from India and the company lost its Burmese assets. The company was restructured and renamed as Dyer Meakin Breweries. It was listed on the London Stock Exchange. In 1949, N. N Mohan acquired all the assets of Dyer Meakin Breweries and added a few more units. In 1967, the company was renamed to Mohan Meakin Breweries.

=== Modern ===
Established in 1969, Lilasons Breweries in Madhya Pradesh is known for their strong beer brand Khajuraho. It is considered the first super-strong beer brand in India. In recent years, foreign companies have been entering India and acquiring local businesses. In 1999, United Breweries floated a subsidiary called Millennium AlcoBev. It was a joint venture between United Breweries, UK-based Scottish & Newcastle and Ravi Jain. In 2000, SABMiller India entered Indian market by acquiring Narang Breweries. In June 2001, it acquired the Mysore Breweries. In 2003, SABMiller India acquired 50% stake in local Shaw Wallace's beer business. In November 2002, SABMiller India acquired Rochees Breweries.

In May 2005, SABMiller India acquired Shaw Wallace's beer assets for ₹600 crore. Also in 2005, Carlsberg entered India with its local venture, South Asian Breweries. Also in 2005, Singapore-based Asia Pacific Breweries acquired a 76% shared the local Aurangabad Breweries. In late 2005, UK-based Cobra Beer entered the Indian market by beginning negotiations with in December. In 2006, SABMiller India acquired Foster's Indian assets.

In February 2006, Anheuser-Busch Inbev, the makers of Budweiser, entered a partnership with Hyderabad-based Crown Beers. Also in 2006, Ravi Jain divested his holdings in Millennium AlcoBev. In 2010, United Breweries consolidate its assets, merging Millennium AlcoBev and other units back into itself. In 2011, United Breweries announced that they would produce the Heineken brand beer in India. In 2012 after India allowed foreign-direct investment from Pakistan, Murree Beer representatives stated that they were seeking to export their brand to India. The Rawalpindi-based Murree Beer, which was established in 1861, has been trying to enter the Indian market since 2003.

"Oktoberfest Goa", a beer, food and electronic music festival, has been held every year since 2011 in Goa.

The Competition Commission of India found United Breweries Limited (UBL), Anheuser Busch InBev India Ltd. (AB InBev) and Carlsberg India Private Limited (CIPL) guilty of price fixing and imposed fines in September 2021. UBL and CIPL were fined ₹750 crore (US$79 million) and ₹120 crore (US$13 million) respectively, while AB InBev was given a 100% benefit of reduction in penalty.

== Brands and breweries ==
The largest selling Indian beer brand is Kingfisher. Other major Indian brands are Hunter, Kalyani, Haywards, Knock Out and Zingaro. The largest brewery in India by market share is the Bangalore based United Breweries. Other major breweries in India are Carlsberg, SABMiller India, B9 Beverages (Bira 91) Som Distilleries and Breweries Ltd and Anheuser-Busch Inbev. In 2013, United Breweries had a market share of 55% and SABMiller India had a share of 23%. SABMiller India owns the Haywards brand, KALS breweries owns Foster's Indian units.

Although imported beer brands like, Corona, Singha, Tsingtao, Victoria Bitter, Geist and Christoffel, are available in India, they are costly due to high import duties reaching up to 100%. Carlsberg's Tuborg Booster Strong brand (8% ABV) and Anheuser-Busch Inbev's Budweiser Magnum (6.5% ABV) are sold only in India. United Breweries' Kingfisher Strong (8% ABV) is India's best selling brand.

Some of the major beer brands in India by market share are:

Popular beer brands by market share (2014)
Company	Market share (%)	Beer brand	Market share (%)
United Breweries	51.1	Kingfisher	41.2
United Breweries	51.1	Kalyani Black Label	2.7
United Breweries	51.1	UB Export	2
United Breweries	51.1	Sandpiper	1.5
United Breweries	51.1	Bullet Super Strong	1
United Breweries	51.1	Zingaro	0.9
United Breweries	51.1	London Pilsner	0.2
SABMiller	25.6	Haywards	15
SABMiller	25.6	Knockout	8.7
SABMiller	25.6	Foster's	1.3
SABMiller	25.6	Royal Challenge Premium Lager	0.6
Carlsberg	7.6	Okocim	5.1
Carlsberg	7.6	Tuborg	1.3
Carlsberg	7.6	Carlsberg	1.2
Mohan Meakin	3.1	Golden Eagle	1.7
Mohan Meakin	3.1	Black Knight	1.1
Mohan Meakin	3.1	Vorion	0.2
Anheuser-Busch	2.1	Budweiser	2
Molson Coors	0.2	Cobra	0.2

=== Craft beer ===
Modern craft beer came relatively late to India. The first Indian brewpubs opened in Pune (Doolally) and Gurgaon Ahirwal (Howzat) in 2009. Also around the same time, India's first bottled craft beers were launched by the Martin Judd's brewery in Maharashtra, and Australian owned "Little Devils" in Ghaziabad. While the bottling ventures proved short-lived, and closed down within a years time, brewpubs have since become a successful format and common sight, especially in India's large cities. In 2019, India counts more than 200 brewpubs, of which about 60 each are located in Bangalore and Gurgaon, respectively.

Bottled Indian craft beer became available again after a long break in 2016, when the White Rhino brewery opened in Gwalior, and soon after started selling their beers in Haryana and Delhi. Since then, new packaging craft breweries have opened in Bangalore and Goa.

Due to restrictive Indian liquor manufacturing laws, some entrepreneurs have chosen to manufacture their beer outside of India. Among them was Bira91, an Indian witbier brand, which became extremely popular across the country, and has since shifted its production back to India.

== Sales and consumption ==
In 2014-15 financial year, the beer market in India grew by 6% to 22.3 million hectolitres (or to 286 million cases). On the one hand, this rate is twice faster as compared to the 2013-14-year; on the other hand, it is half than the average rate over the preceding decade. The per capita consumption of beer is 1.6 litres. Due to the increase in disposable income and discerning consumers, the potential is high. The industry has been growing over the last few years and this growth is attributed to the growing middle class. The increased consumption has raised the price of barley in India.

Indians prefer stronger alcoholic drinks, like whiskey, over beer, because it is cheaper and has a higher alcohol content. Indians mostly consume stronger brews. Strong beer with alcohol content in the 5-8% range accounted for 83% of the total beer sales in 2012. Beer accounts for only 5% of the total alcohol consumed. The low consumption is attributed to high cost, availability and stringent regulations. Karnataka and Kerala are the only two state in India which has a lower tax rate for beer compared to other alcoholic beverages. Maharashtra has the highest tax on alcohol, at 43%. The latest entrant into the Indian market is the Bira 91 brand with its headquarters in Delhi, making a steady rise in the beer market.

Domestic-market beer is packaged in 650-ml bottles and come in cases of 6. Export-market beer come in 330-ml Standard European or 625-ml (22 imp. oz.) bottles. They come in mild (4% to 5% ABV) and strong (6% to 8% ABV) lagers.

== See also ==
- Beer related
  - Beer and breweries by region
  - Sura
  - Kasauli Brewery
  - Solan brewery
  - Lion beer, Asia's first beer brand
- Other India alcohol related
  - List of vedic and ayurvedic alcoholic drinks
  - Alcoholic Indian beverages
  - Alcohol laws of India
  - Alcohol prohibition in India
  - Dry Days in India
  - Desi daru
  - Indian-made foreign liquor
  - Indian whisky
  - Scotch whisky
