= Dry states =

Dry states may designate:

- Dry states, in the history of the United States of America, especially during the Prohibition from 1920 to 1933.
- Dry states in India, where alcohol drinking is prohibited (such as Mizoram or Nagaland).
