= Bombay Prohibition Act, 1949 =

Appeal

Bombay Prohibition Act 1949

Bombay Legislative Assembly
- Passed: 1949
- Status: In force

The Bombay Prohibition Act, 1949 is an Act of the Bombay Legislative Assembly relating to the promotion and enforcement of alcohol prohibition in the Bombay State. The Bombay state was divided into the states of Maharashtra and Gujarat in 1960.

Under the Act a permit is mandatory to purchase, possess, consume or serve liquor. The Act empowers the police to arrest a person for purchasing, consuming or serving alcohol without the permit with punishment ranging from three months to five years in prison. Transporting liquor without a permit is punishable with a fine of 50,000 rupees and 5 years in prison.

After independence the Government appointed Adv Mr J.S.Savant, Bombay as a Member of The Bombay Prohibition Committee. (Was the president of the Maratha Recruitment Board)

== Notable arrests ==
A documentary filmmaker Priti Chandriani was arrested in 2013 for possessing liquor for making liqueur chocolates at home.

== See also ==
- Bombay Prohibition (Gujarat Amendment) 2009
- Permit Raj
