= Desi daru =

Type of liquor

Desi daru देसी दारू
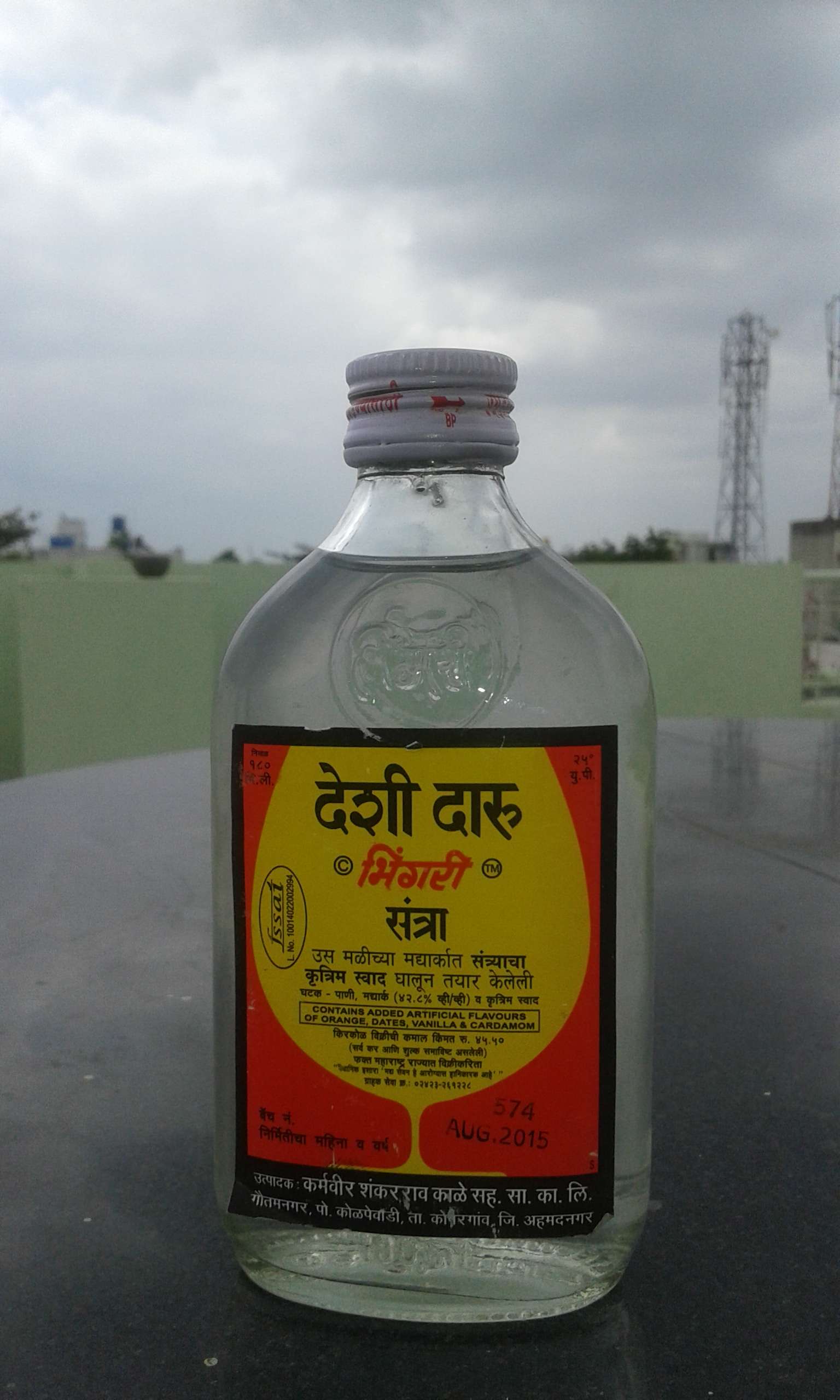
- Desi daru with Orange flavor
- Type: distilled spirit
- Origin: India
- Alcohol by volume: 28.5%–42.5%
- Proof (US): 50°
- Colour: White and Brown

Desi daru (Hindi: देसी दारू), also known as country liquor or Indian-made Indian liquor (IMIL), is a local category of liquor produced on the Indian subcontinent, as opposed to Indian-made foreign liquor. Due to cheap prices, country liquor is the most popular alcoholic beverage among the impoverished people. It is fermented and distilled from molasses, a by-product of sugarcane. Desi liquor is a broad term and it can include both legally and illegally made local alcohol. The term desi daru usually refers to legal alcohol while other types of country liquor (arrack and palm toddy) may be categorised as moonshine alcohol.

== Etymology ==
The term desi, a Hindustani term derived from Sanskrit desh (country or region), which is generally an endonym for the compatriot or local is often applied to food or drink that is considered traditional or native. Dārū (Hindi दारू and Urdu دارو) is a Persian-derived term mostly used for any alcoholic beverage in India. Śarāb (Hindi शराब and Urdu شراب) is another Arabic-derived equivalent and is used in some areas with somewhat less frequency.

== Industry ==
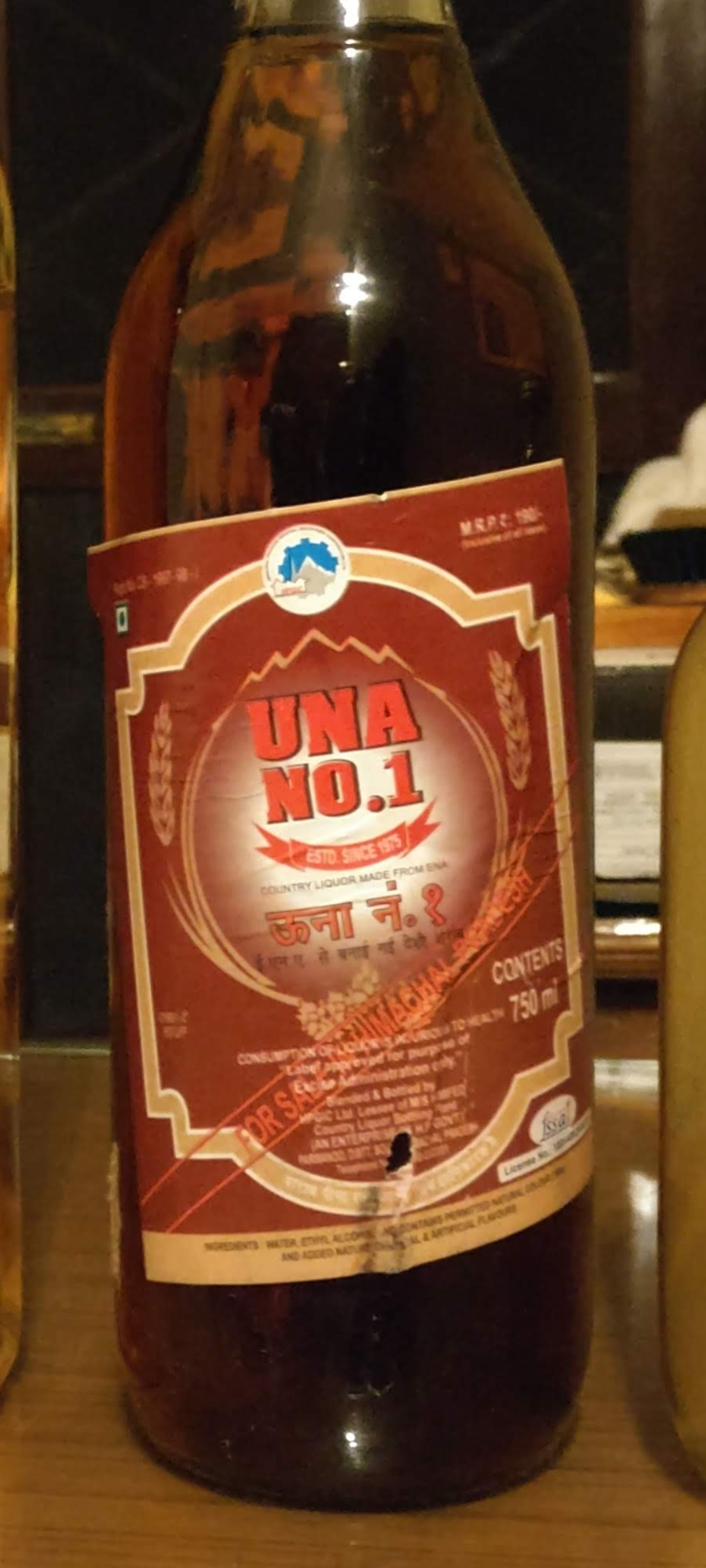
Una Brand Desi daru

An article in the medical journal The Lancet estimated that nearly two-thirds of the alcohol consumed in India is country liquor. Globus spirits mentioned that India's country liquor market is about 242 million cases (over 30% of the beverage industry in India) with a growth rate of about 7% per annum. No data regarding Pakistan is available as drinking alcohol is officially prohibited for Muslims in Pakistan, although locally made liquor is sold on the black market.

It remains one of the most widely consumed forms of alcohol in India particular among lower-income groups and its subject to separate state-level licensing from Indian made foreign liquor.

Government regulation provide for a separate licensing for production, distribution and retailing of country liquor (IMIL) as opposed to Indian-made foreign liquor.

== Social issues ==
Country liquor, being the cheapest alcohol in India, is the mainstay alcoholic beverage for the rural population and urban poor. In rural areas, illicit country liquor has been blamed for domestic violence and poverty in the family. There have been several protests against country liquor shops/bars in villages.

=== Adulteration ===
As country liquor is cheaper than other spirits, there have been reports of mixing country liquor with Scotch/English whisky in many bars in India to maximise the profit.

=== Harmful moonshine alcohol ===
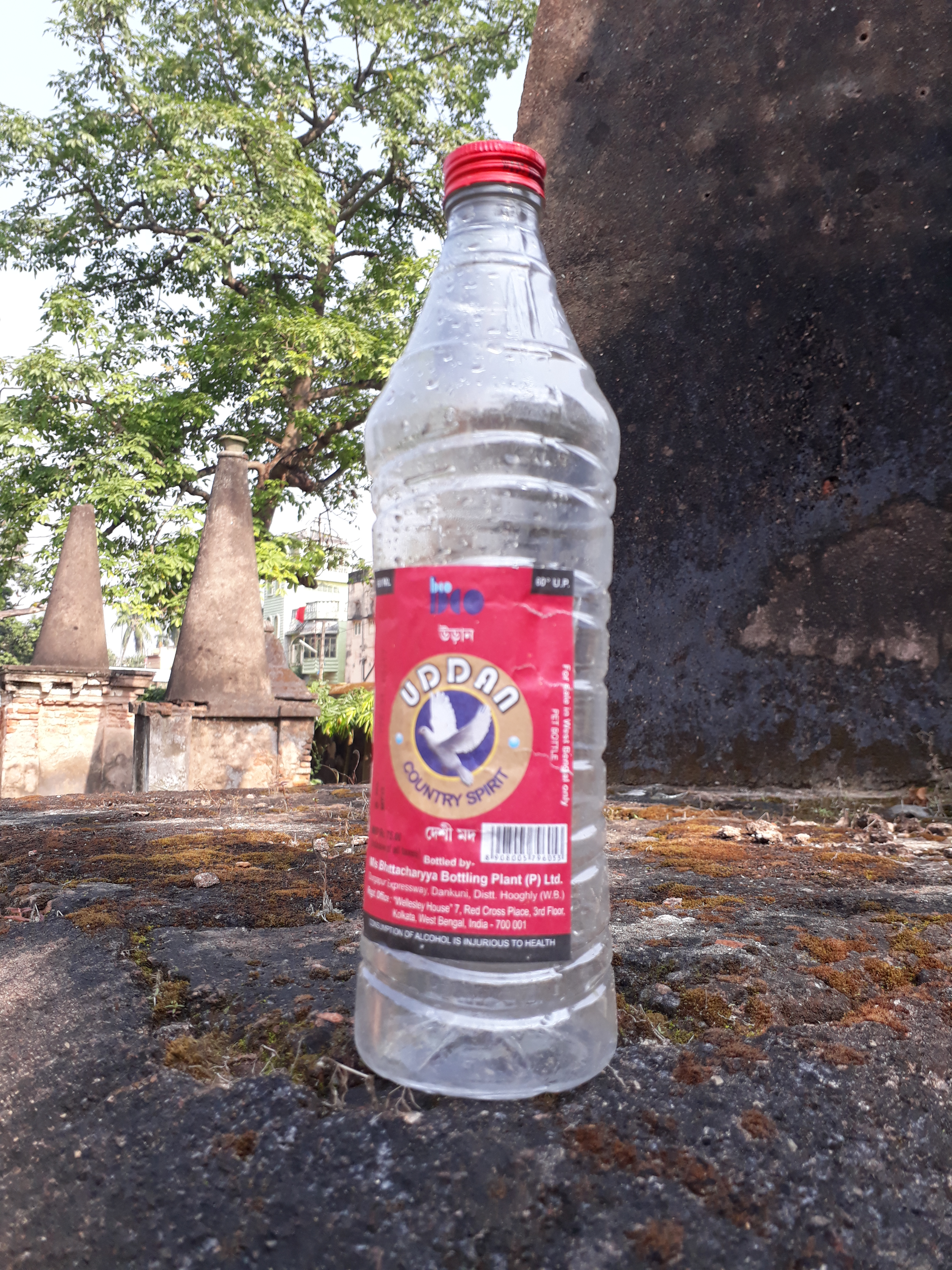
A bottle Indian country liquor

When moonshine desi daru is made illegally and if the distillation process and the proper equipment is not used, harmful impurities such as fusel alcohols, lead from plumbing solder, and methanol can be concentrated to toxic levels in the moonshine desi daru. Several deaths have been reported in India and Pakistan due to consumption of illegally-made toxic moonshine liquor.

== In popular culture ==
There are several references of desi daru in Bollywood films, songs.

- The 2012 film Cocktail has a song named Daru Desi sung by Benny Dayal and Shalmali Kholgade.
- The 2011 film F.A.L.T.U has a party song named Char Baj Gaye (Party Abhi Baaki Hai) with references to desi daru.
- Scenes in the 2011 film Rockstar shows lead actor Ranbir Kapoor and lead actress Nargis Fakhri drinking desi daru.
- The 2014 film Main Aur Mr. Riight has a song named Desi Daru sung by Jasbir Jassi.

== See also ==
- Alcoholic Indian beverages
  - List of vedic and ayurvedic alcoholic drinks
  - Beer in India
  - Indian-made foreign liquor
  - Indian whisky
  - Lion beer, Asia's first beer brand
  - Solan No. 1, India's first malt whisky
  - Old Monk, iconic Indian rum
  - Sura
- Other India alcohol related
  - Alcohol laws of India
  - Alcohol prohibition in India
  - Dry Days in India
