= Mizhuyeva =

Mizhuyeva Мижуева
- Village
- Location within Perm Krai Location within Russia
- Coordinates: 59°09′N 54°42′E
- Country: Russia
- Region: Perm Krai
- District: Kudymkarsky District
- Time zone: UTC+5:00

Mizhuyeva (Russian: Мижуева) is a rural locality (a village) in Yorgvinskoye Rural Settlement, Kudymkarsky District, Perm Krai, Russia. The population was 256 as of 2010. There are 12 streets.

An annual sur ale festival is held in Mizhuyeva.

== Geography ==
Mizhuyeva is located 20 km north of Kudymkar (the district's administrative centre) by road. Yermakova is the nearest rural locality.
