= Sur (Komi beverage) =

Alcoholic beverage

Sur is an alcoholic beverage similar to beer made by Komi people. From a technical standpoint, it is a weak top-fermented ale similar to Finnish sahti and raw ales that do not undergo wort boiling.

== History ==
The Komi inhabit northeastern European Russia, along with other Permians. The exact origin of sur is not known; people from the Ananyino culture could have been exposed to beer from contacts with Indo-Iranian peoples such as Scythians and Sarmatians, but, as nomads, they were unable to brew it themselves.

Brewing and consuming sur was an important part of many Komi celebrations such as the harvest festival Autumn Kuzminki, weddings and other major holidays. Komi-Zyryans had a dedicated beer festival called Medes (Медӧс, Komi pronunciation: [medəs]). Komi continued making homebrewed kvas, sur and boza-like beverage called yresh (ырӧш) until the end of the 20th century since many agricultural workers were paid in grain or flour.

Around the 1980s, store-bought beer and tea replaced traditional drinks, although the 2010s saw a revival of Komi beverages. A modern sur festival, "Bur sur" (Бур сур, lit. "good beer"), has been held annually since 2014 in Mizhuyeva village.

== Etymology ==
The word sur (сур, Komi pronunciation: [sur]) is shared between Komi-Zyryans, Komi-Permyaks and Udmurts. Etymologically, sur is a loanword from an Indo-Iranian language; cognate with Indian sura.

== Brewing ==
Traditional Komi sur is an ale made from malted rye (or, rarely, rye and barley). To make the wort, Komi used large wooden barrels with straw or spruce branches placed at the bottom as a filter to drain the wort through the low-placed bunghole, or drain hole. A key part of the wort-making process was carefully placing large, heated stones into the barrel after the malt and water, causing the liquid around the stones to boil and giving it a distinct sweet, smoky taste. After the wort cooled, brewers added yeast and a hop infusion before a 3-5 day fermentation in a cool, shaded area. Sur is a dense beverage with a slightly bitter taste and a "bready" flavor.

Unlike many other cultures that considered beer making women's work, Komi saw it as a sacred task reserved exclusively for ritually pure men. Women were not allowed to participate at any stage of its preparation; even going to the hop yard was strictly forbidden. The only exception to that rule happened when all men were away hunting: then women made sur for themselves.

Modern urban brewing technique introduced store-bought malt that is heated on a stove instead of an open fire; additionally, many modern recipes recommend adding herbs and berries to enhance the taste of sur. During the 20th century, most brewers of sur were female, although men sometimes took a leading role in brewing.

== In culture ==
Brewing sur is a common motif in Komi myths. In its most typical form, it goes as follows: a sorcerer or a healer is brewing sur on a riverbank; another person yells from a passing boat, in Russian: "Wort, stop!" and the wort stops brewing. The sorcerer yells back, also in Russian: "If the wort stops, the boat stops!" and keeps the boat frozen in place until the sorcerer cancels the spell. Analyzing the variants of this motif, Anatoly Panyukov comes to the conclusion that this myth represents a confrontation between a local protector and a foreign authority, and the Komi likely adopted it from the Russians.

== Links ==
- "Three thousand litres of sur, over 100 artists and a tour to a rye field: a report from Bur Sur // Три тысячи литров сура, больше 100 артистов и экскурсия на ржаное поле: как прошёл фестиваль «Бур Сур»". Сто лет Коми-Пермяцкому округу (in Russian). 4 August 2025.
