= Chokdi =

Village in Gujarat, India

Coordinates: 22.4802717°N 71.6019237°E

Chokdi is a village in Chuda Taluka, Surendranagar district, Gujarat, India. It is located five miles to the west of Chuda.

== Places of interest ==
It is famous for the shrine of the Charmalyo Nag and is one of the few shrines sacred to snake worship in the Saurashtra peninsula. The shrine is very popular, and the average income derived by the ministering priest is about Rs. 500 per annum in 1880s.

== Demographics ==
The population of Chokdi according to the census of 1872 was 1106 and according to that of 1881 1265 souls.
