= Gandhi Jayanti =

National festival celebrated in India

Gandhi's Jayanti
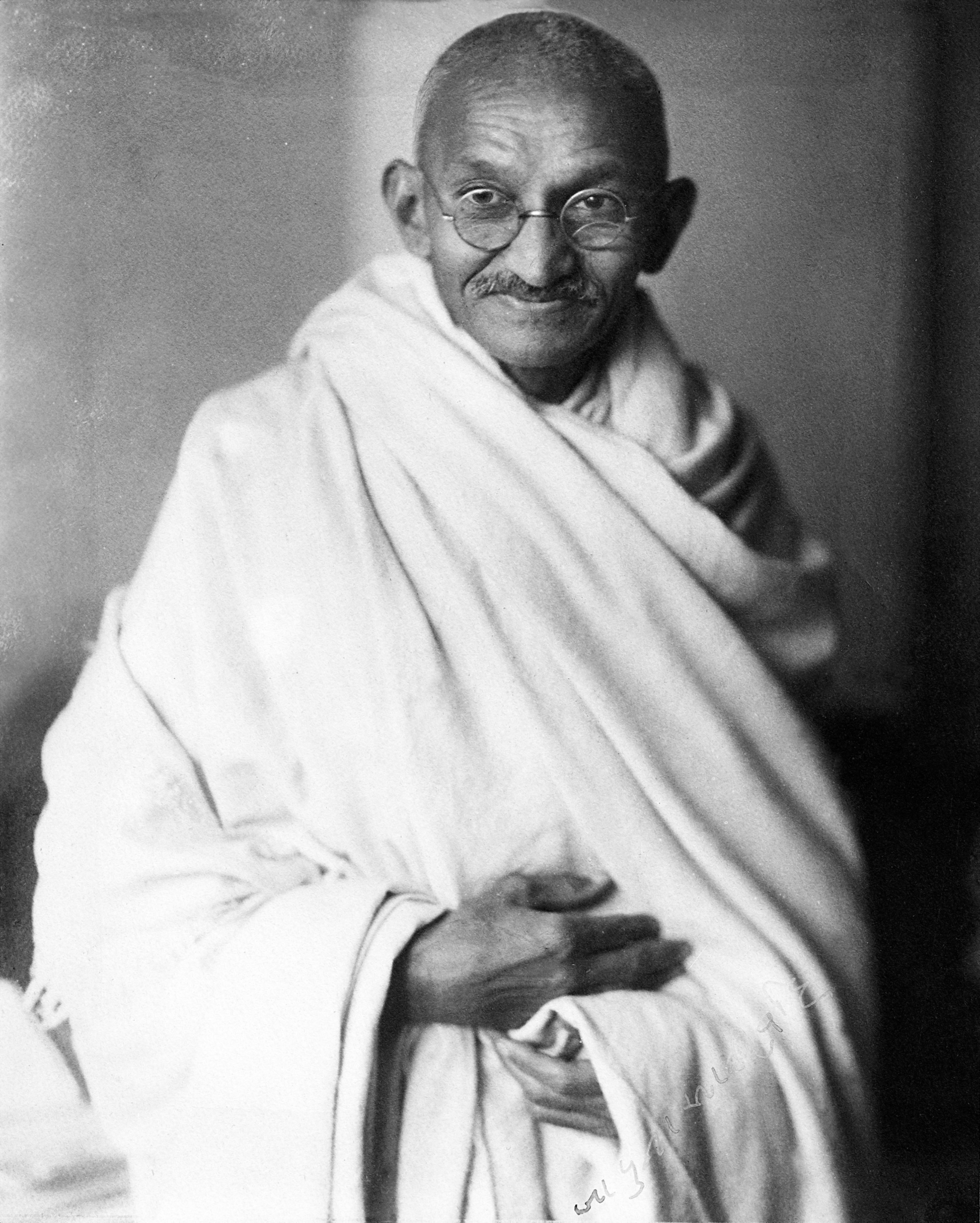
- Gandhi in 1931
- Observed by: India
- Type: National holidays in India
- Significance: Honours Mahatma Gandhi's role in Indian Independence
- Observances: Community, historical celebration
- Date: 2 October
- Next time: 2 October 2027
- Frequency: Annual
- Related to: International Day of Non-Violence; Republic Day; Independence Day

Gandhi Jayanti is a national holiday in India, celebrated annually on October 2 to honour the birthday of Mahatma Gandhi, one of the key leaders of the Indian independence movement, and a pioneer of nonviolence.

== Background ==
Gandhi Jayanti is one of the three national holidays in India (along with Independence Day and Republic Day). It celebrates Gandhi's role as "National Father" (defined by Subhas Chandra Bose), as his principles of nonviolent resistance played a crucial role in India's successful struggle for independence from British colonial rule. Since it is a national holiday, it is observed in all of India's states and territories.

In 2007, the United Nations General Assembly declared this day as the International Day of Non-Violence.

On the occasion of Gandhi Jayanti 2014, Prime Minister Narendra Modi started the Swachh Bharat Mission. Its second phase started on Gandhi Jayanti 2021.

== How it is observed ==
The holiday is marked by prayer services and tributes across India, including at Gandhi's memorial, Raj Ghat, in New Delhi where he was cremated. Popular activities include prayer meetings, commemorative ceremonies in different cities by colleges, local government institutions and socio-political institutions. Awards are granted for projects in schools and the community encouraging a nonviolent way of life as well as celebrating Gandhi's effort in the Indian independence movement. Gandhi's favourite bhajan (Hindu devotional song), "Raghupati Raghava Raja Ram", is usually sung in his memory. Statues of Mahatma Gandhi throughout the country are decorated with flowers and garlands, and some people avoid drinking alcohol or eating meat on the day. Public buildings, banks and post offices are closed.
