= Linga, Madhya Pradesh =

Coordinates: 22°15′27.15″N 81°0′53.09″E

Linga
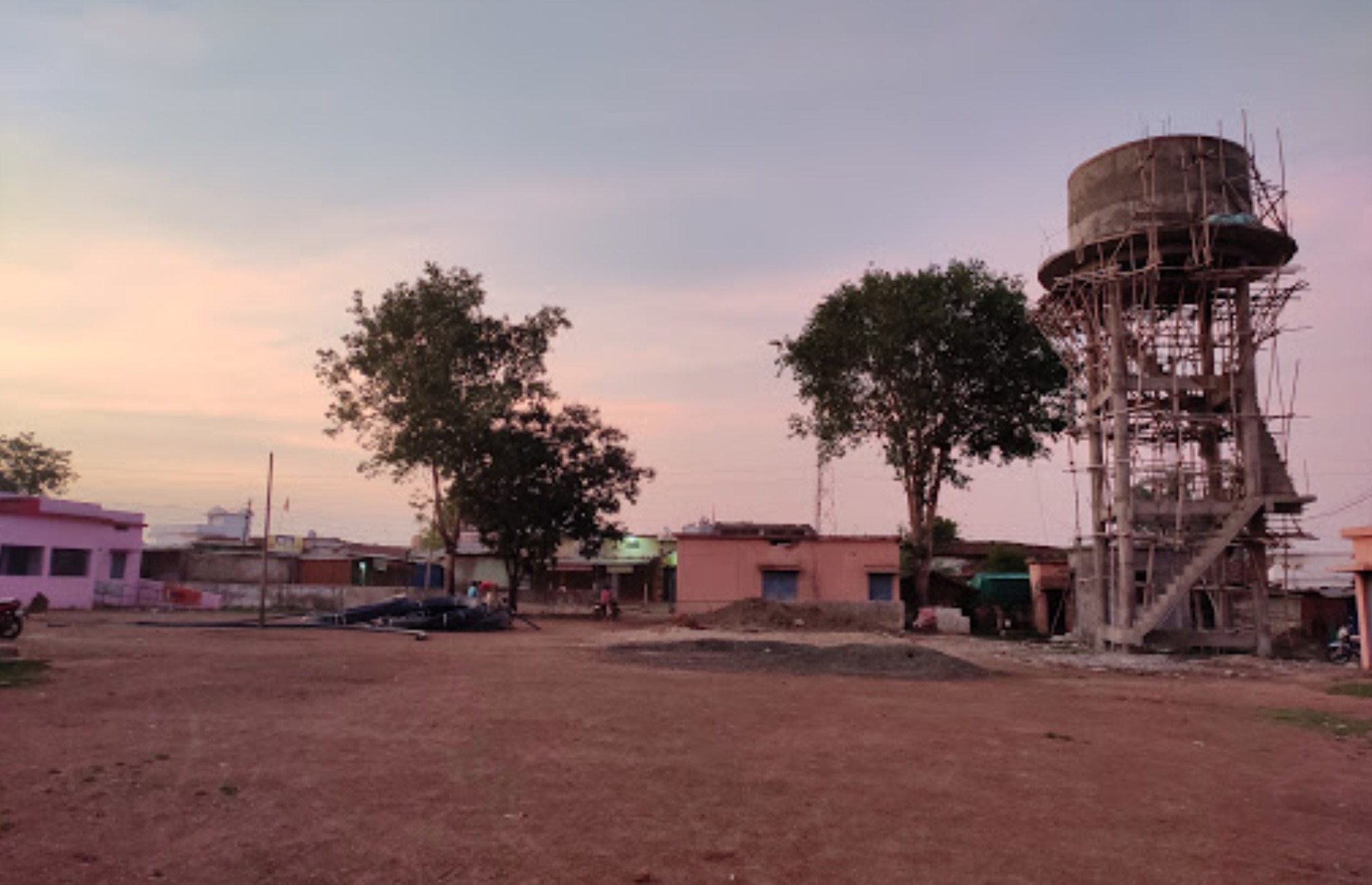
- View of the Linga water tower from the village's main road

- Location within India
- Country: India
- State: Madhya Pradesh
- District: Balaghat

Languages
- Time zone: UTC+5:30 (IST)

Linga is a village in Balaghat District, Jabalpur Division in the Indian state of Madhya Pradesh. It is located about 8 km from Balaghat and 391 km from Bhopal. Balaghat, Wara Seoni, Gondiya, are the nearby cities.

Linga is surrounded by Kirnapur tehsil to the South, Waraseoni tehsil to the west, Lalbarra tehsil to the west, and Khairlanji tehsil to the west.

The primary languages are Hindi and Marathi. The village is 309 meters above sea level.

== Transport ==
Linga is connected to Balaghat by road, by rail (Balaghat Junction Railway Station and Kanhadgaon Railway Station). Gondia, Jabalpur, Nagpur & Durg Railway Station are other major railway station near Linga.
