= Laththa Commission =

The Laththa Commission was a Commission of Inquiry appointed by the Government of Gujarat to probe the 2009 hooch tragedy that claimed 148 lives in Ahmedabad.

The deaths occurred due to the consumption of Laththa (spurious liquor which contains methanol). The commission recommended framing stringent rules for the transportation, possession & use of methyl alcohol and adopt measures to control pilferage of methyl alcohol in transit by introducing systems such as electronic locks.

== See also ==
- Bombay Prohibition (Gujarat Amendment) 2009
