= Indian-made foreign liquor =

Non-indigenous alcoholic beverages manufactured in India

Indian-made foreign liquor (IMFL) is the official term used by governments, businesses and media in India to refer to all types of liquor manufactured in the country other than indigenous alcoholic beverages such as feni, toddy, arrack and others.

And bottled in India (BII) is referred to spirits that are produced in foreign countries and imported to India in bulk quantities and bottled in an Excise Bonded Warehouse by the Importers.

== Manufacturing ==
When locally manufactured, the various types of IMFLs are supposed to be produced using their traditional methods, such as fermenting grain mash to produce whiskey. However, a common characteristic of many IMFLs, distinct from spirits elsewhere in the world, is that, irrespective of the final product, the starting ingredient is a neutral spirit distilled from molasses, a byproduct of the sugar industry. This neutral spirit at 96% alcohol by volume is first reduced to 42.8% using demineralised water, whereupon flavours and other spirits are added. Caramel colouring is added at this stage to impart colour to the spirit. Most commonly, grain or malt-based whisky, which may include imported Irish or Scotch whisky is blended with the spirit.

== See also ==
- List of vedic and ayurvedic alcoholic drinks
- Alcoholic Indian beverages
- Beer in India
- Desi daru
- Indian whisky
- Lion beer, Asia's first beer brand
- Solan No. 1, India's first malt whisky
- Old Monk, iconic Indian rum
- Sura

== Other India alcohol related ==
- Alcohol laws of India
- Alcohol prohibition in India
- Dry Days in India
- Kasauli Brewery, India's first European-style brewery still in operation
- Solan brewery
