= 2009 Gujarat alcohol poisonings =

Mass poisoning in Gujarat, India

The Gujarat alcohol poisonings occurred in July 2009 in Gujarat, resulting in the death of 136 people from consumption of bootleg liquor.

== Background ==
Gujarat had banned alcohol consumption since 1960 as a homage to Mohandas Karamchand Gandhi. However bootlegged alcohol, known as Hooch, is widely available, allegedly under the patronage of the local police. Gujarat has witnessed several occasions of alcohol poisoning, claiming the lives of more than 400 people after the ban was enforced. To counter the liquor mafia, the state government in 1996 formed the State Prohibition Department, which was dismantled in 2006 because of a shortage of police personnel. During the tenure of the department there were no incidents of alcohol poisoning in Gujarat. The revenue loss to Gujarat government because of the ban is estimated to be around Rs 30 Billion.

== Alcohol poisoning ==
On 7 July 2009, ten people died in Behrampura after drinking spurious liquor. The liquor was brewed in the house of Arvind Solanki, who also died after consuming the liquor. The death toll rose to 43 next day and crossed 120 by 12 July. Two hundred seventy-six people were admitted in various hospitals with nearly 100 of them in intensive care units. More than 1,000 litres of hooch containing methanol was brought to Ahmedabad from Mahemdavad.

== Reactions ==
After the incident, there had been demands for repealing the prohibition of alcohol in the state. Vijay Mallya, the chairman of United Breweries, criticised the Gujarat government. He claimed that: "Blanket prohibition has never worked in this free world". The state assembly also witnessed scenes of uproar and demands for the resignation of Narendra Modi, the chief minister of the state. The leader of the opposition of Gujarat Assembly, Shaktisinh Gohil, alleged that Rasik Paramar, a Bharatiya Janata Party (BJP) councillor in the area, was a key figure in the state's bootlegging network.

Following the tragedy, the police conducted more than 8,000 raids in the state, booking 6,713 persons for violation of prohibition On 14 July, the police announced that Vinod Chauhan, the prime accused had managed to slip out of Gujarat. The state government introduced a bill in the state Assembly to amend the Prohibition Law, calling for penal action up to the death penalty for those convicted in spurious liquor cases.

== See also ==
- Prohibition in Gujarat
- Laththa Commission
- Bombay Prohibition (Gujarat Amendment) 2009
- List of alcohol poisonings in India
