= Old Monk =

Indian dark rum

- Type: Rum
- Manufacturer: Mohan Meakin
- Origin: India
- Introduced: 1954
- Alcohol by volume: 42.8%
- Proof (US): 75° UK
- Colour: Brown, dark maroon, black
- Related products: Khukri Rum; McDowell's No.1 Celebration

Old Monk Rum is a vatted Indian dark rum, launched in 1954. It is a dark rum with a distinct vanilla flavour, with most expressions spiced, aged in oak barrels, and bottled at an alcohol content of 42.8% ABV (75° proof). It is produced in Ghaziabad, Uttar Pradesh, India and has a registered office in Solan, Himachal Pradesh.

The company conducts no advertising, and Old Monk's popularity depends on word of mouth and the loyalty of customers. Old Monk has been the biggest Indian Made Foreign Liquor (IMFL) brand for many years. However, in 2013 Old Monk lost its rank as the largest selling dark rum to McDowell's No.1 Celebration.

== History ==
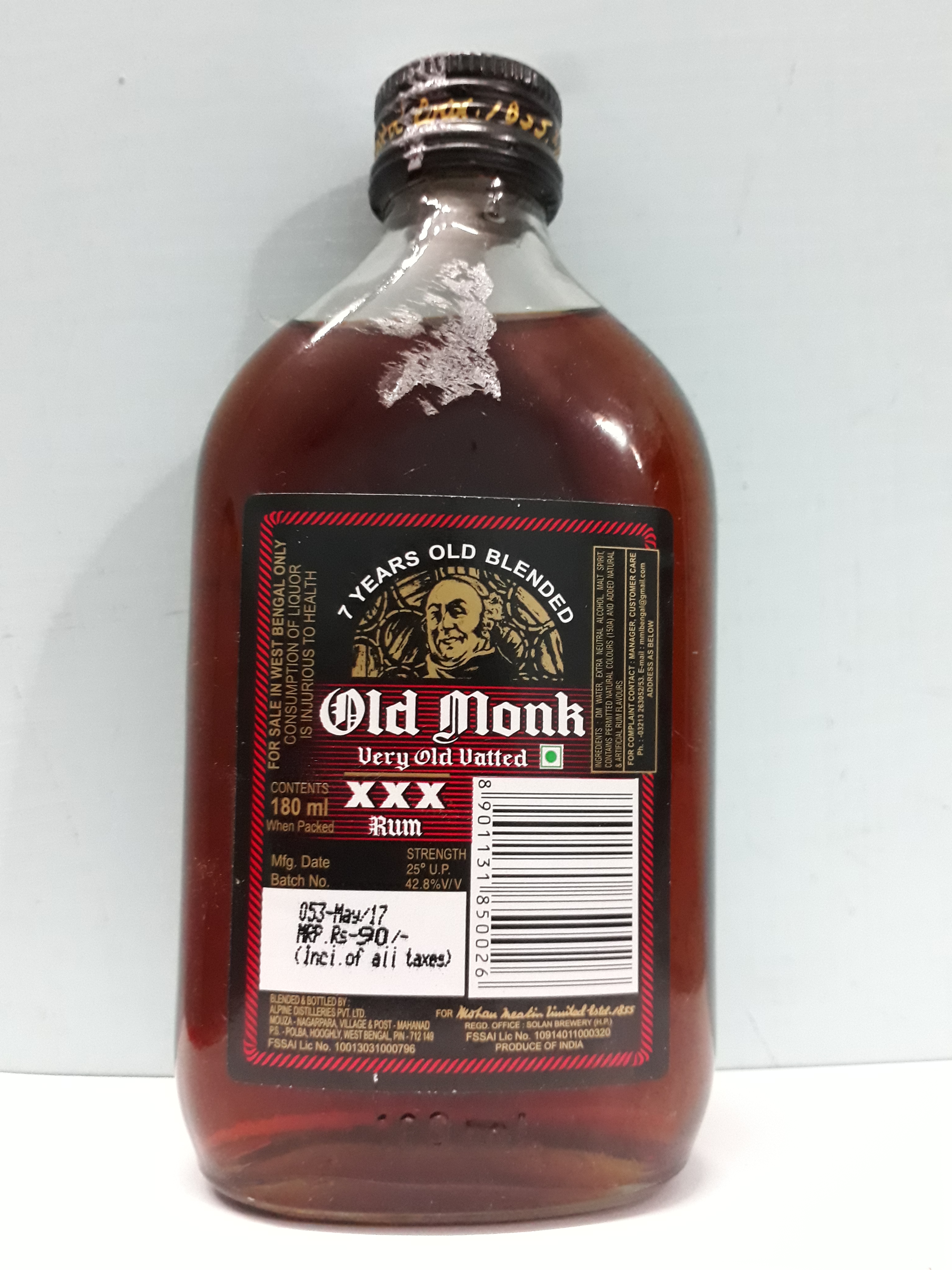
Popular Bottle of Old Monk Rum

In 1855, Edward Dyer set up a brewery in Kasauli, Himachal Pradesh to cater to the British requirement for cheap beer. This brewery changed hands and eventually became a distillery by the name of Mohan Meakin Pvt. Ltd.

Old Monk, reportedly a creation of Ved Rattan Mohan, former managing director of Mohan Meakin, was first introduced in India in December of 1954. Colonel Ved Mohan, brother of Kapil Mohan, had been inspired by the serene life of Benedictine monks and the drinks they brewed as they led their ascetic life in the mountains where they lived in content, which inspired the naming of the drink. Old Monk soon surpassed Hercules rum in favor among the Indian armed forces. The brand soon became one of the leading dark rums in the world and perhaps the most popular IMFL brand in the country. The affordable pricing strategy has also worked in their favor.

== Production ==
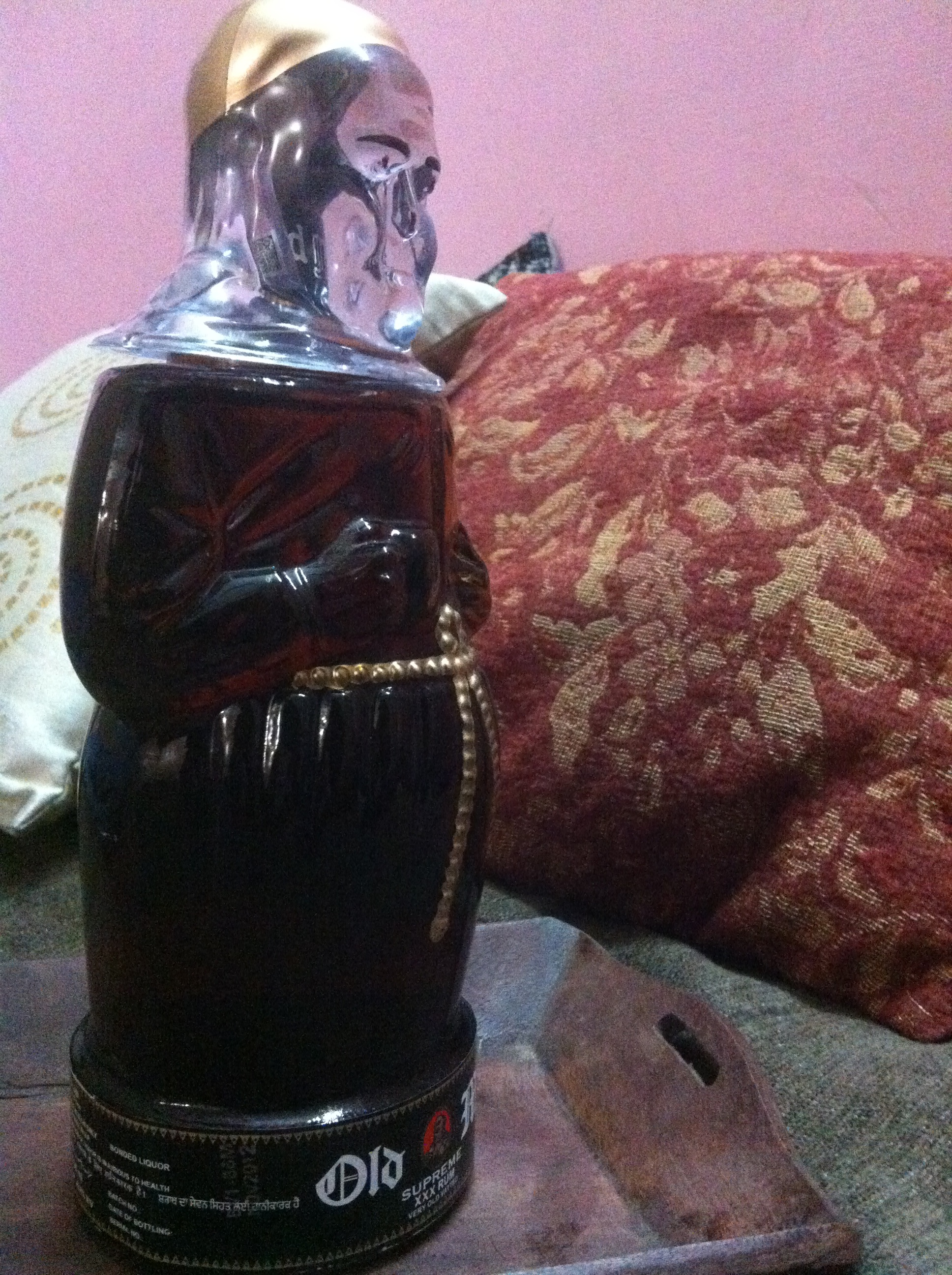
Old Monk Supreme rum, bottled in the distinctive glass monk statuette.

Old Monk rums are produced in Ghaziabad, Uttar Pradesh. Some notable expressions include:

- Old Monk XXX is a rum made from molasses, which is then aged in oak barrels for a minimum of 7 years, then vatted, infused with spices, and bottled.
- Old Monk 20 Amber XO is a blend of the classic Old Monk XXX combined with a 20 year old rum.
- Old Monk Supreme is a rum made from molasses, which is then aged in oak barrels for a minimum of 12 years, then vatted, infused with spices, and bottled in a glass statuette of a monk.
- Old Monk The Legend is a rum made from various raw materials, which is then aged in oak barrels for a minimum of 7 years, then vatted, infused with spices, and bottled in a glass statuette of a monk's head.

== Awards ==
In 1982, Old Monk XXX rum received gold medals at Monde Selection. In 2012, it won gold medal at the World Spirits Competition. Old Monk was ranked 5th among Indian spirits brands at the Impact International's 2008 list of "Top 100 Brands At Retail Value" with a retail value of US$240 million.

== See also ==
- Alcoholic Indian beverages
- List of vedic and ayurvedic alcoholic drinks
- Desi daru
- Indian-made foreign liquor (IMFL)
- Indian whisky
