= Edward Dyer (brewer) =

British brewer in India

Edward Abraham Dyer
- Born: July 7, 1831; Calcutta, India
- Died: April 23, 1902 (aged 70); Simla, British Raj
- Spouse: Mary Passmore
- Children: 9, one of which was Reginald Dyer.

Edward Abraham Dyer was born in 1831 in Calcutta to John and Julia Dyer. He studied engineering in England. He met and married Mary Passmore before using the money that was supposed to be for his commission to return to India and set up a brewery in Kasauli, which then incorporated in 1855 as Dyer Breweries Ltd. The brewery moved to the nearby town of Solan and the Kasauli Brewery was turned into a distillery. Dyer expanded production to the cities of Lucknow and Mandalay as well before eventually selling the business to H.G. Meakin in 1877.

== Personal life ==
Dyer and his wife, Mary, had nine children, including Reginald Dyer, who would go on to be responsible for the 1919 Amritsar massacre.
