= Kasauli Brewery and Distillery =

Indian brewery and distillery

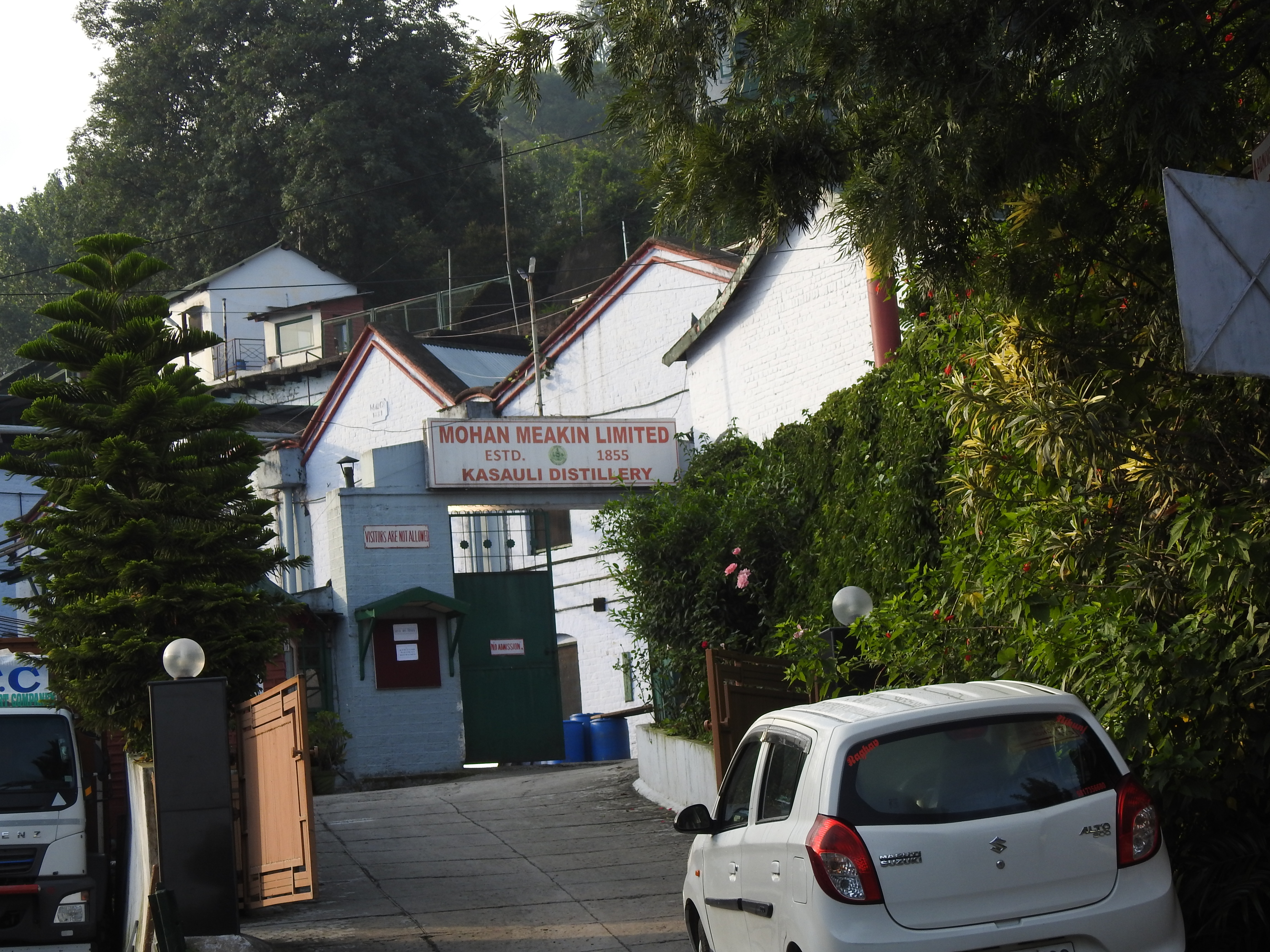
- Location: Kasauli, Himachal Pradesh, India
- Coordinates: 30.9032°N 76.9748°E
- Opened: 1920s
- Owned by: Mohan Meakin

Kasauli Brewery and Distillery (formerly a brewery and presently a distillery), in Kasauli in the Solan district of Himachal Pradesh, was established in 1855 by Edward Dyer. It started producing Asia's first beer brand, Lion Beer, and India's first single malt whisky, Solan No. 1. Both of these brands are still in production. The production of Lion beer was moved 25 km east to Solan Brewery at Solan, due to water scarcity, after the population of Kasauli increased around the brewery. Lion beer was originally an India Pale Ale (IPA), but the beer style was changed to lager in 1960s.

Mohan Meakin, the present owner of the Kasauli and Solan breweries and distilleries, has several liquor brands including Old Monk rum; whiskies including Solan No. 1, Diplomat Deluxe, Colonel's Special, Black Knight, and Summer Hall; gin such as London Dry; and Kaplanski vodka, all produced at various production facilities across India.

Kasauli Brewery, with its bar and brewery both open to public, is 9.3 km west of the Sonwara railway station on the Kalka–Shimla railway – a UNESCO World Heritage Site.

== History ==
In 1830, Edward Dyer moved back to India from England to set up the first brewery in India (later incorporated as Dyer Breweries in 1855) at Kasauli in the Himalayas.

Dyer brought with him, brewing and distillation equipment from England and Scotland, which came by sailing ship as far up the Yamuna-Ganges rivers as possible, before being loaded onto ox drawn carts and taken up to the Himalayas via the Grand Trunk Road route to Shimla. In 1842, a small cantonment of British Indian Army at Kasauli was established.

Dyer selected the location of his brewery due to the quality of the springwater available there and because the climate at this altitude was similar to the climate of Scotland. His stated ambition was "to produce a malt whisky as fine as Scotch whisky," albeit from much higher highlands. Another reason for this location was that there was a ready market of British troops and civilians in Shimla and elsewhere in Punjab for his products.

After the town of Kasauli was established and began using much of the springwater, the brewery was dismantled and production moved to nearby Solan, where a brewery was originally established in 1820, close to the British summer capital Shimla. The Kasauli brewery site was converted to a distillery, which Mohan Meakin Ltd. still operates. However, the distillery remains at Kasauli and is the oldest operating distillery in Asia and one of the oldest whisky making distilleries in continuous operation anywhere in the world.

In 1887, another British entrepreneur H. G. Meakin who had moved to India, bought old Shimla and Solan Breweries from Edward Dyer

In 1949 following independence, Narendra Nath Mohan raised funds and travelled to London, where he bought a majority stake in Dyer Meakin Breweries and acquired all the assets of Dyer Meakin Breweries in India including the Kasauli Brewery and Distillery.

== Products ==
=== Lion beer ===
Lion Beer, is Asia's oldest beer brand still continuously in production, initially at Kasauli Brewery and then at Solan Brewery, first as India Pale Ale (IPA) till 1960 and as lager beer thereafter. Lion's popularity with the British during the heyday of the empire led to the start-up of other Lion beers around the world, in New Zealand, South Africa and elsewhere. Lion beer produced in Sri Lanka remains the number-one brand in Sri Lanka, where Mohan Meakin introduced it in the 1884s through their Ceylon brewery.

From 1840s until the 1960s, Lion remained the number one beer in India for over a century. After this, another Mohan Meakin brand, Golden Eagle, took the number one place until the 1980s, when Kingfisher became number one. Lion was originally an India Pale Ale (IPA) but the beer style was changed in the 1960s to a lager.

=== Solan No.1 whisky ===
Solan No.1 whisky, is one of the first single malt whiskies which is still in production since 1820s, albeit in a different form. It was initially produced at Solan distillery owned by Dyer. Its production was moved to Kasauli brewery when swapped distillery at Solan Brewery was moved to Kasauli as a swap due to shortage of springwater for beer production at Kasauli. In 1887 Dyer sold the Solan Brewery to Meakin. It is still in production at Kasauli Brewery using some of the original equipment including the copper pot still. Historically, the main whisky brand made by the Kasauli distillery was a well regarded malt whisky named "Solan No. 1" named after the nearby town of Solan. It remains the only malt whisky made in the Himalayas.

== Gallery ==
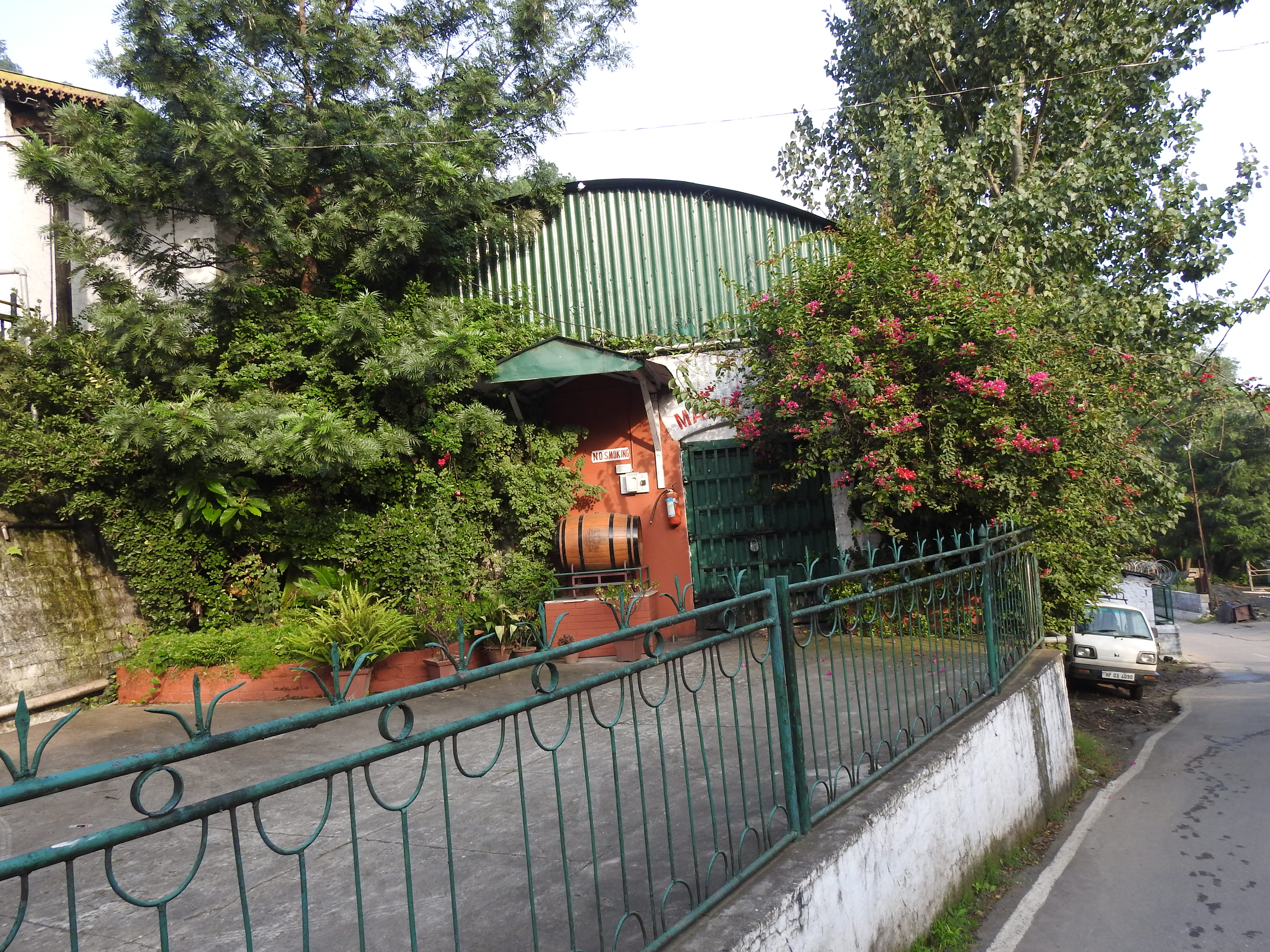

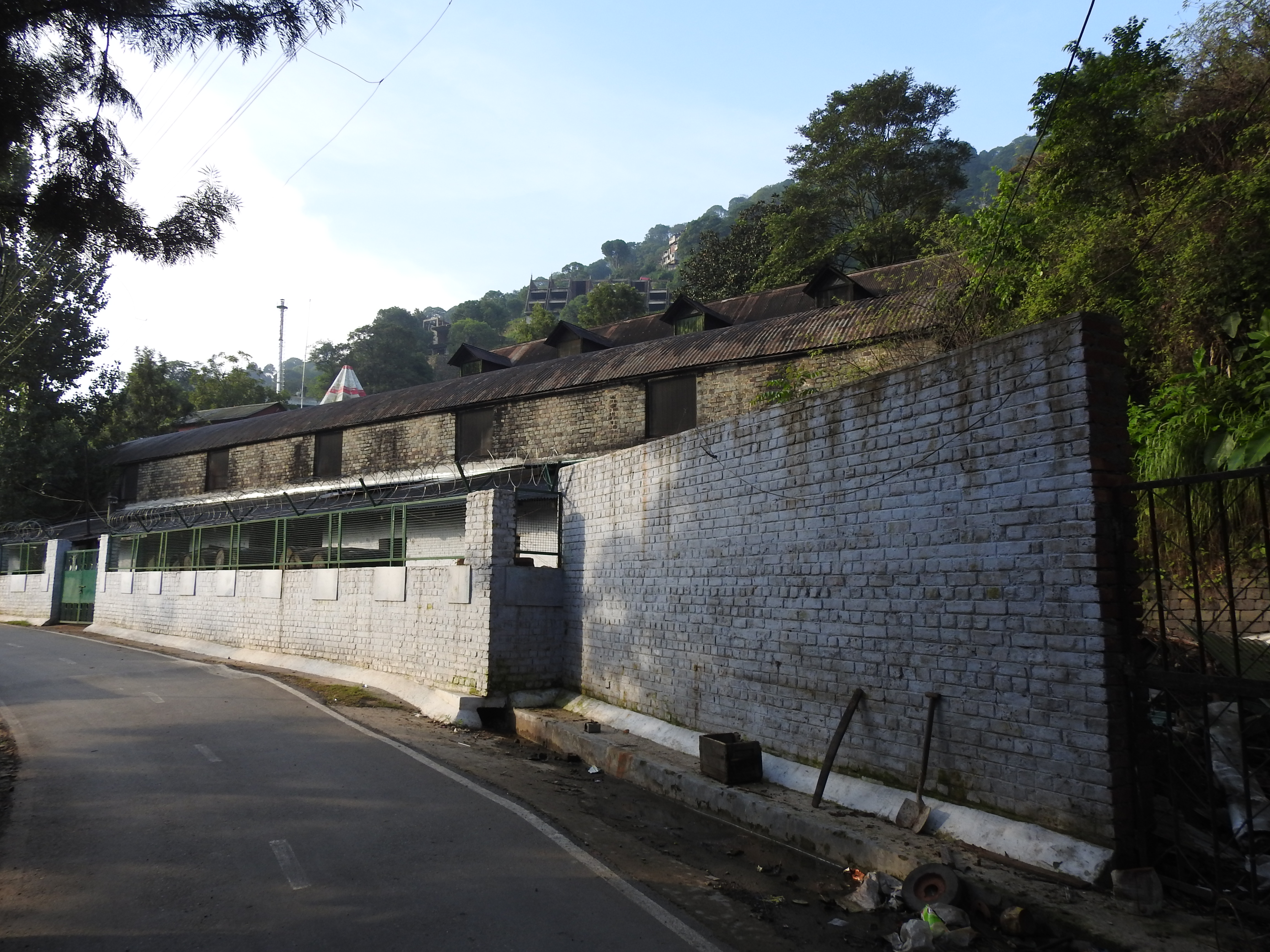

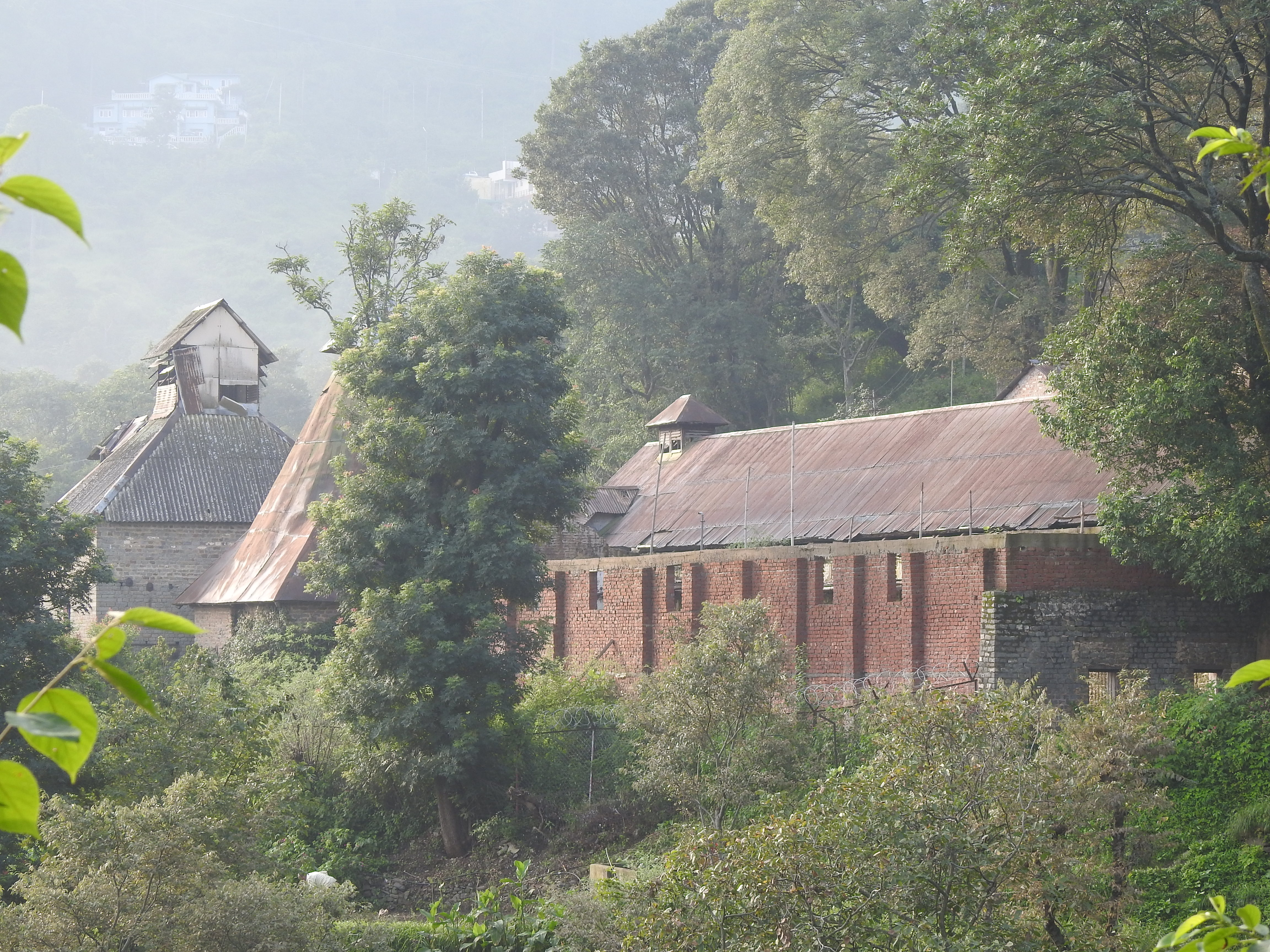

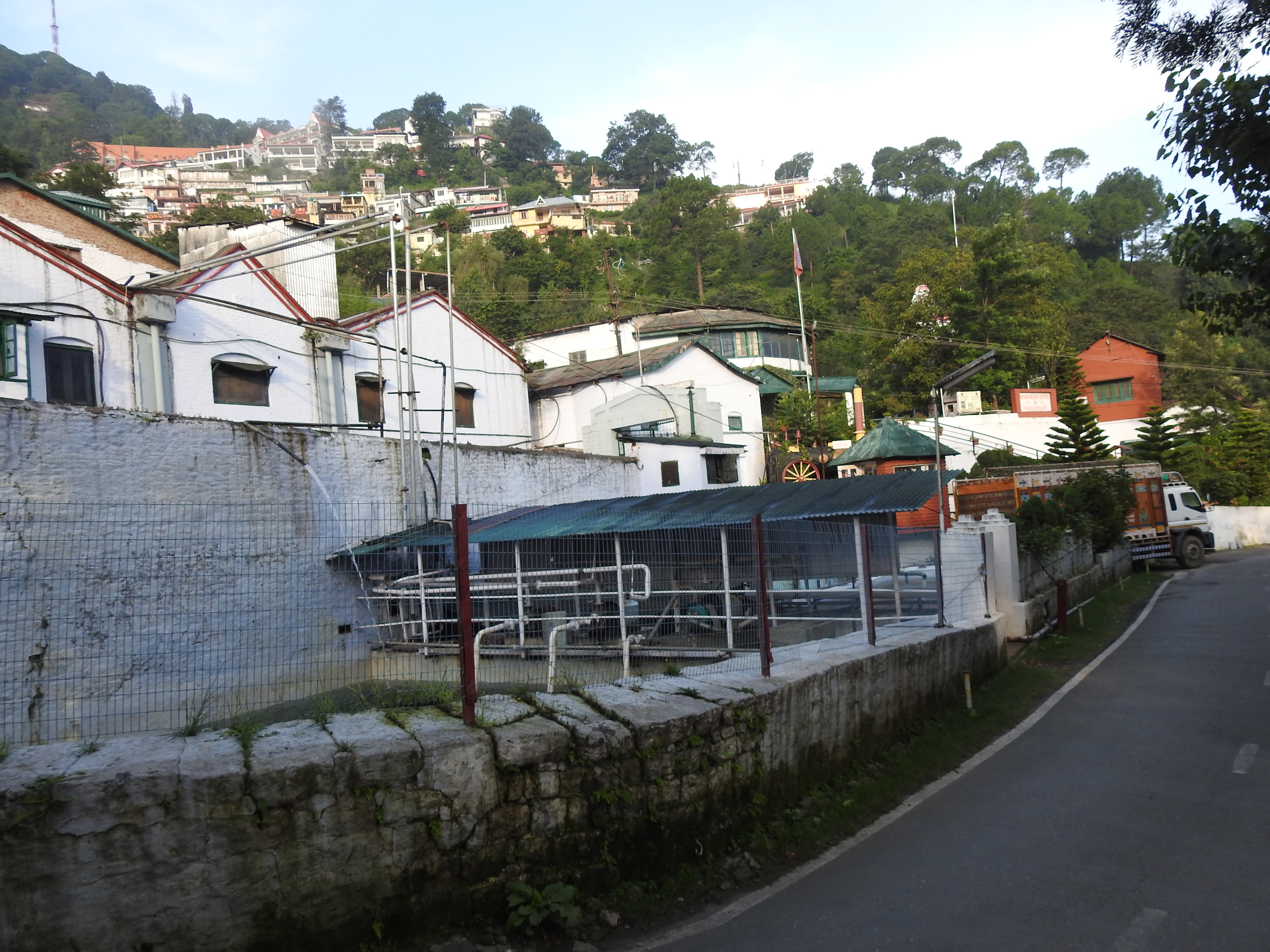

== See also ==
- Beer in India
- Indian whisky
- Indian-made foreign liquor
