= Bombay Prohibition (Gujarat Amendment) Act, 2009 =

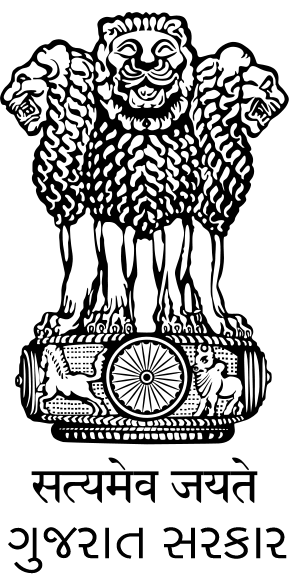

Gujarat Legislative Assembly
- Passed: 2009
- Status: In force

The Bombay Prohibition (Gujarat Amendment) Act, 2009 is an Act of Gujarat Legislative Assembly which prohibits manufacture, selling, buying or distributing of Laththa (spurious liquor).

The Act defines Laththa as spurious liquor, which contains methanol or any other poisonous substances which may cause harmful or injurious effects to the human body or death of a person.

The Act also makes it a punishable offence for the person involved in construction or working in any distillery or brewery making laththa.

The Act has a provision for death sentence or life imprisonment for those found guilty of manufacturing and selling spurious liquor in cases where those who consumed the spurious liquor have died. Vehicles seized in which the liquor is transported are auctioned and the proceeds deposited in the state government treasury.

== See also ==
- 2009 Gujarat alcohol poisonings
- Laththa Commission
