= Sura (alcoholic drink) =

Indian alcoholic drink

Sura or Sooraa (Sanskrit and Pāli; Devanāgarī: सुरा) is a strong distilled alcoholic drink originating from the Indian subcontinent. It is referred to as an anaesthetic by Suśruta (a surgeon in India circa 400 BCE). Other ancient medical authorities also mention it; Charaka referred to making a woman with a miscarriage senseless to pain by administering alcoholic drinks like sooraa, sīdhu, ariṣṭa, madhu, madirā or āsava.

== History ==
The method for preparation appears in the Atharvaveda in the Kandas 5 and 8.

In Buddhist texts surāh is mentioned as one of intoxicating drinks, along with (Pali) meraya (Sanskrit maireya, a drink made with sugar cane and several spices) and majja (maybe equivalent of Sanskrit madhu, mead or hydromel), and renunciation of its usage constitutes the 5th of the Buddhist precepts (pañca-sīlāni): "I undertake the training rule to abstain from fermented drinks which cause heedlessness" (Surāmerayamajjapamādaṭṭhānā veramaṇī sikkhāpadaṃ samādiyāmi).

== Vedic beverages ==
Following types of fermented alcoholic beverages are mentioned in various vedic texts including the ayurveda. Madira is the blanket term, including for Soma (sacred drink from ephedra plant), Sura (from fermented grains), Sidhu (from sugarcane juice or molasses) - molasses-based desi daru is modern version, Madhu (fermented water-mixed honey), Arishta (medicinal concoction fermented from boiled herbs and spices), and Asava (medicinal concoction fermented from un-boiled juice of herbs and spices).

Scholarly analysis of Vedic texts indicates that Sura was a mildly fermented grain beverage (often from Barley, Rice or Millet) rather than a distilled spirit.

All these were fermented, not distilled, were similar to modern beer and wine with alcohol content ranging from about 3.5% ABV to more than 20%.

- Madira - a general blanket term for alcoholic beverages, including those made from grains, fruits, and flowers: The specific methods of preparation varied depending on the source material, consumed by both commoners and priests, often during social gatherings and religious ceremonies.
- Soma - rare sacred alcoholic drink from the sacred ephedra plant: The filtered juice of crushed ephedra plant was mixed with milk, yogurt, or honey before fermenting. Soma was used in vedic rituals, offered to the gods and consumed by priests as it was believed to induce altered states of consciousness and was associated with divine power and immortality.
- Sura - more common sacred alcoholic drink from fermented grains like barley: germinated grains were fermented. Sura was a more common beverage compared to Soma, consumed by both commoners and priests, offered to the gods during rituals and also used in social gatherings.
- Sidhu - stronger and sweet alcoholic drink from sugarcane juice or molasses: The sugarcane juice was boiled down to a thick syrup, which was then fermented resulting in a sweet taste and more potent alcoholic beverage, often consumed during festivals and celebrations. Modern version of it can be found in some of the types and brands of desi daru made from molasses.
- Madhu - alcoholic drink made from fermenting honey mixed with water: A sweet and intoxicating drink, often consumed during festivals and celebrations, and was also offered to the gods during sacrifices.
- Arishta - fermented medicinal alcoholic drink made from herbs and spices boiled in water: The herbs and spices were boiled in water to make decoction (kashaya in sanskrit language, kadha in hindi language) to extract their medicinal properties, and the resulting decoction was then fermented. It was also offered to the gods during sacrifices.
- Asava - fermented medicinal alcoholic drink made from extracted un-boiled juices of herbs and spices: Similar to Arishta, except that the juices were boiled for the arishta and for asava the juices were extracted and directly fermented without boiling, though both were used as medicinal remedies for therapeutic purposes to cure various ailments. It was also offered to the gods during sacrifices.

== See also ==
- Alcoholic Indian beverages
  - Beer in India
  - Desi daru
  - Indian whisky
- Sur, a Komi ale related to sura
