= List of tallest buildings in Bengaluru =

Tall buildings in Bengaluru
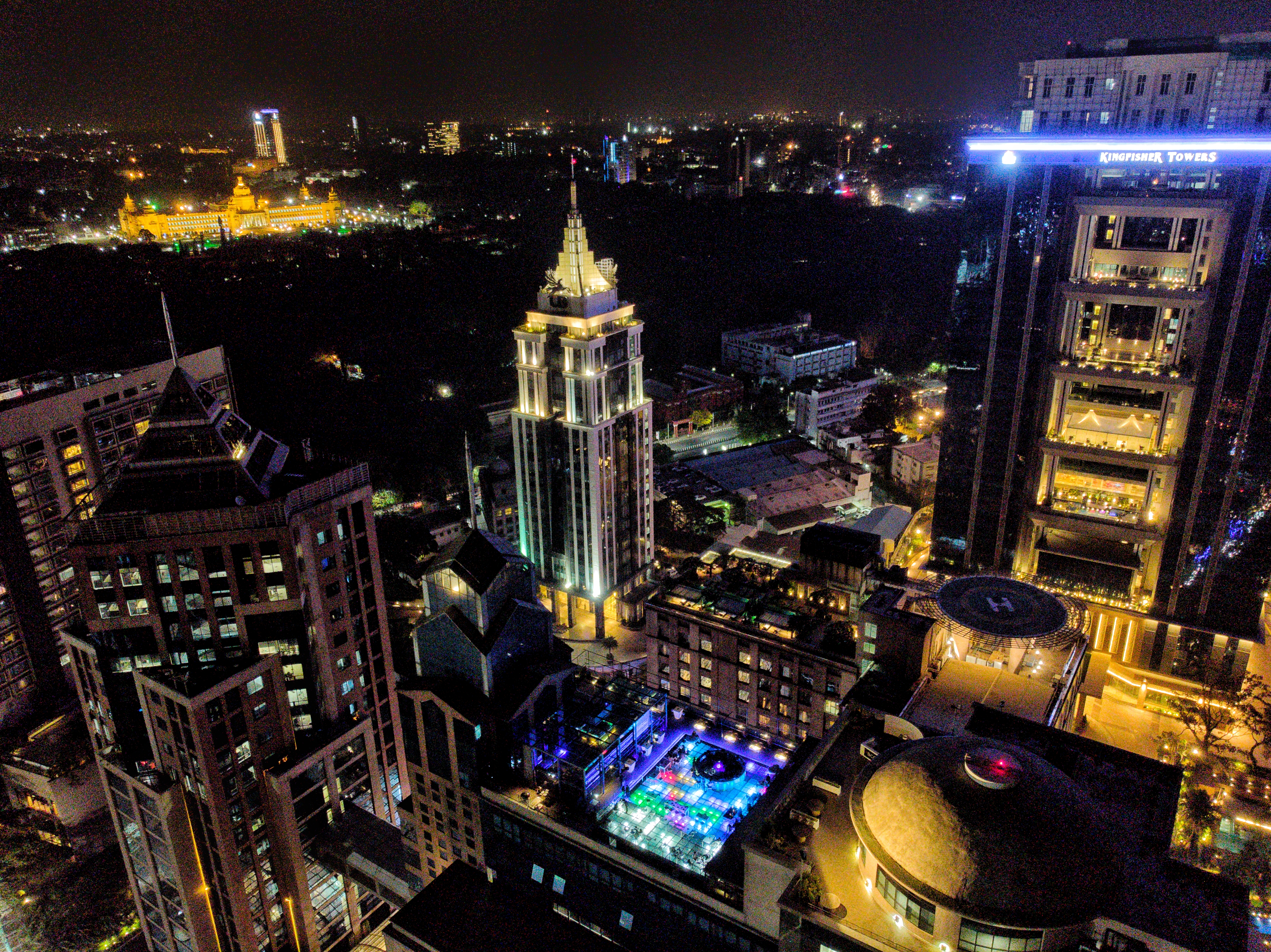
- Bengaluru's Central Business District skyline at night
- Tallest building: CNTC Presidential Tower (2023)
- Tallest building height: 161 metres (528 ft)
- First 150 m+ building: Mantri DSK Pinnacle (2013)

Number of tall buildings
- Taller than 100 m (328 ft): 101 (2026)
- Taller than 150 m (492 ft): 2 (2026)

Bengaluru, often referred to as the technology capital of India, is experiencing a significant boom in high-rise construction. The city has emerged as one of the fastest-growing cities globally, attracting a highly skilled workforce from across the country seeking employment and business opportunities. This rapid urban growth has led to a sustained demand for both residential and commercial real estate, prompting a shift towards vertical development.

The tallest building in Bengaluru is the CNTC Presidential Tower, which topped out in early 2023. Standing at 161 metres (528 ft) with 50 floors, it is also the tallest building in the state of Karnataka and was the 11th-tallest in South India at the time of its completion. The tallest commercial building is the World Trade Center, which was completed in 2010 and rises to 128 metres (420 ft) with 32 floors.

Other notable high-rises in the city include UB Tower, Mantri DSK Pinnacle, and Phoenix One Bangalore West. Among the tallest skyscrapers currently under construction are the four towers of Codename Peaklife project, each projected to reach a height of 231 metres (758 ft).

== History ==
The first high-rise building in Bengaluru over 100 metres (328 ft) was the Public Utility Building on M.G. Road. Standing at 106 metres (348 ft) with 25 floors, it was the tallest building in India at the time of its completion in 1973 before being surpassed by the World Trade Centre Mumbai in 1974. The Public Utility Building was only the second building in India to surpass a height of 100 metres (328 ft) and remained a dominant feature of Bengaluru's skyline for decades. The building housed offices, retail outlets, and a hotel, and served as an early example of vertical mixed-use development in the country.

=== Late 20th century: Early developments ===
Bengaluru's ascent as a technology centre began in the 1980s and 1990s with the establishment of major IT parks like Electronic City and Whitefield. Early high-rises were limited, primarily low-rise and mid-rise office buildings, due to regulatory constraints and proximity to the HAL Airport, which was located in the heart of the city and served as the city's only airport until 2008.

=== 2000s: Policy reforms and rise in vertical development ===
The Bangalore Development Authority (BDA) and the newly-formed Bruhat Bengaluru Mahanagara Palike (BBMP) relaxed the floor area ratio (FAR) norms in the 2000s, particularly in newly planned zones like the Outer Ring Road and North Bengaluru. Moreover, with the inauguration of the Kempegowda International Airport in 2008 and cessation of commercial flight operation at the HAL Airport in May 2008, the height restrictions in several parts of the city were relaxed. This resulted in a surge of mid-rise construction across both residential and commercial use. The late 2000s witnessed the completion of several iconic high-rises like the Canberra Tower, Concorde Tower, and UB Tower, all of which were completed within the UB City complex in 2008. At 123 metres (404 ft) in height, UB Tower surpassed the Public Utility Building, which had remained the tallest building in Bengaluru for 35 years.

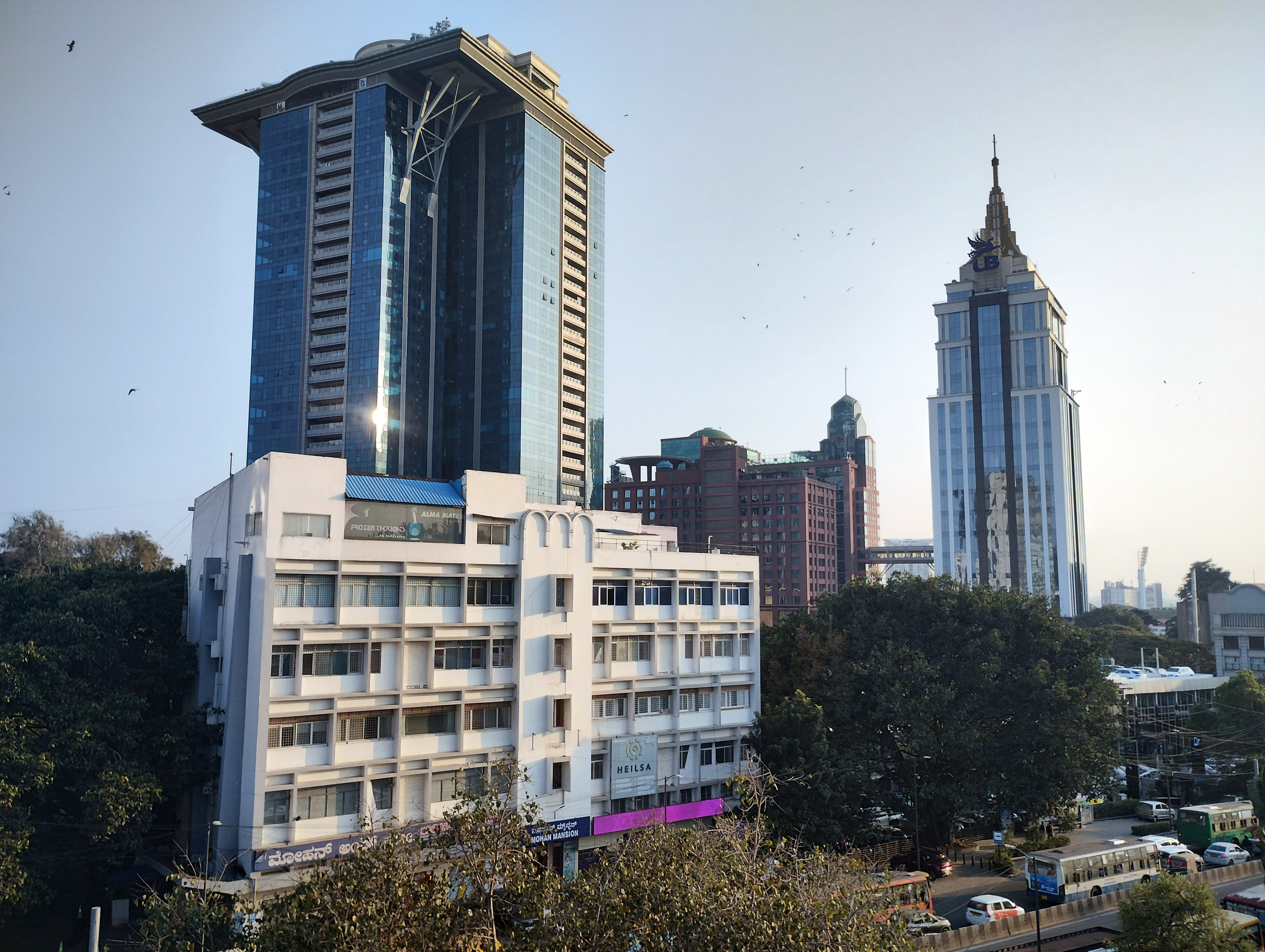
Bengaluru's skyline viewed from Central Business District

=== 2010s–2020s: Skyscraper era ===
The completion of the World Trade Center in 2010 (128m, 32 floors) signaled strong momentum towards vertical development in the city. The UB Tower and the World Trade Center were among the first glass-clad high-rises in the city and set a design template for subsequent development. A combination of soaring demand, scarcity of land within key business districts, and rising office prices accelerated construction of high-rise buildings. Mantri DSK Pinnacle, which was also the tallest building in South India when it topped out in 2013 at 153 metres (502 ft), marked Bengaluru's entry into the skyscraper era.

Several residential and mixed-use mega projects are under construction in emerging suburbs along transit corridors and satellite towns. As of 2025, over 1,500 high-rise buildings dot the metropolitan region, and that number continues to grow, signifying the city's sustained push toward vertical expansion.

== Tallest buildings ==
This list ranks buildings in Bengaluru that stand at least 100 metres (328 ft) or 30 floors from the ground. This includes spires and architectural details but does not include antenna masts. Only completed buildings and under-construction buildings that have been topped out are included.

Was the tallest building in India upon completion
Indicates buildings still under construction that have been architecturally topped out but not yet fully opened

Rank	Name	Image	Location	Height	Floors	Year	Use	Notes
1	CNTC Presidential Tower		Yeshwantpur	161 metres (528 ft)	50	2023	Residential	As of 2025, the terrace level is at 1061 meters above sea level, which is the highest building altitude among metro cities in India.
2	Mantri DSK Pinnacle		Hulimavu	153 metres (502 ft)	46	2013	Residential	The first Skyscraper of Bengaluru and also the former tallest building of South India. It is known for its unique structure
3	M5 Mahendra Echelon		Electronic City Bommasandra	148metres [486 ft]	46	2031	Residential	Tallest Towers Of Electronic City.
4	SNN Clermont 1		Nagavara	135 metres (443 ft)	40	2018	Residential	
4	SNN Clermont 2		Nagavara	135 metres (443 ft)	40	2018	Residential	
4	SNN Clermont 3		Nagavara	135 metres (443 ft)	40	2019	Residential	
4	SNN Clermont 4		Nagavara	135 metres (443 ft)	40	2019	Residential	
4	SNN Clermont 5		Nagavara	135 metres (443 ft)	40	2019	Residential	
5	Total Environment- In That Quiet Earth Tower 1		Bileshivale	130 metres (427 ft)	39	2023	Residential	
5	Total Environment- In That Quiet Earth Tower 2		Bileshivale	130 metres (427 ft)	39	2023	Residential	
5	Total Environment- In That Quiet Earth Tower 3		Bileshivale	130 metres (427 ft)	39	2023	Residential	
5	Total Environment- In That Quiet Earth Tower 4		Bileshivale	130 metres (427 ft)	39	2023	Residential	
12	Sobha Indraprastha		Rajajinagar	130 metres (427 ft)	37	2018	Residential	
13	World Trade Center Bangalore		Rajajinagar	128 metres (420 ft)	32	2010	Commercial	Tallest Commercial Tower of Bengaluru. It was the tallest building in Bengaluru from 2010-2013.
14	Columbia Aaltius		Electronic City Veersandra	127 metres (417 ft)	38	2025	Residential	
15	Pashmina Waterfront Tower 1	Pashmina Waterfront Bengaluru	Battarahalli	124.75 metres (409 ft)	39	2016	Residential	
15	Pashmina Waterfront Tower 2	Pashmina Waterfront Bengaluru	Battarahalli	124.75 metres (409 ft)	39	2016	Residential	
15	Pashmina Waterfront Tower 3	Pashmina Waterfront Bengaluru	Battarahalli	124.75 metres (409 ft)	39	2016	Residential	
15	Pashmina Waterfront Tower 4	Pashmina Waterfront Bengaluru	Battarahalli	124.75 metres (409 ft)	39	2016	Residential	
15	Pashmina Waterfront Tower 5	Pashmina Waterfront Bengaluru	Battarahalli	124.75 metres (409 ft)	39	2016	Residential	
20	UB Tower	UB Tower	Bengaluru Central Business District	123 metres (404 ft)	20	2008	Commercial	Most popular high-rise of Bengaluru. It was the tallest tower from 2008-2013
20	Krishvi BVL Statura	Krishvi BVL Statura, Bengaluru	Konadasapura	123 metres (404 ft)	37	2025	Residential	
22	Kingfisher Towers	Kingfisher Towers Bangalore	Bengaluru Central Business District	122 metres (400 ft)	34	2018	Residential	
23	Brigade Exotica 1		Aavalahalli	120 metres (394 ft)	35	2014	Residential	
23	Brigade Exotica 2		Aavalahalli	120 metres (394 ft)	35	2016	Residential	
23	Navami Landmark 1		Rajarajeshwarinagar	120 metres (394 ft)	35	2023	Residential	
23	Navami Landmark 2		Rajarajeshwarinagar	120 metres (394 ft)	35	2023	Residential	
23	Navami Landmark 3		Rajarajeshwarinagar	120 metres (394 ft)	35	2023	Residential	
23	Navami Landmark 4		Rajarajeshwarinagar	120 metres (394 ft)	35	2023	Residential	
29	Sobha Manhattan Tower 4		Attibele	118.7 metres (389 ft)	39	2025	Residential	
29	Sobha Manhattan Tower 1		Attibele	118.7 metres (389 ft)	39	2026	Residential	
31	Sobha Brooklyn Towers 1	2026	Attibele	118.35 metres (388 ft)	36	2026	Residential	
31	Sobha Brooklyn Towers 2	2026	Attibele	118.35 metres (388 ft)	36	2026	Residential	
31	Sobha Brooklyn Towers 3	2026	Attibele	118.35 metres (388 ft)	36	2026	Residential	
34	DNR Highline	DNR Highline Bengaluru	Rajajinagar	118 metres (387 ft)	36	2025	Residential	
35	Sobha Manhattan Tower 3	High-rise building in Bangalore	Attibele	115.7 metres (380 ft)	38	2025	Residential	
35	Sobha Manhattan Tower 2		Attibele	115.7 metres (380 ft)	38	2026	Residential	
37	Prestige Trade Tower		Bengaluru Central Business District	115 metres (377 ft)	27	2017	Commercial	
37	Concorde Tower		Bengaluru Central Business District	115 metres (377 ft)	20	2008	Commercial	
37	Karle Zenith 1		Nagavara	115 metres (377 ft)	34	2016	Residential	
37	Karle Zenith 2		Nagavara	115 metres (377 ft)	34	2016	Residential	
37	Karle Zenith 3		Nagavara	115 metres (377 ft)	34	2016	Residential	
37	Karle's Vario Homes 1	Karle’s Vario Homes Bengaluru	Nagavara	115 metres (377 ft)	34	2025	Residential	
37	Karle's Vario Homes 2	Karle’s Vario Homes Bengaluru	Nagavara	115 metres (377 ft)	34	2025	Residential	
37	Karle Pinnacle Homes 1	Karle’s Tech Centre	Nagavara	115 metres (377 ft)	35	2026	Residential	
37	Karle Pinnacle Homes 2	Karle’s Tech Centre	Nagavara	115 metres (377 ft)	35	2026	Residential	
37	Bhartiya City Nikoo Homes 4 Tower A	Nikoo homes Bengaluru	Thanisandra	115 metres (377 ft)	34	2025	Residential	
37	Bhartiya City Nikoo Homes 4 Tower B	Nikoo homes Bengaluru	Thanisandra	115 metres (377 ft)	34		Residential	
37	Bhartiya City Nikoo Homes 4 Tower C	Nikoo homes Bengaluru	Thanisandra	115 metres (377 ft)	34		Residential	
49	Purva Atmosphere 1	Purva Atmosphere Bengaluru	Thanisandra	114.1 metres (374 ft)	34	2025	Residential	
49	Purva Atmosphere 2	Purva Atmosphere Bengaluru	Thanisandra	114.1 metres (374 ft)	34	2025	Residential	
49	Purva Atmosphere 3	Purva Atmosphere Bengaluru	Thanisandra	114.1 metres (374 ft)	34	2025	Residential	
52	Salarpuria Gold Summit A		Byrathi	112 metres (367 ft)	32	2013	Residential	
53	Mahendra Arto Helix		Electronic City	110 metres [360ft]	34	2028	Residential	
54	Four Seasons Private Residences			108 metres (354 ft)	30	2018	Residential	
54	Phoenix Kessaku		Rajajinagar	108 metres (354 ft)	30	2018	Residential	
55	One Bangalore West 3		Rajajinagar	106.5 metres (349 ft)	30	2016	Residential	
55	One Bangalore West 4		Rajajinagar	106.5 metres (349 ft)	30	2016	Residential	
55	One Bangalore West 5		Rajajinagar	106.5 metres (349 ft)	30	2016	Residential	
58	Public Utility Building		MG Road Bengaluru Central Business District	106 metres (348 ft)	25	1973	Commercial	It was the tallest building in India for a year and remained Bengaluru's tallest for 35 years.
59	Maya Indradhanush		Mallasandra	105 metres (344 ft)	33	2018	Residential	
59	Bhartiya City Nikoo Homes-2 A		Thanisandra	105 metres (344 ft)	33	2020	Residential	
59	Bhartiya City Nikoo Homes-2 B		Thanisandra	105 metres (344 ft)	33	2020	Residential	
59	Bhartiya City Nikoo Homes-2 C		Thanisandra	105 metres (344 ft)	33	2020	Residential	
59	Bhartiya City Nikoo Homes-2 D		Thanisandra	105 metres (344 ft)	33	2020	Residential	
59	Bhartiya City Nikoo Homes-2 H		Thanisandra	105 metres (344 ft)	33	2021	Residential	
59	Bhartiya City Nikoo Homes-2 J		Thanisandra	105 metres (344 ft)	33	2021	Residential	
59	Total Environment- The Magic Faraway Tree Tower 2		Talaghattapura	105 metres (344 ft)	33	2023	Residential	
59	Total Environment- The Magic Faraway Tree Tower 3		Talaghattapura	105 metres (344 ft)	33	2023	Residential	
59	Total Environment- The Magic Tree Tower 4		Talaghattapura	105 metres (344 ft)	33	2023	Residential	
59	Shapoorji Pallonji Park West Magnolia		Binnypete	105 metres (344 ft)	33	2025	Residential	
59	Shapoorji Pallonji Park West Sapphire		Binnypete	105 metres (344 ft)	33	2025	Residential	
59	Shapoorji Pallonji Park West Pine	Shapoorji Pollanji	Binnypete	105 metres (344 ft)	33	2025	Residential	
59	Shapoorji Pallonji Park West Oak	Shapoorji Pollanji Parkwest oak	Binnypete	105 metres (344 ft)	33	2025	Residential	
59	Shapoorji Pallonji Park West Maple		Binnypete	105 metres (344 ft)	32	2020	Residential	
59	Aquila Heights Polaris		Jalahalli	105 metres (344 ft)	32	2012	Residential	
59	Canberra Tower		Bengaluru Central Business District	105 metres (344 ft)	20	2008	Commercial	
59	Mantri Central		Malleshwaram	105 metres (344 ft)	30	2018	Commercial	
59	Prestige Falcon City Tower 1		Konanakunte	105 metres (344 ft)	32	2019	Residential	
59	Prestige Falcon City Tower 2		Konanakunte	105 metres (344 ft)	32	2019	Residential	
59	Prestige Falcon City Tower 3		Konanakunte	105 metres (344 ft)	32	2019	Residential	
59	Prestige Falcon City Tower 4		Konanakunte	105 metres (344 ft)	32	2019	Residential	
59	Prestige Falcon City Tower 5		Konanakunte	105 metres (344 ft)	32	2019	Residential	
59	Sobha Royal Crest	Sobha Royal Crest	Banashankari	105 metres (344 ft)	32	2025	Residential	
83	One Bangalore West 1		Rajajinagar	104.55 metres (343 ft)	31	2016	Residential	
83	One Bangalore West 2		Rajajinagar	104.55 metres (343 ft)	31	2016	Residential	
85	Birla Tisya 1	Birla Tisya	Rajajinagar	102 metres (335 ft)	32	2025	Residential	
85	Birla Tisya 2	Birla Tisya	Rajajinagar	102 metres (335 ft)	32	2025	Residential	
85	GM Infinity - The 100 percent life (Tower A)		Bommasandra	102 metres (335 ft)	31	2023	Residential	
88	Prestige Lakeside Habitat Tower 1		Varthur	100 metres (328 ft)	30	2018	Residential	
88	Prestige Lakeside Habitat Tower 2		Varthur	100 metres (328 ft)	30	2018	Residential	
88	Prestige Lakeside Habitat Tower 3		Varthur	100 metres (328 ft)	30	2018	Residential	
88	Prestige Lakeside Habitat Tower 12		Varthur	100 metres (328 ft)	30	2018	Residential	
88	Prestige Lakeside Habitat Tower 13		Varthur	100 metres (328 ft)	30	2018	Residential	
88	Prestige Lakeside Habitat Tower 14		Varthur	100 metres (328 ft)	30	2018	Residential	
88	Prestige Lakeside Habitat Tower 15		Varthur	100 metres (328 ft)	30	2018	Residential	
88	Prestige Lakeside Habitat Tower 16		Varthur	100 metres (328 ft)	30	2018	Residential	
88	Prestige Lakeside Habitat Tower 17		Varthur	100 metres (328 ft)	30	2018	Residential	
88	Prestige Lakeside Habitat Tower 18		Varthur	100 metres (328 ft)	30	2018	Residential	
88	Arsis Green Hills Tower 1		Krishnarajapura	100 metres (328 ft)	30	2023	Residential	
88	Arsis Green Hills Tower 2		Krishnarajapura	100 metres (328 ft)	30	2023	Residential	
88	Valmark Apas		Hulimavu	100 metres (328 ft)	30	2016	Residential	
88	Four Seasons Hotel			100 metres (328 ft)	28	2019	Hotel	

== Tallest under construction ==
This list ranks buildings that are under construction in Bangalore and are planned to be over 30 floors tall or at least 100 metres (328 ft) in height. This height includes spires and architectural details but does not include antenna masts or lightning arresters. Buildings that are only approved, on hold, or proposed are not included in this table.

Rank	Name	Image	Location	Height	Floors	Use
1	Codename Peaklife Tower 1		Kengeri	231 metres (758 ft)	69	Residential
1	Codename Peaklife Tower 2		Kengeri	231 metres (758 ft)	69	Residential
1	Codename Peaklife Tower 3		Kengeri	231 metres (758 ft)	69	Residential
1	Codename Peaklife Tower 4		Kengeri	231 metres (758 ft)	69	Residential
5	Ruchira The Rise Tower A		Konadasapura	156 metres (512 ft)	G+42	Residential
6	Mista Sri City Bangalore Tower 1		Konadasapura	155.8 metres (511 ft)	5B + 52 Floors	Residential + Commercial
6	Mista Sri City Bangalore Tower 2		Konadasapura	155.8 metres (511 ft)	5B + 52 Floors	Residential + Commercial
6	Mista Sri City Bangalore Tower 3		Konadasapura	155.8 metres (511 ft)	5B + 52 Floors	Residential + Commercial
7	M5 Mahendra Echelon		Electronic City Bommasandra	148 metres	3B+G+46UF	Residential
9	Sobha Hamptons Tower 1		Attibele	145.45 metres (477 ft)	44	Residential
9	Sobha Hamptons Tower 2		Attibele	145.45 metres (477 ft)	44	Residential
9	Sobha Hamptons Tower 3		Attibele	145.45 metres (477 ft)	44	Residential
9	Sobha Hamptons Tower 4		Attibele	145.45 metres (477 ft)	44	Residential
9	Sobha Hamptons Tower 5		Attibele	145.45 metres (477 ft)	44	Residential
9	Sobha Hamptons Tower 6		Attibele	145.45 metres (477 ft)	44	Residential
15	Sobha Madison Heights Tower 1		Attibele	129.525 metres (425 ft)	41	Residential
15	Sobha Madison Heights Tower 2		Attibele	129.525 metres (425 ft)	41	Residential
15	Sobha Madison Heights Tower 3		Attibele	129.525 metres (425 ft)	41	Residential
15	Sobha Madison Heights Tower 4		Attibele	129.525 metres (425 ft)	41	Residential
15	Sobha Madison Heights Tower 5		Attibele	129.525 metres (425 ft)	41	Residential
15	Sobha Madison Heights Tower 6		Attibele	129.525 metres (425 ft)	41	Residential
15	Sobha Madison Heights Tower 7		Attibele	129.525 metres (425 ft)	41	Residential
22	Prestige Park Grove Tower 17		Kadugodi	128.55 metres (422 ft)	42	Residential
23	Aratt Ayatana		Electronic City	126.5 metres (415 ft)	42	Residential
24	Mantri Centrium		Seshadripuram	122 metres (400 ft)	39	Residential
25	Ruchira The Rise Tower B		Konadasapura	121 metres (397 ft)	G+34	Residential
26	Godrej Woodscapes Tower L		Whitefield	120.4 metres (395 ft)	40	Residential
26	Godrej Woodscapes Tower M		Whitefield	120.4 metres (395 ft)	40	Residential
26	Godrej Woodscapes Tower N		Whitefield	120.4 metres (395 ft)	40	Residential
29	Prestige Park Grove Tower 6		Kadugodi	119.4 metres (392 ft)	39	Residential
29	Prestige Park Grove Tower 16		Kadugodi	119.4 metres (392 ft)	39	Residential
31	Godrej Woodscapes Tower D		Whitefield	118.4 metres (388 ft)	39	Residential
31	Godrej Woodscapes Tower E		Whitefield	118.4 metres (388 ft)	39	Residential
31	Godrej Woodscapes Tower F		Whitefield	118.4 metres (388 ft)	39	Residential
31	Godrej Woodscapes Tower G		Whitefield	118.4 metres (388 ft)	39	Residential
31	Godrej Woodscapes Tower H		Whitefield	118.4 metres (388 ft)	39	Residential
31	Godrej Woodscapes Tower J		Whitefield	118.4 metres (388 ft)	39	Residential
31	Godrej Woodscapes Tower J		Whitefield	118.4 metres (388 ft)	39	Residential
38	Sobha Brooklyn Towers 4		Attibele	118.35 metres (388 ft)	36	Residential
38	Sobha Brooklyn Towers 5		Attibele	118.35 metres (388 ft)	36	Residential
40	Concorde Eleve		Avalahalli	117.15 metres (384 ft)	38	Residential
41	Godrej Woodscapes Tower A		Nimbekaipura	115.45 metres (379 ft)	39	Residential
41	Godrej Woodscapes Tower B		Nimbekaipura	115.45 metres (379 ft)	39	Residential
41	Godrej Woodscapes Tower C		Nimbekaipura	115.45 metres (379 ft)	39	Residential
44	Nitesh Park Avenue		Vasanth Nagar	114.3 metres (375 ft)	29	Residential
45	Trendsquares World of Gardens Tower 1		Whitefield	110.9 metres (364 ft)	G+35	Residential
45	Trendsquares World of Gardens Tower 1		Whitefield	110.9 metres (364 ft)	G+35	Residential
45	Trendsquares World of Gardens Tower 1		Whitefield	110.9 metres (364 ft)	G+35	Residential
45	Trendsquares World of Gardens Tower 1		Whitefield	110.9 metres (364 ft)	G+35	Residential
49	Prestige Park Grove Tower 5		Kadugodi	110.25 metres (362 ft)	36	Residential
49	Prestige Park Grove Tower 7		Kadugodi	110.25 metres (362 ft)	36	Residential
49	Prestige Park Grove Tower 11		Kadugodi	110.25 metres (362 ft)	36	Residential
49	Prestige Park Grove Tower 12		Kadugodi	110.25 metres (362 ft)	36	Residential
49	Prestige Park Grove Tower 15		Kadugodi	110.25 metres (362 ft)	36	Residential
54	Alembic Cloud Forest Tower A		Whitefield	105.7 metres (347 ft)	35	Residential
54	Alembic Cloud Forest Tower B		Whitefield	105.7 metres (347 ft)	35	Residential
54	Alembic Cloud Forest Tower C		Whitefield	105.7 metres (347 ft)	35	Residential
57	Birla Ojasvi Tower 1		Rajarajeshwarinagar	105.4 metres (346 ft)	34	Residential
58	Shapoorji Pallonji Park West Ceder		Binnipete	105 metres (344 ft)	32	Residential
59	Birla Ojasvi Tower 2		Rajarajeshwarinagar	104.5 metres (343 ft)	33	Residential
60	Nambiar District 25 Tower 3		Dommasandra	104.1 metres (342 ft)	34	Residential
60	Nambiar District 25 Tower 4		Dommasandra	104.1 metres (342 ft)	34	Residential
60	Nambiar District 25 Tower 5		Dommasandra	104.1 metres (342 ft)	34	Residential
60	Nambiar District 25 Tower 6		Dommasandra	104.1 metres (342 ft)	34	Residential
64	Nambiar District 25 Tower 7		Dommasandra	103.8 metres (341 ft)	35	Residential
64	Nambiar District 25 Tower 8		Dommasandra	103.8 metres (341 ft)	35	Residential
64	Nambiar District 25 Tower 9		Dommasandra	103.8 metres (341 ft)	35	Residential
64	Nambiar District 25 Tower 10		Dommasandra	103.8 metres (341 ft)	35	Residential
64	Nambiar District 25 Tower 11		Dommasandra	103.8 metres (341 ft)	35	Residential
64	Nambiar District 25 Tower 12		Dommasandra	103.8 metres (341 ft)	35	Residential
70	Birla Ojasvi Tower 3		Rajarajeshwarinagar	101.5 metres (333 ft)	32	Residential
71	Prestige Park Grove Tower 4		Kadugodi	101.1 metres (332 ft)	33	Residential
71	Prestige Park Grove Tower 8		Kadugodi	101.1 metres (332 ft)	33	Residential
71	Prestige Park Grove Tower 10		Kadugodi	101.1 metres (332 ft)	33	Residential
71	Prestige Park Grove Tower 13		Kadugodi	101.1 metres (332 ft)	33	Residential
71	Prestige Lavender Field Tower 3		Varthur	101.1 metres (332 ft)	33	Residential
71	Prestige Lavender Field Tower 4		Varthur	101.1 metres (332 ft)	33	Residential
71	Prestige Lavender Field Tower 5		Varthur	101.1 metres (332 ft)	33	Residential
71	Prestige Lavender Field Tower 6		Varthur	101.1 metres (332 ft)	33	Residential
79	Nambiar District 25 Tower 1		Dommasandra	101.05 metres (332 ft)	33	Residential
79	Nambiar District 25 Tower 2		Dommasandra	101.05 metres (332 ft)	33	Residential
81	GM Infinity - The 100 percent life (Tower B)		Bommasandra	100 metres (328 ft)	31	Residential
81	GM Infinity - The 100 percent life (Tower C)		Bommasandra	100 metres (328 ft)	31	Residential
81	Phoenix One Bangalore West 8		Rajajinagar	100 metres (328 ft)	30	Residential
81	Phoenix One Bangalore West 9		Rajajinagar	100 metres (328 ft)	30	Residential
85	Purva Bluebelle Tower B		Kempapura Agrahara	99.7 metres (327 ft)	33	Residential
86	Prestige Lavender Field Tower 1		Varthur	98.05 metres (322 ft)	32	Residential
86	Prestige Lavender Field Tower 2		Varthur	98.05 metres (322 ft)	32	Residential
88	Purva Bluebelle Tower A		Kempapura Agrahara	96.7 metres (317 ft)	32	Residential
89	Prestige Park Grove Tower 3		Kadugodi	91.95 metres (302 ft)	30	Residential
89	Prestige Park Grove Tower 9		Kadugodi	91.95 metres (302 ft)	30	Residential
89	Prestige Park Grove Tower 14		Kadugodi	91.95 metres (302 ft)	30	Residential
89	Prestige Park Grove Tower 19		Kadugodi	91.95 metres (302 ft)	30	Residential
93	Sattva Trinity Tower 1		Rajarajeshwarinagar	???	G+36	Residential
93	Sattva Trinity Tower 2		Rajarajeshwarinagar	???	G+36	Residential
93	Sattva Trinity Tower 3		Rajarajeshwarinagar	???	G+36	Residential

== Approved, proposed, and on hold ==
This list ranks buildings that are approved, on hold, or proposed and are planned to be at least 30 floors tall.

Rank	Name	Height	Floors	Status
1				
2	Asta Vibrant Towers	390 metres (1,280 ft)	90	approved
3	KRTE AFRD Tower	300 metres (984 ft)	94	approved
4	Golden Empire	288 metres (945 ft)	68	approved
5	Karnataka Financial Towers	245 metres (804 ft)	57	proposed
6	Sobha World City (18 towers)	175 metres (574 ft)	3B+G+54	proposed
7	The Bangalore i360 (Free standing structure)	175 metres (574 ft)	50	proposed
8	Bangalore 47	165 metres (541 ft)	47	approved
9	Karnataka Twin Towers	N/A	50	approved

== Timeline of tallest buildings of Bangalore ==
Name	Image	Height	Floors	Years as tallest
Public Utility Building		106 metres (348 ft)	25	35 (1973–2008)
UB Tower		123 metres (404 ft)	20	2 (2008–2010)
World Trade Center Bangalore		128 metres (420 ft)	32	3 (2010–2013)
Mantri DSK Pinnacle		153 metres (502 ft)	46	10 (2013–2023)
CNTC Presidential Tower		161 metres (528 ft)	50	2 (2023–present)

== See also ==
- List of tallest buildings in India
- List of tallest buildings in Mangalore
- List of tallest buildings in Hyderabad
- List of tallest structures in India
- List of tallest buildings in Asia
- List of tallest buildings in different cities in India
