= 100 Feet Road, Bengaluru =

Road in Bangalore, India

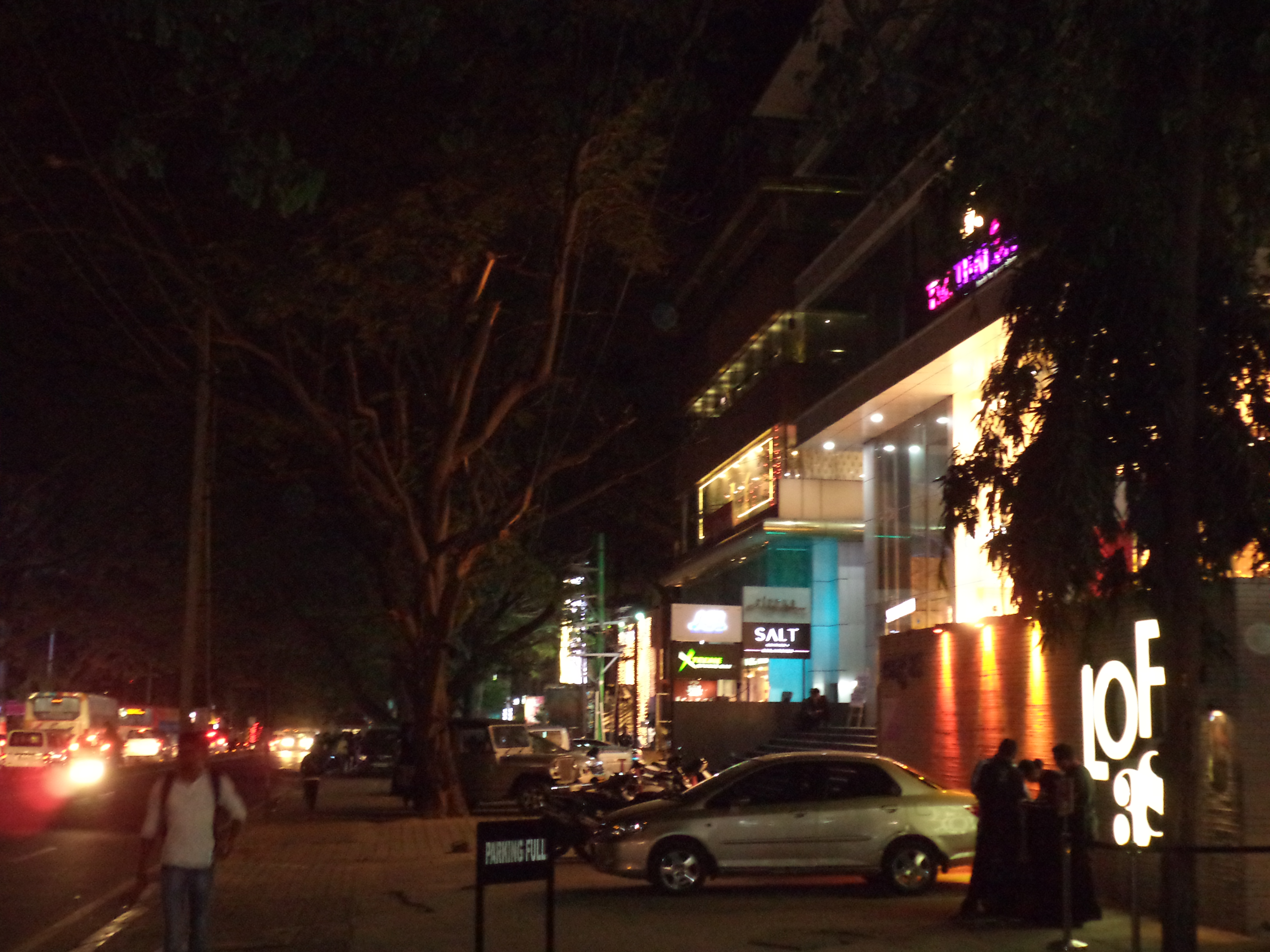
Hundred Feet Road by night

Dr S. K. Karim Khan Road, commonly known as 100 Feet Road Indira Nagar. It is a road in the Indian city of Bangalore that links Old Madras Road with Old Airport Road.

100 Feet Road passes through four distinct sections within Indiranagar. Starting from Old Madras Road, 100 Feet Road passes through Indira Nagar 1st Stage, Indiranagar 2nd Stage, then the posh Defence Colony and finally HAL 2nd Stage ending up at the Domlur Flyover connecting to Old Airport Road. The 100 Feet Road Section in Defence Colony was first built in the 1960s by the Mysore Sub-Area Officers Housing Colony, Binnamangla which is known as posh Defence Colony. The Defence Colony section on both the east and west side of 100 Feet Road has biggest size plots measuring up to a maximum of 80 feet (24 m) by 110 feet (34 m). In the 1970s after the formation of the Indira Nagar layout by BDA, sections of the 100 Feet Road were built to connect HAL 2nd Stage, Indira Nagar 1st and 2nd Stage to Defence Colony. Starting in the 1990s till present day, almost all of the residential plots on 100 Feet Road have become commercial giving 100 Feet Road a distinct signature for food and shopping in Bangalore.

In 2014 it was named Dr S. K. Karim Khan Road after the renowned Kannada Poet and folklorist. 100 Feet Road is a residential and commercial hub with the major Old Airport Road – Intermediate Ring Road flyover junction at one end.

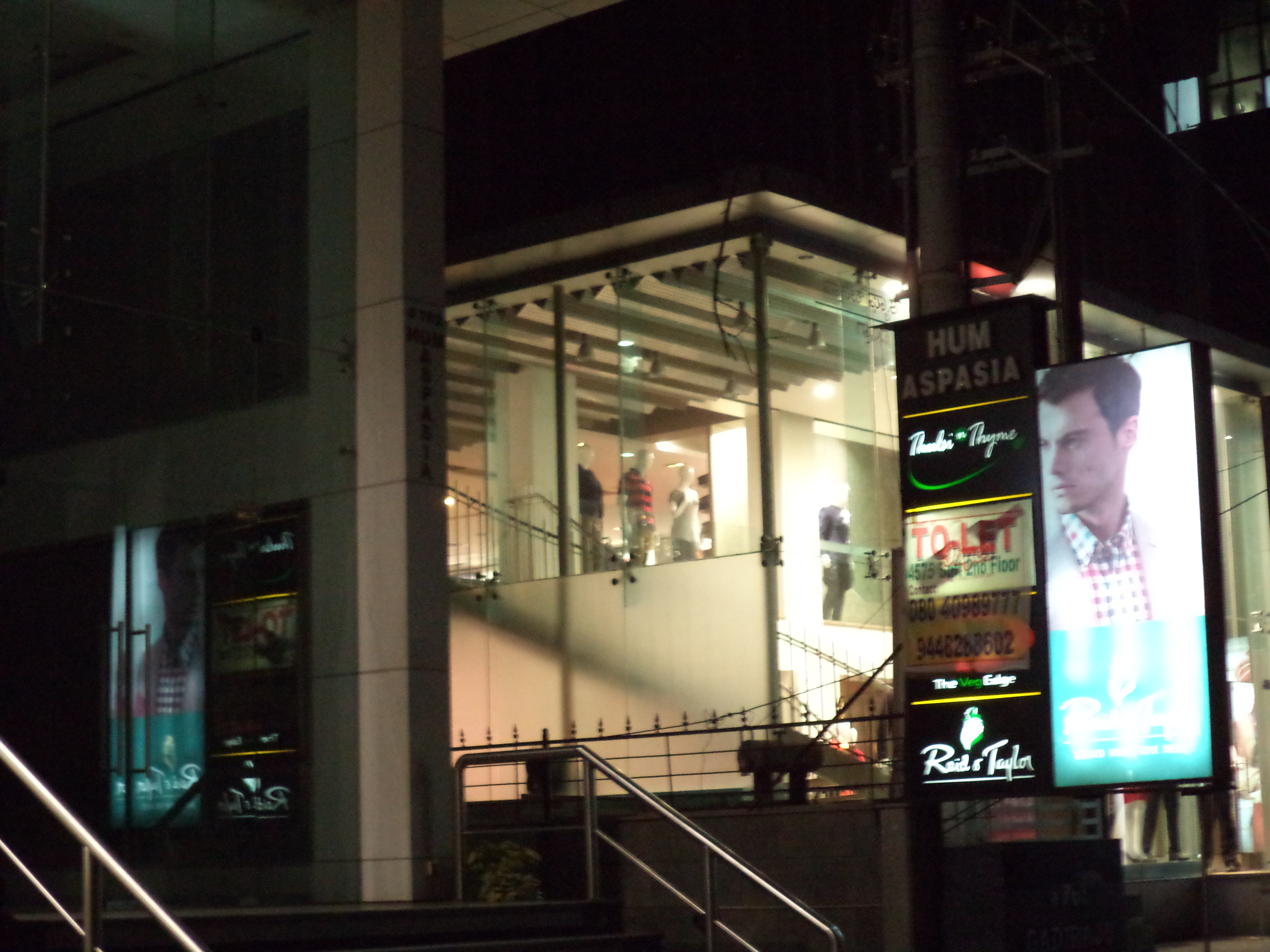
Store located on Hundred Feet Road, by night

Once lined with residential houses on either side, 100 Feet Road has, over the last few years, turned into a commercially important high-street in Bangalore with numerous retail stores, book shops, ayurvedic centers, hotels restaurants, cafes, pubs and bars. While Bangalore has always been known as the "Pub City" of India, this was largely due to the number of pubs around M. G. Road. Indiranagar and more specifically 100 Feet Road is slowly wresting this importance away.

Indiranagar 100 Feet Road, over the years has turned into India's top food beverage hub, setting behind, the Park Street in Kolkata and Hauz Khas in Delhi.
