= Kadugodi =

Kādugodi Kādugudi
- Neighbourhood
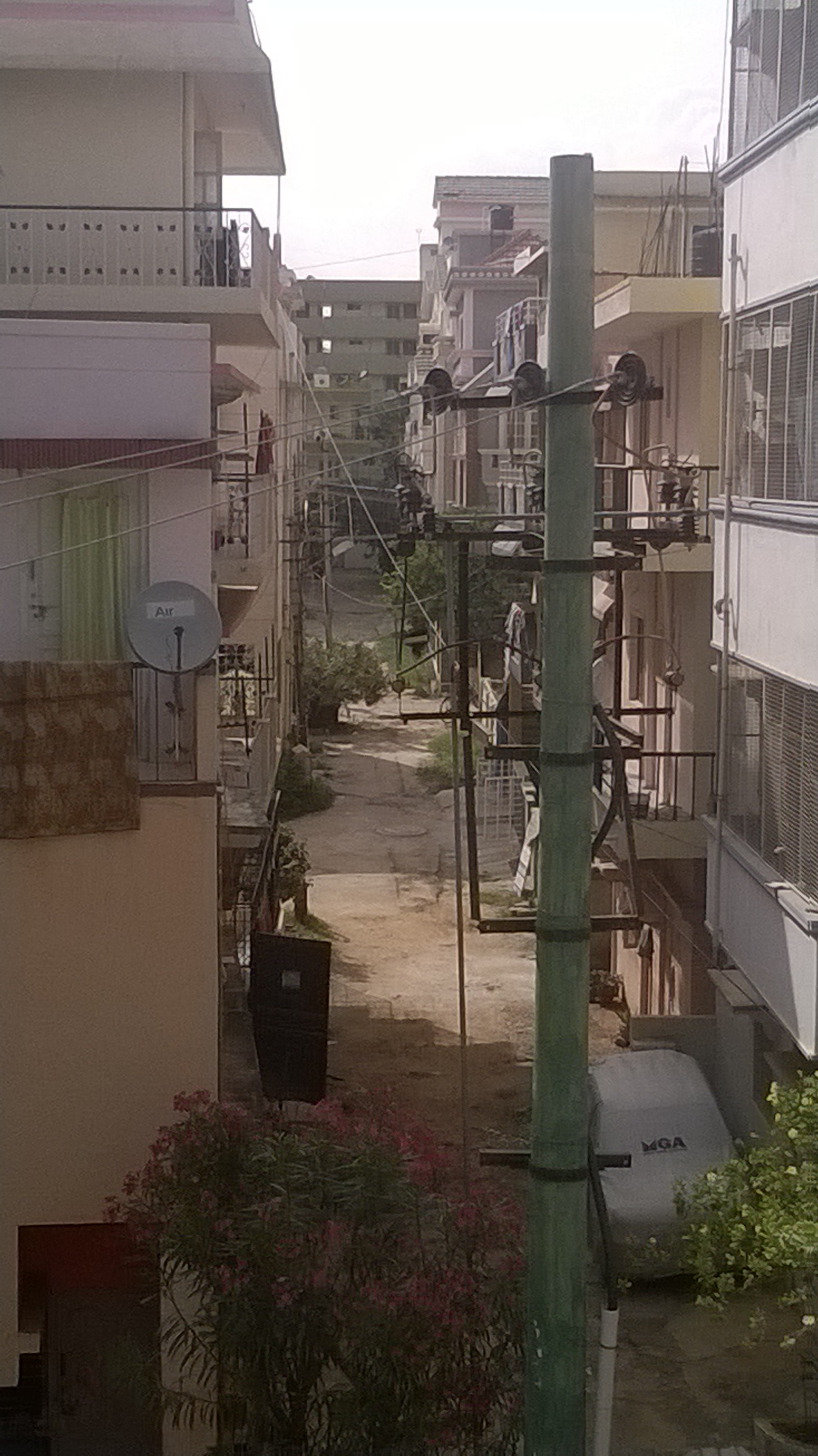
- A street in Kadugodi

- Location within Bengaluru
- Coordinates: 12.9985767°N 77.7609716°E
- Country: India
- State: Karnataka
- District: Bangalore Urban
- Metro: Bangalore
- Zone: Whitefield
- Ward: 83
- Established: 1798

Government
  - Type: Municipal Corporation
  - Body: BBMP

Languages
  - Official: Kannada
- Time zone: UTC+5:30 (IST)
- Postal Index Number: 560067
- Area code: +91-(0)80
- Vehicle registration: KA-53

Kādugodi (originally called Kādugudi) is a suburb located in Whitefield, Bangalore in the state of Karnataka, India. The area is said to have been founded over 1000 years ago by the Chola dynasty.

== Etymology ==
Deciphering the name kadugudi: Kadugudi is a combination of two words kadu and gudi. Looking into the Kannada grammar we understand that, when two words are joined, the first letter of the second word transforms into the next consonant. Hence Kadu+Gudi (ಕಾಡು+ಗುಡಿ) becomes Kadugudi (ಕಾಡುಗುಡಿ). Gudi means temple in Kannada The earliest evidence of Kadugodi's existence comes from a 1030 AD inscription during the rule of emperor Rajendra Chola I.A, that is still present in Kashi Vishveshwar Swamy Temple, Kadugudi Village. The words `Kadu' and `Gudi' refers to a temple in the forest. Land for the Shiva temple, locally referred to as the Kashi Vishveshwar Temple, was donated by the Cholas. However, its vaastu and architecture have a strong resemblance to the Ganga dynasty, which preceded the Cholas. Inscriptions on the basement of the temple also refer to the deity as Rajadhi Raja Bhangisvaram. The original Shiva Linga mentioned in these inscriptions was stolen and replaced by a new one brought from Varanasi.

== Climate ==
Kadugodi is known for its pleasant climate throughout the year. Its elevation is the highest among the major large cities.

Kadugodi has a tropical savanna climate (Köppen climate classification Aw) with distinct wet and dry seasons. Due to its high elevation, Kadugodi usually enjoys a more moderate climate throughout the year. The coolest month is December with an average low temperature of 17.4 °C (63.3 °F) and the hottest month is April with an average high temperature of 36 °C (97 °F). The highest temperature ever recorded in Kadugudi is 36.8 °C (98.2 °F) (recorded in March 2012). However, the suburbs of Kadugudi recorded temperatures as high as 39 °C (102 °F). The lowest ever recorded is 9.8 °C (50 °F) (recorded in January 2013).

Winter temperatures rarely drop below 12 °C (54 °F), and summer temperatures seldom exceed 37 °C (99 °F). Kadugodi receives rainfall from both the northeast and the southwest monsoons and the wettest months are September, October and August, in that order. The summer heat is moderated by fairly frequent thunderstorms. The heaviest rainfall recorded in a 11-hour period in recorded on 7 October 2012, has real thick water resource which is hard water in nature.

== Infrastructure ==
Kadugodi has started seeing a residential construction, since the late 2000s and especially during 2010 and onwards. In the 1970s, Kadugodi saw its first extension towards the west as Village Panchayat extension simply referred to as new extension or VP extension. In the 1980s, it saw another extension in the eastern direction when a new extension was formed by free distribution of plots to economically deserving families. This was done by the Eashwara temple family and was named after Shree Shankar Dixit, this area is now popularly known as Shankara pura.

Going by the street names of Kadugudi one can deduce that this place must have been a well planned out settlement. There is a Kumbhara beedi (potter street), there is Ganigara beedi (vegetable oil extractors), Angadi beedi (Market street), Balajigara beedhi (mainly merchants dealing in bangles, flowers etc.)

== Neighborhood ==
The main neighborhoods in Kadugodi are Belathur, Seegehalli, Whitefield and Channasandra.

== Transport ==
Kadugodi is well connected to all parts of Bangalore by the road. The Hopefarm junction connects Kadugodi to the rest of the Bangalore city.

Kadugodi is easily accessible by the Bangalore Metropolitan Transport Corporation (BMTC) buses and all buses from Kempegowda Bus Station, K. R. Market and Shivajinagar towards HAL, Marathahalli, Varthur and Whitefield as well as Banashankari depart from Kadugodi.

The Namma Metro Station of Kadugodi is Whitefield (Kadugodi) metro station located opposite to Kadugodi BMTC Bus Station which was inaugurated by Honourable Prime Minister of India Shri Narendra Modi on 25 March 2023.

Whitefield Railway Station is one of the oldest railway stations in the Bangalore. It lies on the Bangalore-Chennai route and is double and electrifie; the Krishnarajapuram-Whitefield section is slated to be converted to a quadruple line. The station is slated to become a junction with a Whitefield-Kolar (53 km; 33 miles) line being laid. Whitefield railway station has four platforms, each running to 650m in length, shelters, lighting, benches and a booking office. Rails run here throughout the Day and Night from Whitefield Railway Station to Marikuppam, Kanniyakumari, Tirupati, Kolar, Jolarpettai, Bangarapet, Kuppam, as well as Krishnarajapuram, Bangalore Cantonment and Bangalore City Junction

== Places of Worship ==
Sri Sathya Sai Baba founded his Ashram "Brindavan" on 25 June 1960 with colleges and hospital here as later addition. It is a spiritual ashram and is a travellers destination for thousands from India and overseas.

Kadugodi has many temples and the oldest among them are Anjaneya temple, Kashi Vishwanatha temple, Ganesh temple, Eashwara temple and the grama devata temples of Maramma and Ganga Parameshwari. All these temples are located in Old Kadugodi area starting from Bapuji Circle up to Kashi Vishwanatha temple.

Kadugodi also has some of the oldest mosques, among them is Hajee Sir Ismailsait Mosque. It has been said that it was built by Hajee Ismailsait, in the 1900s. Considering how old it is, it's named as Badi Majeed. It's also one of the most visited places in Kadugodi.

Kadugodi also has Our Lady of Lourdes Church.

== Festivals ==
Two major festivities of Kadugodi is Rathotsava (Charriot festival) that is conducted for the Eashwara and Rama deities. Lot of festivities are conducted before and after the actual Rathotsava day.

== Geographic location ==
Whitefield Metro has come up which runs up to Krishnarajapura railway station which is now connected to purple line at Byappanahalli.

== Gallery ==
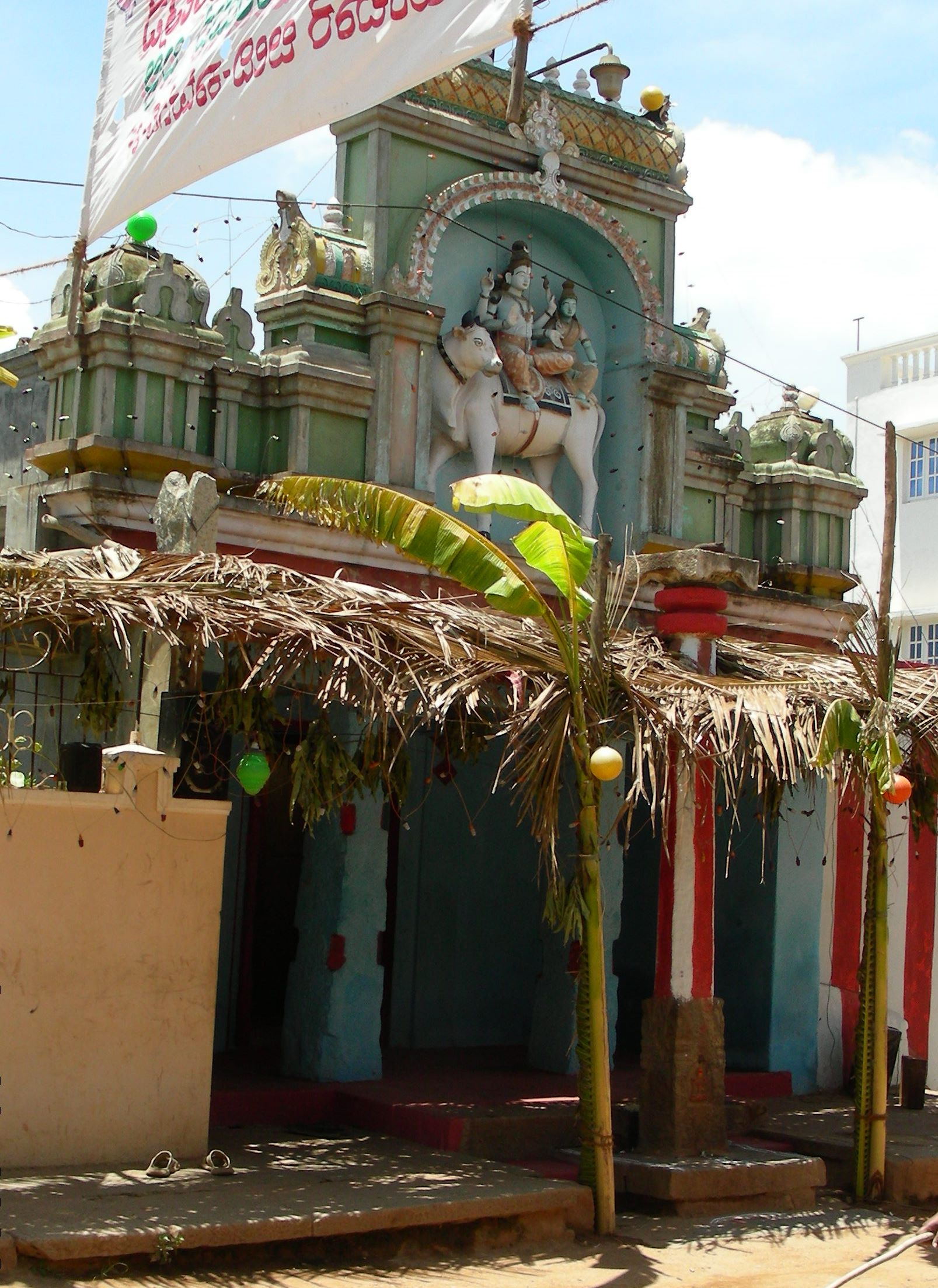
The Eashwara Temple

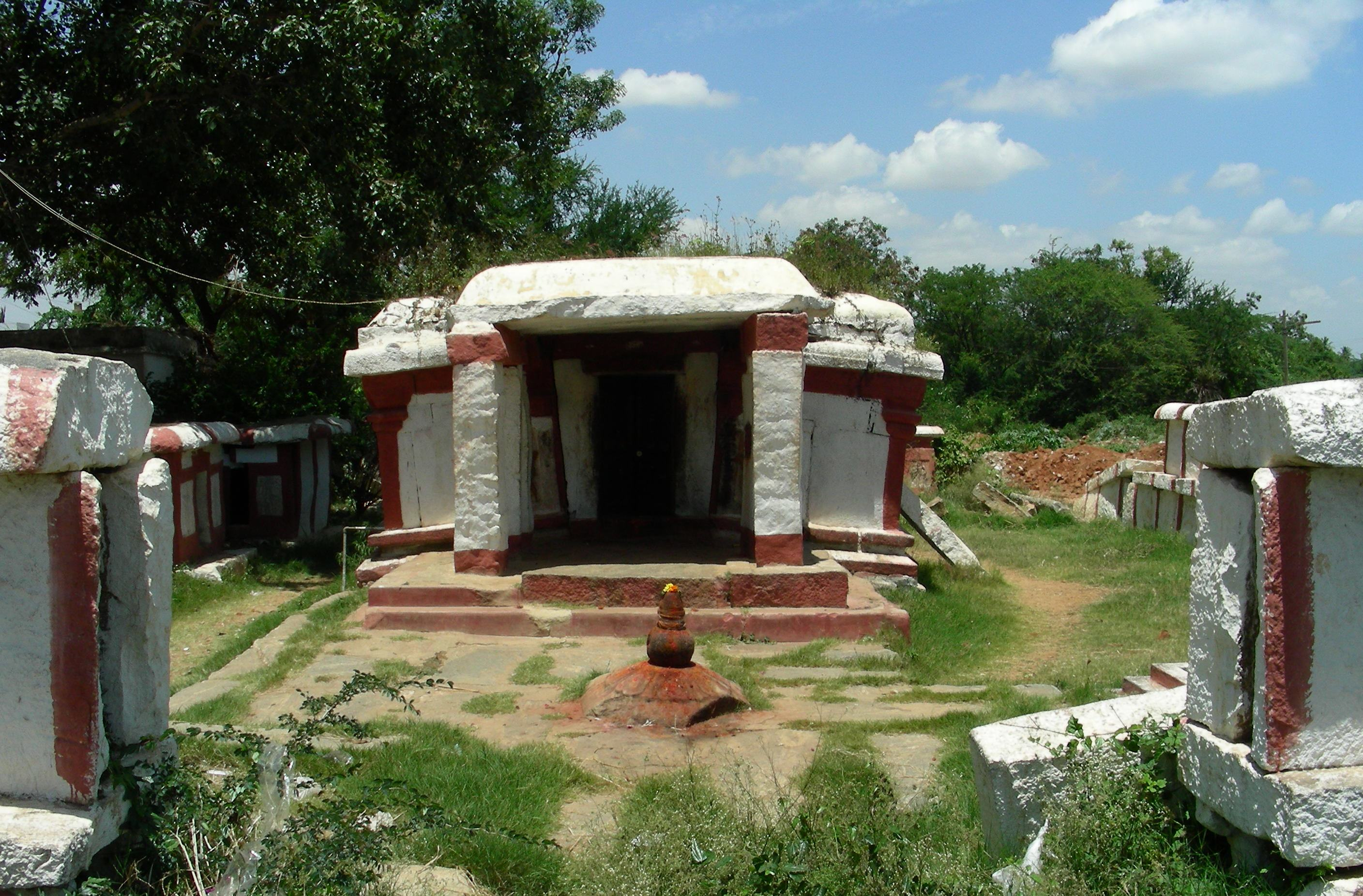
The Kashi Vishwanatha Temple

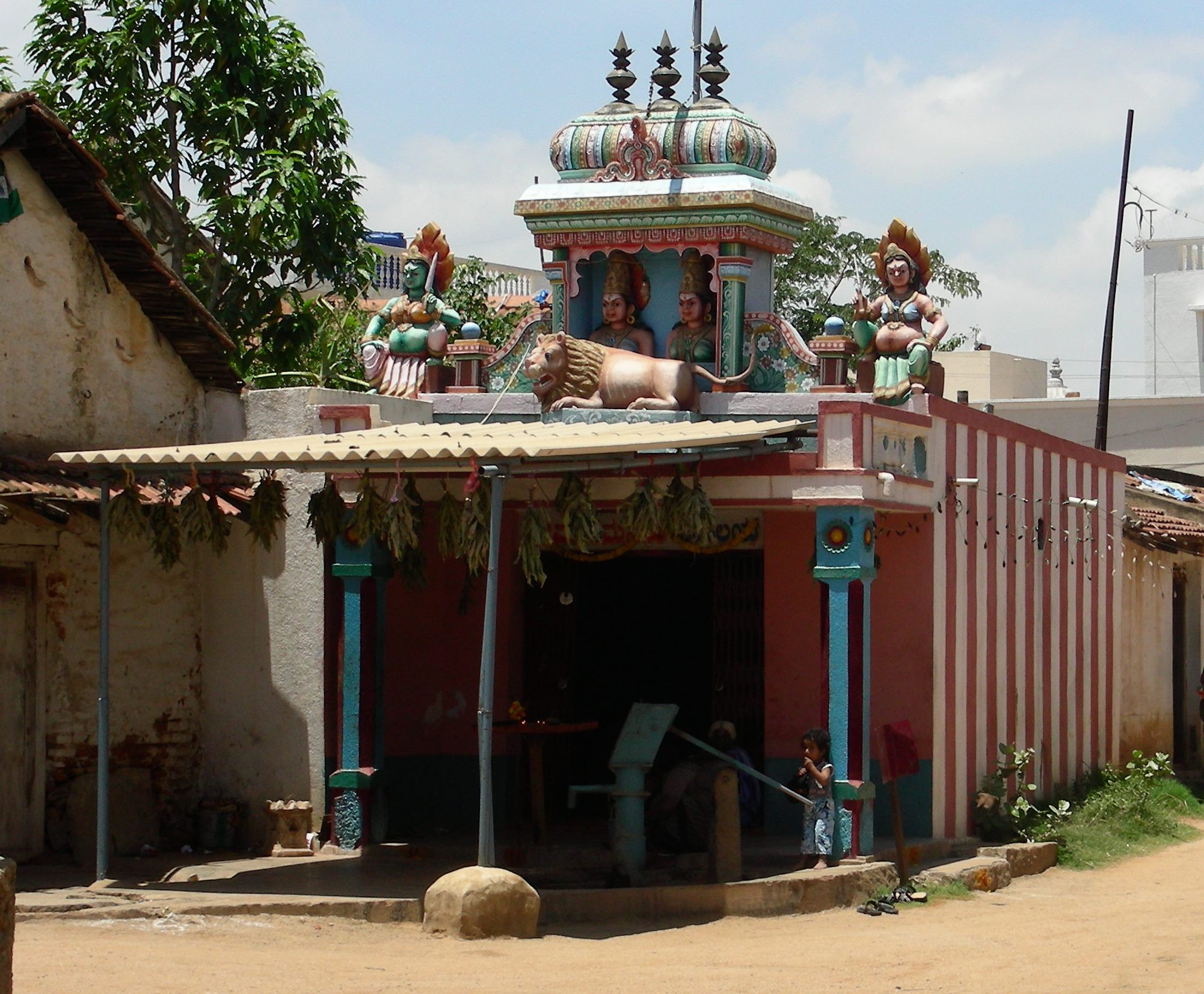
The Grama Devata Temple of Maramma

== See also ==
- Institute of Wood Science and Technology
- Nandi Hills, India
- UB City
- National Military Memorial
