= Visvesvaraya Centre =

Famous brutalist building

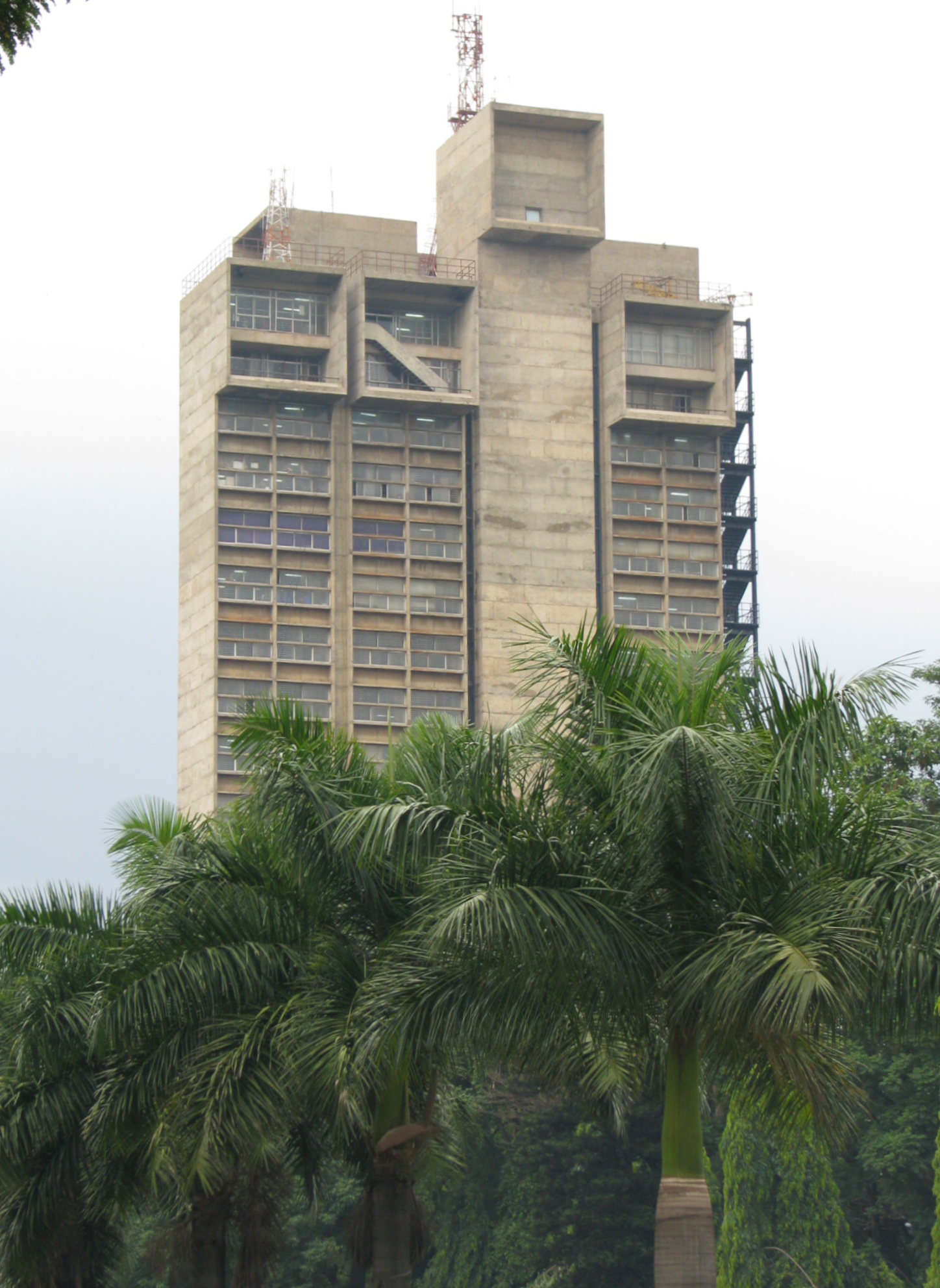
- Visvesvaraya Centre as seen from the South-West, on B. R. Ambedkar Veedhi
- Interactive map of the Visvesvaraya Centre area
- Alternative names: Visvesvaraya Towers, VV Towers

General information
- Architectural style: Brutalist
- Coordinates: 12.982425°N 77.595785°E
- Completed: 1983
- Owner: Government of Karnataka

Height
- Height: 85 m (279 ft)

Technical details
- Material: Concrete
- Floor count: 21

Design and construction
- Architect: Charles Correa

Other information
- Public transit access: Cubbon Park metro station

The Visvesvaraya Centre (better known as Visvesvaraya Towers) is a government office complex in Bangalore. The complex was built on the site of the former house of Sir M. Visvesvaraya, after his death, and gets its name from him. Initially constructed for the Life Insurance Corporation, it was later bought by the state government to house government offices.

== Design ==
The complex was designed by Charles Correa. It features two prominent concrete towers of 22 stories (southern) and 12 stories (northern), connected by a three story podium block. The podium features open air stairs, and was designed to be a public meeting space, with its multi-level roofs functioning as a courtyard. The eastern section of the podium houses a canteen, where the employees in the building have lunch. B. R. Ambedkar Veedhi, Rajbhavan Road and Infantry Road bound the complex on the western, southern and northern sides. In 2021, the Directorate of Urban Land Transport proposed the construction of a public plaza in the southwest corner of the plot, called VV Towers Plaza, facing Police Thimmaiah Circle. The plaza was completed by Karnataka Rural Infrastructure Development Corporation in 2023, however it was not opened to the public. The plaza featured a public seating area, sculptures and bicycle parking.

== Legacy ==
The towers were constructed in the 1980s, when the Bangalore Urban Art Commission (BUAC), inspired by the City Beautiful movement, insisted on low rise and neoclassical buildings. The brutalist architecture of the towers and the high rise structures stood in sharp contrast to the neoclassical architecture of Vidhana Soudha, Attara Kacheri and the General Post Office. The BUAC considered the buildings an eyesore. The towers also represented a shift in the city's expansion, from urban sprawl to high rise towers, following the lead of the Public Utility Building. In 2001 the BUAC, ironically housed in the towers, was disbanded.

The towers are considered important as they are one of Charles Correa's first major projects in the country.

== Present status ==
The complex is home to various state government departments. The general public is not allowed into the premises, unless they have an appointment at one of the offices.

== Gallery ==
Visvesvaraya Centre
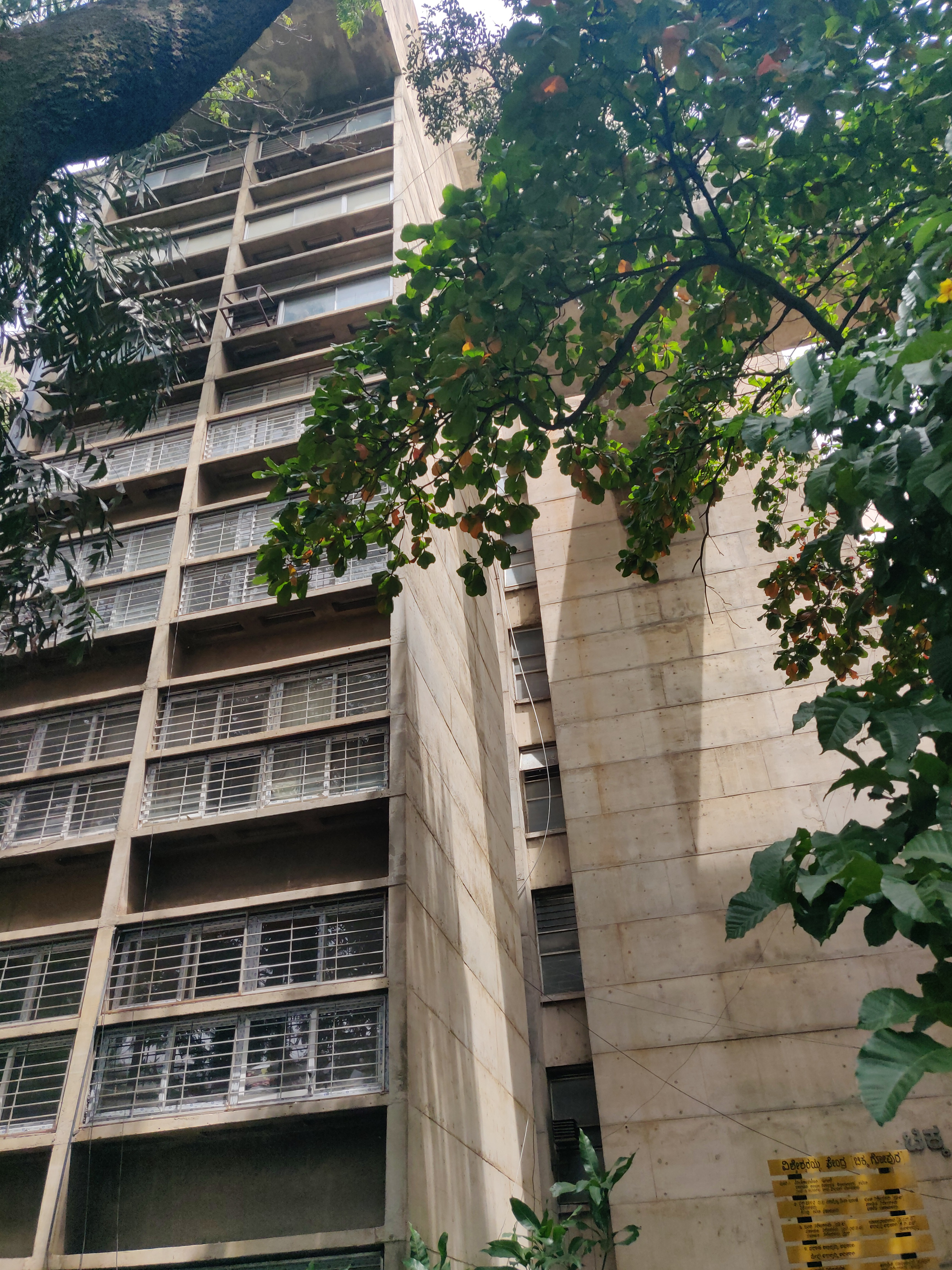
The western face of the shorter of the two towers in Visvesvaraya Centre, as seen from the adjacent sidewalk on B. R. Ambedkar Veedhi.

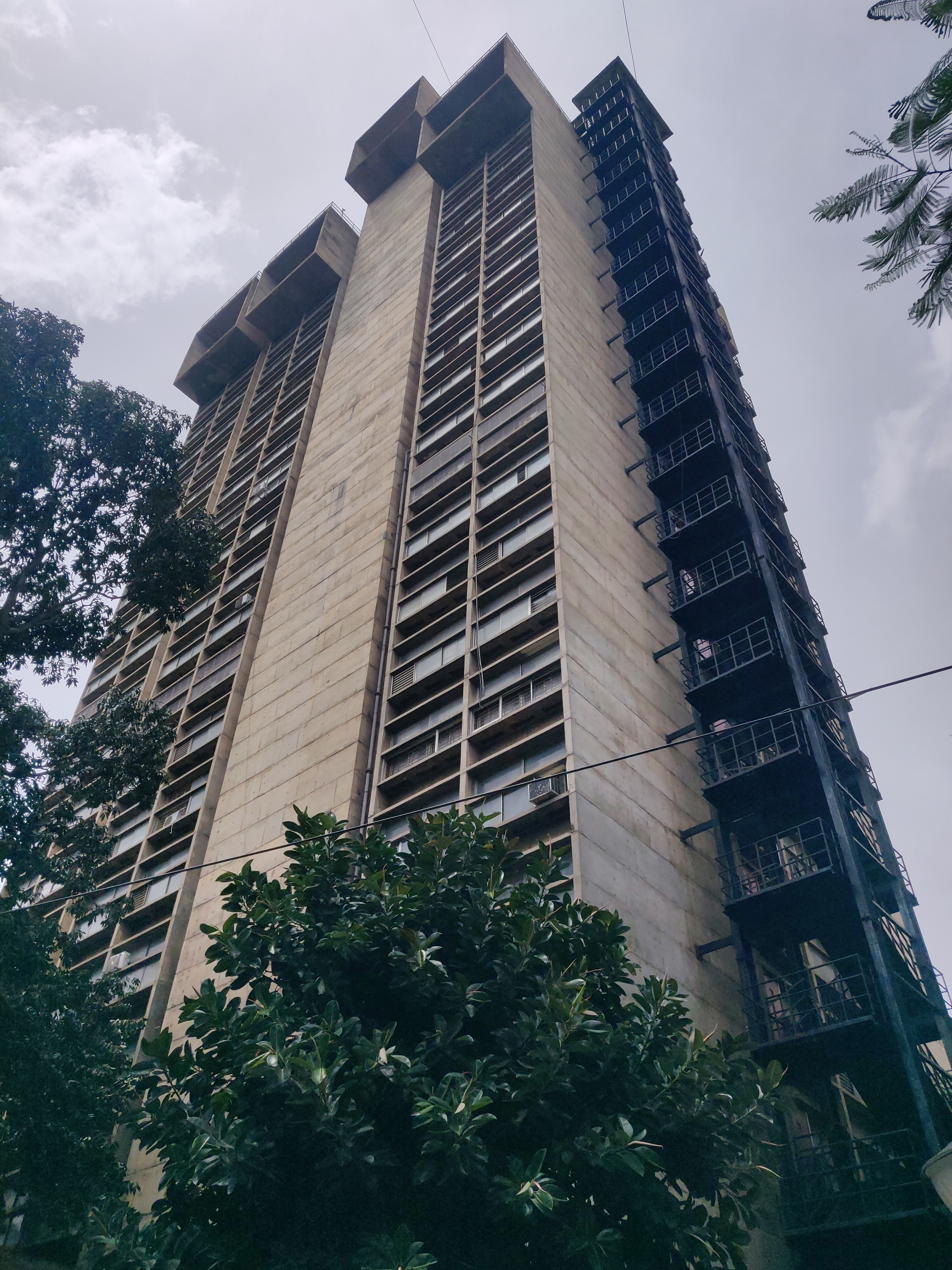
The southern face of the taller of two towers, as seen from the sidewalk on Raj Bhavan Road.

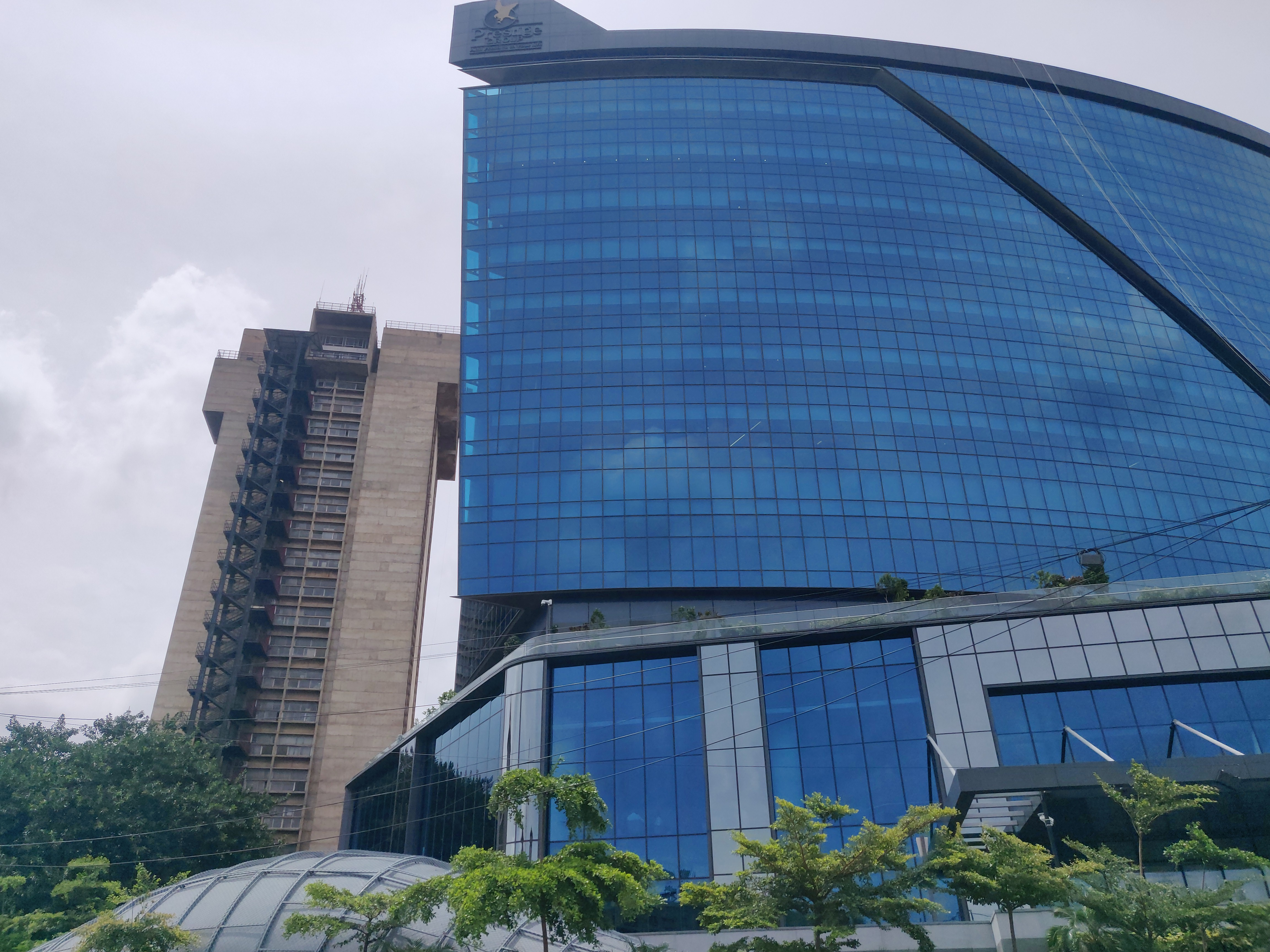
Visvevaraya Towers with Prestige Minsk Square, as seen from the Minsk Square plaza

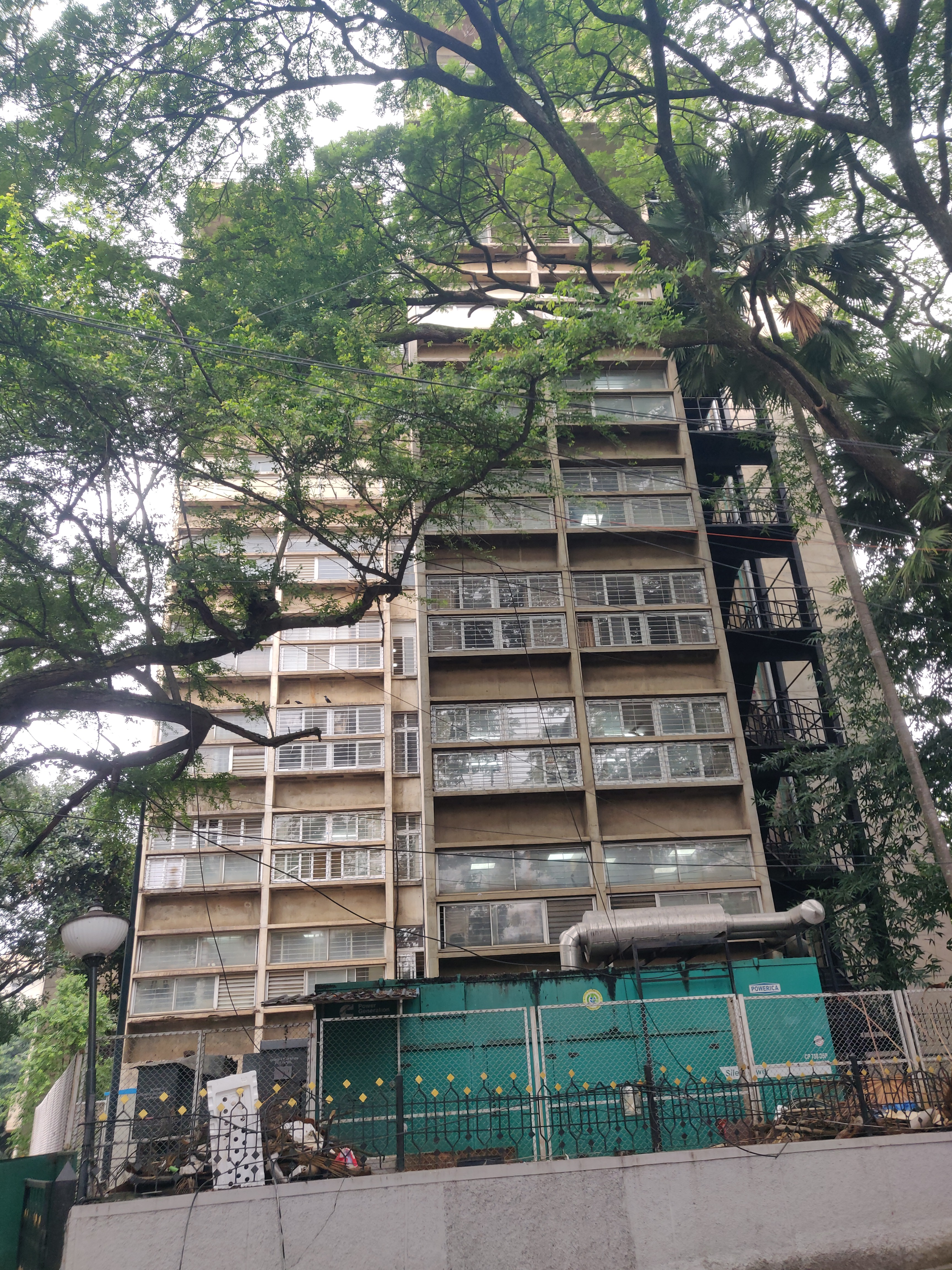
The northern face as seen from Infantry Road.
