= Intermediate Ring Road =

Intermediate Ring Road, Bengaluru

Route information
- Maintained by Bengaluru Metropolitan Regional Development Authority (BMRDA)
- Length: 210 km (130 mi)

The Intermediate Ring Road (IRR) is a proposed 210-kilometre-long (130 mi) orbital road corridor in the Bengaluru Metropolitan Region of Karnataka, India. Proposed by the Bengaluru Metropolitan Regional Development Authority (BMRDA), the infrastructure project is designed to connect 12 key satellite towns and emerging growth centres on the outskirts of Bengaluru. The IRR is planned to serve as a critical mobility ring situated between the city's Peripheral Ring Road and the larger Satellite Town Ring Road (STRR).

The project is distinct from the Inner Ring Road connecting Domlur to Ejipura, which is also colloquially referred to as the intermediate ring road. The primary objective of the regional IRR is to mitigate traffic congestion within the core of Bengaluru by diverting transit traffic and to stimulate economic development in suburban areas.

== History ==
=== Initial Proposal and Delays ===
The IRR project was initially conceptualized and officially notified in 2007, envisioning a 90-metre-wide corridor to support future traffic volumes. However, the project remained stagnant for nearly two decades due to sustained legal disputes concerning the proposed alignment and significant land acquisition challenges. In August 2022, following prolonged litigation, the Karnataka High Court directed the state government to take a final decision and revise the road's alignment.

=== 2023 Revision ===
In March 2023, the BMRDA introduced a revised plan, known as IRR-2023. This new alignment proposed utilizing existing Public Works Department (PWD) roads instead of acquiring new land. This approach resulted in inconsistent corridor widths ranging from 9 to 30 metres, substantially narrower than the originally planned 90-metre specification. Furthermore, the 2023 plan encountered financial and practical constraints; dense urban developments and approved layouts had already been established along the revised route, presenting significant compensation costs and integration conflicts with existing state highways and major district roads.

=== 2026 Revival of Original Alignment ===
In early 2026, the Government of Karnataka officially scrapped the 2023 revision and reinstated the original 2007 alignment with limited, targeted modifications. The decision was predicated on the fact that the 2007 alignment had already been integrated into the master plans of multiple local planning authorities over the years, thereby mitigating potential conflicts and reducing acquisition uncertainties for landowners.

The modifications to the 2007 plan were primarily localized to specific junctions, including adjustments where the IRR intersects with the Nelamangala Town Ring Road and where it merges with the Satellite Town Ring Road (STRR) towards the Anekal-Hoskote stretch.

== Route and Connectivity ==
The 210-kilometre corridor forms a loop around Bengaluru, linking several industrial and residential hubs. The road is designed to interconnect 12 major satellite towns and rural nodes, including:

- Nelamangala
- Devanahalli
- Hoskote
- Anekal
- Bidadi
- Harohalli
- Thattekere (Kanakapura)
- Tavarekere
- Dommasandra
- Attibele

== Funding and Development Model ==
To circumvent the prohibitive costs and delays traditionally associated with large-scale land acquisition in the Bengaluru region, the BMRDA is implementing a land-pooling and self-funding strategy. By leveraging land already designated for infrastructure within established regional master plans, the authority aims to incentivize private developers to surrender land required for the road corridor in exchange for expedited project approvals. This approach is intended to minimize the expenditure of public funds and reduce the likelihood of protracted legal disputes.
