= Public Utility Building, Bengaluru =

Skyscraper in Bengaluru, India

Public Utility Building
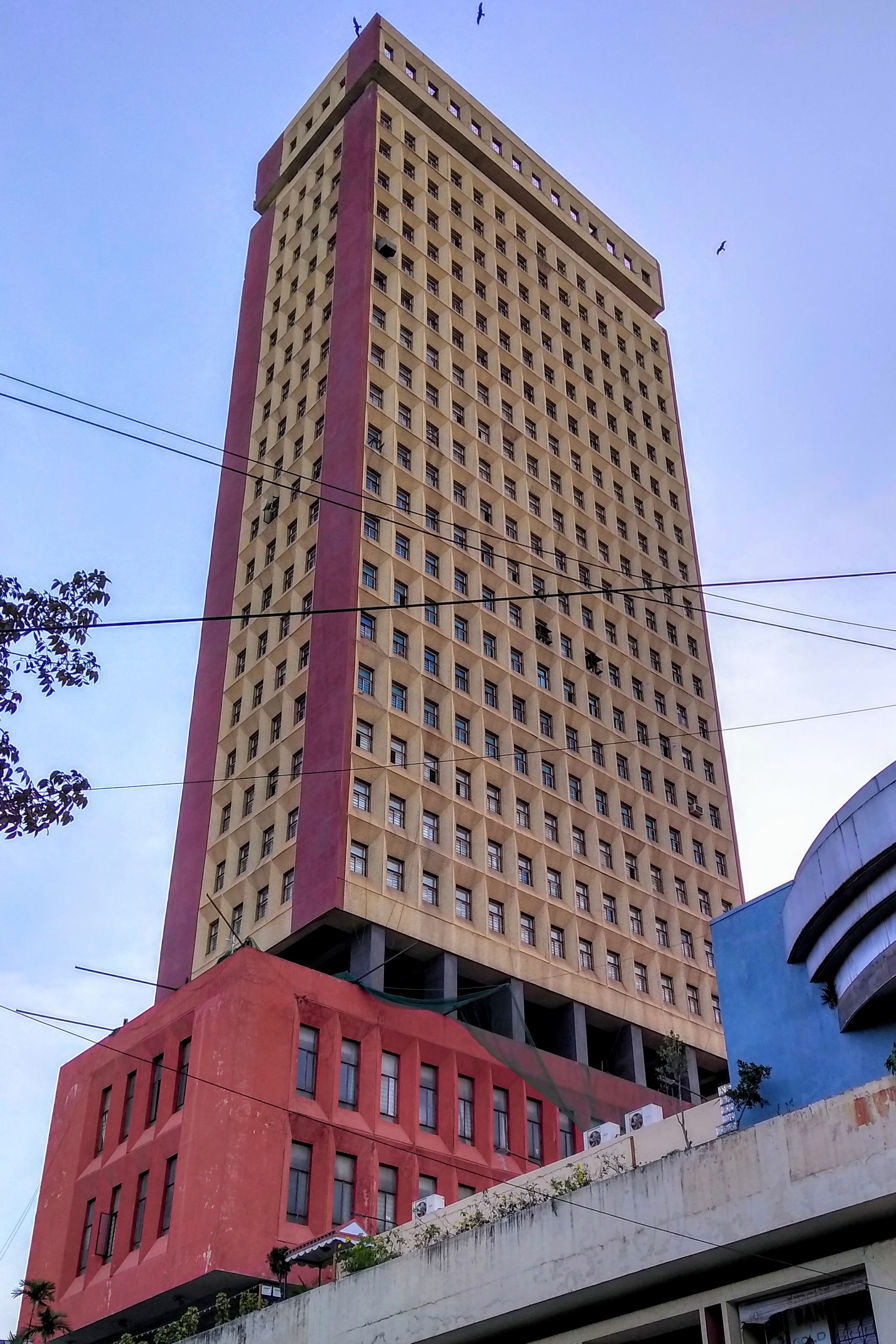
- The Public Utility Building on MG Road, a major commercial center in Bangalore

- Location within Bengaluru

General information
- Location: Bangalore, India, India
- Coordinates: 12°58′26.93″N 77°36′34.95″E
- Landlord: Bruhat Bengaluru Mahanagara Palike

Height
- Height: 106 m (348 ft)

Technical details
- Floor count: 25

Design and construction
- Architect: Atul Sharma
- Structural engineer: Kamal N. Hadker

The Public Utility Building (also known as Subhash Chandra Bose Public Utility Building) is a skyscraper on Mahatma Gandhi Road, Bangalore, India. It is one of the tallest buildings and a major commercial center of Bangalore, housing a variety of businesses and commercial centers including offices, shops, boutiques, hotel, restaurants, and a cinema hall. Built in the 1970s by the Bangalore City Corporation, it has 25 stories and stands 106 metres (348 ft) tall. The architect of the building was Atul Sharma and the structural engineer was Kamal N Hadkar.

== See also ==
- List of tallest buildings in Bangalore
