= Aavalahalli =

- Neighbourhood
- Country: India
- State: Karnataka
- District: Bengaluru Urban
- Postal code: 560049

Aavalahalli is a residential locality in the north-eastern part of Bangalore, Karnataka.

== See also ==
- Krishnarajapuram
- Mahadevapura
