= Thanisandra =

Thanisandra Old forest
- area
- Country: India
- State: Karnataka
- District: Bangalore Urban
- Established: 09-11-1982

Government
  - Body: Bruhat Bengaluru Mahanagara Palike

Population (2024)
  - Total: 9,000

Languages
  - Official: [kannada]
- Time zone: UTC+5:30 (IST)
- PIN: 560077
- Nearest city: Bengaluru
- Lok Sabha constituency: Bangalore North
- Civic agency: Bruhat Bengaluru Mahanagara Palike

Thanisandra is a neighborhood located in the Northern part of Bangalore adjoining Hebbal, Nagawara and Kammanahalli and on the route to the Kempegowda International Airport.

Thanisandra is now part of Bangalore Mahanagara Palike and as the development of Bangalore city towards the new airport continues, many professionals have moved into the area, water supply as well as proper electrical facilities extend through the entire stretch on Thanisandra main road, though few of the bi-lanes are yet to receive water supply from the BWSSB. As of 2001 India census, Thanisandra had a population of 7557 with 3732 males and 3825 females.
