= Nagavara =

Nagawara
- Neighbourhood
- Country: India
- State: Karnataka
- District: Bangalore Urban
- City: Bangalore

Government
  - Type: Bruhat Bengaluru Mahanagara Palike
- Time zone: UTC+5:30 (IST)
- Postal code: 560045
- Vehicle registration: KA-03

Nagavara is a residential and commercial neighbourhood located in the northern part of Bangalore in Karnataka.

== See also ==
- Manyata Tech Park
- Hebbal
- Bangalore Urban district
