= UB City =

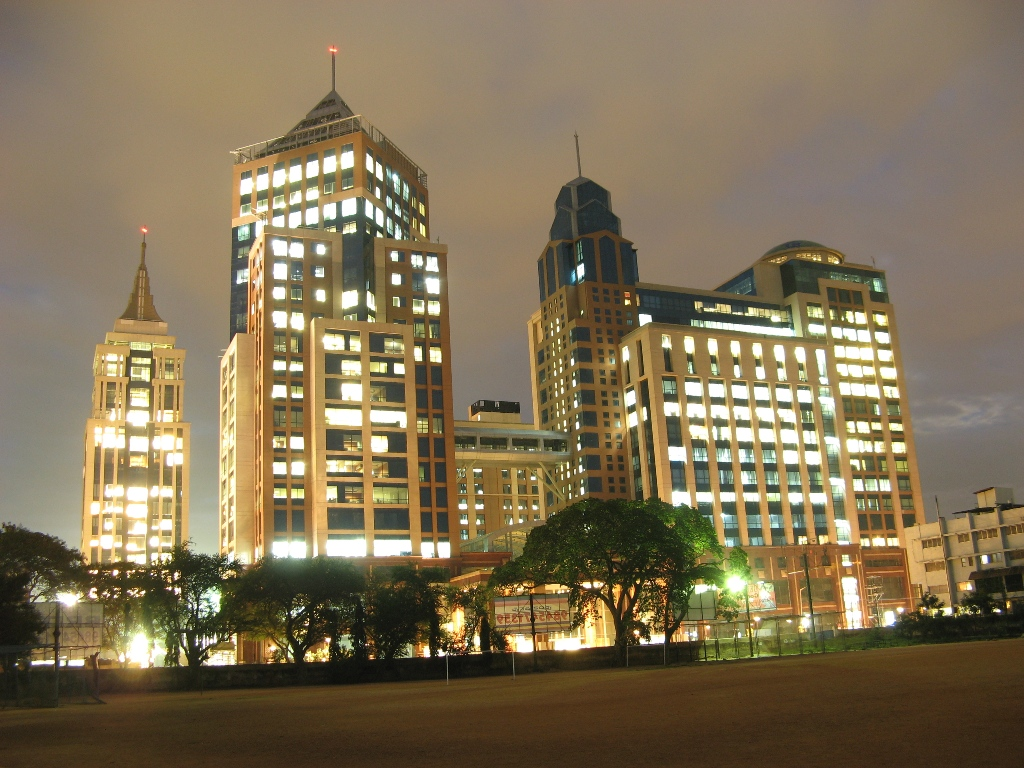

- Location within Karnataka

General information
- Type: Tower block
- Location: Bengaluru, Karnataka, India
- Coordinates: 12°58′18.30″N 77°35′45.00″E
- Construction started: 2004
- Completed: 2008
- Owner: Vijay Mallya
- Management: United Breweries

Height
- Roof: 123 m (404 ft) (UB Tower)

Technical details
- Floor count: 20 (UB Tower/Concorde)
- Floor area: 950,000 sq ft (88,000 m^{2})

Design and construction
- Architects: Thomas Associates, Bengaluru
- Main contractor: Prestige Group

UB City is a mixed-use high-rise complex in Bengaluru, India. It is a complex of 6 buildings with a total built up area of over 1.6 million sq ft. Established by the UB Group in a joint venture with Prestige Group, it is built on 13 acres (53,000 m^{2}) of land and hosts 1,000,000 sq ft (93,000 m^{2}) of high-end commercial, retail and service apartment space.

== Location ==
Centrally located in the Bengaluru Central Business District at the corner of Kasturba Road and Vittal Mallya Road, UB City is 1.8 km (1.1 mi) from the MG Road-Brigade Road junction and opposite Cubbon Park.

== Buildings ==
UB City has four towers. UB Tower houses corporate offices. It has an elevated rooftop helipad which provides a five-minute aerial commute to the Kempegowda International Airport. The Collection houses luxury brand stores.

== Gallery ==
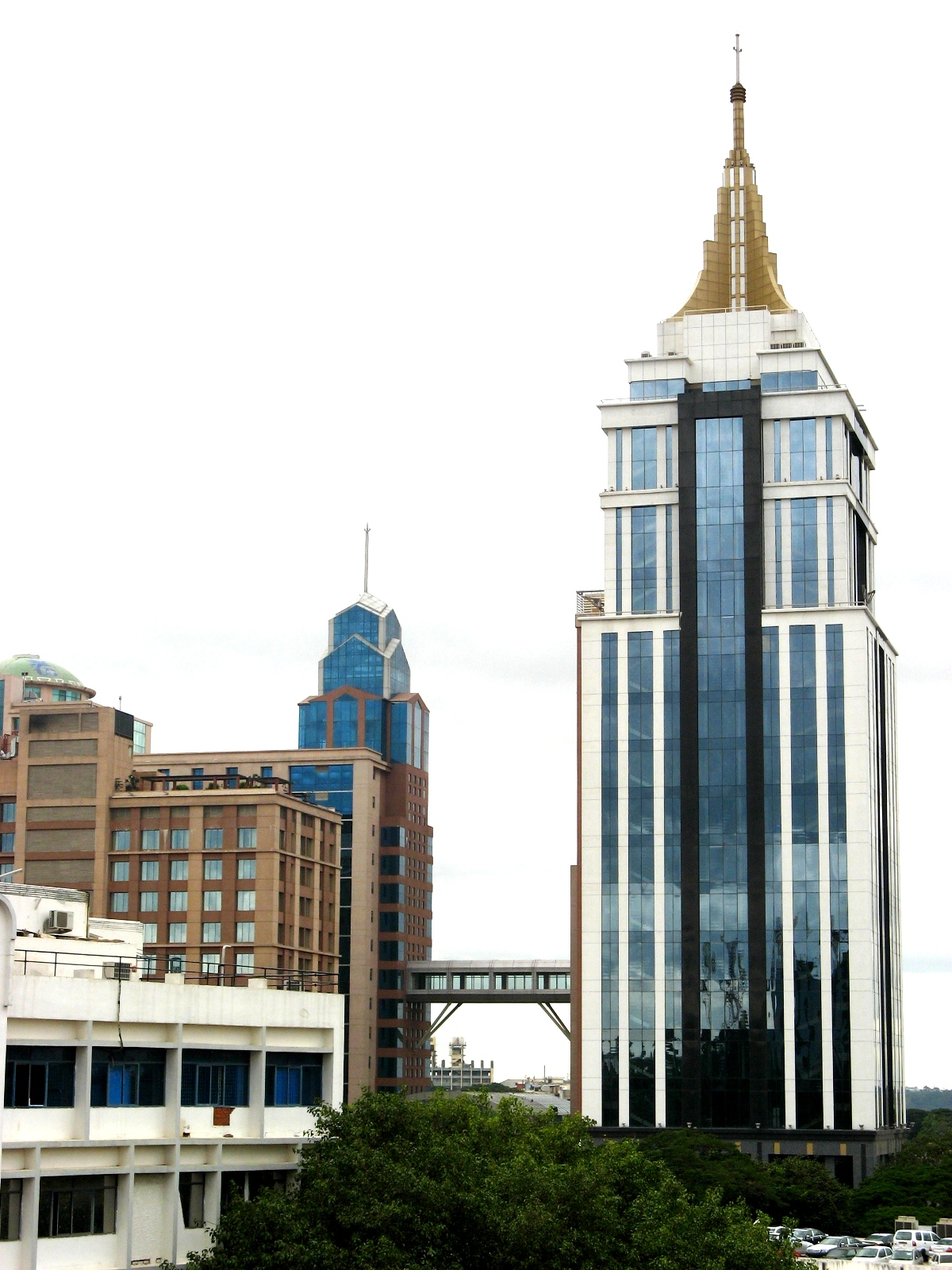
UB City

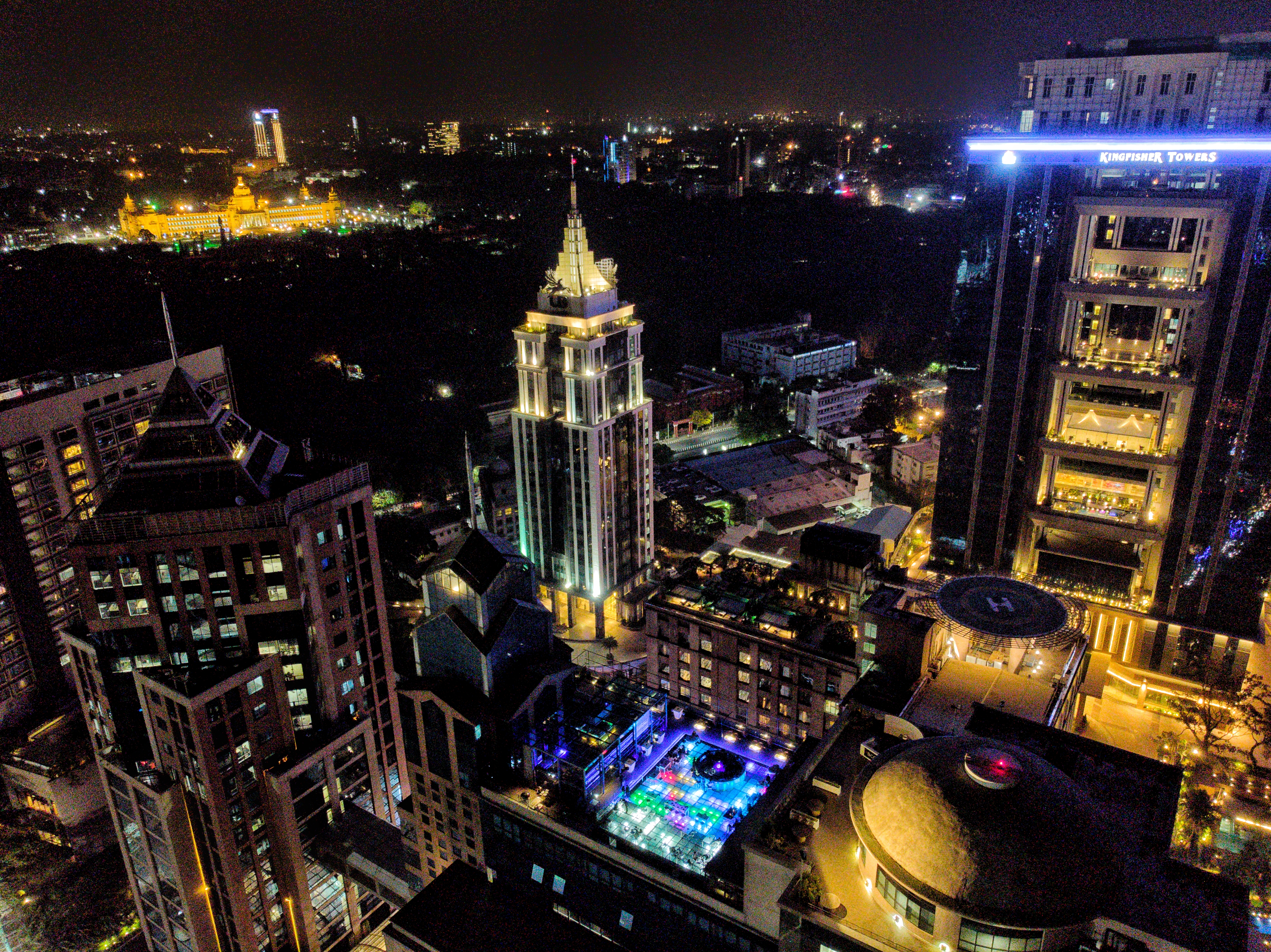
UB City at night

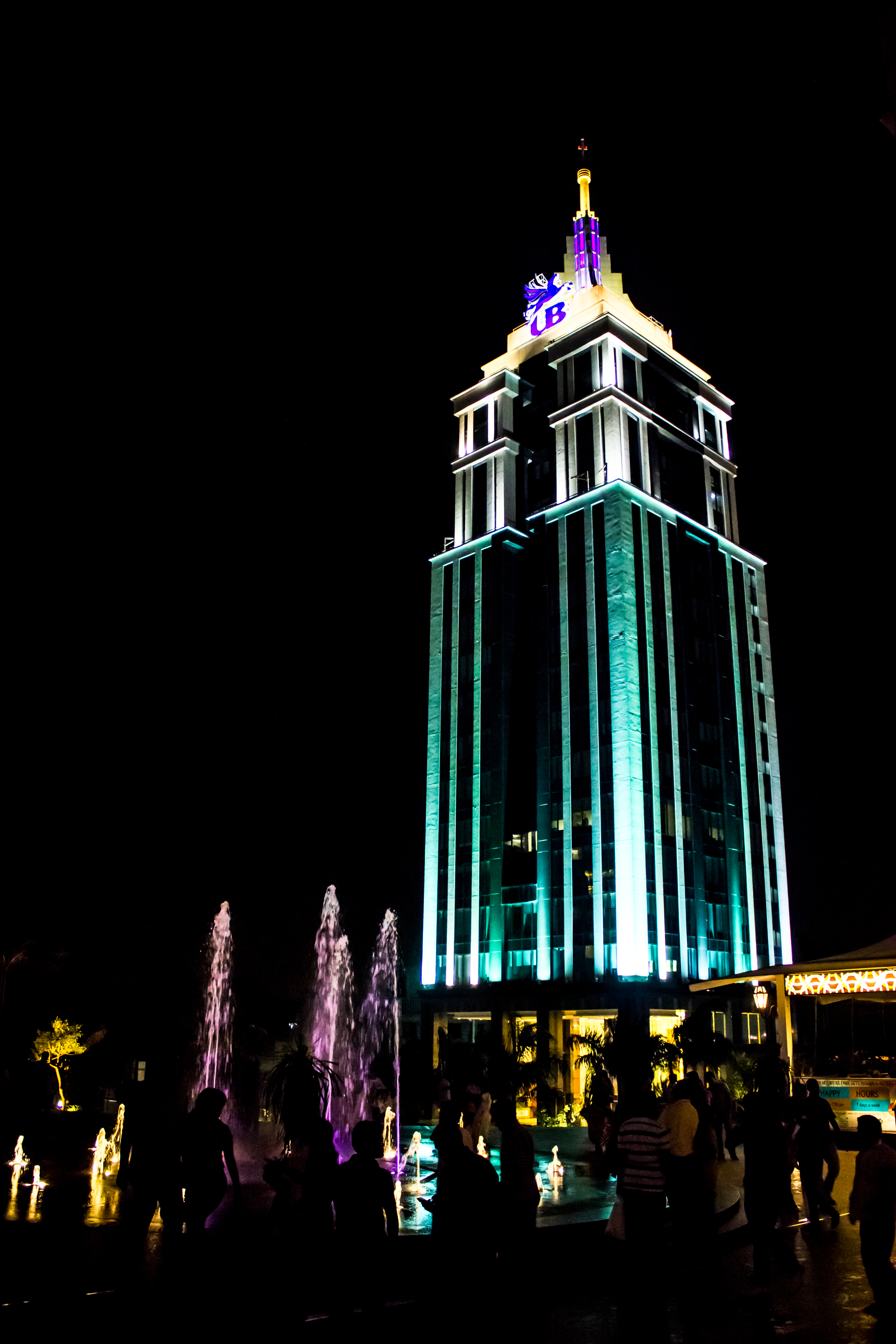
UB Tower

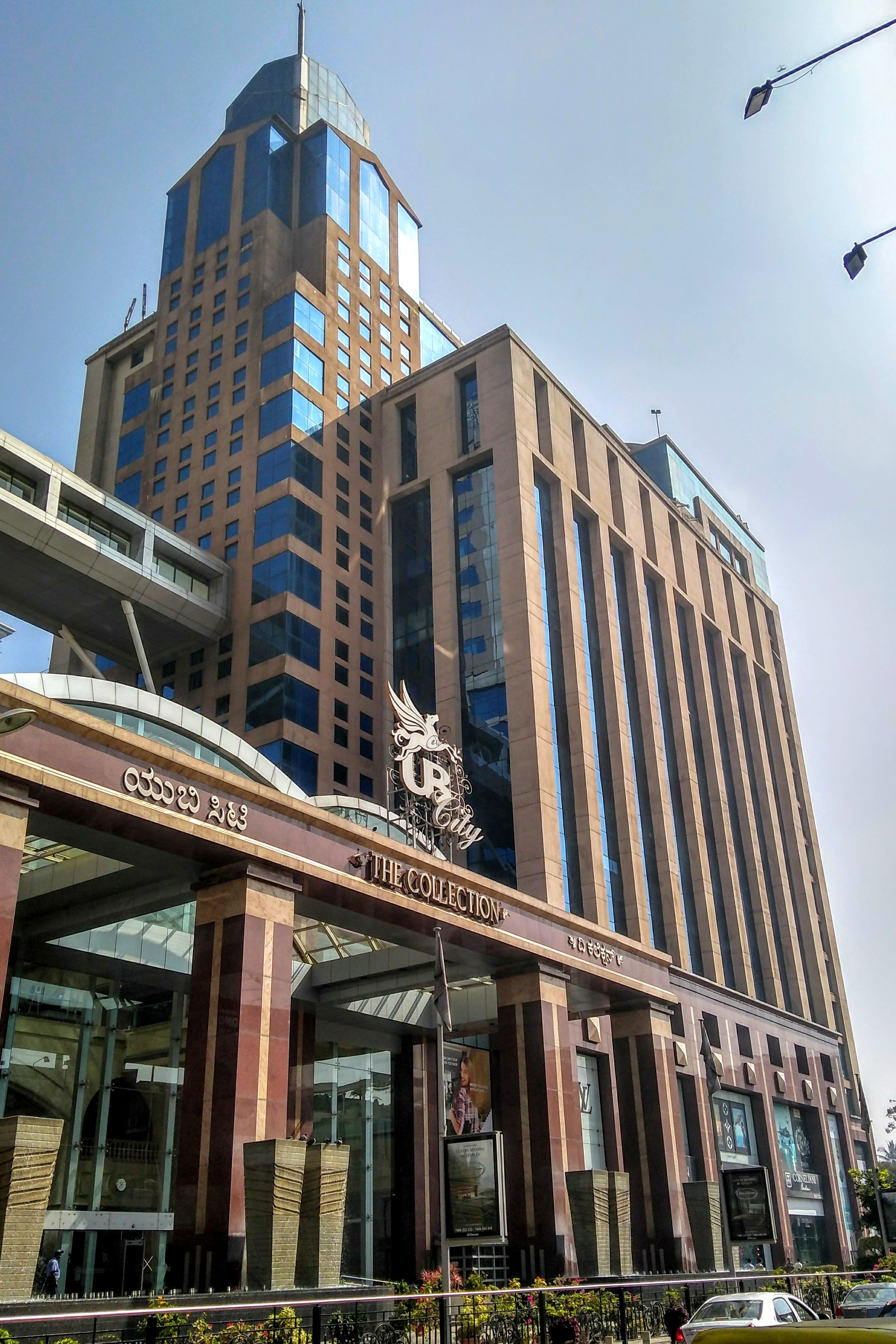
Canberra Tower UB City Bangalore

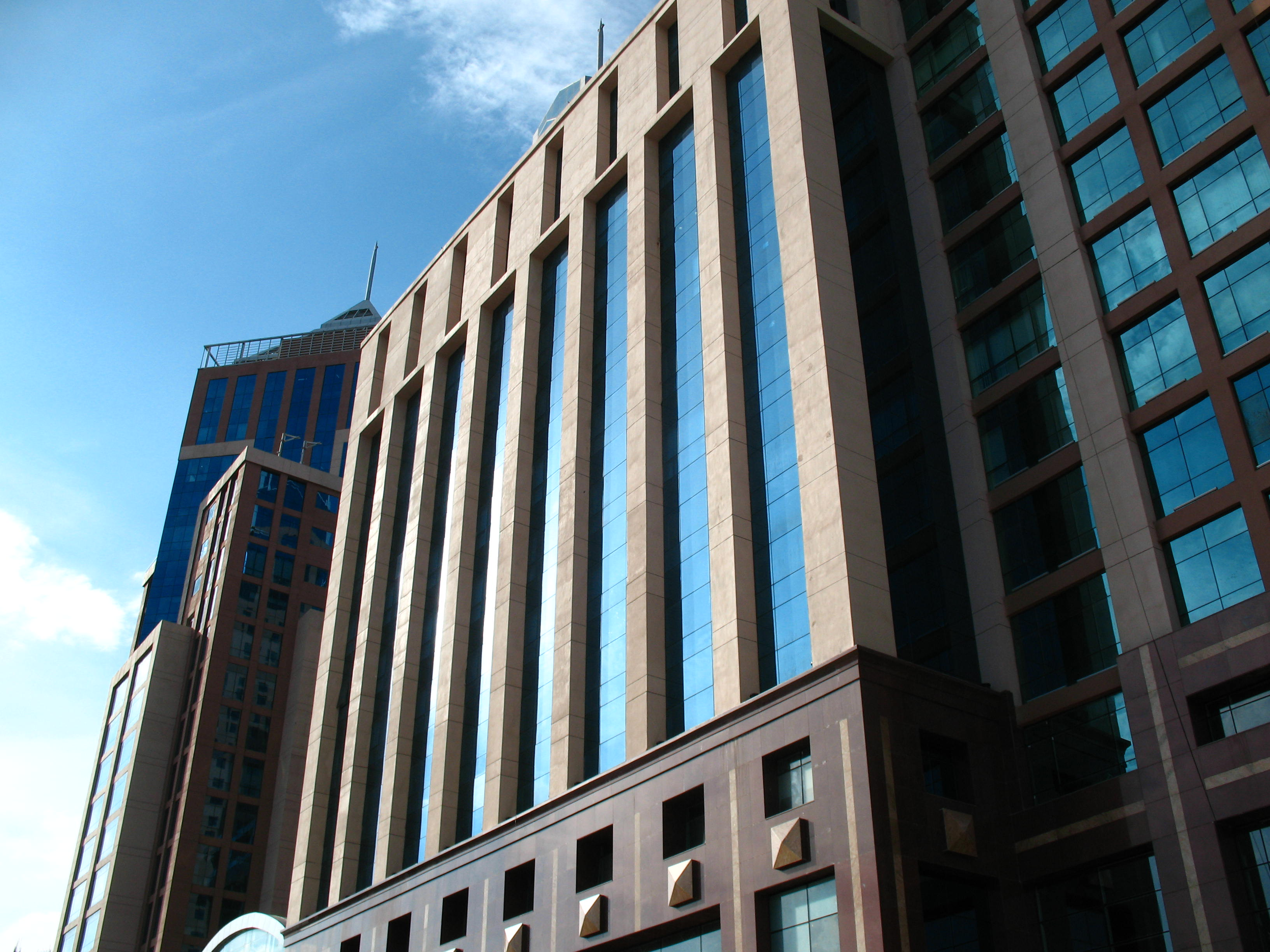
Building in UB City

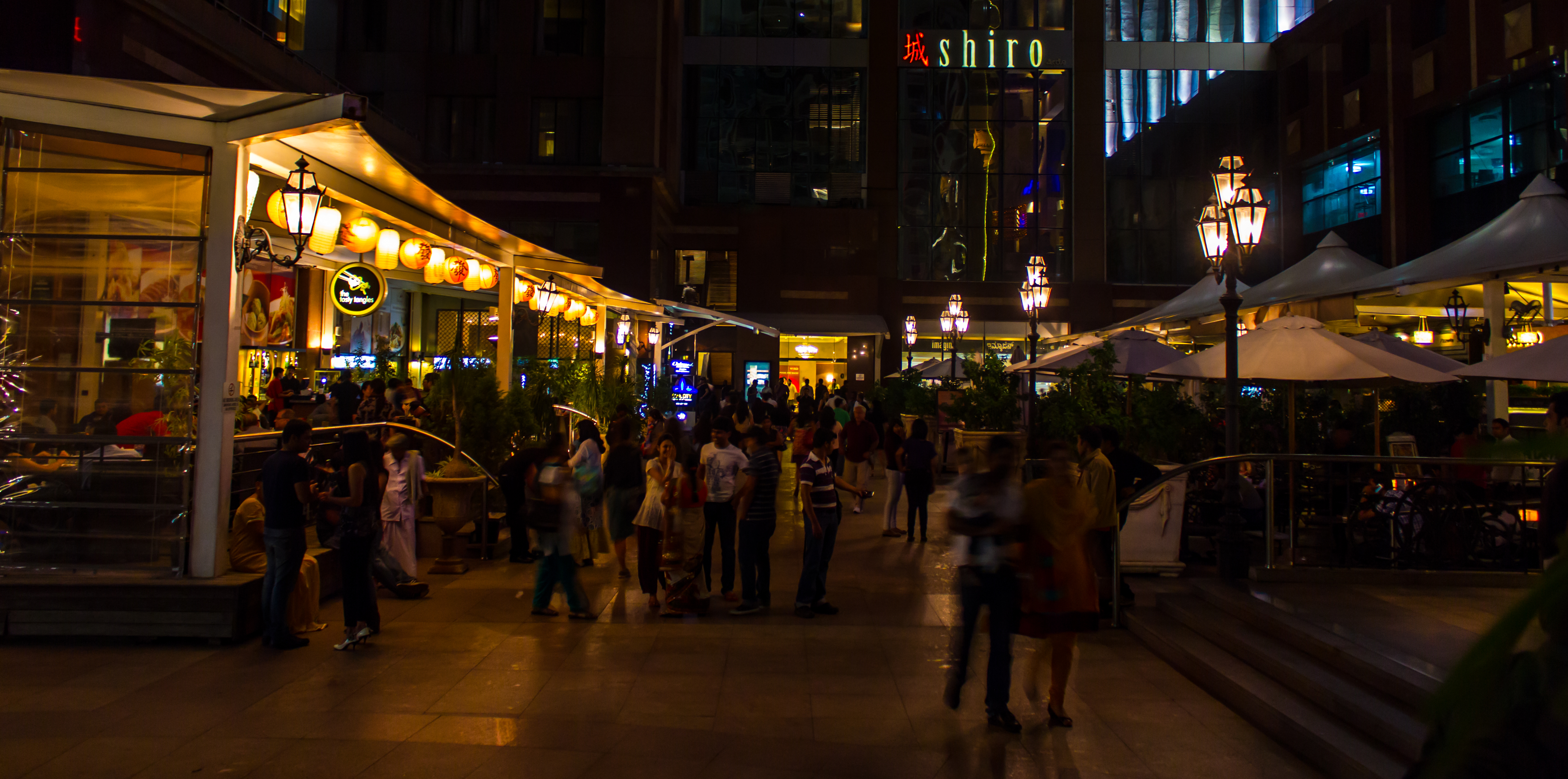
UB City Entrance

== See also ==
- List of tallest buildings in Bangalore
- List of tallest buildings in India
- List of tallest buildings and structures in the Indian subcontinent
