= Battarahalli =

Battarahalli Bhattarahalli
- Neighbourhood
- Country: India
- State: Karnataka
- District: Bengaluru Urban
- Postal code: 560049

Battarahalli (also spelled Bhattarahalli) is a residential locality in the eastern part of Bangalore.

== See also ==
- Krishnarajapuram
- Mahadevapura
- Whitefield, Bangalore
