= Byrathi =

Byrathi ಬ್ಯರಥಿ
- Neighbourhood
- Country: India
- State: Karnataka
- District: Bengaluru Urban
- Postal code: 560077

Byrathi is a residential neighbourhood in the eastern part of Bengaluru, Karnataka.

== See also ==
- Krishnarajapuram
- Mahadevapura
