= Dommasandra =

- Village
- Location in Karnataka, India Dommasandra (India)
- Coordinates: 12.878070°N 77.7542800°E
- Country: India
- State: Karnataka
- District: Bangalore Urban
- Talukas: Anekal

Government
  - Type: Gram Panchayat
  - Body: Dommasandra Gram Panchayat

Population (2001)
  - Total: 9,165

Languages
  - Official: Kannada Telugu
- Time zone: UTC+5:30 (IST)
- PIN: 562125
- ISO 3166 code: IN-KA
- Vehicle registration: KA-01, KA-05, KA-51, KA-53
- Website: karnataka.gov.in

Dommasandra is a village in the southern state of Karnataka, India. It is located in the Anekal Taluk of Bangalore Urban district in Karnataka.

== Demographics ==
As of 2015 India census, Dommasandra had a population of 10,000 with 5,000 males and 5,000 females.
