= Varthur =

Small City in Bangalore, Karnataka, India

Varthuru
- Suburb
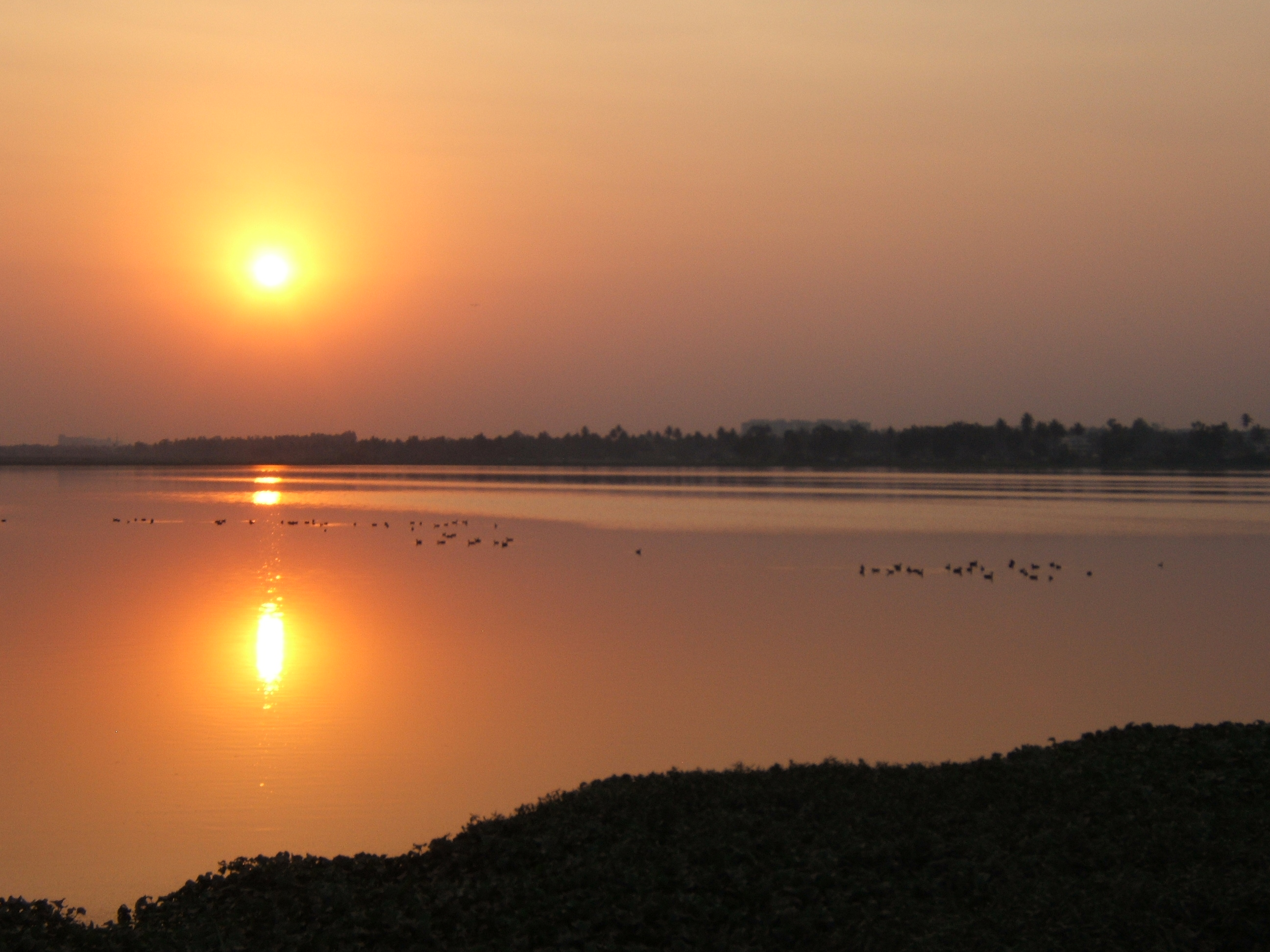
- Sunset over Varthuru lake.

- Location within Karnataka
- Coordinates: 12.940699°N 77.746596°E
- Country: India
- State: Karnataka
- District: Bangalore
- Metro: Bangalore

Government
  - Body: BBMP

Population (January 2015)
  - Total: 46,000

Languages
  - Official: Kannada
- Time zone: UTC+5:30 (IST)
- PIN: 560 087
- Telephone code: 91-(0)80-2853XXXX
- Vehicle registration: KA 53
- Lok Sabha constituency: Bangalore Central
- Vidhan Sabha constituency: Mahadevapura

Varthuru is a suburb situated in the Eastern periphery of Bangalore City and part of the internationally famous Whitefield township. Varthur is a Hobli and part of the Bruhat Bangalore Mahanagara Palike. Varthur was a Legislative Assembly in the state of Karnataka but was split into three legislative assemblies C.V.Raman Nagar, Mahadevapura and Krishnarajapura in the year 2008. It is also one of the wards of BBMP. It is located in South-Eastern Bangalore between old Airport road and Sarjapur road. Varthur is very close to ITPB.

There are many IT companies in Varthuru Hobli. The head office of one of the largest IT companies, Wipro Technologies is situated here. Some other companies such as Cisco Systems, ARM, and Aricent Group, are situated in Varthuru Hobli.

At Varthuru, people celebrate Brahmarathotsava of Sri Chennaraya Swamy, which happens on the day of Ratha Saptami. It is one of the famous events that takes place in this area. Two days later is Karaga of Sri Draupathamma (Draupadi) at Sri Dharmaraya Swamy (Yudhishthira) temple, which happens at night and is visited by thousands of people from Varthur, Gunjur, Madhuranagara, Whitefield, Ramagondannahalli, Balagere, Sorahunase, Immadihalli, Harohalli, Muthsandra, and Kotur.

== Geography ==
Varthuru is located at 12.940699°N 77.746596°E. The river Dakshina Pinakini flows through Varthur.

== Administration ==
- MP Constituency : Bangalore Central
- MLA Constituency : Mahadevapura
- BBMP Ward : Varthur
- MP : P C Mohan (Bharatiya Janata Party (BJP))
- MLA : Manjula Aravind Limbavali (BJP)
- Councilor: Yet to be elected

== Educational institutions ==
- New Horizon College of Engineering
- CMR Institute of Technology
- Pratham International School, Varthur
- Krupanidhi Nursing pharmacy degree and PU College, Gunjur
- Government Degree College, Varthur
- Government High School and Junior College, Varthur
- Government Middle School, Varthur
- Jnana sagar vidya mandir school, Varthur
- Sri Sharadha Vidhya Mandir, Varthur
- Ryan International
- K K Education Society
- Vagdevi Vilas School (at Varthur and Marathahalli)
- Lady Vailankanni Group of Institutions
- Chrysalis High, Gunjur
- Sri Ravishankar Vidya Mandir
- Vibgyor High School, Marathahalli
- Chrysalis High School In, Varthur, Gunjur Main Road
- Vahe Global Academy, Varthur, Gunjur
- Deen's Academy, in whitefield ECC Road
- Global Indian International School, near Dommasandra Circle
- Greenwood High near Dommasandra Circle
- TISB International School near Dommasandra Circle
- Inventure Academy near Dommasandra Circle
- Oakridge International School near Dommasandra Circle
- Indus International School in Dommasandra Circle
- Abhijatha Education Society (SLF Convent)
- Karnataka Public Schools Kps Varthur

== Varthuru Main Road ==
The stretch starting from HAL old Airport road till Varthuru via Marathahalli, Kundalahalli, Thubarahalli, Siddhapura, Ramagondanahalli, and Varthuru Kodi is officially known as Varthur Main Road.

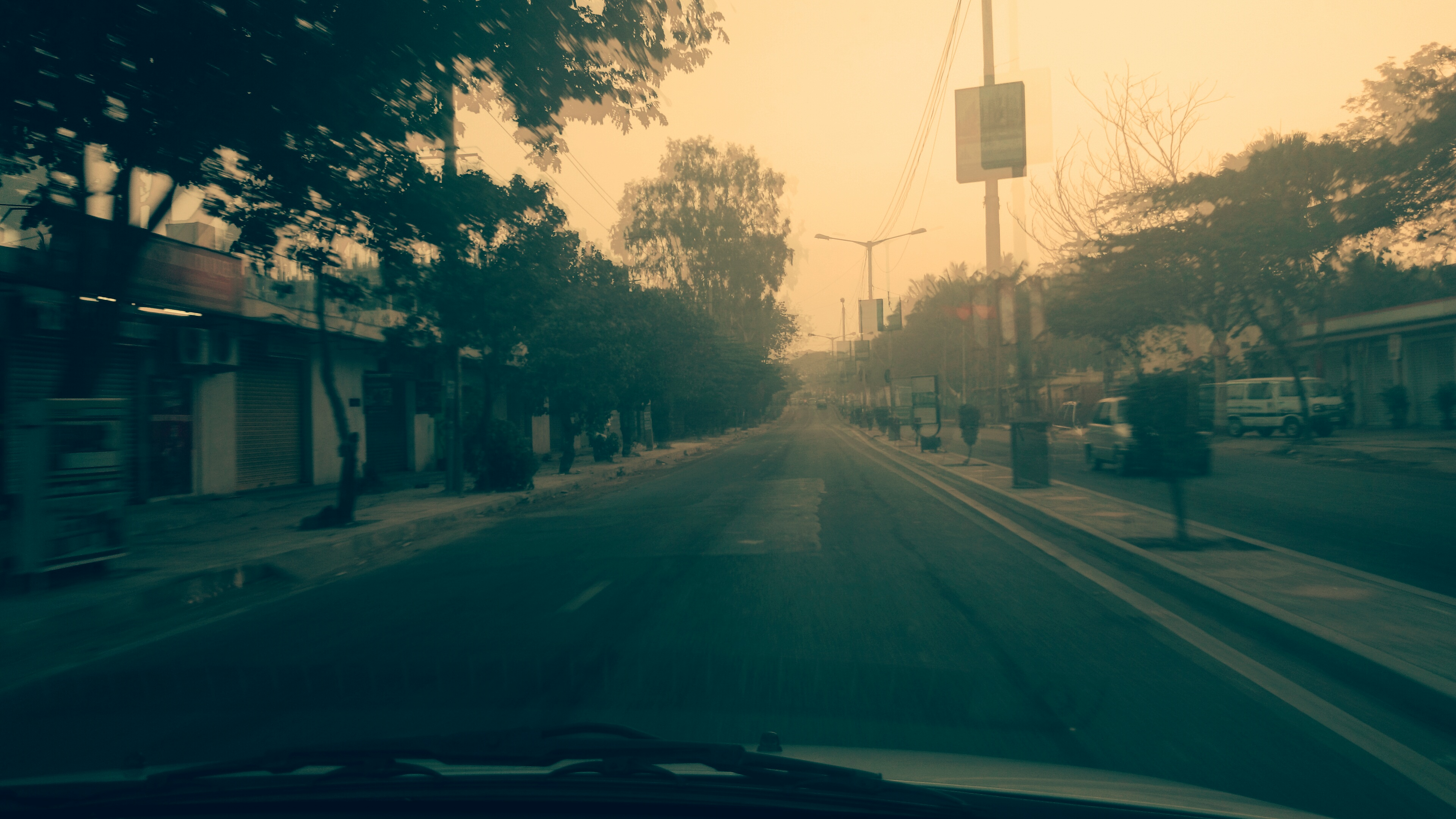

== Varthur lake ==
The lake ecosystem is an integral part of Bangalore, although unplanned urbanisation and industrialisation have led to the contamination of these water bodies. Varthuru Lake, which has an area of 180.40 ha (445.8 acres) is the second largest lake in Bangalore city and also one of the most polluted lakes in Bangalore. Its ecosystem is under continuous degradation because of sewage water from Bangalore entering the lake from Bellandur Lake, further upstream.

This is a man-made lake, built by the Ganga kings thousands of years ago for agriculture and domestic uses but now the lake is receiving 40% of the sewage water from Bangalore for over 50 years resulting in eutrophication.

== Gallery ==
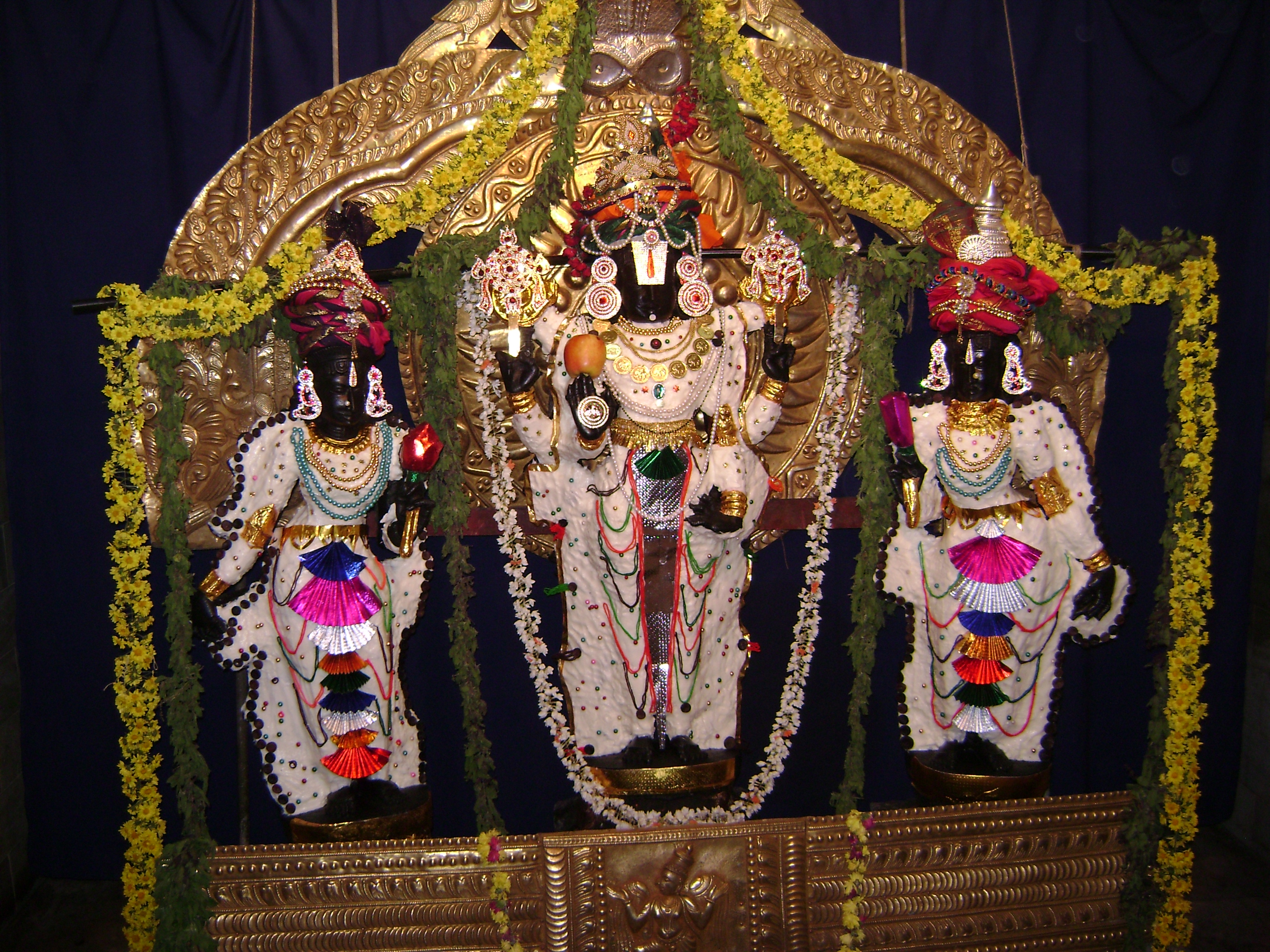
Sree Chennaraya Swamy

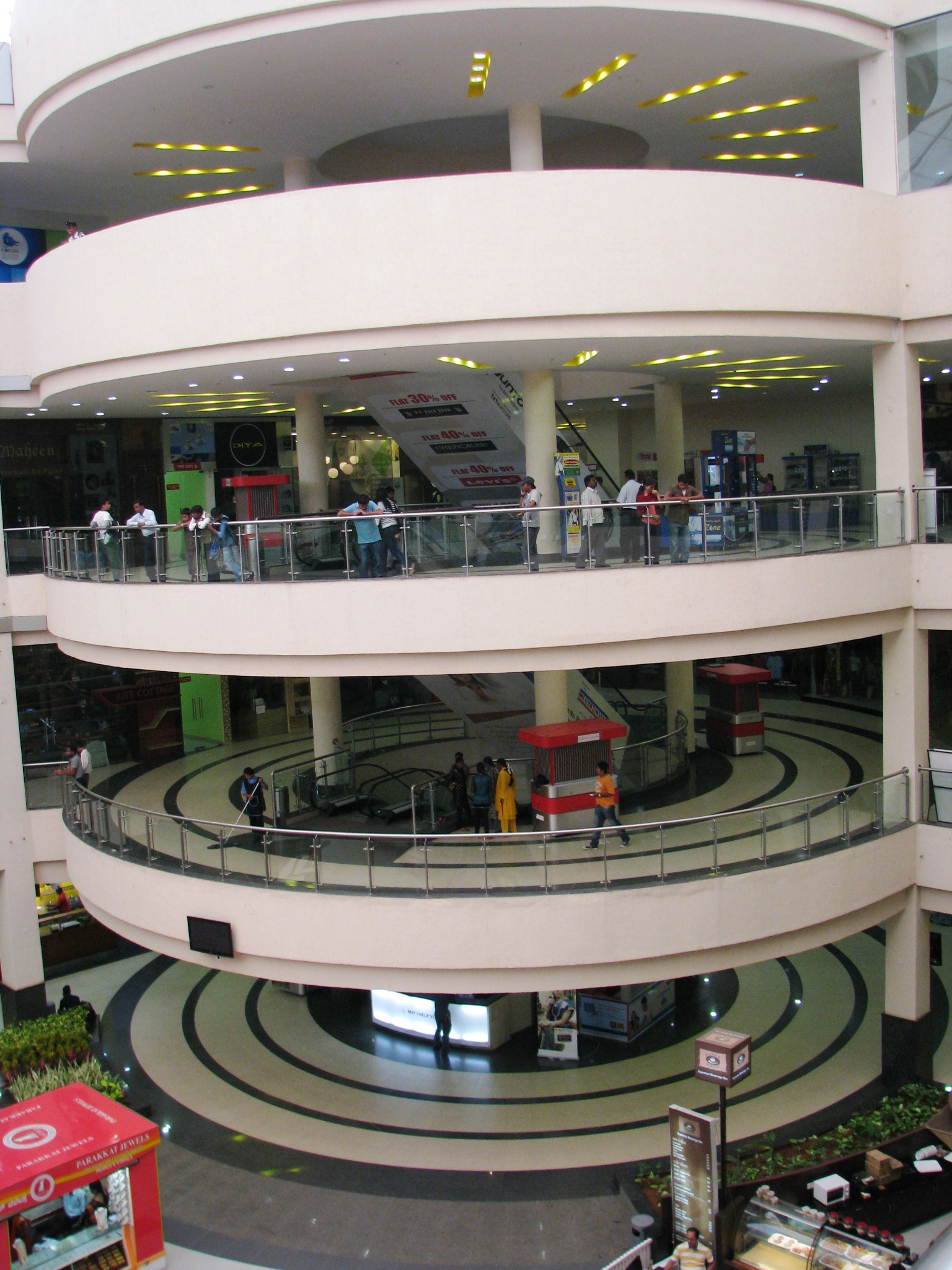
Nexus Whitefield Mall (Formerly Forum Value Mall)

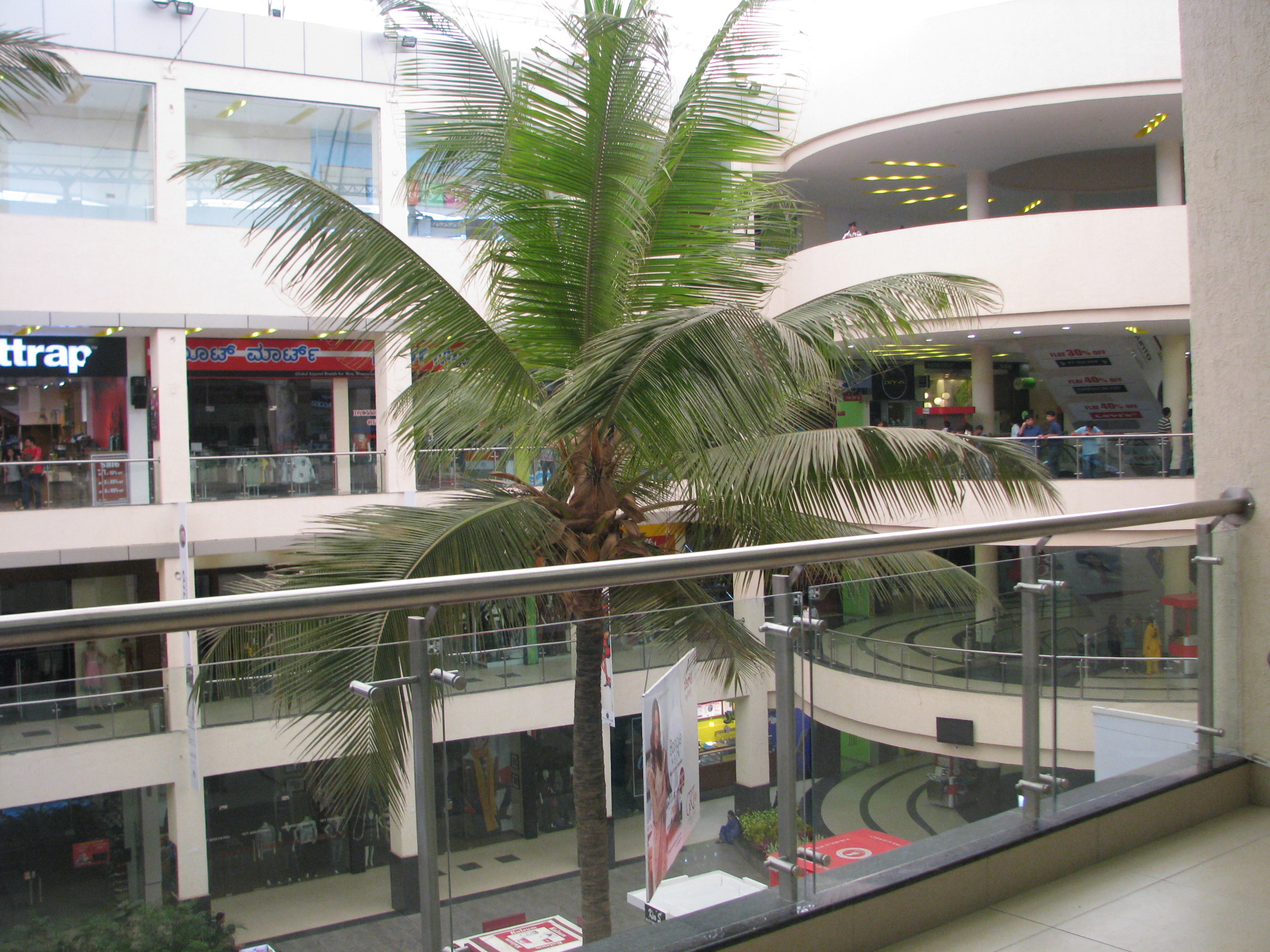
Nexus Whitefield Mall (Formerly Forum Value Mall)

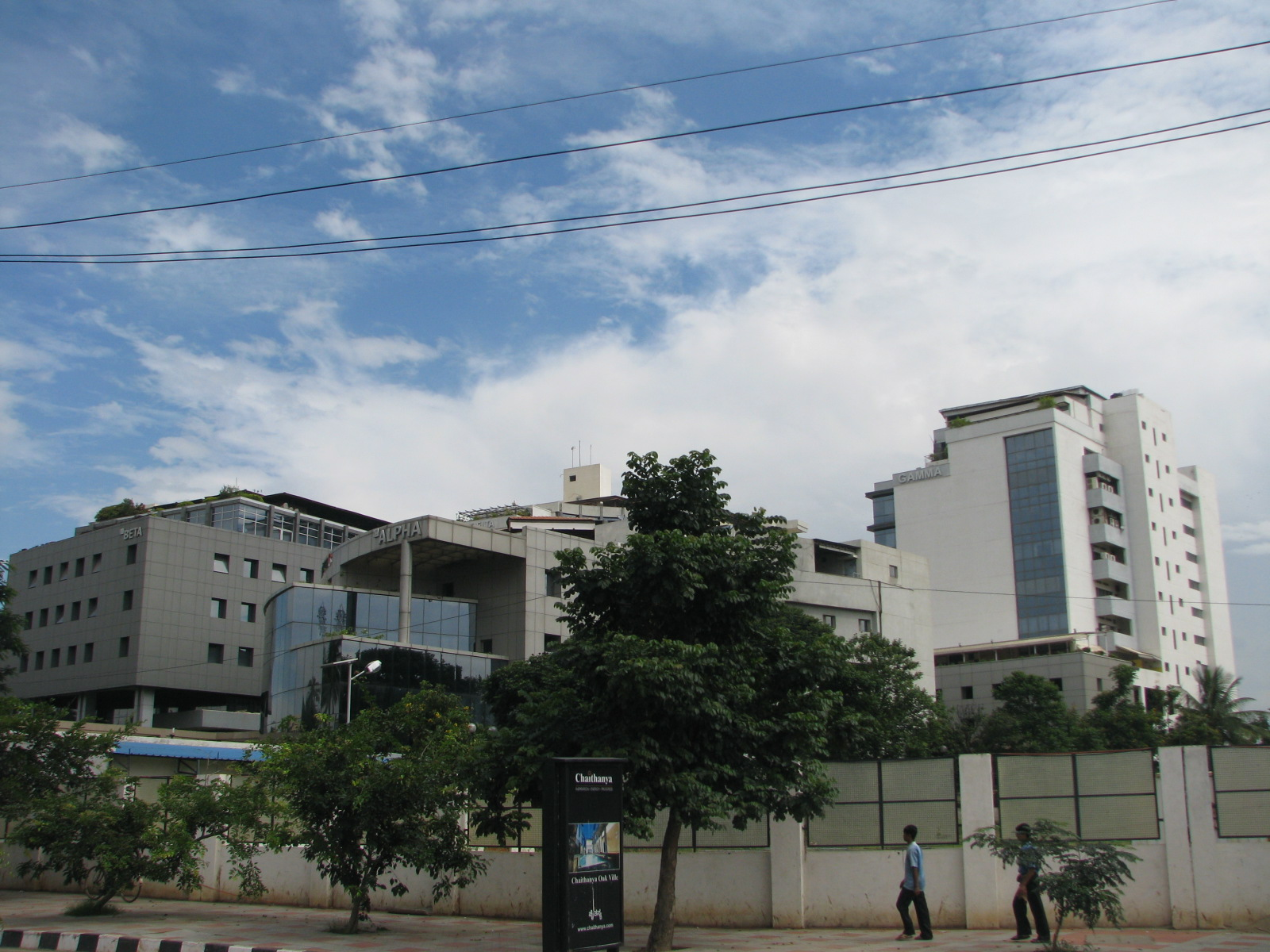
Sigma Technology Park
