= B. M. Kaval =

B. M. Kaval may refer to:

- Binnamangala Manavarthe Kaval or BM Kaval, former village and present neighborhood in Bangalore
- Baiyyappanahalli Manavarthe Kaval, a neighborhood in Bangalore
- Badamanavarthekaval or BM Kaval, a village in Bangalore South Taluk, Bangalore Urban district
