= Bettadasanapura =

- village
- Bettadasanapura is in Bengaluru Urban district
- Country: India
- State: Karnataka
- District: Bengaluru Urban
- Taluk: Bengaluru South

Government
  - Body: Village Panchayat

Area
  - Total: 1.9211 km^{2} (0.7417 sq mi)

Population (2011)
  - Total: 1,777
  - Density: 925.0/km^{2} (2,396/sq mi)

Languages
  - Official: Kannada
- Time zone: UTC+5:30 (IST)
- PIN: 560068
- Vehicle registration: KA 51
- Nearest city: Bengaluru
- Civic agency: Village Panchayat

Bettadasanapura is a village in the southern state of Karnataka, India. It is located in the Bengaluru South taluk of Bengaluru Urban District.The name, Bettadasanapura, is derived from three kannada words: betta means "hill", dasa means "servant of god" and pura means "town".
