= Punugumarana Halli =

Punugumarana Halli is a village in Bangalore Urban district, India.
