= Bileshivale =

Bileshivale ಬಿಳೇಶಿವಾಲೆ
- Neighbourhood
- Country: India
- State: Karnataka
- District: Bengaluru Urban district
- City: Bengaluru
- Zone/Ward: Hoodi Ward (Ward 54)

Government
  - Type: Municipal Corporation
  - Body: Bruhat Bengaluru Mahanagara Palike (BBMP)
- Time zone: UTC+05:30 (IST)
- PIN: 560077
- Vehicle registration: KA-53 / KA-03

Bileshivale (Kannada: ಬಿಳೇಶಿವಾಲೆ) is a neighbourhood in the northern part of Bengaluru, Karnataka, India. It is situated in the Bengaluru Urban district under the Bruhat Bengaluru Mahanagara Palike.

Public Transport: Bileshivale is well connected through the Yelahanka - Hosakote BMTC bus route 280F. There are buses to KR Market, Shivajinagara and Kempegowda Bus Station as well - prominently 294, 295D, 294F, 294A and 294S. The nearest metro station will be the upcoming Horamavu Metro Station on the Blue Line of Namma Metro.

Bileshivale is home to several big residential projects (existing and upcoming).

Famous Spots Nearby: Kattanagiri Anjaneya Temple Doddagubbi Lake Hennur Lake Doddagubbi GBA Park BITS Club

== See also ==
- Bengaluru Urban district
- Bileshivale inscriptions and hero stones
