= Sathanur, Bengaluru =

Sathanuru Sathanur
- village
- Location in Karnataka, India Sathanuru (India)
- Coordinates: 13.125812°N 77.630442°E
- Country: India
- State: Karnataka
- District: Bengaluru Urban

Languages
  - Official: Kannada
- Time zone: UTC+5:30 (IST)
- PIN: 560064
- ISO 3166 code: IN-KA
- Vehicle registration: KA
- Website: karnataka.gov.in

Sathanur is a village located near Yelahanka in Bengaluru of Karnataka, India.

== Transport ==
Sathanur is located at 9 km from Yelahanka.

=== Bus ===
Bus routes 401BK, 289, 289A, 289B, 289C, 289E, 289F, 289H, 289J, 289K, 289Z, 289L, 289P, 289M serve Sathanur

=== Rail ===
Yelahanka Jn. is the nearest railway station
