= Bileshivale inscriptions and hero stones =

Temple inscriptions in Karnataka, India

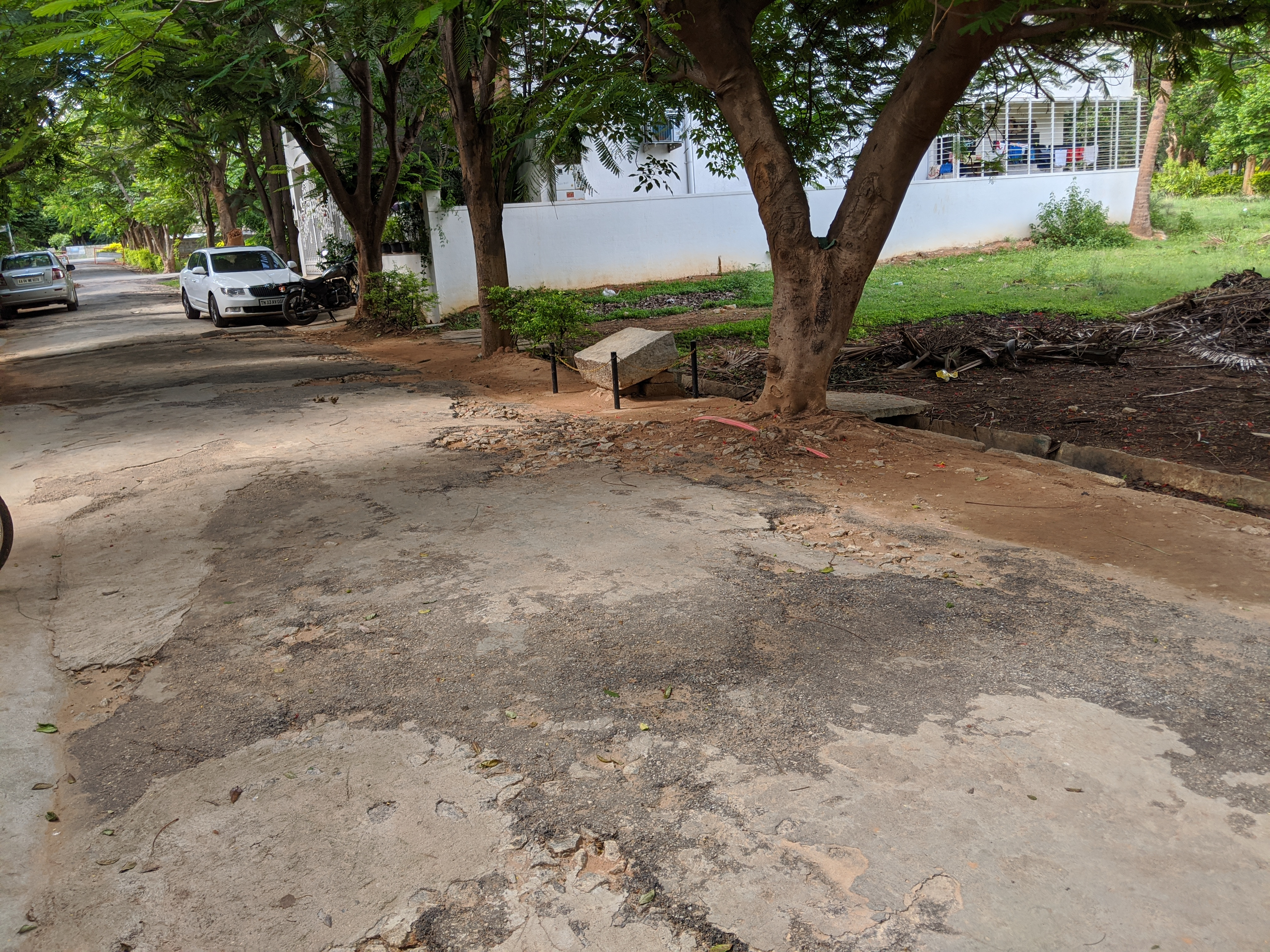
A Street View of the Bileshivale 1399CE Damodara Setti Tamil Inscription.

Bileshivale is a historic locality in Bengaluru. An inscription at Bileshivale is being documented here for the first time. It documents existence of a temple in the 14th century at Bileshivale, the location of which cannot be ascertained. This inscription shows that Kalkere, the lake and the place are at least 700 years old.

== Bileshivale 1399CE Damodara Setti Inscription ==
Damodara Setti Tamil Inscription
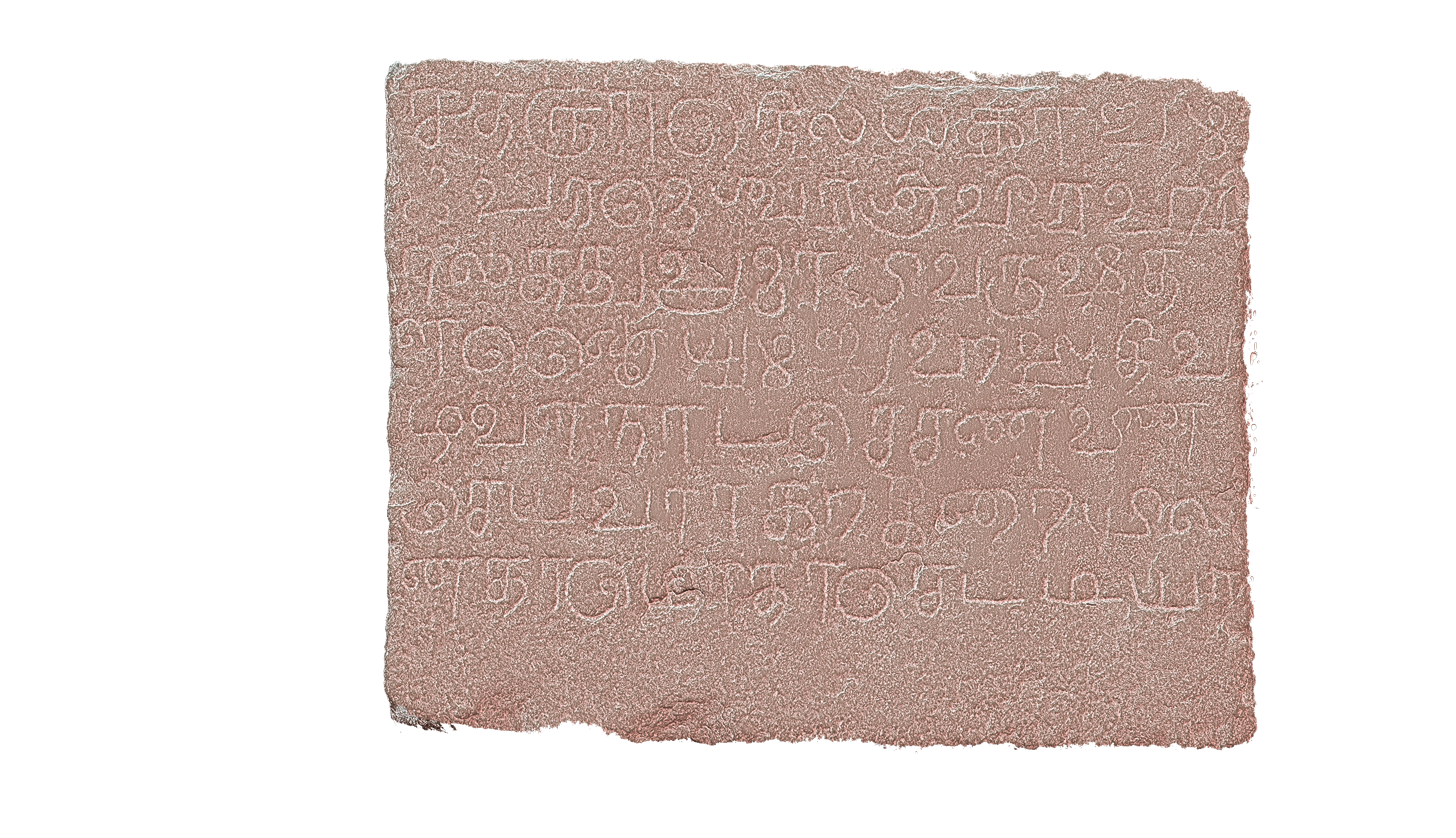
- Text on the frontal face

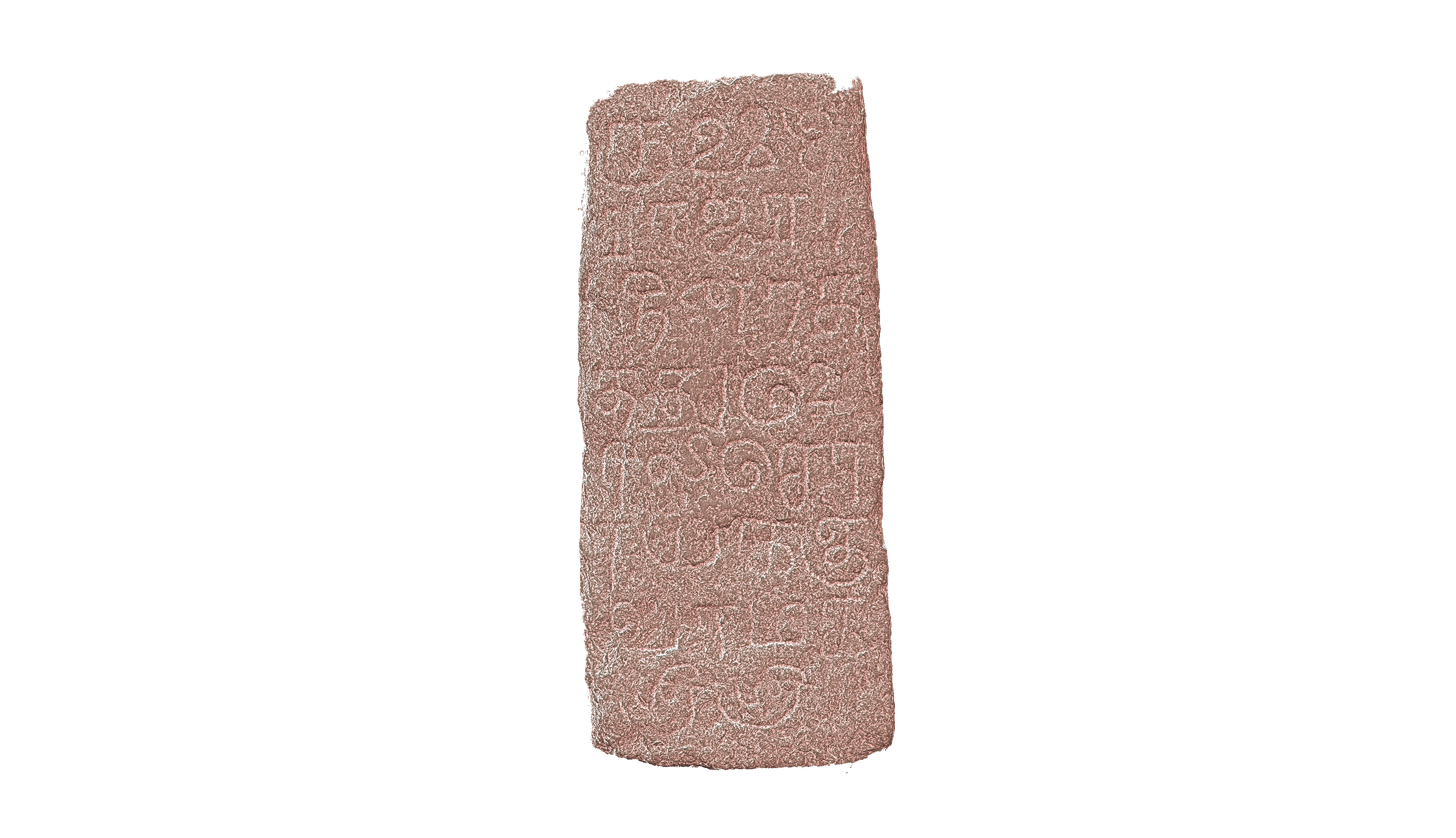
- Text on the lateral face
- Language: Tamil
- Height: 114 cm (45 in)
- Width: 77 cm (30 in)
- Discovered place: Bileshavile, Bengaluru, Karnataka
- Discovered: 1911
- Present location: 13.0514444°N 77.66625°E

=== Discovery And Dating ===
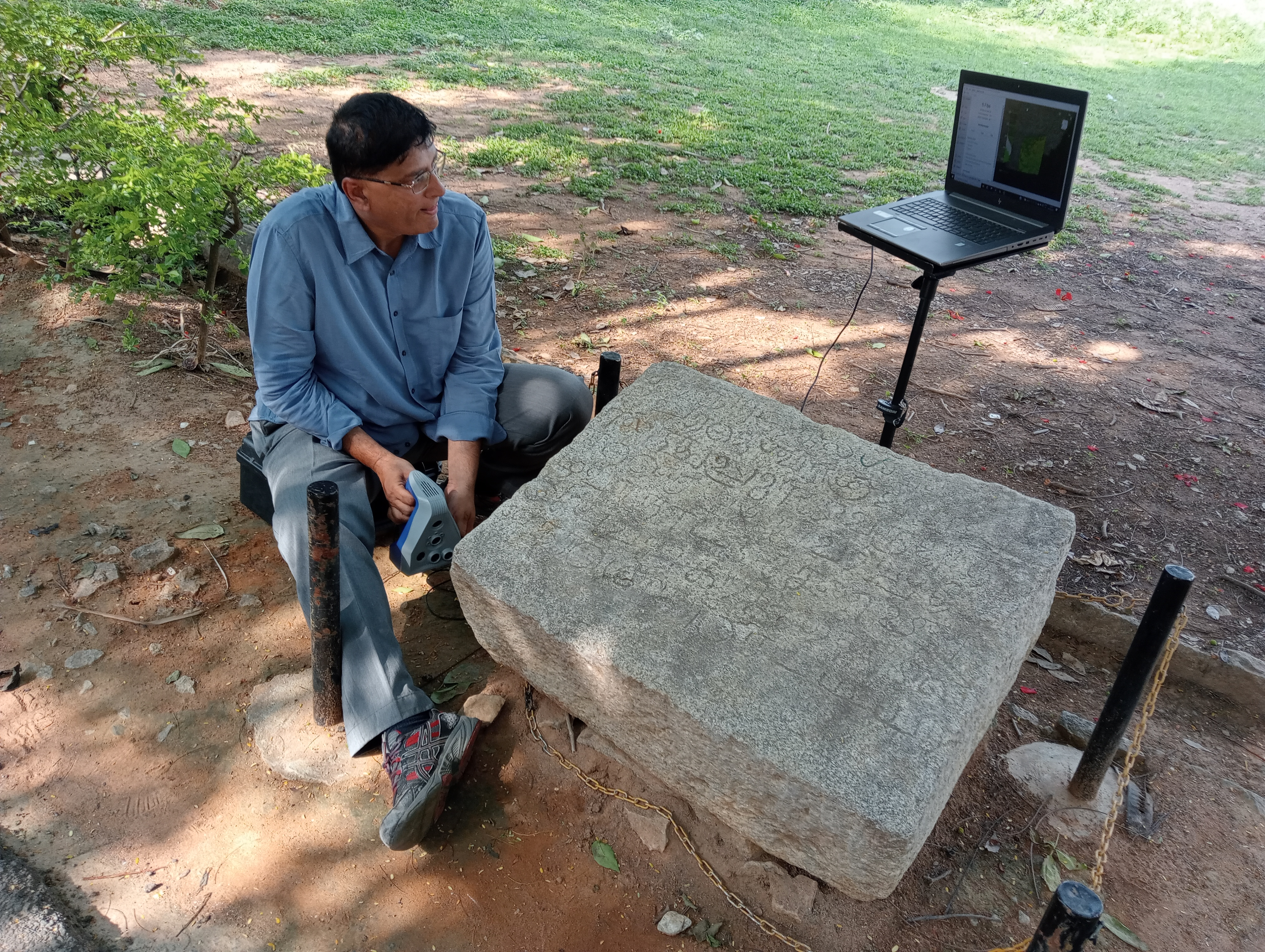
3D scanning of the Bileshivale 1399CE Damodara Setti Tamil Inscription.

This inscription was first noticed in 1911 by R Narasimhachar (Head, Mysore Archaeological Department) and documented in the Annual Report of The Archaeological Survey Of Mysore For The Year 1910 To 1912. Subsequently, There is no mention of the inscription in literature. Kalkere Lake guardian Mark Mackenna Anthony noticed this inscription near a sewage drain during his morning stroll in 2018. It has since been conserved opposite Creative School, L G Lakedew, Bileshivale.

In 2022, this inscription was identified and 3D digital scanned by the Mythic Society Bengaluru Inscriptions 3D Digital Conservation Project team based on media reports about the inscription.

=== Transliteration Of The Text ===
The inscription is in Tamil and the script is Grantha and Tamil. The inscription was deciphered by Citizen Epigraphists, Soundari Rajkumar & Pon Karthikeyan. As the text flows from the left side of the stone to the front side, the table below consolidates text from both sides into one line for ease of reading purposes The exact transliteration of the inscription in Kannada and ISAT (line numbers are not part of the original inscription, including them is a default practice with inscriptions) are as follows:

| sl no. | Tamil | Kannada | IAST |
|---|---|---|---|
| | ...வருஷம் 4500* இதில் ஶகாப்தம் | ...ವರುಷಂ 4500* ಇತಿಲ್ ಶಕಾಪ್ತಂ | ...varuṣam 4500* itil śakāptam |
| | ...ராஜராஜ பரமேஸ்வர ஸ்ரீ வீரஹரி | ...ರಾಜರಾಜ ಪರಮೇಸ್ವರ ಶ್ರೀ ವೀರಹರಿ | ...rājarāja paramesvara śrī vīrahari |
| | ...நின்ற காலத்து ப்ருமாதி வருஷத்து | ...ನಿನ಼್ಱ ಕಾಲತ್ತು ಪ್ರುಮಾತಿ ವರುಷತ್ತು | ...niṉṟa kālattu prumāti varuṣattu |
| | ...த்து வெளண்ரையும் ப்ரஹஸ்ப தி வ | ...ತ್ತು ವೆಳಣ್ರೈಯುಂ ಪ್ರಹಸ್ಪ ತಿ ವ | ...ttu vĕl̤aṇraiyum prahaspa ti va |
| | ...ரலி சோழ வளநாட்டுச் சண்ணை | ...ರಲಿ ಚೋೞ ವಳನಾಟ್ಟುಚ್ ಚಣ್ಣೈ | ...rali coḻa val̤anāṭṭuc caṇṇai |
| | ...யக்கு செய்வார் கற்கிறையில் | ...ಯಕ್ಕು ಚೆಯ್ವಾರ್ ಕಱ್ಕಿಱೈಯಿಲ್ | ...yakku cĕyvār kaṟkiṟaiyil |
| | ...வா மகன் தாமோதர செட்டியா(ர்) | ...ವಾ ಮಕನ಼್ ತಾಮೋತರ ಚೆಟ್ಟಿಯಾ(ರ್) | ...vā makaṉ tāmotara cĕṭṭiyā(r) |
| | ...ஸ்ரீ ஸ்ரீ | ...ಶ್ರೀ ಶ್ರೀ | ...śrī śrī |

=== Summary Of The Text ===
MAR mentions the inscription on two stones, today, only one of these is traceable. So rather than provide an incomplete summary based on this one stone, a complete summary is provided here based on the narration in MAR. This inscription explains that during the rule of Rajadiraja Raja Parameshwara Vira Harirayan, Damodara Settiyar of Kalkere, who was the superintendent of Tenkuru Nadu in Sannai Nadu of Nigarili Sola Mandalam had made this lamp pillar.

== See also ==
- Indian Inscriptions
- History of Bangalore
