= Kannamangala =

- village
- Location in Karnataka, India
- Coordinates: 13°12′53″N 77°40′01″E
- Country: India
- State: Karnataka
- District: Bangalore Rural

Government
  - Body: Grama Panchayat

Population (2011)
  - Total: 4,381

Languages
  - Official: Kannada
- Time zone: UTC+5:30 (IST)
- PIN: 560115
- Vehicle registration: KA 43
- Nearest city: Bengaluru
- State Code: 29
- District Code: 583
- Taluk Code: 05603

Kannamangala is a village located in Bangalore East Tehsil, in the Bangalore Rural district in Karnataka, India. It is situated 6 km away from the sub-district headquarters of Bangalore East. As per 2009 stats, Kannamangala village is also a gram panchayat.

The total geographical area of village is 325.13 hectares. Kannamangala has a total population of 4,381 people, and 1,146 houses.

== Kannamangala Lake ==
Kannamangala Lake is spread over 18 acres. It was the lifeline of Kannamangala, Seegehalli and Doddabhanahalli and served the panchayats as a main source of water to the whole region with a population of more than 25.000. The three panchayaths belong to the greater Whitefield district of Bangalore.
