= Bengaluru Urban district =

- District
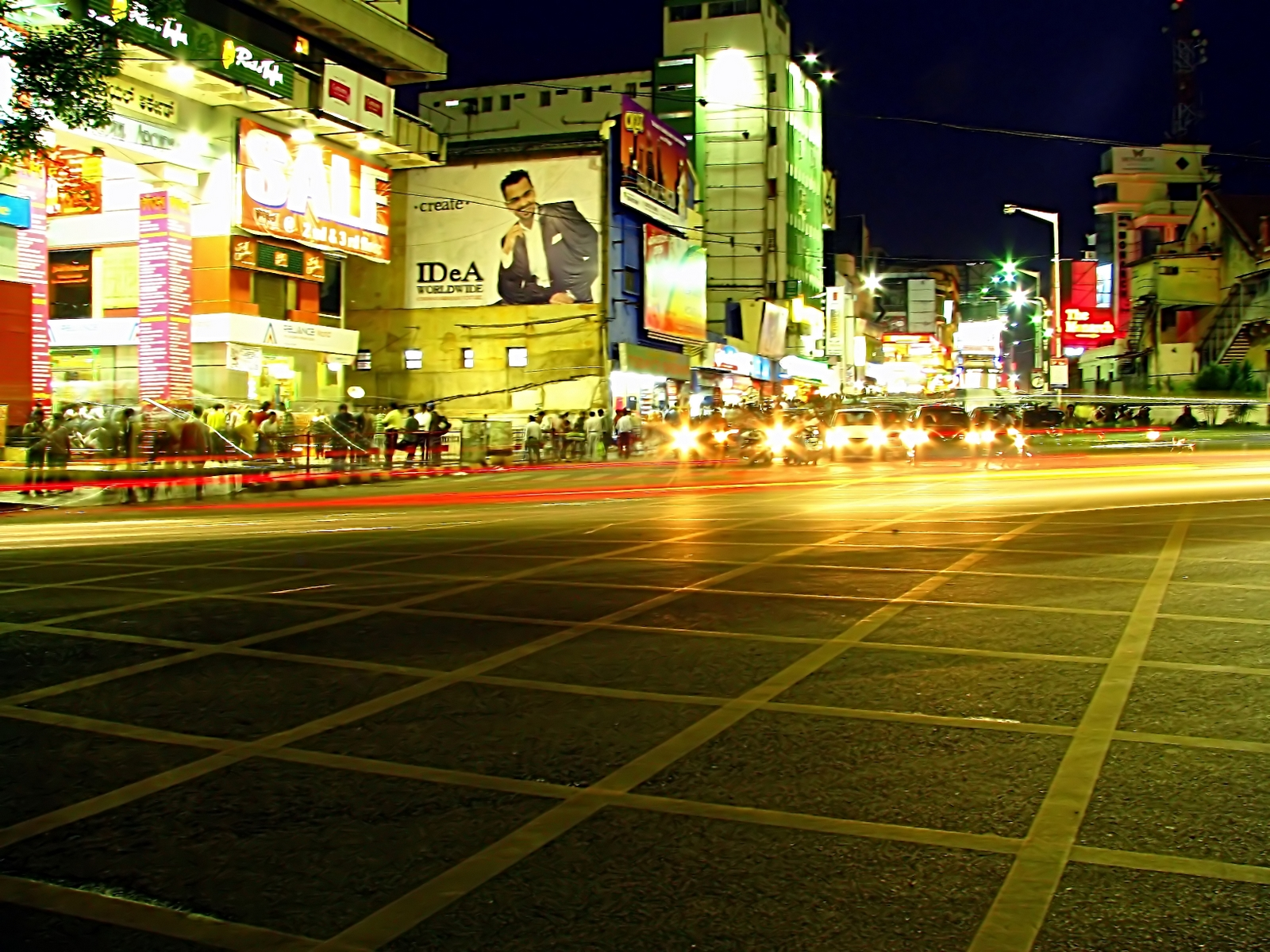
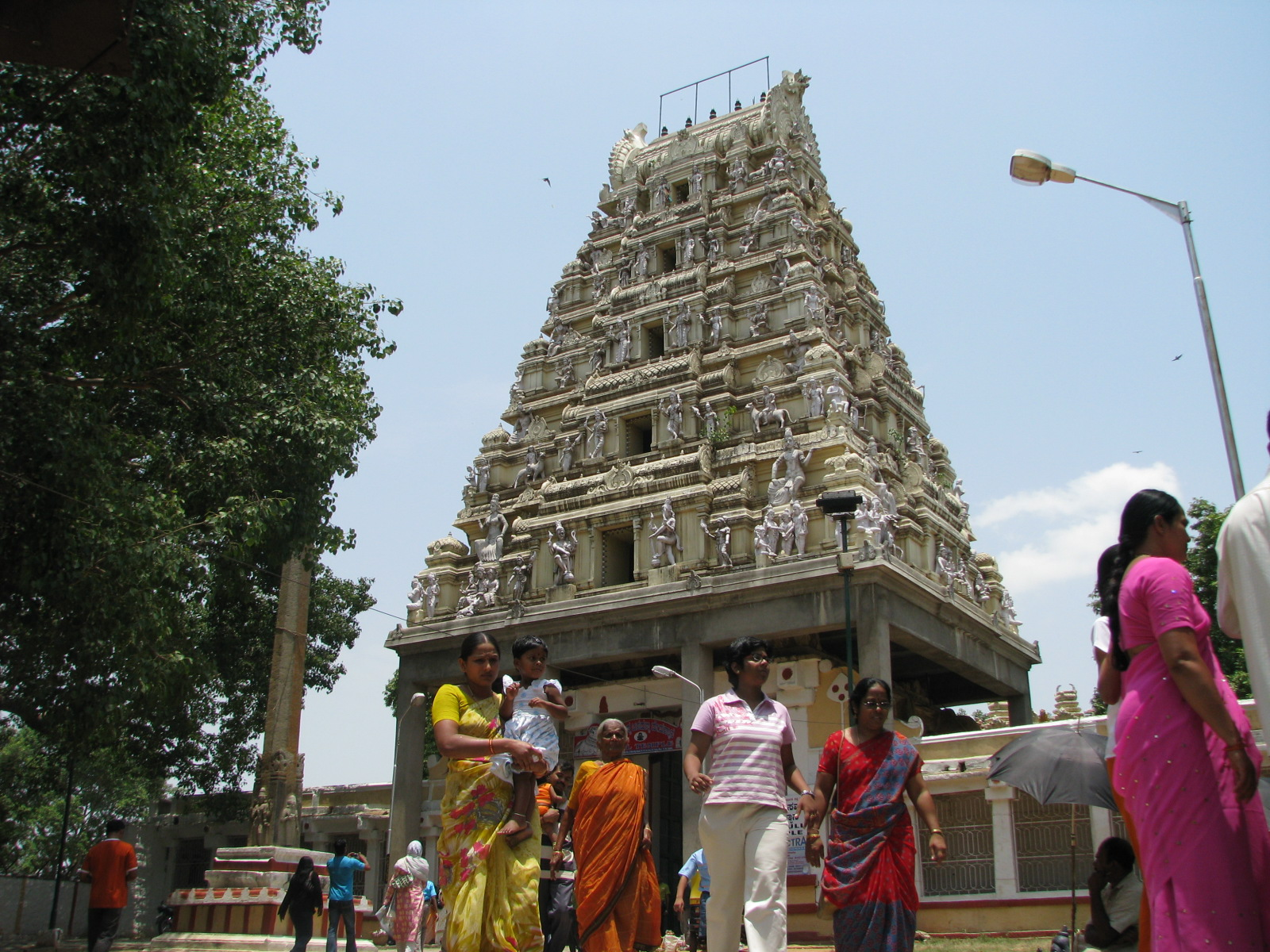
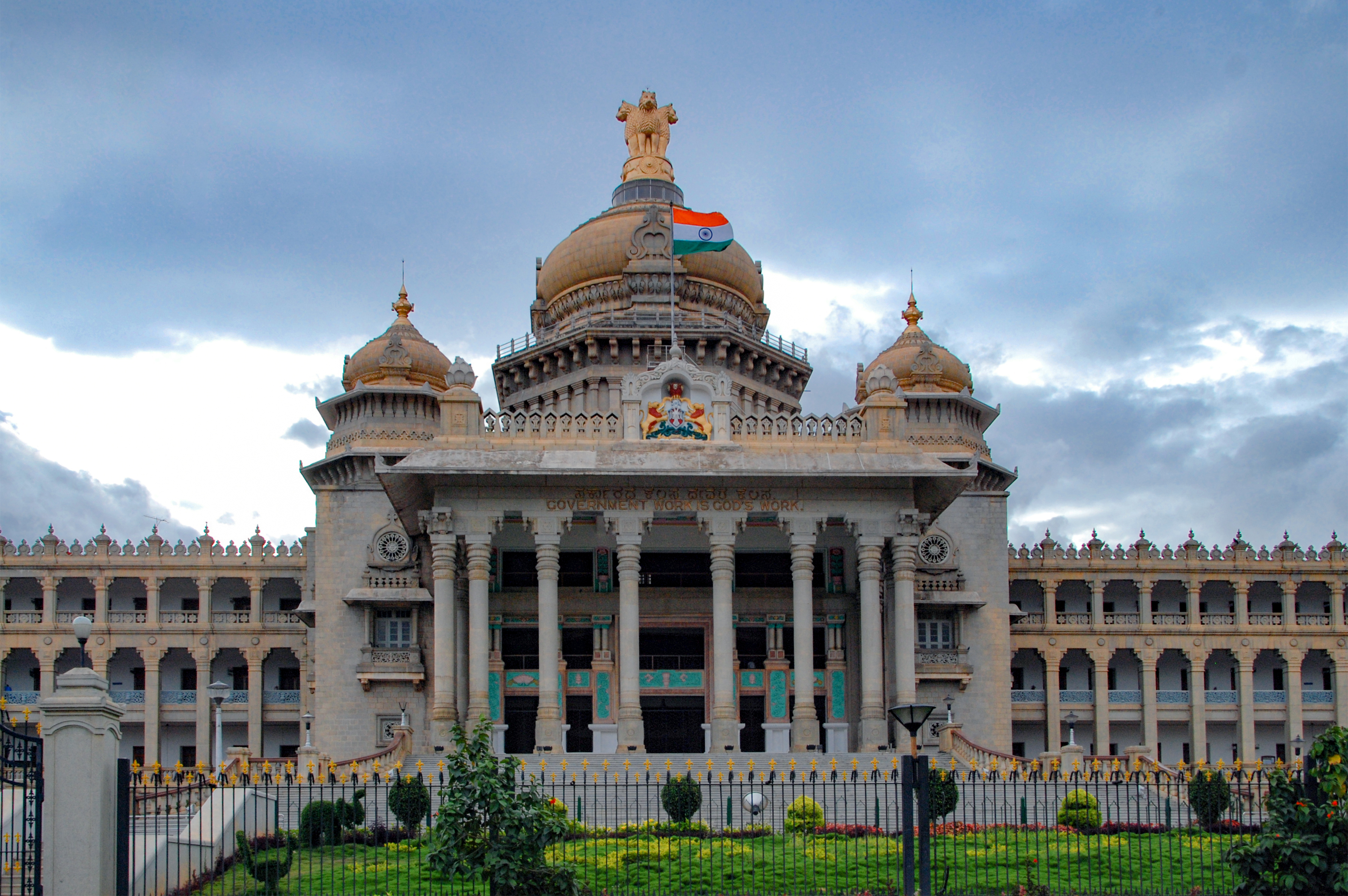
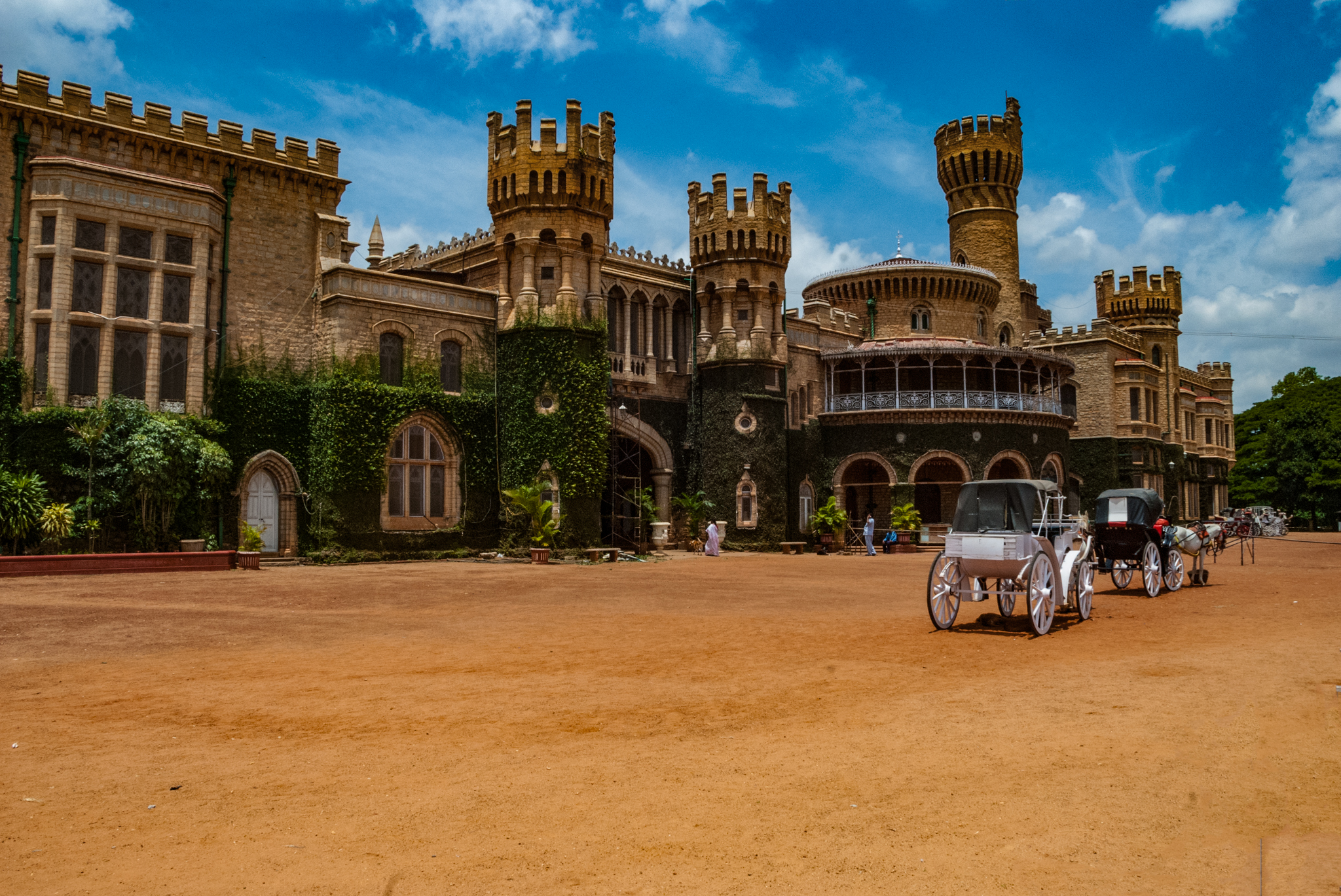
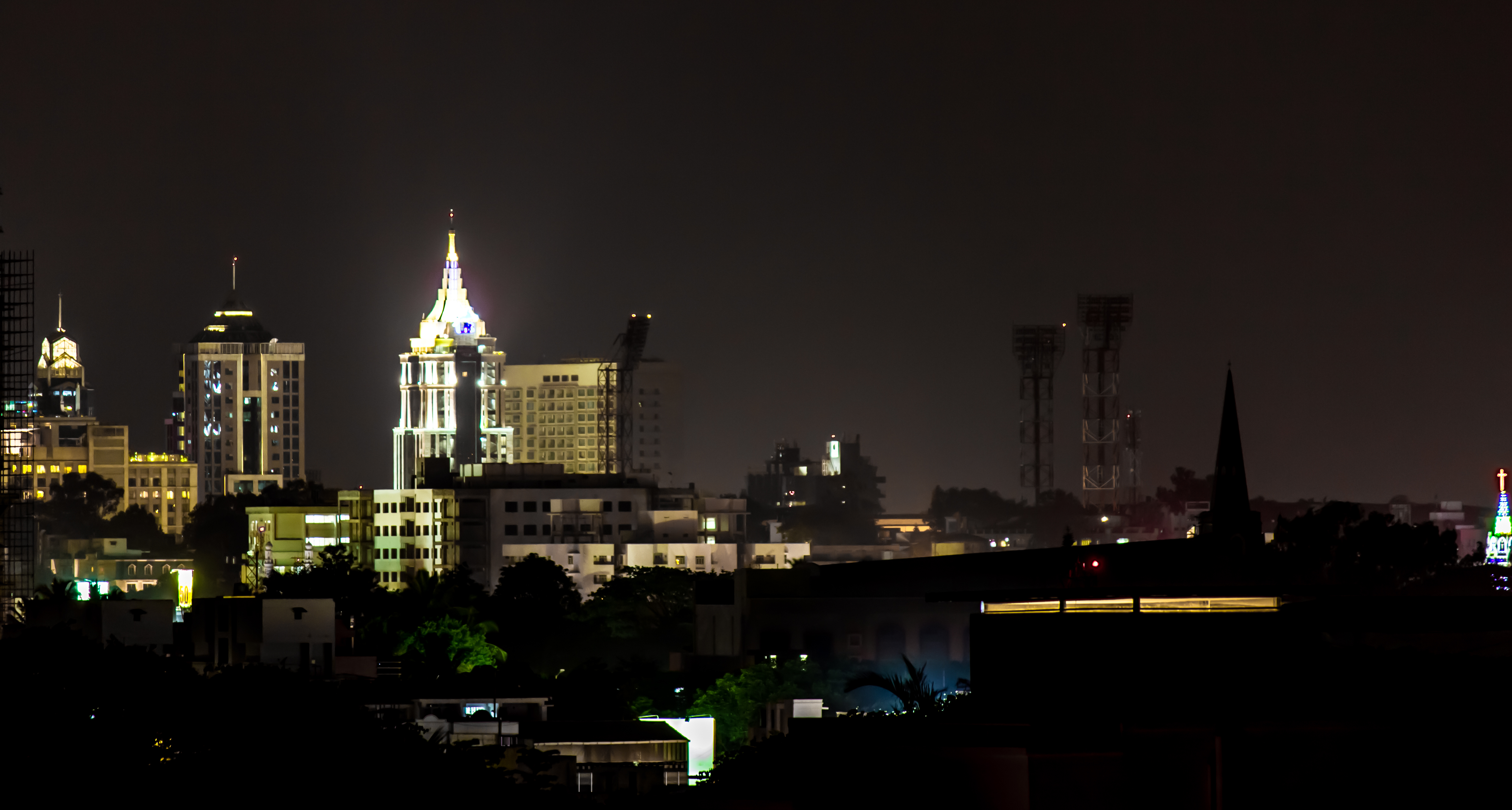
- Clockwise from top-left: Brigade Road at night, Dodda Basavana Gudi, Bangalore Palace, Skyline of Bangalore, Vidhana Soudha
- Interactive map of Bengaluru Urban district
- Coordinates: 12.970214°N 77.56029°E
- Country: India
- State: Karnataka
- Headquarters: Bengaluru
- Taluks: Bengaluru South; Bengaluru East; Bengaluru North; Bengaluru North Additional (Yelahanka); Anekal

Government
  - Type: District administration
  - Deputy Commissioner: Jagadeesha G (IAS)
  - Additional Deputy Commissioner: Jagadeesh K Naik (KAS)
  - District incharge Minister: D. K. Shivakumar

Area
  - Total: 2,196 km^{2} (848 sq mi)

Population (2011)
  - Total: 9,621,551
  - Rank: 3rd (India)
  - Density: 4,381/km^{2} (11,350/sq mi)

Languages
  - Official: Kannada
- Time zone: UTC+5:30 (IST)
- Vehicle registration: Source: Bengaluru Central (HSR Layout): KA 01; Bengaluru West (Rajajinagara): KA 02; Bengaluru East (Kasturinagara): KA 03; Bengaluru North (Yeshwanthapura): KA 04; Bangaluru South (JP Nagara 9th Phase): KA 05; Jnanabharathi (Bangalore Western Suburbs): KA 41; Yelahanka (Bangalore Northern Suburbs): KA 50; Electronic City (Bangalore Southern Suburbs): KA 51; Krishnarajapura (Bangalore Eastern Suburbs): KA 53; Shantinagara: KA 57 (Only for KSRTC under Bengaluru Division, and BMTC buses and vehicles used by officials); Chandapura (Anekal Taluk): KA 59
- GDP (PPP)(2022-23): $ 300 Billion
- Per Capita Income (PPP)(2022-23): $ 25,461
- Nominal GDP (2022-23): ₹9.48254 trillion (US$120.64 billion)
- Per Capita Income (Nominal)(2022-23 ): ₹780,321 (US$9,927.18)
- Website: Bengaluru Urban

Bengaluru Urban district is the most densely populated of the thirty-one districts that comprise the Indian state of Karnataka. It is surrounded by the Bengaluru North district (formerly known as Bengaluru Rural district) on the east and north, the Bengaluru South district (formerly known as Ramanagara district) on the west, and the Krishnagiri district of Tamil Nadu on the south.

Bangalore Urban district came into being in 1986, with the partition of the erstwhile Bangalore district into Bangalore Urban and Bangalore Rural districts. Bangalore Urban has three taluks: Bengaluru City, Yelahanka and Anekal. It has seventeen hoblies, 872 villages, eleven rural habitations, nine towns, two tier-three city and one tier-one city, administered by ninety-six Grama Panchayats, ninety-seven Taluk Panchayats, one Town Panchayat, eight Town Municipal Councils, two City Municipal Council and five City Corporations.

The district had a population of 6,537,124 of which 88.11% is urban as of 2001. As of Census 2011, its population has increased to 9,621,551, with a sex-ratio of 908 females/males, the lowest in the state and its density is 4,378 people per square km.

== List of villages ==
Villages in Bangalore Urban district
Sl No	Village/Locality Name	Taluk	Hobli
1	Adakamaranahalli	Bangalore North	Dasanapura-1
2	Aluru	Bangalore North	Dasanapura-1
3	Bettanagere	Bangalore North	Dasanapura-1
4	Bommashettihalli	Bangalore North	Dasanapura-1
5	Dasanapura	Bangalore North	Dasanapura-1
6	Gopalapura	Bangalore North	Dasanapura-1
7	Govindapura	Bangalore North	Dasanapura-1
8	Heggadadevanapura	Bangalore North	Dasanapura-1
9	Honnasandra	Bangalore North	Dasanapura-1
10	Hosahallipalya	Bangalore North	Dasanapura-1
11	Huchchanapalya	Bangalore North	Dasanapura-1
12	Huskuru	Bangalore North	Dasanapura-1
13	Kodipalya	Bangalore North	Dasanapura-1
14	Kuduregere	Bangalore North	Dasanapura-1
15	Makali	Bangalore North	Dasanapura-1
16	Mariyanapalya	Bangalore North	Dasanapura-1
17	Mattahalli	Bangalore North	Dasanapura-1
18	Muniyanapalya	Bangalore North	Dasanapura-1
19	Nagaruru	Bangalore North	Dasanapura-1
20	Naraseepura	Bangalore North	Dasanapura-1
21	Narayanappanapalya	Bangalore North	Dasanapura-1
22	Pillahalli	Bangalore North	Dasanapura-1
23	Saidamipalya	Bangalore North	Dasanapura-1
24	Sheshagirirav Palya	Bangalore North	Dasanapura-1
25	Shyamabhattarapalya	Bangalore North	Dasanapura-1
26	Thammenahalli	Bangalore North	Dasanapura-1
27	Torenagasandra	Bangalore North	Dasanapura-1
28	Totagere	Bangalore North	Dasanapura-1
29	Vaderahalli	Bangalore North	Dasanapura-1
30	A Medihalli	Bangalore North	Dasanapura-2
31	Abbagere	Bangalore North	Dasanapura-2
32	Bailukonenahalli	Bangalore North	Dasanapura-2
33	Bayyandahalli	Bangalore North	Dasanapura-2
34	Bettahalli	Bangalore North	Dasanapura-2
35	Chikkabidarakallu	Bangalore North	Dasanapura-2
36	Dombarahalli	Bangalore North	Dasanapura-2
37	Gavipalya	Bangalore North	Dasanapura-2
38	Giddenahalli	Bangalore North	Dasanapura-2
39	Gogandanahalli	Bangalore North	Dasanapura-2
40	Hanumantasagara	Bangalore North	Dasanapura-2
41	Kachohalli	Bangalore North	Dasanapura-2
42	Kadabagere	Bangalore North	Dasanapura-2
43	Kadaranahalli	Bangalore North	Dasanapura-2
44	Kammasandra	Bangalore North	Dasanapura-2
45	KH GH Lakkenahalli	Bangalore North	Dasanapura-2
46	KH GH Shreekanthapura	Bangalore North	Dasanapura-2
47	Lakshmeepura	Bangalore North	Dasanapura-2
48	Machohalli	Bangalore North	Dasanapura-2
49	Madanaykanahalli	Bangalore North	Dasanapura-2
50	Madavara	Bangalore North	Dasanapura-2
51	Siddanahosahalli	Bangalore North	Dasanapura-2
52	Totadaguddadahalli	Bangalore North	Dasanapura-2
53	Vaddarahalli	Bangalore North	Dasanapura-2
54	Avarehalli	Bangalore North	Dasanapura-3
55	Bairegowdanahalli	Bangalore North	Dasanapura-3
56	Gattisiddanahalli	Bangalore North	Dasanapura-3
57	Gejjagadahalli	Bangalore North	Dasanapura-3
58	Gowdahalli	Bangalore North	Dasanapura-3
59	Gullarapalya	Bangalore North	Dasanapura-3
60	Hullegowdanahalli	Bangalore North	Dasanapura-3
61	Hunnigere	Bangalore North	Dasanapura-3
62	Kenganahalli	Bangalore North	Dasanapura-3
63	Kittanahalli	Bangalore North	Dasanapura-3
64	Lakkenahalli	Bangalore North	Dasanapura-3
65	Mallasandra	Bangalore North	Dasanapura-3
66	Nagasandra	Bangalore North	Dasanapura-3
67	Ravutanahalli	Bangalore North	Dasanapura-3
68	Shivanapura	Bangalore North	Dasanapura-3
69	Sondekoppa	Bangalore North	Dasanapura-3
70	Vankatapura	Bangalore North	Dasanapura-3
71	Akkithimmanahalli	Bangalore North	Kasaba
72	Annipura	Bangalore North	Kasaba
73	Arekempanahalli	Bangalore North	Kasaba
74	Bangalore City Rs	Bangalore North	Kasaba
75	Barigemuddenahalli	Bangalore North	Kasaba
76	Bhoganahalli	Bangalore North	Kasaba
77	Bilekahalli	Bangalore North	Kasaba
78	Binnamangala	Bangalore North	Kasaba
79	Bogenahalli	Bangalore North	Kasaba
80	Byadarahalli	Bangalore North	Kasaba
81	Byatarayanapura	Bangalore North	Kasaba
82	Chikkamaranahalli	Bangalore North	Kasaba
83	Danduupparahalli	Bangalore North	Kasaba
84	Doddabailakhane	Bangalore North	Kasaba
85	Doddabailakhane	Bangalore North	Kasaba
86	Doddakunte	Bangalore North	Kasaba
87	Domlur	Bangalore North	Kasaba
88	Dukanahalli	Bangalore North	Kasaba
89	Dyavasandra	Bangalore North	Kasaba
90	Gangenahalli	Bangalore North	Kasaba
91	Gavipura	Bangalore North	Kasaba
92	Gerahalli	Bangalore North	Kasaba
93	Gurihoideyuvamydana	Bangalore North	Kasaba
94	Guttahalli	Bangalore North	Kasaba
95	Hanumanthapura	Bangalore North	Kasaba
96	Jakkasandra	Bangalore North	Kasaba
97	Jedahalli	Bangalore North	Kasaba
98	Karanjebeesanahalli	Bangalore North	Kasaba
99	Karithimmanahalli	Bangalore North	Kasaba
100	Kempambudikere	Bangalore North	Kasaba
101	Kempapura Agrahara	Bangalore North	Kasaba
102	Lalbagh	Bangalore North	Kasaba
103	Malenahalli	Bangalore North	Kasaba
104	Matadahalli	Bangalore North	Kasaba
105	Matthikere	Bangalore North	Kasaba
106	Mavalli	Bangalore North	Kasaba
107	Neelasandra	Bangalore North	Kasaba
108	Rajmahal	Bangalore North	Kasaba
109	Ranganathapura	Bangalore North	Kasaba
110	Savarline	Bangalore North	Kasaba
111	Siddapura	Bangalore North	Kasaba
112	Sonnenahalli	Bangalore North	Kasaba
113	Sunkenahalli	Bangalore North	Kasaba
114	Tata Research Institute	Bangalore North	Kasaba
115	Ulsuru	Bangalore North	Kasaba
116	Vyalikaval	Bangalore North	Kasaba
117	Waterworks	Bangalore North	Kasaba
118	Byateguttepalya	Bangalore North	Kasaba-1
119	Devarajeevanahalli	Bangalore North	Kasaba-1
120	Hennuru	Bangalore North	Kasaba-1
121	Kadugondanahalli	Bangalore North	Kasaba-1
122	Kacharakanahalli	Bangalore North	Kasaba-1
123	Lingarajapura	Bangalore North	Kasaba-1
124	Nagavara	Bangalore North	Kasaba-1
125	Bhupasandra	Bangalore North	Kasaba-2
126	Cholanaykanahalli	Bangalore North	Kasaba-2
127	Geddalahalli	Bangalore North	Kasaba-2
128	Guddadahalli	Bangalore North	Kasaba-2
129	Hebbala	Bangalore North	Kasaba-2
130	Hebbala Amani Kere	Bangalore North	Kasaba-2
131	Kaval Bairasandra	Bangalore North	Kasaba-2
132	Lottegollahalli	Bangalore North	Kasaba-2
133	Nagashettihalli	Bangalore North	Kasaba-2
134	Purnapura	Bangalore North	Kasaba-2
135	Shampura	Bangalore North	Kasaba-2
136	Vishvanathanagenahalli	Bangalore North	Kasaba-2
137	Abbagere	Bangalore North	Yashavantapura-1
138	Bagalagunte	Bangalore North	Yashavantapura-1
139	Chikka Banavara	Bangalore North	Yashavantapura-1
140	Chikkasandra	Bangalore North	Yashavantapura-1
141	Doddabidarakallu	Bangalore North	Yashavantapura-1
142	Ganigarahalli	Bangalore North	Yashavantapura-1
143	Jalahalli	Bangalore North	Yashavantapura-1
144	Kammagondanahalli	Bangalore North	Yashavantapura-1
145	Keregulladahalli	Bangalore North	Yashavantapura-1
146	Laggere	Bangalore North	Yashavantapura-1
147	Lakshmeepura	Bangalore North	Yashavantapura-1
148	Mallasandra	Bangalore North	Yashavantapura-1
149	Myadarahalli	Bangalore North	Yashavantapura-1
150	Myakala Chennahalli	Bangalore North	Yashavantapura-1
151	Nagasandra	Bangalore North	Yashavantapura-1
152	Peenya	Bangalore North	Yashavantapura-1
153	Seededahalli	Bangalore North	Yashavantapura-1
154	Shettihalli	Bangalore North	Yashavantapura-1
155	Somashettihalli	Bangalore North	Yashavantapura-1
156	Tanneeranahalli	Bangalore North	Yashavantapura-1
157	Tirumalapura	Bangalore North	Yashavantapura-1
158	Andrahalli	Bangalore North	Yashavantapura-2
159	Chokkasandra	Bangalore North	Yashavantapura-2
160	Dasarahalli	Bangalore North	Yashavantapura-2
161	Giddadakonenahalli	Bangalore North	Yashavantapura-2
162	Hegganahalli	Bangalore North	Yashavantapura-2
163	Herohalli	Bangalore North	Yashavantapura-2
164	Hosalli Gollarapalya	Bangalore North	Yashavantapura-2
165	Hullalu	Bangalore North	Yashavantapura-2
166	Kannalli	Bangalore North	Yashavantapura-2
167	Karivabanahalli	Bangalore North	Yashavantapura-2
168	Kodigehalli	Bangalore North	Yashavantapura-2
169	Lingadheeranahalli	Bangalore North	Yashavantapura-2
170	Malagalu	Bangalore North	Yashavantapura-2
171	Mallattahalli	Bangalore North	Yashavantapura-2
172	Manganahalli	Bangalore North	Yashavantapura-2
173	Nagarabhavi	Bangalore North	Yashavantapura-2
174	Nelagadaranahalli	Bangalore North	Yashavantapura-2
175	Sajjepalya	Bangalore North	Yashavantapura-2
176	Saneguruvanahalli	Bangalore North	Yashavantapura-2
177	Sheegehalli	Bangalore North	Yashavantapura-2
178	Shreegandhakaval	Bangalore North	Yashavantapura-2
179	Agraharadasarahalli	Bangalore North	Yashavantapura
180	Gangondanahalli	Bangalore North	Yashavantapura
181	Hosahalli	Bangalore North	Yashavantapura
182	Kethamaranahalli	Bangalore North	Yashavantapura
183	Shivanahalli	Bangalore North	Yashavantapura
184	Yashavantapura	Bangalore North	Yashavantapura
185	Aivarakandapura	Bangalore North (Additional)	Hesaraghatta-1
186	Bilijaji	Bangalore North (Additional)	Hesaraghatta-1
187	Byalakere	Bangalore North (Additional)	Hesaraghatta-1
188	Dasanahalli	Bangalore North (Additional)	Hesaraghatta-1
189	Dibburu	Bangalore North (Additional)	Hesaraghatta-1
190	Guniagrahara	Bangalore North (Additional)	Hesaraghatta-1
191	Hesaraghatta	Bangalore North (Additional)	Hesaraghatta-1
192	Huralichikkanahalli	Bangalore North (Additional)	Hesaraghatta-1
193	Ittegalapura	Bangalore North (Additional)	Hesaraghatta-1
194	Kalatammanahalli	Bangalore North (Additional)	Hesaraghatta-1
195	Kalenahalli	Bangalore North (Additional)	Hesaraghatta-1
196	Kasaghattapura	Bangalore North (Additional)	Hesaraghatta-1
197	Kempapura	Bangalore North (Additional)	Hesaraghatta-1
198	Kodige Tirumalapura	Bangalore North (Additional)	Hesaraghatta-1
199	Koluvarayanahalli	Bangalore North (Additional)	Hesaraghatta-1
200	Kondashettihalli	Bangalore North (Additional)	Hesaraghatta-1
201	Kumbarahalli	Bangalore North (Additional)	Hesaraghatta-1
202	Lingarajasagara	Bangalore North (Additional)	Hesaraghatta-1
203	Madugirihalli	Bangalore North (Additional)	Hesaraghatta-1
204	Mattakuru	Bangalore North (Additional)	Hesaraghatta-1
205	Sasuveghatta	Bangalore North (Additional)	Hesaraghatta-1
206	Shivakote	Bangalore North (Additional)	Hesaraghatta-1
207	Suladevanahalli	Bangalore North (Additional)	Hesaraghatta-1
208	Tammarasanahalli	Bangalore North (Additional)	Hesaraghatta-1
209	Tarabanahalli	Bangalore North (Additional)	Hesaraghatta-1
210	Addevishvanathapura	Bangalore North (Additional)	Hesaraghatta-2
211	Addiganahalli	Bangalore North (Additional)	Hesaraghatta-2
212	Amanimarasandra	Bangalore North (Additional)	Hesaraghatta-2
213	Arakere	Bangalore North (Additional)	Hesaraghatta-2
214	Bairapura	Bangalore North (Additional)	Hesaraghatta-2
215	Budamanahalli	Bangalore North (Additional)	Hesaraghatta-2
216	Byata	Bangalore North (Additional)	Hesaraghatta-2
217	Challihalli	Bangalore North (Additional)	Hesaraghatta-2
218	Channasandra	Bangalore North (Additional)	Hesaraghatta-2
219	Chokkanahalli	Bangalore North (Additional)	Hesaraghatta-2
220	Haniyuru	Bangalore North (Additional)	Hesaraghatta-2
221	Kakkehalli	Bangalore North (Additional)	Hesaraghatta-2
222	Kakolu	Bangalore North (Additional)	Hesaraghatta-2
223	Kamakshipura	Bangalore North (Additional)	Hesaraghatta-2
224	Kedatanamale	Bangalore North (Additional)	Hesaraghatta-2
225	Krishnarajapura	Bangalore North (Additional)	Hesaraghatta-2
226	Linganahalli	Bangalore North (Additional)	Hesaraghatta-2
227	Lingarajapura	Bangalore North (Additional)	Hesaraghatta-2
228	Madappanahalli	Bangalore North (Additional)	Hesaraghatta-2
229	Mailappanahalli	Bangalore North (Additional)	Hesaraghatta-2
230	Mavallipura	Bangalore North (Additional)	Hesaraghatta-2
231	Muttagadahalli	Bangalore North (Additional)	Hesaraghatta-2
232	Nellukunte	Bangalore North (Additional)	Hesaraghatta-2
233	Rajanakunte	Bangalore North (Additional)	Hesaraghatta-2
234	Sadenahalli	Bangalore North (Additional)	Hesaraghatta-2
235	Seethakempanahalli	Bangalore North (Additional)	Hesaraghatta-2
236	Sheeresandra	Bangalore North (Additional)	Hesaraghatta-2
237	Shreeramanahalli	Bangalore North (Additional)	Hesaraghatta-2
238	Shyanuboganahalli	Bangalore North (Additional)	Hesaraghatta-2
239	Sonnenahalli	Bangalore North (Additional)	Hesaraghatta-2
240	Suradenapura	Bangalore North (Additional)	Hesaraghatta-2
241	Begur	Bangalore North (Additional)	Jala-1
242	Billamaranahalli	Bangalore North (Additional)	Jala-1
243	Channahalli	Bangalore North (Additional)	Jala-1
244	Chikkajala	Bangalore North (Additional)	Jala-1
245	Chikkanahalli	Bangalore North (Additional)	Jala-1
246	Chokkanahalli	Bangalore North (Additional)	Jala-1
247	Doddajala	Bangalore North (Additional)	Jala-1
248	Doddajala Amanikere	Bangalore North (Additional)	Jala-1
249	Huttanahalli	Bangalore North (Additional)	Jala-1
250	Maranaykanahalli	Bangalore North (Additional)	Jala-1
251	Meenakunte	Bangalore North (Additional)	Jala-1
252	Meesiganahalli	Bangalore North (Additional)	Jala-1
253	Muttugadahalli	Bangalore North (Additional)	Jala-1
254	Navaratnagrahara	Bangalore North (Additional)	Jala-1
255	Shettigere	Bangalore North (Additional)	Jala-1
256	Tarabanahalli	Bangalore North (Additional)	Jala-1
257	Baiyyappanahalli	Bangalore North (Additional)	Jala-2
258	Bettahalasuru	Bangalore North (Additional)	Jala-2
259	Gadenahalli	Bangalore North (Additional)	Jala-2
260	Hosahalli	Bangalore North (Additional)	Jala-2
261	Hunasamaranahalli	Bangalore North (Additional)	Jala-2
262	Kadaganahalli	Bangalore North (Additional)	Jala-2
263	Kattigenahalli	Bangalore North (Additional)	Jala-2
264	Kuduregere	Bangalore North (Additional)	Jala-2
265	Nellukunte	Bangalore North (Additional)	Jala-2
266	Papanahalli	Bangalore North (Additional)	Jala-2
267	Sathanur	Bangalore North (Additional)	Jala-2
268	Sonnappanahalli	Bangalore North (Additional)	Jala-2
269	Sugguta	Bangalore North (Additional)	Jala-2
270	Tarahunase	Bangalore North (Additional)	Jala-2
271	Timmasandra	Bangalore North (Additional)	Jala-2
272	Arebinnamangala	Bangalore North (Additional)	Jala-3
273	B K Halli	Bangalore North (Additional)	Jala-3
274	B K Halli Amanikere	Bangalore North (Additional)	Jala-3
275	Bagalur	Bangalore North (Additional)	Jala-3
276	Boyilahalli	Bangalore North (Additional)	Jala-3
277	Chagalatti	Bangalore North (Additional)	Jala-3
278	Chalumekunte	Bangalore North (Additional)	Jala-3
279	Dasanaykanahalli	Bangalore North (Additional)	Jala-3
280	Dummanahalli	Bangalore North (Additional)	Jala-3
281	EM Hosahalli	Bangalore North (Additional)	Jala-3
282	Gollahalli	Bangalore North (Additional)	Jala-3
283	Huvinaykanahalli	Bangalore North (Additional)	Jala-3
284	Mahadeva Kodigehalli	Bangalore North (Additional)	Jala-3
285	Mailanahalli	Bangalore North (Additional)	Jala-3
286	Maralakunte	Bangalore North (Additional)	Jala-3
287	Marasandra	Bangalore North (Additional)	Jala-3
288	Marenahalli	Bangalore North (Additional)	Jala-3
289	Palya	Bangalore North (Additional)	Jala-3
290	Singahalli	Bangalore North (Additional)	Jala-3
291	Unasuru	Bangalore North (Additional)	Jala-3
292	Anantapura	Bangalore North (Additional)	Yelahanka-1
293	Avalahalli	Bangalore North (Additional)	Yelahanka-1
294	Bellihalli	Bangalore North (Additional)	Yelahanka-1
295	Gantiganahalli	Bangalore North (Additional)	Yelahanka-1
296	Govindapura	Bangalore North (Additional)	Yelahanka-1
297	Harohalli	Bangalore North (Additional)	Yelahanka-1
298	Honnenahalli	Bangalore North (Additional)	Yelahanka-1
299	Kenchenahalli	Bangalore North (Additional)	Yelahanka-1
300	Kogilu	Bangalore North (Additional)	Yelahanka-1
301	Krishnasagara	Bangalore North (Additional)	Yelahanka-1
302	Lakshmisagara	Bangalore North (Additional)	Yelahanka-1
303	Manchenahalli	Bangalore North (Additional)	Yelahanka-1
304	Mandalakunte	Bangalore North (Additional)	Yelahanka-1
305	Muddenahalli	Bangalore North (Additional)	Yelahanka-1
306	Nagadasanahalli	Bangalore North (Additional)	Yelahanka-1
307	Puttenahalli	Bangalore North (Additional)	Yelahanka-1
308	Ramagondanahalli	Bangalore North (Additional)	Yelahanka-1
309	Shivanahalli	Bangalore North (Additional)	Yelahanka-1
310	Shreenivasapura	Bangalore North (Additional)	Yelahanka-1
311	Singanaykanahalli	Bangalore North (Additional)	Yelahanka-1
312	Singanaykanahalli Amanikera	Bangalore North (Additional)	Yelahanka-1
313	Tirumenahalli	Bangalore North (Additional)	Yelahanka-1
314	Vaderapura	Bangalore North (Additional)	Yelahanka-1
315	Vasudevapura	Bangalore North (Additional)	Yelahanka-1
316	Venkatala	Bangalore North (Additional)	Yelahanka-1
317	Yelahanka	Bangalore North (Additional)	Yelahanka-1
318	Yelahanka A Kere	Bangalore North (Additional)	Yelahanka-1
319	Agrahara	Bangalore North (Additional)	Yelahanka-2
320	Allalasandra	Bangalore North (Additional)	Yelahanka-2
321	Byatarayapura	Bangalore North (Additional)	Yelahanka-2
322	Chikkabommasandra	Bangalore North (Additional)	Yelahanka-2
323	Chokkanahalli	Bangalore North (Additional)	Yelahanka-2
324	Gastikempanahalli	Bangalore North (Additional)	Yelahanka-2
325	Jakkur	Bangalore North (Additional)	Yelahanka-2
326	Jakkur Plantation	Bangalore North (Additional)	Yelahanka-2
327	Sampigehalli	Bangalore North (Additional)	Yelahanka-2
328	Shreeramapura	Bangalore North (Additional)	Yelahanka-2
329	Tindlu	Bangalore North (Additional)	Yelahanka-2
330	Venkateshapura	Bangalore North (Additional)	Yelahanka-2
331	Amrutahalli	Bangalore North (Additional)	Yelahanka-3
332	Atturu	Bangalore North (Additional)	Yelahanka-3
333	Che B Kaval	Bangalore North (Additional)	Yelahanka-3
334	Chikkabettadahalli	Bangalore North (Additional)	Yelahanka-3
335	Doddabettadahalli	Bangalore North (Additional)	Yelahanka-3
336	Doddabommasandra	Bangalore North (Additional)	Yelahanka-3
337	Kempanahalli	Bangalore North (Additional)	Yelahanka-3
338	Kempapura	Bangalore North (Additional)	Yelahanka-3
339	Kodigehalli	Bangalore North (Additional)	Yelahanka-3
340	Kotihosahalli	Bangalore North (Additional)	Yelahanka-3
341	Mediagrahara	Bangalore North (Additional)	Yelahanka-3
342	Naraseepura	Bangalore North (Additional)	Yelahanka-3
343	Ramachandrapura	Bangalore North (Additional)	Yelahanka-3
344	Shyamarajapura	Bangalore North (Additional)	Yelahanka-3
345	Singapura	Bangalore North (Additional)	Yelahanka-3
346	Vaderahalli	Bangalore North (Additional)	Yelahanka-3
347	Veerasagara	Bangalore North (Additional)	Yelahanka-3
348	J B Kaval	Bangalore North (Additional)	Yelahanka
349	Peenya Plantation	Bangalore North (Additional)	Yelahanka
350	Kadugodi Plantation	Bangalore East	Bidarahalli
351	Bandapura	Bangalore East	Bidarahalli-1
352	Belatturu	Bangalore East	Bidarahalli-1
353	Bendiganahalli	Bangalore East	Bidarahalli-1
354	Bidare Agrahara	Bangalore East	Bidarahalli-1
355	Bommenahalli	Bangalore East	Bidarahalli-1
356	Channasandra	Bangalore East	Bidarahalli-1
357	Chikkabanahalli	Bangalore East	Bidarahalli-1
358	Doddabanahalli	Bangalore East	Bidarahalli-1
359	Dommasandra	Bangalore East	Bidarahalli-1
360	Goravigere	Bangalore East	Bidarahalli-1
361	Hancharahalli	Bangalore East	Bidarahalli-1
362	Huskuru	Bangalore East	Bidarahalli-1
363	Kadugodi	Bangalore East	Bidarahalli-1
364	Kannamangala	Bangalore East	Bidarahalli-1
365	Katannalluru	Bangalore East	Bidarahalli-1
366	Khajisonnenahalli	Bangalore East	Bidarahalli-1
367	Kodigehalli	Bangalore East	Bidarahalli-1
368	Konadasapura	Bangalore East	Bidarahalli-1
369	Kumbena Agrahara	Bangalore East	Bidarahalli-1
370	Lagumenahalli	Bangalore East	Bidarahalli-1
371	Nimbekayipura	Bangalore East	Bidarahalli-1
372	Raghuvanahalli	Bangalore East	Bidarahalli-1
373	Sheegehalli	Bangalore East	Bidarahalli-1
374	Aduru	Bangalore East	Bidarahalli-2
375	Avalahalli	Bangalore East	Bidarahalli-2
376	Baiyyappanahalli	Bangalore East	Bidarahalli-2
377	Bhattarahalli	Bangalore East	Bidarahalli-2
378	Bidarahalli	Bangalore East	Bidarahalli-2
379	Cheemasandra	Bangalore East	Bidarahalli-2
380	Chikkasandra	Bangalore East	Bidarahalli-2
381	Doddenahalli	Bangalore East	Bidarahalli-2
382	Gundur	Bangalore East	Bidarahalli-2
383	Halehalli	Bangalore East	Bidarahalli-2
384	Hirandahalli	Bangalore East	Bidarahalli-2
385	Jyotipura	Bangalore East	Bidarahalli-2
386	Kammasandra	Bangalore East	Bidarahalli-2
387	Kattugollahalli	Bangalore East	Bidarahalli-2
388	Kittaganuru	Bangalore East	Bidarahalli-2
389	Kurudu Sonnenahalli	Bangalore East	Bidarahalli-2
390	Mandur	Bangalore East	Bidarahalli-2
391	Maragondanahalli	Bangalore East	Bidarahalli-2
392	Medahalli	Bangalore East	Bidarahalli-2
393	Shrungaripura	Bangalore East	Bidarahalli-2
394	Tirumenahalli	Bangalore East	Bidarahalli-2
395	Vanajenahalli	Bangalore East	Bidarahalli-2
396	Varanasi	Bangalore East	Bidarahalli-2
397	Veerenahalli	Bangalore East	Bidarahalli-2
398	Anagalapura	Bangalore East	Bidarahalli-3
399	Bandebommasandra	Bangalore East	Bidarahalli-3
400	Bhairati	Bangalore East	Bidarahalli-3
401	Bilishivale	Bangalore East	Bidarahalli-3
402	Chikkagubbi	Bangalore East	Bidarahalli-3
403	Doddagubbi	Bangalore East	Bidarahalli-3
404	Huvinani	Bangalore East	Bidarahalli-3
405	Kadagrahara	Bangalore East	Bidarahalli-3
406	Kadusonnappanahalli	Bangalore East	Bidarahalli-3
407	Kannur	Bangalore East	Bidarahalli-3
408	Mittaganahalli	Bangalore East	Bidarahalli-3
409	Nadagowda Gollahalli	Bangalore East	Bidarahalli-3
410	Rampura	Bangalore East	Bidarahalli-3
411	Vaderahalli	Bangalore East	Bidarahalli-3
412	Yarappanahalli	Bangalore East	Bidarahalli-3
413	Baiyyappanahalli	Bangalore East	Krishnarajapuram-1
414	Banaswadi	Bangalore East	Krishnarajapuram-1
415	Basavanapura	Bangalore East	Krishnarajapuram-1
416	Benniganahalli	Bangalore East	Krishnarajapuram-1
417	Binnamangala Manavarthe Kaval	Bangalore East	Krishnarajapuram-1
418	Chelakere	Bangalore East	Krishnarajapuram-1
419	Devasandra	Bangalore East	Krishnarajapuram-1
420	Kowdenahalli	Bangalore East	Krishnarajapuram-1
421	Krishnarajapuram	Bangalore East	Krishnarajapuram-1
422	Mahadevapura	Bangalore East	Krishnarajapuram-1
423	Sannatammanahalli	Bangalore East	Krishnarajapuram-1
424	Sheegehalli	Bangalore East	Krishnarajapuram-1
425	Vijanapura	Bangalore East	Krishnarajapuram-1
426	Amani Bairatikhane	Bangalore East	Krishnarajapuram-2
427	Dasarahalli	Bangalore East	Krishnarajapuram-2
428	Geddalahalli	Bangalore East	Krishnarajapuram-2
429	Horamavu	Bangalore East	Krishnarajapuram-2
430	Horamavu Agara	Bangalore East	Krishnarajapuram-2
431	K Channasandra	Bangalore East	Krishnarajapuram-2
432	K Narayanapura	Bangalore East	Krishnarajapuram-2
433	Kalkere	Bangalore East	Krishnarajapuram-2
434	Kottanuru	Bangalore East	Krishnarajapuram-2
435	Kyalasanahalli	Bangalore East	Krishnarajapuram-2
436	Nagareshvara Nagenahalli	Bangalore East	Krishnarajapuram-2
437	Rachenahalli	Bangalore East	Krishnarajapuram-2
438	Thanisandra	Bangalore East	Krishnarajapuram-2
439	Chinnappanahalli	Bangalore East	Krishnarajapuram-3
440	Hagaduru	Bangalore East	Krishnarajapuram-3
441	Hoodi	Bangalore East	Krishnarajapuram-3
442	Kodigehalli	Bangalore East	Krishnarajapuram-3
443	Kundalahalli	Bangalore East	Krishnarajapuram-3
444	Nagondanahalli	Bangalore East	Krishnarajapuram-3
445	Nallurahalli	Bangalore East	Krishnarajapuram-3
446	Pattanduru Agrahara	Bangalore East	Krishnarajapuram-3
447	R Narayanapura	Bangalore East	Krishnarajapuram-3
448	Sadaramangala	Bangalore East	Krishnarajapuram-3
449	Sonnenahalli	Bangalore East	Krishnarajapuram-3
450	Whitefield	Bangalore East	Krishnarajapuram-3
451	B Narayanapura	Bangalore East	Mahadevapura
452	Baiyyappanahalli	Bangalore East	Mahadevapura
453	Baiyyappanahalli Manavarthe Kaval	Bangalore East	Mahadevapura
454	Benniganahalli	Bangalore East	Mahadevapura
455	Binnamangala Manavarthe Kaval	Bangalore East	Mahadevapura
456	Mahadevapura	Bangalore East	Mahadevapura
457	Vijanapura	Bangalore East	Mahadevapura
458	Bairasandra	Bangalore East	Marathahalli
459	Beluru Nagasandra	Bangalore East	Marathahalli
460	Doddanekkundi	Bangalore East	Marathahalli
461	Kaggadasanapura	Bangalore East	Marathahalli
462	Kempapura	Bangalore East	Marathahalli
463	Kodihalli	Bangalore East	Marathahalli
464	Konena Agrahara	Bangalore East	Marathahalli
465	Marathahalli	Bangalore East	Marathahalli
466	Tippasandra	Bangalore East	Marathahalli
467	Vibhutipura	Bangalore East	Marathahalli
468	Amani Bellandurukhane	Bangalore East	Varthur-1
469	Bairasandra	Bangalore East	Varthur-1
470	Beluru	Bangalore East	Varthur-1
471	Beluru Nagasandra	Bangalore East	Varthur-1
472	Challaghatta	Bangalore East	Varthur-1
473	Doddanekkundi	Bangalore East	Varthur-1
474	Gunjur	Bangalore East	Varthur-1
475	Kachamaranahalli	Bangalore East	Varthur-1
476	Kempapura	Bangalore East	Varthur-1
477	Khane Kandaya	Bangalore East	Varthur-1
478	Kodihalli	Bangalore East	Varthur-1
479	Konena Agrahara	Bangalore East	Varthur-1
480	Marathahalli	Bangalore East	Varthur-1
481	Munnekolalu	Bangalore East	Varthur-1
482	Ramagondanahalli	Bangalore East	Varthur-1
483	Siddapura	Bangalore East	Varthur-1
484	Sorahunase	Bangalore East	Varthur-1
485	Tippasandra	Bangalore East	Varthur-1
486	Tobarahalli	Bangalore East	Varthur-1
487	Valepura	Bangalore East	Varthur-1
488	Varthur	Bangalore East	Varthur-1
489	Vibhutipura	Bangalore East	Varthur-1
490	Yamalur	Bangalore East	Varthur-1
491	Ambaleepura	Bangalore East	Varthur-2
492	Balagere	Bangalore East	Varthur-2
493	Bellandur	Bangalore East	Varthur-2
494	Bhoganahalli	Bangalore East	Varthur-2
495	Chikkabellandur	Bangalore East	Varthur-2
496	Chikkanayakanahalli	Bangalore East	Varthur-2
497	Chikkannalli	Bangalore East	Varthur-2
498	Devarabeesanahalli	Bangalore East	Varthur-2
499	Doddakannalli	Bangalore East	Varthur-2
500	Hadosiddapura	Bangalore East	Varthur-2
501	Halanayakanahalli	Bangalore East	Varthur-2
502	Haraluru	Bangalore East	Varthur-2
503	Junnasandra	Bangalore East	Varthur-2
504	Kadubeesanahalli	Bangalore East	Varthur-2
505	Kaikondrahalli	Bangalore East	Varthur-2
506	Kariyammana Agrahara	Bangalore East	Varthur-2
507	Kasavanahalli	Bangalore East	Varthur-2
508	Kodati	Bangalore East	Varthur-2
509	Mulluru	Bangalore East	Varthur-2
510	Panathur	Bangalore East	Varthur-2
511	Sulikunte	Bangalore East	Varthur-2
512	Adugodi	Bangalore South	Begur-1
513	Agara	Bangalore South	Begur-1
514	Ejipura	Bangalore South	Begur-1
515	Ibbalur	Bangalore South	Begur-1
516	Jakkasandra	Bangalore South	Begur-1
517	Koramangala	Bangalore South	Begur-1
518	Lakkasandra	Bangalore South	Begur-1
519	Madivala	Bangalore South	Begur-1
520	Rupena Agrahara	Bangalore South	Begur-1
521	Shreenivagilu	Bangalore South	Begur-1
522	Shreenivagilu Kere	Bangalore South	Begur-1
523	Tavarekere	Bangalore South	Begur-1
524	Vankojirav Khane	Bangalore South	Begur-1
525	Basapura	Bangalore South	Begur-2
526	Beratena Agrahara	Bangalore South	Begur-2
527	Bettadasanapura	Bangalore South	Begur-2
528	Bommanahalli	Bangalore South	Begur-2
529	Chikkatoguru	Bangalore South	Begur-2
530	Doddanagamangala	Bangalore South	Begur-2
531	Doddatoguru	Bangalore South	Begur-2
532	Ellukunte	Bangalore South	Begur-2
533	Haralukunte	Bangalore South	Begur-2
534	Hongasandra	Bangalore South	Begur-2
535	Kodichikkanahalli	Bangalore South	Begur-2
536	Konappana Agrahara	Bangalore South	Begur-2
537	Naganathapura	Bangalore South	Begur-2
538	Parappana Agrahara	Bangalore South	Begur-2
539	Singasandra	Bangalore South	Begur-2
540	Vittasandra	Bangalore South	Begur-2
541	Arakere	Bangalore South	Begur-3
542	Basavanapura	Bangalore South	Begur-3
543	Begur	Bangalore South	Begur-3
544	Bilekahalli	Bangalore South	Begur-3
545	Chandrashekharapura	Bangalore South	Begur-3
546	Devarachikkanahalli	Bangalore South	Begur-3
547	Elenahalli	Bangalore South	Begur-3
548	Hommadevanahalli	Bangalore South	Begur-3
549	Hulimavu	Bangalore South	Begur-3
550	Kalena Agrahara	Bangalore South	Begur-3
551	Kammanahalli	Bangalore South	Begur-3
552	Mailasandra	Bangalore South	Begur-3
553	Nyanappanahalli	Bangalore South	Begur-3
554	Nyenappanashetti	Bangalore South	Begur-3
555	Sarakki Agrahara	Bangalore South	Begur-3
556	Sonnenahalli	Bangalore South	Kengeri
557	B R Sagara	Bangalore South	Kengeri-1
558	Chudenapura	Bangalore South	Kengeri-1
559	Deevatigeramanahalli	Bangalore South	Kengeri-1
560	Ganakallu	Bangalore South	Kengeri-1
561	K Krishnasagara	Bangalore South	Kengeri-1
562	Kenchanapura	Bangalore South	Kengeri-1
563	Kengeri	Bangalore South	Kengeri-1
564	Kommaghatta	Bangalore South	Kengeri-1
565	Nagadevanahalli	Bangalore South	Kengeri-1
566	Nayandahalli	Bangalore South	Kengeri-1
567	Pantarapalya	Bangalore South	Kengeri-1
568	Ramasandra	Bangalore South	Kengeri-1
569	Sonnenahalli	Bangalore South	Kengeri-1
570	Sulikere	Bangalore South	Kengeri-1
571	Valagerahalli	Bangalore South	Kengeri-1
572	Bheemanakuppe	Bangalore South	Kengeri-2
573	Challaghatta	Bangalore South	Kengeri-2
574	Chinnakurchi	Bangalore South	Kengeri-2
575	M Krishnasagara	Bangalore South	Kengeri-2
576	Gonipura	Bangalore South	Kengeri-2
577	Hampapura	Bangalore South	Kengeri-2
578	Kambipura	Bangalore South	Kengeri-2
579	Kaniminike	Bangalore South	Kengeri-2
580	Krishnarajapura	Bangalore South	Kengeri-2
581	Kumbalgodu	Bangalore South	Kengeri-2
582	Maligondanahalli	Bangalore South	Kengeri-2
583	Maragondanahalli	Bangalore South	Kengeri-2
584	Ramohalli	Bangalore South	Kengeri-2
585	Sheegehalli	Bangalore South	Kengeri-2
586	Tippur	Bangalore South	Kengeri-2
587	Vasantanahalli	Bangalore South	Kengeri-2
588	Agara	Bangalore South	Kengeri-3
589	Badamanavarthekaval	Bangalore South	Kengeri-3
590	Devagere	Bangalore South	Kengeri-3
591	Doddabele	Bangalore South	Kengeri-3
592	Gangasandra	Bangalore South	Kengeri-3
593	Gudimavu	Bangalore South	Kengeri-3
594	Hammigepura	Bangalore South	Kengeri-3
595	K Gollahalli	Bangalore South	Kengeri-3
596	Kumbalgodu Gollahalli	Bangalore South	Kengeri-3
597	Lingadeeranahalli	Bangalore South	Kengeri-3
598	Rachanamadu	Bangalore South	Kengeri-3
599	Sompura	Bangalore South	Kengeri-3
600	Tagachaguppe	Bangalore South	Kengeri-3
601	Varahasandra	Bangalore South	Kengeri-3
602	Venkatapura	Bangalore South	Kengeri-3
603	Ajjanahalli	Bangalore South	Tavarekere-1
604	Chikkanahalli	Bangalore South	Tavarekere-1
605	Cholanayakanahalli	Bangalore South	Tavarekere-1
606	Dodderi	Bangalore South	Tavarekere-1
607	Gangappanahalli	Bangalore South	Tavarekere-1
608	Huluvenahalli	Bangalore South	Tavarekere-1
609	Kempagondanahalli	Bangalore South	Tavarekere-1
610	Kurubarapalya	Bangalore South	Tavarekere-1
611	Madapattana	Bangalore South	Tavarekere-1
612	Tavakadahalli	Bangalore South	Tavarekere-1
613	Thippagondanahalli	Bangalore South	Tavarekere-1
614	Vadahalli	Bangalore South	Tavarekere-1
615	Baichaguppe	Bangalore South	Tavarekere-2
616	Channenahalli	Bangalore South	Tavarekere-2
617	Devamachohalli	Bangalore South	Tavarekere-2
618	Ganakallu	Bangalore South	Tavarekere-2
619	Gangenahalli	Bangalore South	Tavarekere-2
620	Honnaganahatti	Bangalore South	Tavarekere-2
621	Jogerahalli	Bangalore South	Tavarekere-2
622	Kurubarahalli	Bangalore South	Tavarekere-2
623	Marenahalli	Bangalore South	Tavarekere-2
624	Naganahalli	Bangalore South	Tavarekere-2
625	Peddanapalya	Bangalore South	Tavarekere-2
626	Tavarekere	Bangalore South	Tavarekere-2
627	Varthur	Bangalore South	Tavarekere-2
628	Varthur Narasipura	Bangalore South	Tavarekere-2
629	Yalachaguppe	Bangalore South	Tavarekere-2
630	Yalachaguppe Rampura	Bangalore South	Tavarekere-2
631	Byalalu	Bangalore South	Tavarekere-3
632	Chikkalluru	Bangalore South	Tavarekere-3
633	Chikkaluru Rampura	Bangalore South	Tavarekere-3
634	Chikkaluru Venkatapura	Bangalore South	Tavarekere-3
635	Chunchanakuppe	Bangalore South	Tavarekere-3
636	Doddamaranahalli	Bangalore South	Tavarekere-3
637	Doneenahalli	Bangalore South	Tavarekere-3
638	Ganapatihalli	Bangalore South	Tavarekere-3
639	Karigiripura	Bangalore South	Tavarekere-3
640	Ketohalli	Bangalore South	Tavarekere-3
641	Ketohalli Narasipura	Bangalore South	Tavarekere-3
642	Ketohalli Rampura	Bangalore South	Tavarekere-3
643	K Gururayanapura	Bangalore South	Tavarekere-3
644	Koluru	Bangalore South	Tavarekere-3
645	Koluru Nanjundapura	Bangalore South	Tavarekere-3
646	Muddayyanapalya	Bangalore South	Tavarekere-3
647	Punagamaranahalli	Bangalore South	Tavarekere-3
648	Puradapalya	Bangalore South	Tavarekere-3
649	Sheshagiripura	Bangalore South	Tavarekere-3
650	Sulivara	Bangalore South	Tavarekere-3
651	Sulivara Rampura	Bangalore South	Tavarekere-3
652	Alahalli	Bangalore South	Uttarahalli-1
653	Anjanapura	Bangalore South	Uttarahalli-1
654	Chunchaghatta	Bangalore South	Uttarahalli-1
655	Doddakallasandra	Bangalore South	Uttarahalli-1
656	Gollahalli	Bangalore South	Uttarahalli-1
657	Gottigere	Bangalore South	Uttarahalli-1
658	Govinagovinayakanahalli	Bangalore South	Uttarahalli-1
659	Jaraganahalli	Bangalore South	Uttarahalli-1
660	Kareesandra	Bangalore South	Uttarahalli-1
661	Kembattahalli	Bangalore South	Uttarahalli-1
662	Konanakunte	Bangalore South	Uttarahalli-1
663	Kothanur	Bangalore South	Uttarahalli-1
664	Marenahalli	Bangalore South	Uttarahalli-1
665	Pillaganahalli	Bangalore South	Uttarahalli-1
666	Puttenahalli	Bangalore South	Uttarahalli-1
667	Raghavanapalya	Bangalore South	Uttarahalli-1
668	Sarakki	Bangalore South	Uttarahalli-1
669	Sarakki Kere	Bangalore South	Uttarahalli-1
670	Yalachenahalli	Bangalore South	Uttarahalli-1
671	Gulikamale	Bangalore South	Uttarahalli-2
672	Hosahalli	Bangalore South	Uttarahalli-2
673	Kaggalipura	Bangalore South	Uttarahalli-2
674	Mallasandra	Bangalore South	Uttarahalli-2
675	O B Chudahalli	Bangalore South	Uttarahalli-2
676	Raghuvanahalli	Bangalore South	Uttarahalli-2
677	Talaghattapura	Bangalore South	Uttarahalli-2
678	Taralu	Bangalore South	Uttarahalli-2
679	Tippasandra	Bangalore South	Uttarahalli-2
680	Uttarahalli Manavarthekaval	Bangalore South	Uttarahalli-2
681	Uttari	Bangalore South	Uttarahalli-2
682	Vajarahalli	Bangalore South	Uttarahalli-2
683	Alakabalalu	Bangalore South	Uttarahalli-3
684	K Chudahalli	Bangalore South	Uttarahalli-3
685	Naganaykanahalli	Bangalore South	Uttarahalli-3
686	Nelaguli	Bangalore South	Uttarahalli-3
687	Nettigere	Bangalore South	Uttarahalli-3
688	Ravugudlu	Bangalore South	Uttarahalli-3
689	Somanahalli	Bangalore South	Uttarahalli-3
690	Sunkadakatte	Bangalore South	Uttarahalli-3
691	Tattaguppe	Bangalore South	Uttarahalli-3
692	Vaddarapalya	Bangalore South	Uttarahalli-3
693	Arehalli	Bangalore South	Uttarahalli-4
694	Avalahalli	Bangalore South	Uttarahalli-4
695	Bairasandra	Bangalore South	Uttarahalli-4
696	Bikashipura	Bangalore South	Uttarahalli-4
697	Channasandra	Bangalore South	Uttarahalli-4
698	Chikkakallasandra	Bangalore South	Uttarahalli-4
699	Gubbilala	Bangalore South	Uttarahalli-4
701	Hosakerehalli	Bangalore South	Uttarahalli-4
702	Ittamadu	Bangalore South	Uttarahalli-4
703	Kadirenahalli	Bangalore South	Uttarahalli-4
704	Kathriguppe	Bangalore South	Uttarahalli-4
705	Subramanyapura	Bangalore South	Uttarahalli-4
706	Turahalli	Bangalore South	Uttarahalli-4
707	Uttarahalli	Bangalore South	Uttarahalli-4
708	Vaddarapalya	Bangalore South	Uttarahalli-4
709	Vasanthapura	Bangalore South	Uttarahalli-4
710	Adigondanahalli	Anekal	Attibele-1
711	Arehalli	Anekal	Attibele-1
712	Arenuru	Anekal	Attibele-1
713	Baktipura	Anekal	Attibele-1
714	Balluru	Anekal	Attibele-1
715	Chikkanahalli	Anekal	Attibele-1
716	M Medahalli	Anekal	Attibele-1
717	Guddahatti	Anekal	Attibele-1
718	Halehalli	Anekal	Attibele-1
719	Indlabele	Anekal	Attibele-1
720	Jigala	Anekal	Attibele-1
721	Kambalipura	Anekal	Attibele-1
722	Kodlipura	Anekal	Attibele-1
723	Manchanahalli	Anekal	Attibele-1
724	Maranayakanahalli	Anekal	Attibele-1
725	Mayasandra	Anekal	Attibele-1
726	Muthusandra	Anekal	Attibele-1
727	Anandapura	Anekal	Attibele-2
728	Balegaranahalli	Anekal	Attibele-2
729	Banahalli	Anekal	Attibele-2
730	Bendiganahalli	Anekal	Attibele-2
731	Bommasandra	Anekal	Attibele-2
732	Chandapura	Anekal	Attibele-2
733	Giddenahalli	Anekal	Attibele-2
734	Gollahalli	Anekal	Attibele-2
735	Hebbagodi	Anekal	Attibele-2
736	Heelalige	Anekal	Attibele-2
737	Ichchanguru	Anekal	Attibele-2
738	Iggaluru	Anekal	Attibele-2
739	Kammasandra	Anekal	Attibele-2
740	Kittaganahalli	Anekal	Attibele-2
741	Krishnasagara	Anekal	Attibele-2
742	Neraluru	Anekal	Attibele-2
743	Tirumagondahalli	Anekal	Attibele-2
744	Veerasandra	Anekal	Attibele-2
745	Yadavanahalli	Anekal	Attibele-2
746	Amanibhujangadasanake	Anekal	Jigani
747	Amanibidarakere	Anekal	Jigani
748	Bairappanahalli	Anekal	Jigani
749	Bandenallasandra	Anekal	Jigani
750	Bannerghatta	Anekal	Jigani
751	Begihalli	Anekal	Jigani
752	Bhutanahalli	Anekal	Jigani
753	Bilvaradahalli	Anekal	Jigani
754	Bommandahalli	Anekal	Jigani
755	Bukkasagara	Anekal	Jigani
756	Dyavasandra	Anekal	Jigani
757	Giddenahalli	Anekal	Jigani
758	Haragadde	Anekal	Jigani
759	Harappanahalli	Anekal	Jigani
760	Hennagara	Anekal	Jigani
761	Hinnakki	Anekal	Jigani
762	Hosahalli	Anekal	Jigani
763	Hulimangala	Anekal	Jigani
764	Hullahalli	Anekal	Jigani
765	Hullukasavanahalli	Anekal	Jigani
766	J Bingeepura	Anekal	Jigani
767	Kachanayakanahalli	Anekal	Jigani
768	Kadujakkanahalli	Anekal	Jigani
769	Kalkere	Anekal	Jigani
770	Kallubalu	Anekal	Jigani
771	Kannanayakanagrahara	Anekal	Jigani
772	Konasandra	Anekal	Jigani
773	Koppa	Anekal	Jigani
774	Kyalasanahalli	Anekal	Jigani
775	Lakshmeepura	Anekal	Jigani
776	Mahantalingapura	Anekal	Jigani
777	Mantapa	Anekal	Jigani
778	Maragondanahalli	Anekal	Jigani
779	Nallasandra	Anekal	Jigani
780	Nanjapura	Anekal	Jigani
781	Nosenuru	Anekal	Jigani
782	Ragihalli	Anekal	Jigani
783	Rajapura	Anekal	Jigani
784	Ramakrishnapura	Anekal	Jigani
785	Ramasandra	Anekal	Jigani
786	Sakalavara	Anekal	Jigani
787	Sheetanayakanahalli	Anekal	Jigani
788	Shivanahalli	Anekal	Jigani
789	So Gollahalli	Anekal	Jigani
790	Tirupalya	Anekal	Jigani
791	Vabasandra	Anekal	Jigani
792	Vaderahalli	Anekal	Jigani
793	Vaderamanchanahalli	Anekal	Jigani
794	Ya Amanikere	Anekal	Jigani
795	Yarandahalli	Anekal	Jigani
796	A Medihalli	Anekal	Kasaba
797	Aduru	Anekal	Kasaba
798	Agasatimmanahalli	Anekal	Kasaba
799	Amanidoddakere	Anekal	Kasaba
800	Aravantigepura	Anekal	Kasaba
801	Avadadenahalli	Anekal	Kasaba
802	Bagganadoddi	Anekal	Kasaba
803	Bestamanahalli	Anekal	Kasaba
804	Bidaragere	Anekal	Kasaba
805	Bidarakadahalli	Anekal	Kasaba
806	Byagadadenahalli	Anekal	Kasaba
807	Channen Agrahara	Anekal	Kasaba
808	Chikkahagade	Anekal	Kasaba
809	Chikkahosahalli	Anekal	Kasaba
810	Chikkanahalli	Anekal	Kasaba
811	Chikkannanahatti	Anekal	Kasaba
812	Chudenahalli	Anekal	Kasaba
813	Dodda Hagade	Anekal	Kasaba
814	Geratiganabele	Anekal	Kasaba
815	Gowrenahalli	Anekal	Kasaba
816	Guddanahalli	Anekal	Kasaba
817	Haldenahalli	Anekal	Kasaba
818	Hampalaghatta	Anekal	Kasaba
819	Hasiruvani	Anekal	Kasaba
820	Honnakalasapura	Anekal	Kasaba
821	Indlavadi	Anekal	Kasaba
822	Indlavadipura	Anekal	Kasaba
823	Kalanayakanahalli	Anekal	Kasaba
824	Kammasandra Agrahara	Anekal	Kasaba
825	Karpuru	Anekal	Kasaba
826	Kavalahosahalli	Anekal	Kasaba
827	Kempavaderahalli	Anekal	Kasaba
828	Konamadivala	Anekal	Kasaba
829	Kumbaranahalli	Anekal	Kasaba
830	Kurubarahatti	Anekal	Kasaba
831	Lingapura	Anekal	Kasaba
832	Madivala	Anekal	Kasaba
833	Marasuru	Anekal	Kasaba
834	Marasuru Agrahara	Anekal	Kasaba
835	Menasiganahalli	Anekal	Kasaba
836	Muttagatti	Anekal	Kasaba
837	P Gollahalli	Anekal	Kasaba
838	Rachamanahalli	Anekal	Kasaba
839	Sabmangala	Anekal	Kasaba
840	Samanduru	Anekal	Kasaba
841	Sidihosakote	Anekal	Kasaba
842	Singasandra	Anekal	Kasaba
843	Soluru	Anekal	Kasaba
844	Sonninayakanapura	Anekal	Kasaba
845	Soppahalli	Anekal	Kasaba
846	Sunavara	Anekal	Kasaba
847	Surajakkanahalli	Anekal	Kasaba
848	Tammanayakanahalli	Anekal	Kasaba
849	Tatnahalli	Anekal	Kasaba
850	Telugarahalli	Anekal	Kasaba
851	Timmasandra	Anekal	Kasaba
852	Vanakanahalli	Anekal	Kasaba
853	Banahalli	Anekal	Sarjapura-1
854	Chikkadasarahalli	Anekal	Sarjapura-1
855	Chikkanahalli Kamanahalli	Anekal	Sarjapura-1
856	Chikkanekkundi	Anekal	Sarjapura-1
857	Chikkavaderapura	Anekal	Sarjapura-1
858	Deshapandegattahalli	Anekal	Sarjapura-1
859	Doddatimmasandra	Anekal	Sarjapura-1
860	Dommasandra	Anekal	Sarjapura-1
861	Gonighattapura	Anekal	Sarjapura-1
862	Gudigattanahalli	Anekal	Sarjapura-1
863	Halasahalli Tippasandra	Anekal	Sarjapura-1
864	Heggondahalli	Anekal	Sarjapura-1
865	Ittanguru	Anekal	Sarjapura-1
866	Jantagondanahalli	Anekal	Sarjapura-1
867	Katriguppe	Anekal	Sarjapura-1
868	Kuguru	Anekal	Sarjapura-1
869	Kutaganahalli	Anekal	Sarjapura-1
870	Madappanahalli	Anekal	Sarjapura-1
871	Mahal Chowdadenahalli	Anekal	Sarjapura-1
872	Mattanahalli	Anekal	Sarjapura-1
873	Mugaluru	Anekal	Sarjapura-1
874	Nagena Agrahara	Anekal	Sarjapura-1
875	Nekkundidommasandra	Anekal	Sarjapura-1
876	Neriga	Anekal	Sarjapura-1
877	Panditanagrahara	Anekal	Sarjapura-1
878	Ramanaykanahalli	Anekal	Sarjapura-1
879	Sarjapura	Anekal	Sarjapura-1
880	Sheeganaykanahalli	Anekal	Sarjapura-1
881	Tigalachowdadenahalli	Anekal	Sarjapura-1
882	Tindlu	Anekal	Sarjapura-1
883	Valagere Kallahalli	Anekal	Sarjapura-1
884	Adigarakallahalli	Anekal	Sarjapura-2
885	Alibommasandra	Anekal	Sarjapura-2
886	Avalahalli	Anekal	Sarjapura-2
887	B Hosahalli	Anekal	Sarjapura-2
888	Balahalli	Anekal	Sarjapura-2
889	Bikkanahalli	Anekal	Sarjapura-2
890	Bilchikkanahalli	Anekal	Sarjapura-2
891	Billapura	Anekal	Sarjapura-2
892	Buragunte	Anekal	Sarjapura-2
893	Chambenahalli	Anekal	Sarjapura-2
894	Chikkadunnasandra	Anekal	Sarjapura-2
895	Chikkanagamangala	Anekal	Sarjapura-2
896	Chikkatimmasandra	Anekal	Sarjapura-2
897	Chintalamadivala	Anekal	Sarjapura-2
898	Chokkasandra	Anekal	Sarjapura-2
899	Chudasandra	Anekal	Sarjapura-2
900	Gattahalli	Anekal	Sarjapura-2
901	Gattamaranahalli	Anekal	Sarjapura-2
902	Gopasandra	Anekal	Sarjapura-2
903	Gulimangala	Anekal	Sarjapura-2
904	Handenahalli	Anekal	Sarjapura-2
905	Harohalli	Anekal	Sarjapura-2
906	Huskuru	Anekal	Sarjapura-2
907	Kadagrahara	Anekal	Sarjapura-2
908	Kaggaleepura	Anekal	Sarjapura-2
909	Kommasandra	Anekal	Sarjapura-2
910	Kudlu	Anekal	Sarjapura-2
911	Kutaganahalli	Anekal	Sarjapura-2
912	Muttanalluru	Anekal	Sarjapura-2
913	Muttanalluru Amanike	Anekal	Sarjapura-2
914	Narayanaghatta	Anekal	Sarjapura-2
915	Rayasandra	Anekal	Sarjapura-2
916	Samanahalli	Anekal	Sarjapura-2
917	Shreeramapura	Anekal	Sarjapura-2
918	Singenagrahara	Anekal	Sarjapura-2
919	Sollepura	Anekal	Sarjapura-2
920	Sompura	Anekal	Sarjapura-2
921	Yamare	Anekal	Sarjapura-2

== Administration ==
The district administration is headed by a Deputy Commissioner, who is an IAS officer. The deputy commissioner (DC) also functions as the collector and district magistrate of the district. There are various officials both at the district level and at the taluk levels to assist the Deputy Commissioner. They include the Assistant Commissioner’s (Sub-Divisional Magistrate), Tahsildars, Shirstedars, Revenue Inspectors and Village Accountants.

The Bengaluru Urban district is divided into two subdivisions—North and South—each headed by an Assistant Commissioner (AC). The Assistant Commissioners also serve as the Sub-Divisional Magistrates for their respective subdivisions. The North subdivision comprises three taluks, and the South subdivision comprises two taluks, making a total of five taluks. Each taluk is headed by a Tahsildar. Every taluk consists of hoblis and revenue villages, which are administered by Revenue Inspectors and Village Accountants respectively.

== Zilla Panchayat, Bengaluru Urban ==
The Zilla Panchayat is the local governing body responsible for administering the rural areas of the Bengaluru Urban district, excluding the urban local bodies. It is headed by an Adhyaksha (president) and Upadhyaksha, who are elected representatives. Administratively, the Zilla Panchayat is headed by a Chief Executive Officer (CEO), an IAS officer. It serves as the apex body in the three-tier Panchayati Raj governance structure in the district.

== Geography ==
=== Climate ===
The climate here is moderate. The lowest average temperature is about 16–18 °C (61–64 °F).

Climate data for Bangalore
Month	Jan	Feb	Mar	Apr	May	Jun	Jul	Aug	Sep	Oct	Nov	Dec	Year
Mean daily maximum °C (°F)	27 (81)	29.6 (85.3)	32.4 (90.3)	33.6 (92.5)	32.7 (90.9)	29.2 (84.6)	27.5 (81.5)	27.4 (81.3)	28 (82)	27.7 (81.9)	26.6 (79.9)	25.9 (78.6)	29 (84)
Mean daily minimum °C (°F)	15.1 (59.2)	16.6 (61.9)	19.2 (66.6)	21.5 (70.7)	21.2 (70.2)	19.9 (67.8)	19.5 (67.1)	19.4 (66.9)	19.3 (66.7)	19.1 (66.4)	17.2 (63.0)	15.6 (60.1)	18.6 (65.5)
Average rainfall mm (inches)	2.7 (0.11)	7.2 (0.28)	4.4 (0.17)	46.3 (1.82)	119.6 (4.71)	80.6 (3.17)	110.2 (4.34)	137 (5.4)	194.8 (7.67)	180.4 (7.10)	64.5 (2.54)	22.1 (0.87)	969.8 (38.18)
Average rainy days	0.2	0.5	0.4	3	7	6.4	8.3	10	9.3	9	4	1.7	59.8
Mean monthly sunshine hours	263.5	248.6	272.8	258	241.8	138	111.6	114.7	144	173.6	189	210.8	2,366.4
Source 1: WMO
Source 2: HKO (sun only, 1971–1990)

=== Water ===
According to the National Wetland Atlas (2010) the district has two main rivers and 580 wetlands.

== Demographics ==
Historical population
Year	Pop.	±% p.a.
1901	394,794	—
1911	428,228	+0.82%
1921	480,675	+1.16%
1931	590,218	+2.07%
1941	738,393	+2.27%
1951	1,253,542	+5.44%
1961	1,499,333	+1.81%
1971	2,197,347	+3.90%
1981	3,495,566	+4.75%
1991	4,839,162	+3.31%
2001	6,537,124	+3.05%
2011	9,621,551	+3.94%

Religions in Bangalore Urban district (2011)
Religion	Percent
Hinduism	80.29%
Islam	12.97%
Christianity	5.25%
Jainism	0.86%
Other or not stated	0.63%

According to the 2011 census Bangalore Urban district has a population of 9,621,551, roughly equal to the nation of Belarus. This gives it a ranking of third in India (out of a total of 640). The district has a population density of 4,378 inhabitants per square kilometre (11,340/sq mi). Its population growth rate over the decade 2001-2011 was 46.68%. Bangalore has a sex ratio of 908 females for every 1000 males, and a literacy rate of 88.48%. 90.94% of the population lives in urban areas. Scheduled Castes and Scheduled Tribes make up 12.46% and 1.98% of the population respectively.

Languages of Bangalore Urban district (2011)
1. Kannada (44.5%)
2. Tamil (16.0%)
3. Telugu (14.0%)
4. Urdu (12.1%)
5. Hindi (4.55%)
6. Malayalam (2.94%)
7. Marathi (1.92%)
8. Others (4.82%)

At the time of the 2011 census, 44.47% of the population spoke Kannada, 15.20% Tamil, 13.99% Telugu, 12.11% Urdu, 4.55% Hindi, 2.94% Malayalam and 1.92% Marathi as their first language.

== Temples ==
- Gavi Gangadhareshwara Temple
- Dodda Basavana Gudi
- Halasuru Someshwara Temple, Bangalore
- Nageshvara Temple, Begur
- ISKCON Temple Bangalore
- Kote Venkataramana Temple, Bangalore
- Banashankari Amma Temple

== See also ==
- Ajjanahalli, Bangalore South
- Bangalore Division
