= Badamanavarthekaval =

Badamanavarthe Kaval
- village
- Location in Karnataka, India
- Coordinates: 12.861366595707544°N 77.48494989888331°E
- Country: India
- State: Karnataka
- District: Bangalore Urban
- Talukas: Bangalore South

Government
  - Body: Village Panchayat

Area
  - Total: 2.97 km^{2} (1.15 sq mi)

Population (2011)
  - Total: 3,912
  - Density: 1,320/km^{2} (3,410/sq mi)

Languages
  - Official: Kannada
- Time zone: UTC+5:30 (IST)
- PIN: 560 062
- Nearest city: Bangalore
- Civic agency: Village Panchayat

Badamanavarthekaval or BM Kaval is a village in the southern state of Karnataka, India. It is located in the outskirts of Bangalore situated in Bangalore South Taluk of Bangalore Urban district. This location is recently in discussion for its administrative context because it lies on Bengaluru’s expanding periphery, Badamanavarthekaval has been included in various Greater Bengaluru planning efforts and is affected by urban expansion and government land-use decisions.

The area has seen disputes and irregularities connected to conversion of agricultural/forest land into layouts and private holdings; several illegal layouts on agricultural, government and forest lands have been identified and removed.

There have been high-profile contested land transfers in the wider BM Kaval region (including proposals, awards and state government legal interventions), and plans such as a proposed Film City / estate transfers have attracted court challenges.

.

== Land related legal issues ==
Since this village is located in the outskirts of Bangalore, there are many legal issues related to land allotment. Many layouts formed on Agricultural land was removed. There was an attempt to regularise Layouts formed on Government lands, Lakes and Forest Area. Adding to the irregularities, the Deputy Commissioner of Bangalore Urban district had awarded 285 acre of land to Khoday Group and Government of Karnataka approached High Court to stall the order. Once home to peacocks, deer, rabbits, jackals and a variety of winged creatures. However, the verdant forest, in Bangalore South region, has been turned into a concrete jungle, thanks to Bagair Hukum land scheme, putting its rich flora and fauna in peril. Due to increasing incidents of Forest fire, Poaching of animals, Forest department uses drones for constant monitoring and also avoided entry to Birders as a precautionary measure. A Film City was also planned at Roerich Estate and High Court stalled the land Transfer process.

== Demographics ==
Population details
Village Name	Area in Hectares (1981)	(2001)	Households (1981)	Population (1971)	1981	1991	2001	2011
Badamanavarthekaval	2968.03	104.09	217	878	1178	1424	2060	3912

=== 2011 ===
2011 Census data
Population	Persons	Males	Females
Total	3,912	2,009	1,903
In the age group 0–6 years	505	255	250
Scheduled Castes (SC)	1,509	771	738
Scheduled Tribes (ST)	126	66	60
Literates	2,380	1,375	1,005
Illiterate	1,532	634	898
Total Worker	1,747	1,134	613
Main Worker	1,424	939	485
Main Worker - Cultivator	221	129	92
Main Worker - Agricultural Labourers	202	120	82
Main Worker - Household Industries	8	4	4
Main Worker - Other	993	686	307
Marginal Worker	323	195	128
Marginal Worker - Cultivator	6	1	5
Marginal Worker - Agriculture Labourers	3	2	1
Marginal Worker - Household Industries	0	0	0
Marginal Workers - Other	314	192	122
Marginal Worker (3-6 Months)	312	189	123
Marginal Worker - Cultivator (3-6 Months)	6	1	5
Marginal Worker - Agriculture Labourers (3-6 Months)	3	2	1
Marginal Worker - Household Industries (3-6 Months)	0	0	0
Marginal Worker - Other (3-6 Months)	303	186	117
Marginal Worker (0-3 Months)	11	6	5
Marginal Worker - Cultivator (0-3 Months)	0	0	0
Marginal Worker - Agriculture Labourers (0-3 Months)	0	0	0
Marginal Worker - Household Industries (0-3 Months)	0	0	0
Marginal Worker - Other Workers (0-3 Months)	11	6	5
Non Worker	2,165	875	1,290
