= Binnamangala Manavarthe Kaval =

- neighbourhood
- Location within Bengaluru
- Coordinates: 12.980748913495036°N 77.646320199081°E
- Country: India
- State: Karnataka
- Metro: Bengaluru

Languages
  - Official: Kannada, English
- Time zone: UTC+5:30 (IST)
- PIN: 560075

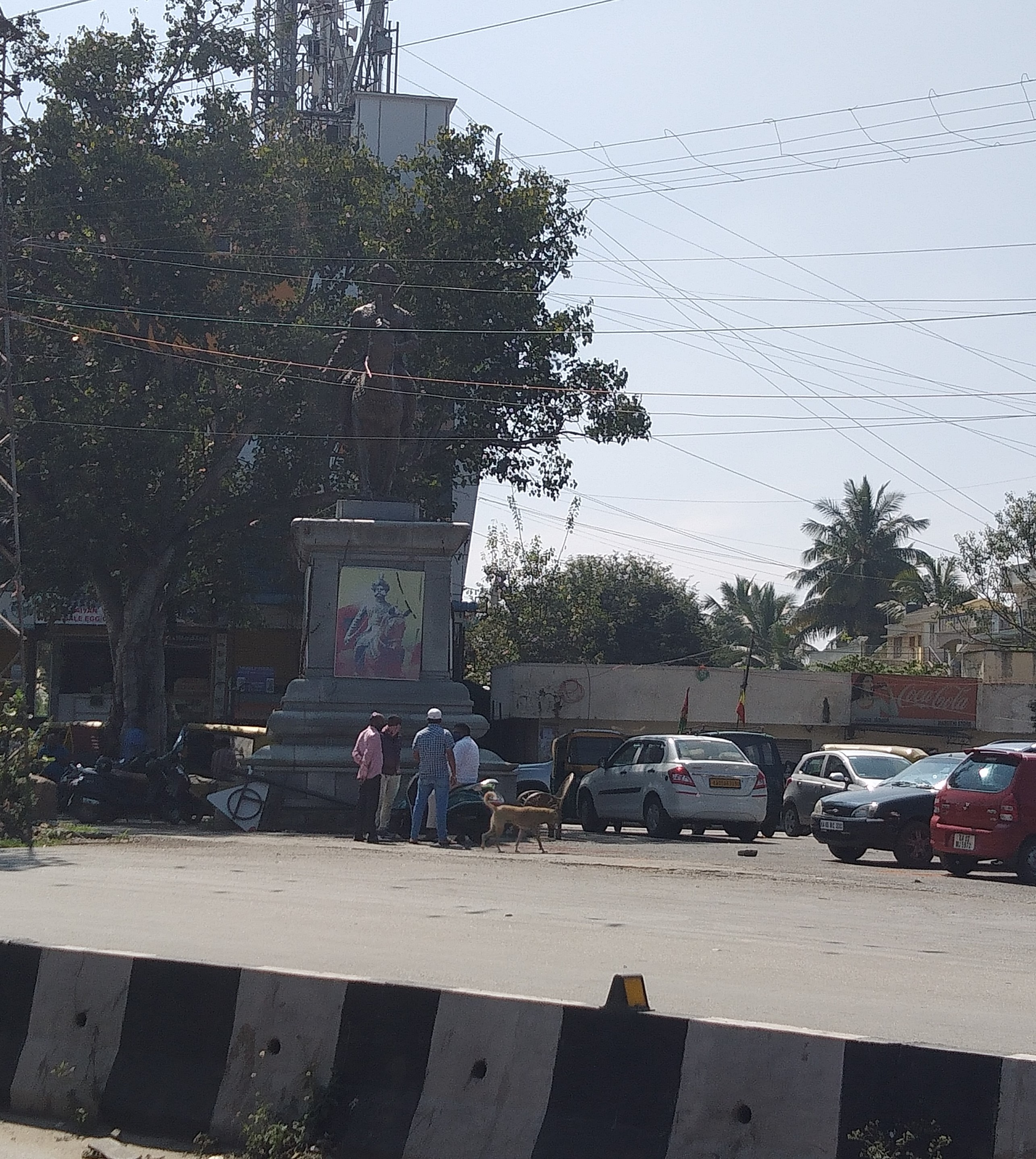
Kempe Gowda Circle, Suranjan Das Road and New Thippasandra/GM Palya Main Road JN

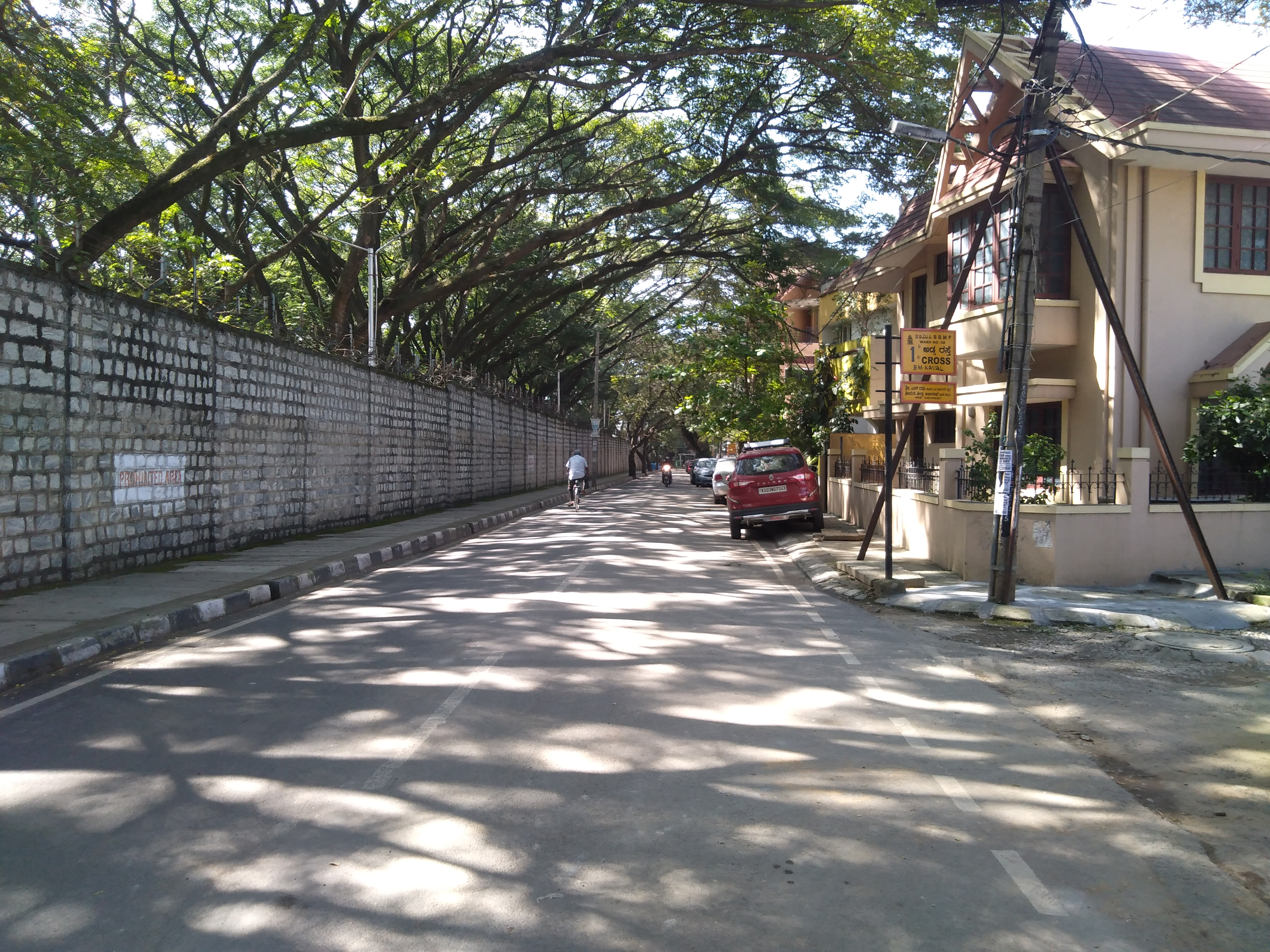
1st Main, BM Kaval

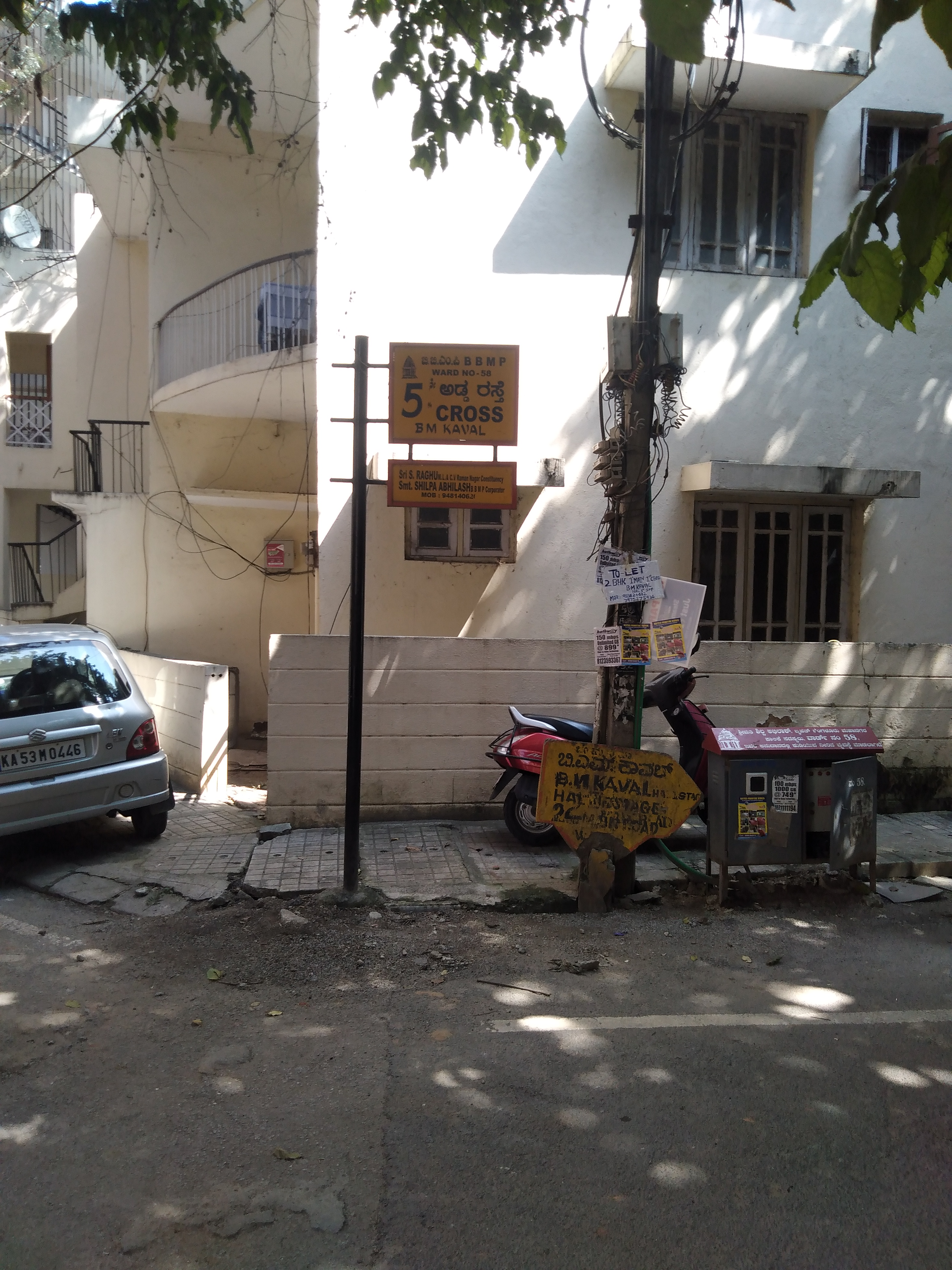
5th Cross, BM Kaval Main Road

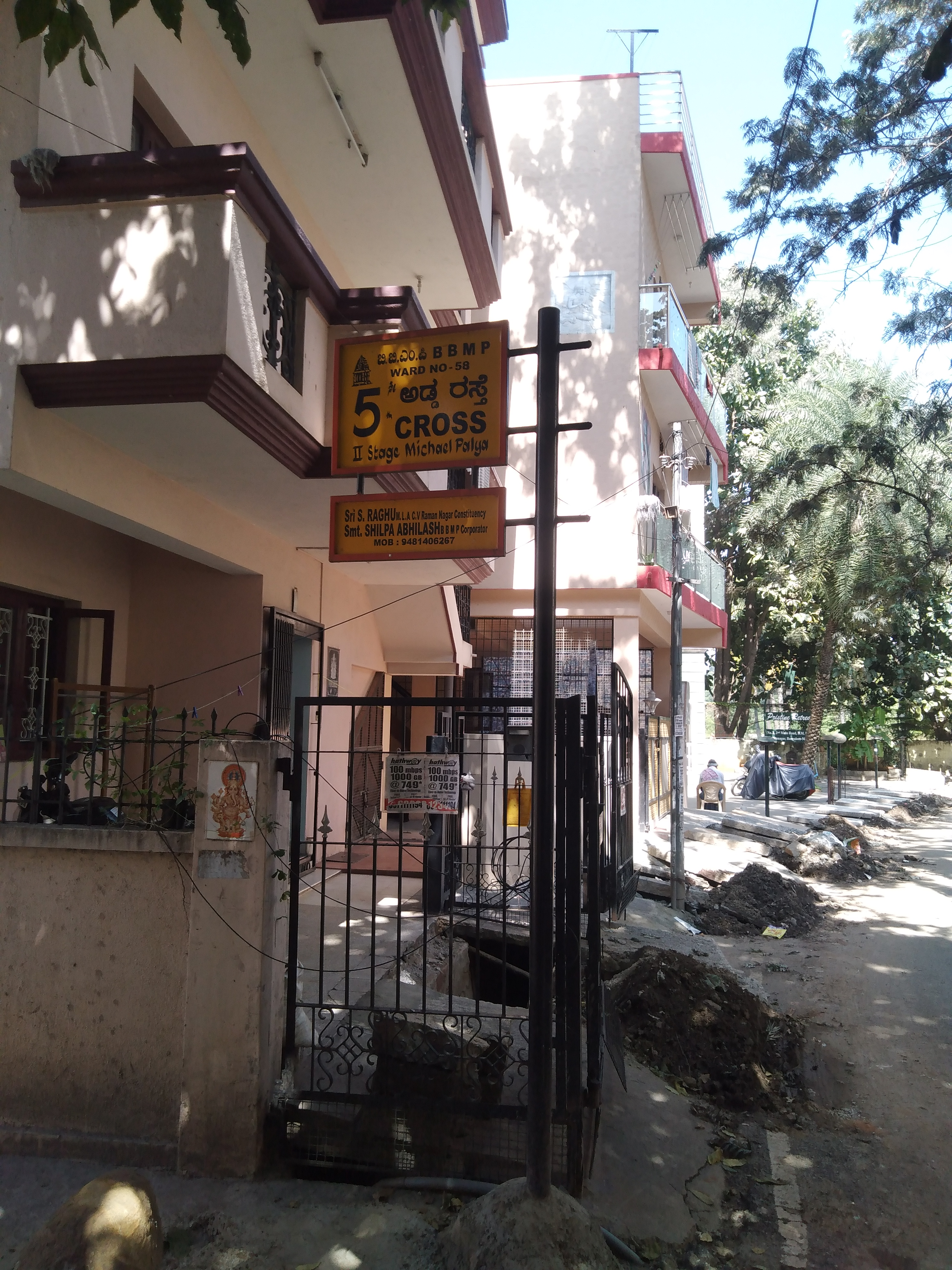
5th Cross, Michaelpalya, BM Kaval

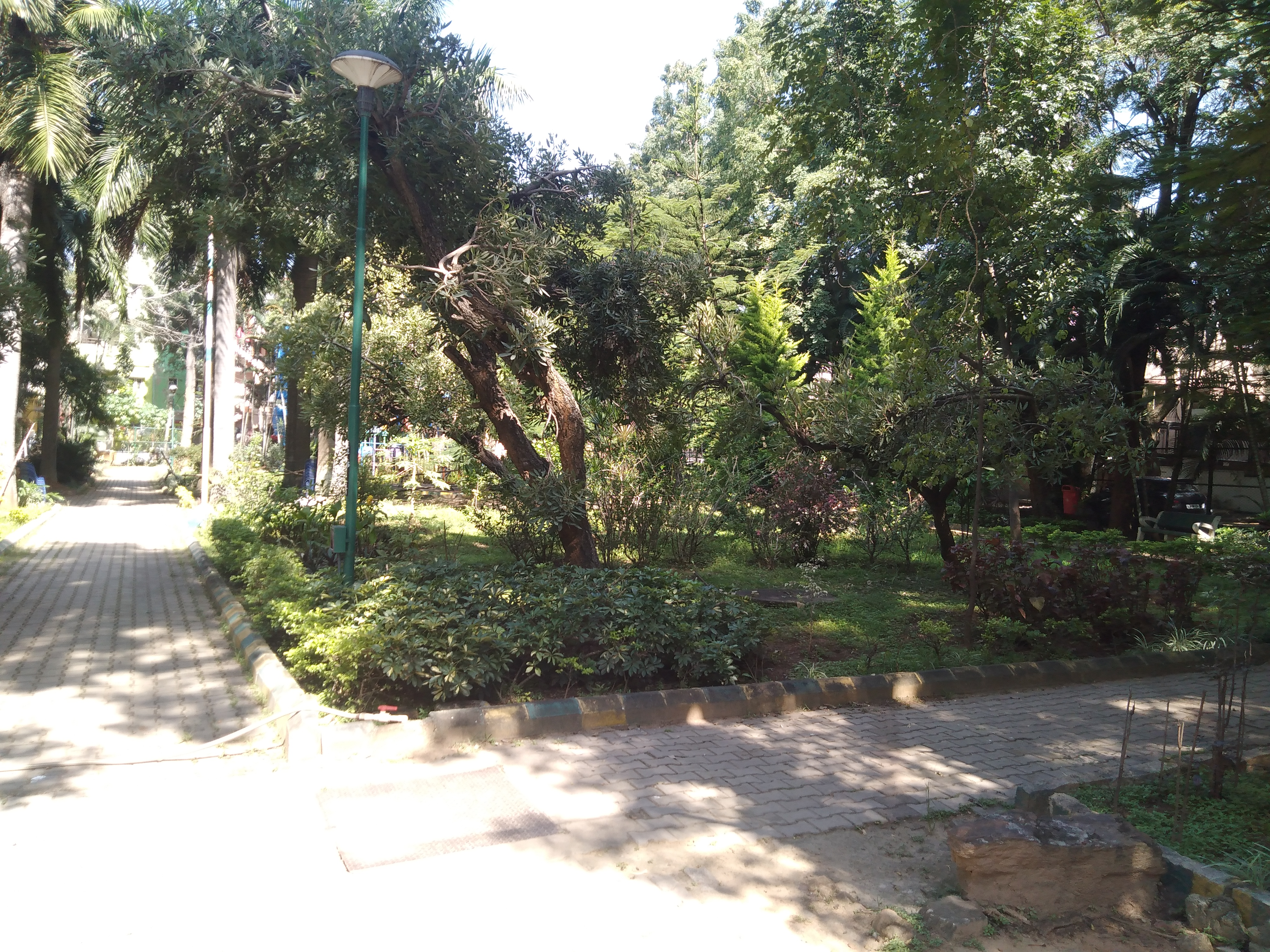
BM Kaval Park, Indiranagar 1st stage

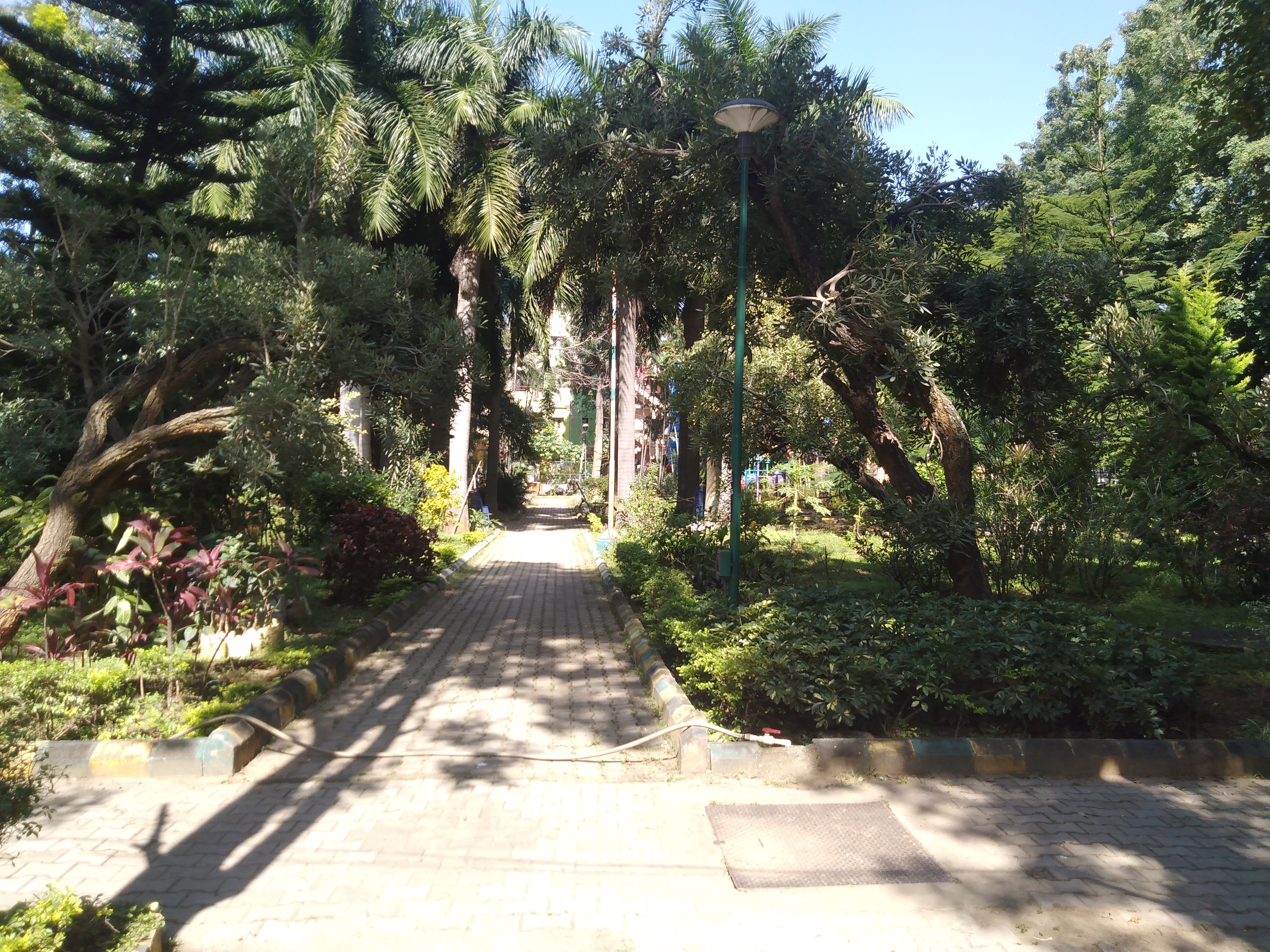
BM Kaval Park, Indiranagar 1st stage

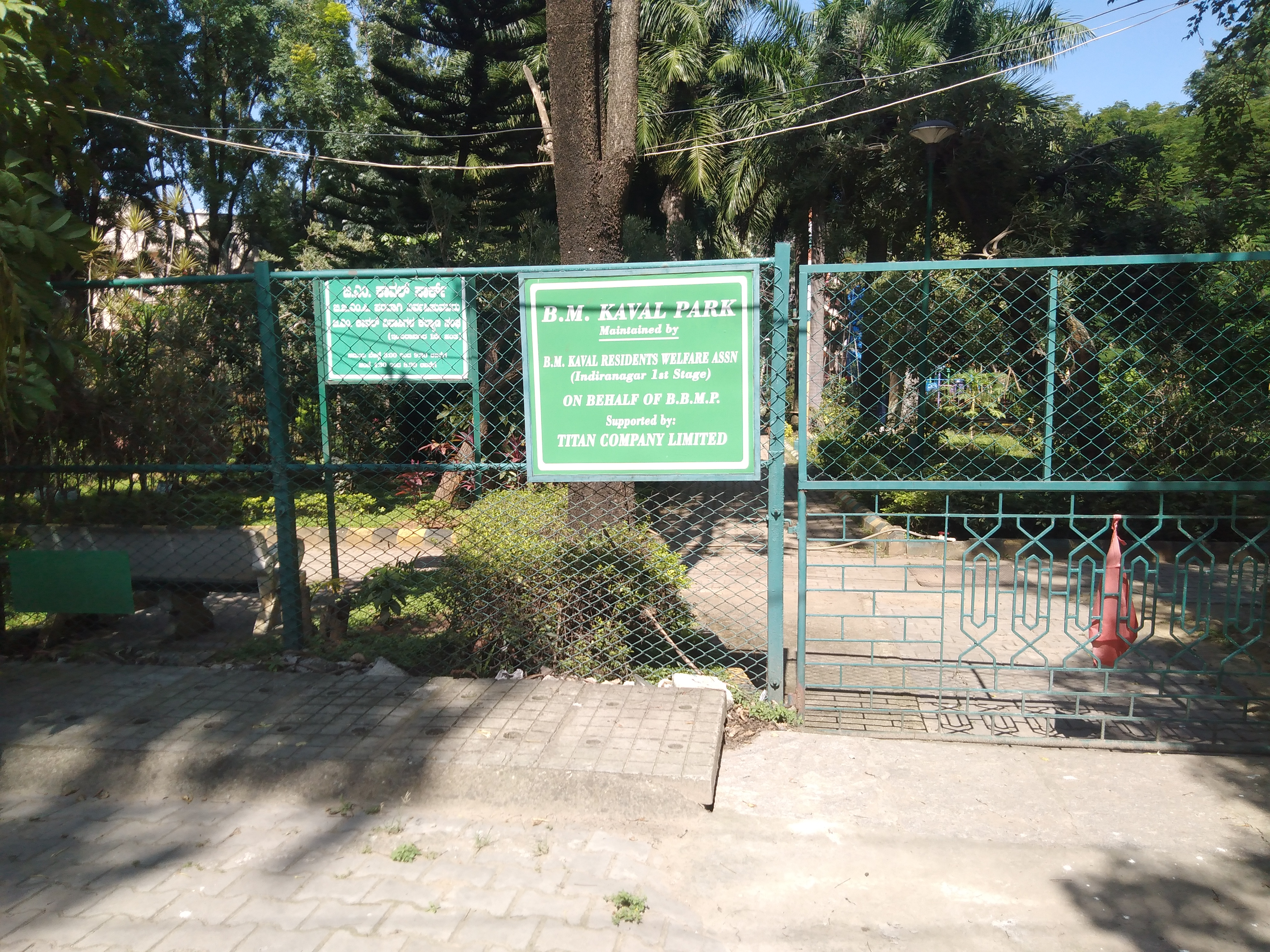
BM Kaval Park, Indiranagar 1st stage

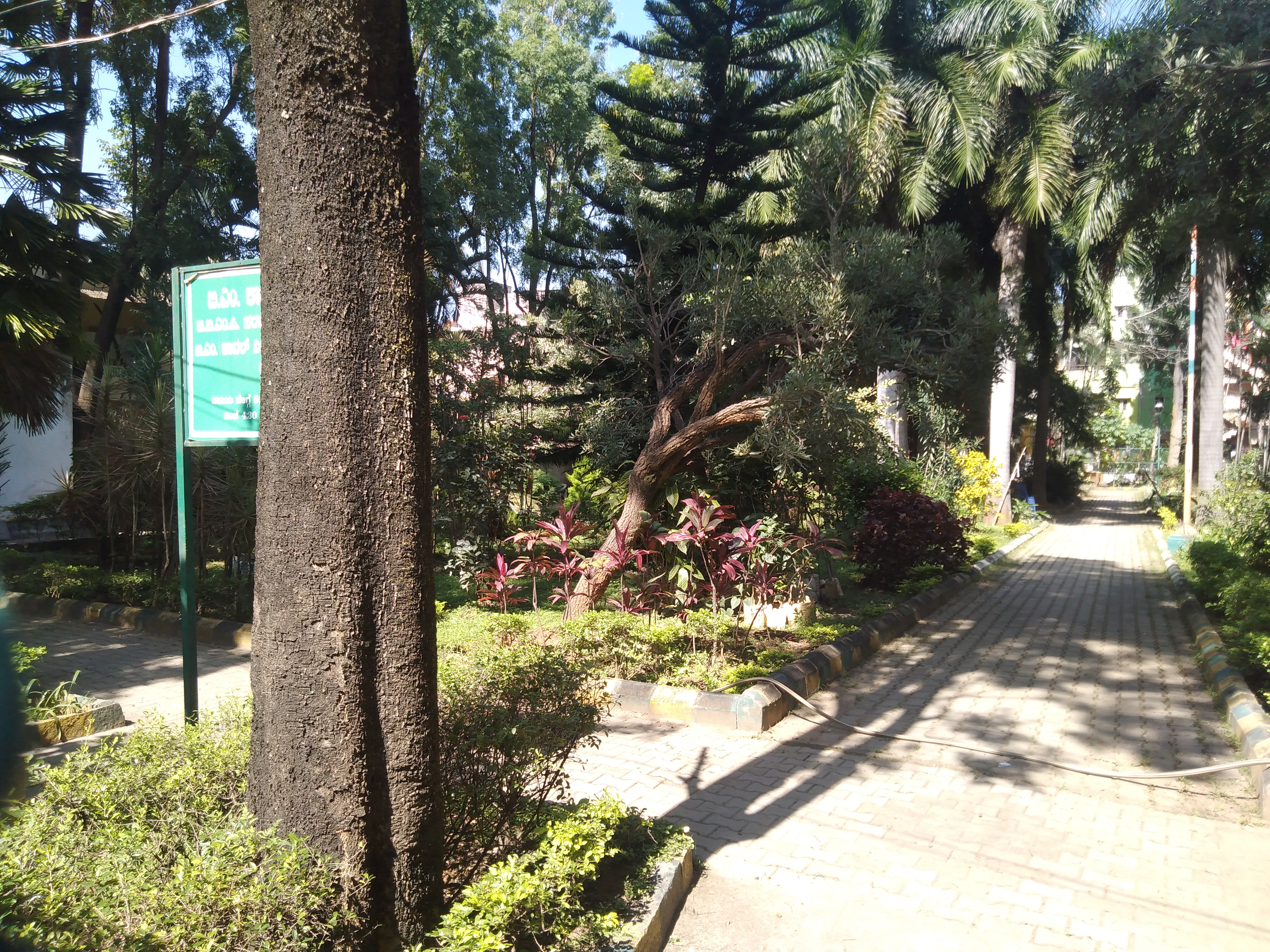
BM Kaval Park, Indiranagar 1st stage

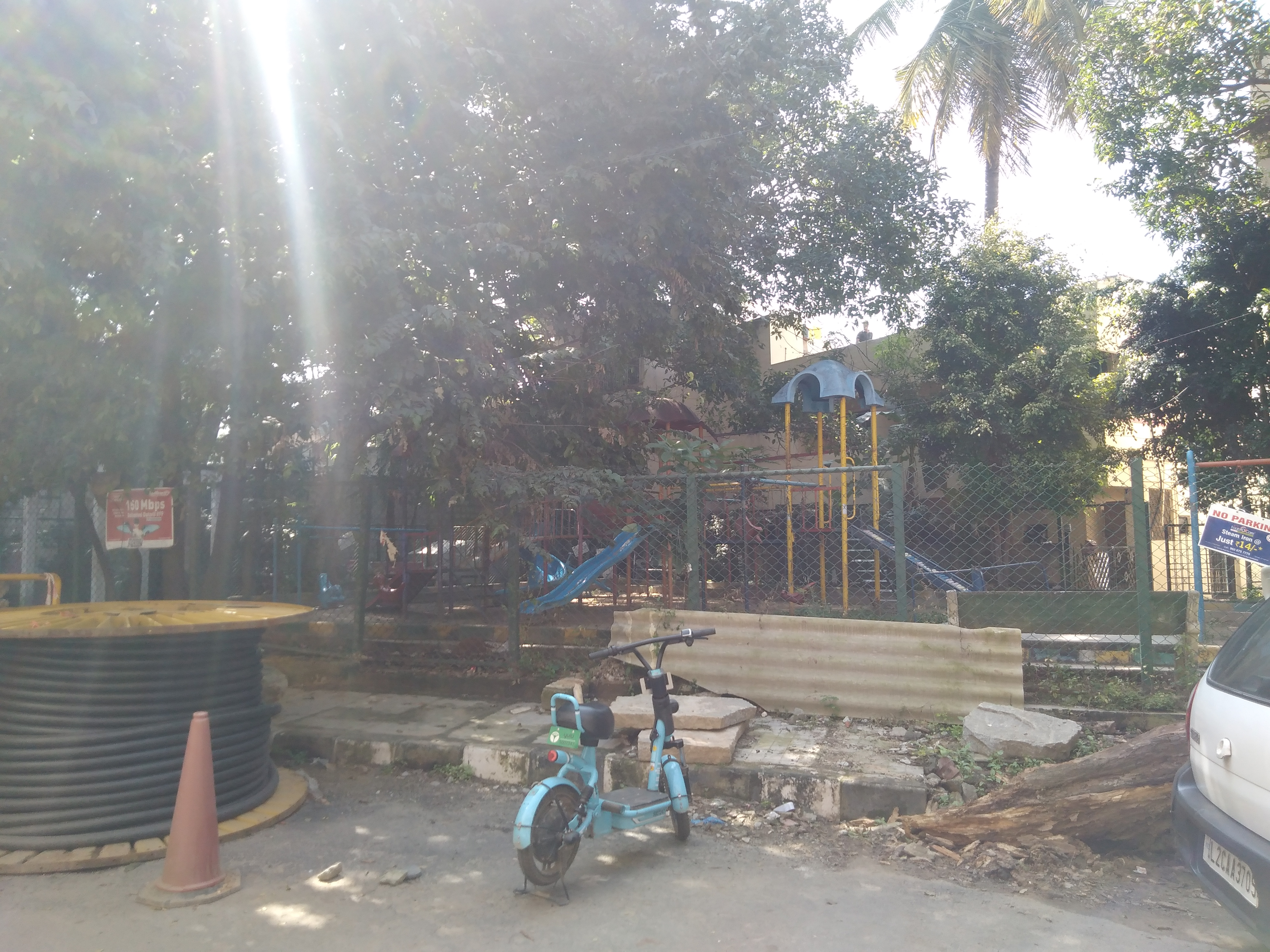
BM Kaval Kids Park, HAL 1st Stage

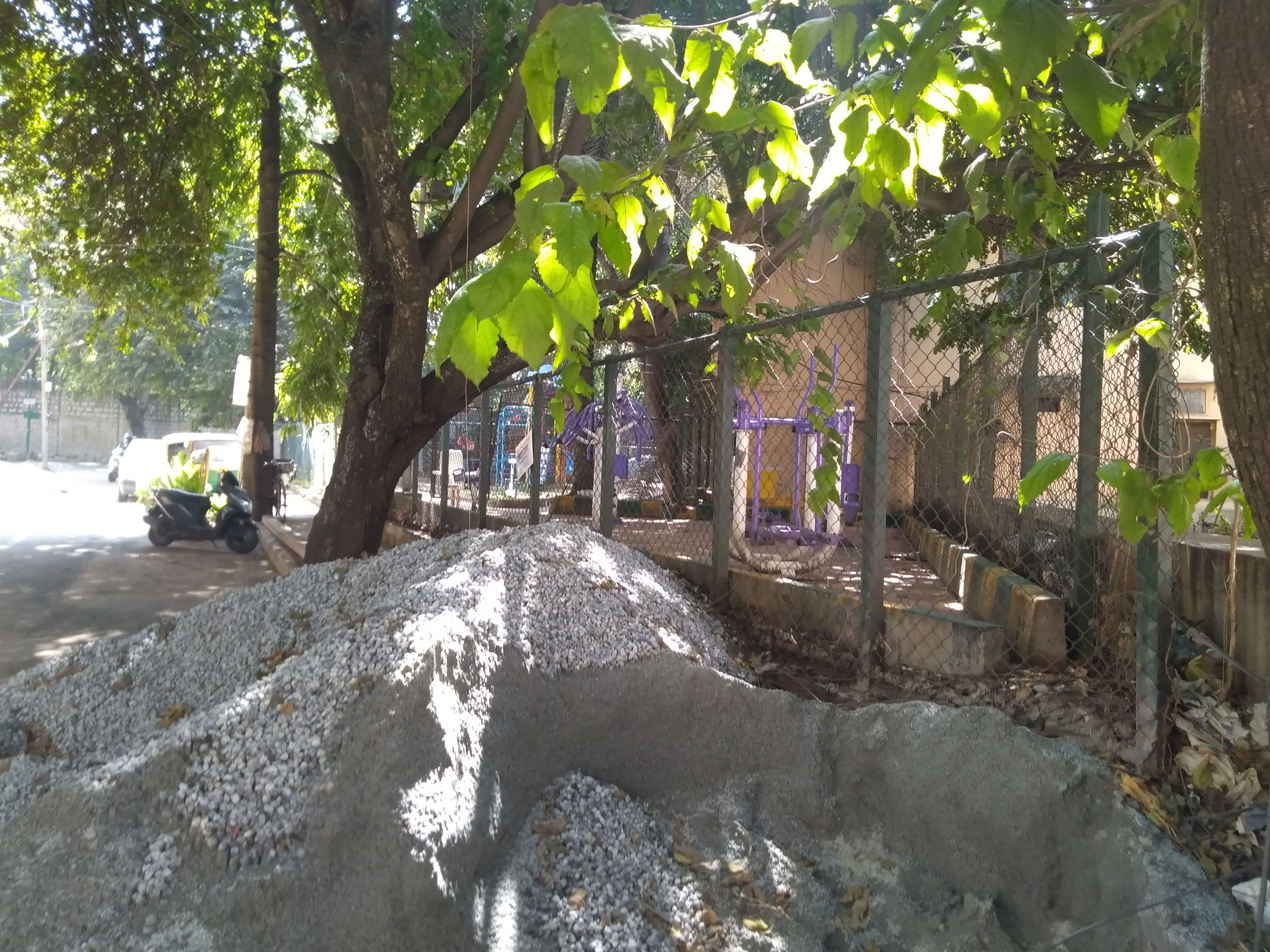
BM Kaval Kids Park, HAL 1st Stage

Binnamangala Manavarthe Kaval or B. M. Kaval is one of the early settlements in Bengaluru. It is part of C. V. Raman Nagar Assembly constituency in East Bengaluru. This former village was considered as Outgrowth of Bangalore city in 1981 and had a population of 10516 in 1991 Census, finally merged with Bangalore Mahanagara Palike on 7 December 1995. The process was completed by April 2007 and the body was renamed Bruhat Bengaluru Mahanagara Palike (Greater Bangalore Municipal Corporation).

Population details
Village Name	Area in Hectares (1981)	Urban component	Population (1961)	1971	1981	1991	2001	2011
Binnamangala Manavarthe Kaval	80.85	50.56	-	797	2563 (Outgrowth)	Outgrowth	BMP	BBMP
