= Prestige Kingfisher Towers =

Luxury residential skyscraper in Bengaluru, India

Kingfisher Towers
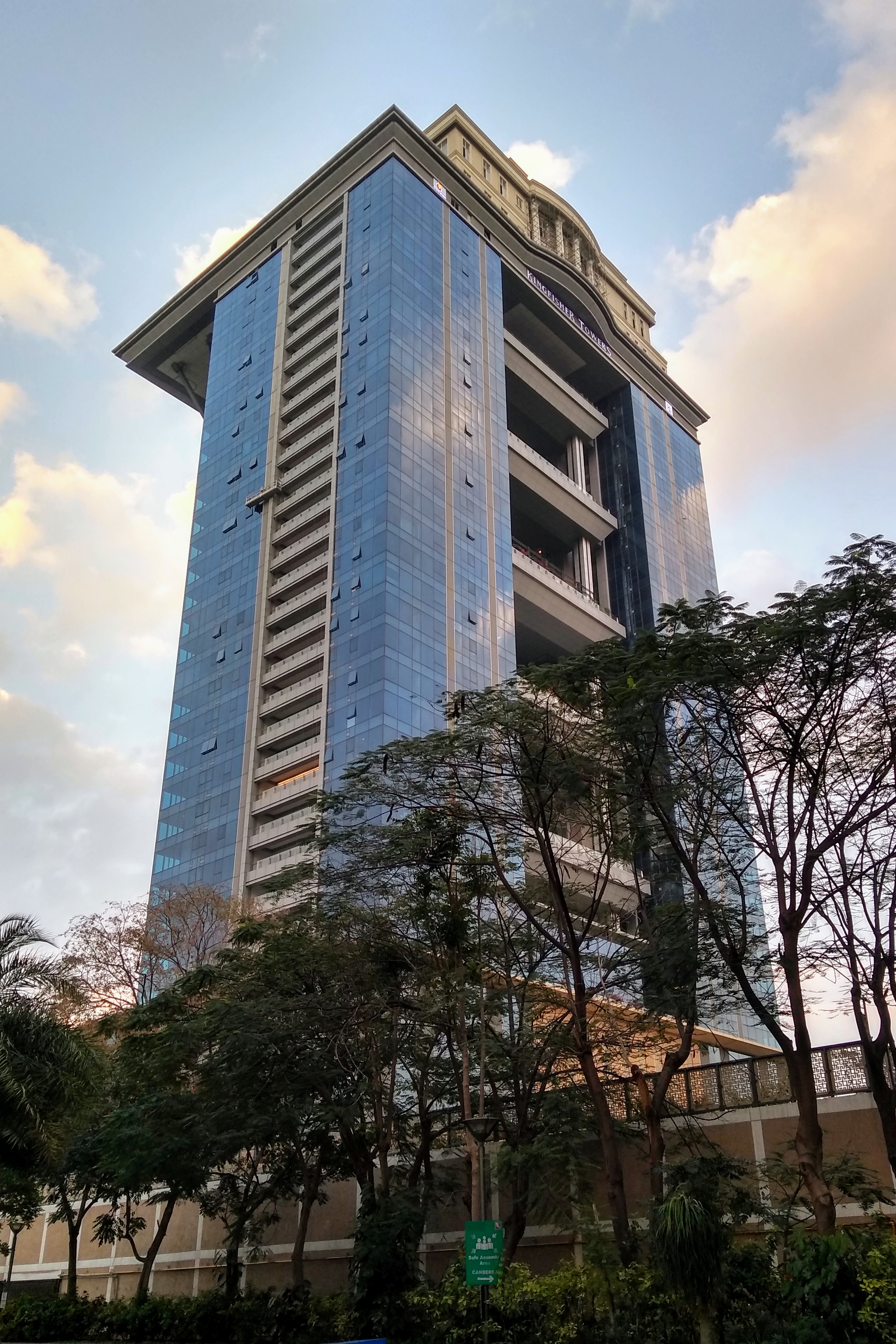
- Interactive map of the Kingfisher Towers area

General information
- Status: Completed
- Type: Residential skyscraper
- Architectural style: Modern
- Location: Kasturba Road, Bangalore, Karnataka, India
- Coordinates: 12.9722°N 77.5956°E
- Construction started: 2012
- Completed: 2018

Height
- Roof: 122 m

Technical details
- Floor count: 34
- Floor area: ~65,000 m²

Design and construction
- Architect: Thomas Associates
- Developer: Prestige Group, Irfan Razack, United Breweries Group
- Main contractor: Prestige Group

Kingfisher Towers is also known as Prestige Kingfisher Towers, is a luxury residential complex located on Kasturba Road in UB City at Vittal Mallya road Bangalore. Developed by the Prestige Group in collaboration with the United Breweries Group, The building list as the tallest residential buildings in Bangalore. The property has since been seized by Government of India.

== Design and construction ==
The towers were designed by Thomas Associates. A distinctive architectural feature is the rooftop cantilever supporting the "Sky Mansion" originally planned by businessman Vijay Mallya.

== Sky Mansion ==
The Sky Mansion covering the top levels of one tower, was built as a 40,000 square foot penthouse resembling the White House. It includes a helipad, infinity pool, private elevators, and landscaped rooftop gardens. Though completed, the mansion remains unoccupied following Mallya's departure from India amid financial and legal proceedings. The property has since been seized by Government of India.

== See also ==
- UB City
- List of tallest buildings in Bangalore
- Vijay Mallya
- United Breweries Group
- Prestige Group
