= Dravida Vizhipunarchi Kazhagam =

Political party in Tamil Nadu, India

The Dravida Vizhipunarchi Kazhagam (Dravidian Awareness Federation) is a political party in Tamil Nadu, India. The party was founded in 2001 by B.T. Kumar. The party is headquartered in Vadapalani, Chennai. The party had entered a six-party alliance with parties including the BJP in 2009.
