= Nexus Mall (Koramangala) =

Nexus Koramangala
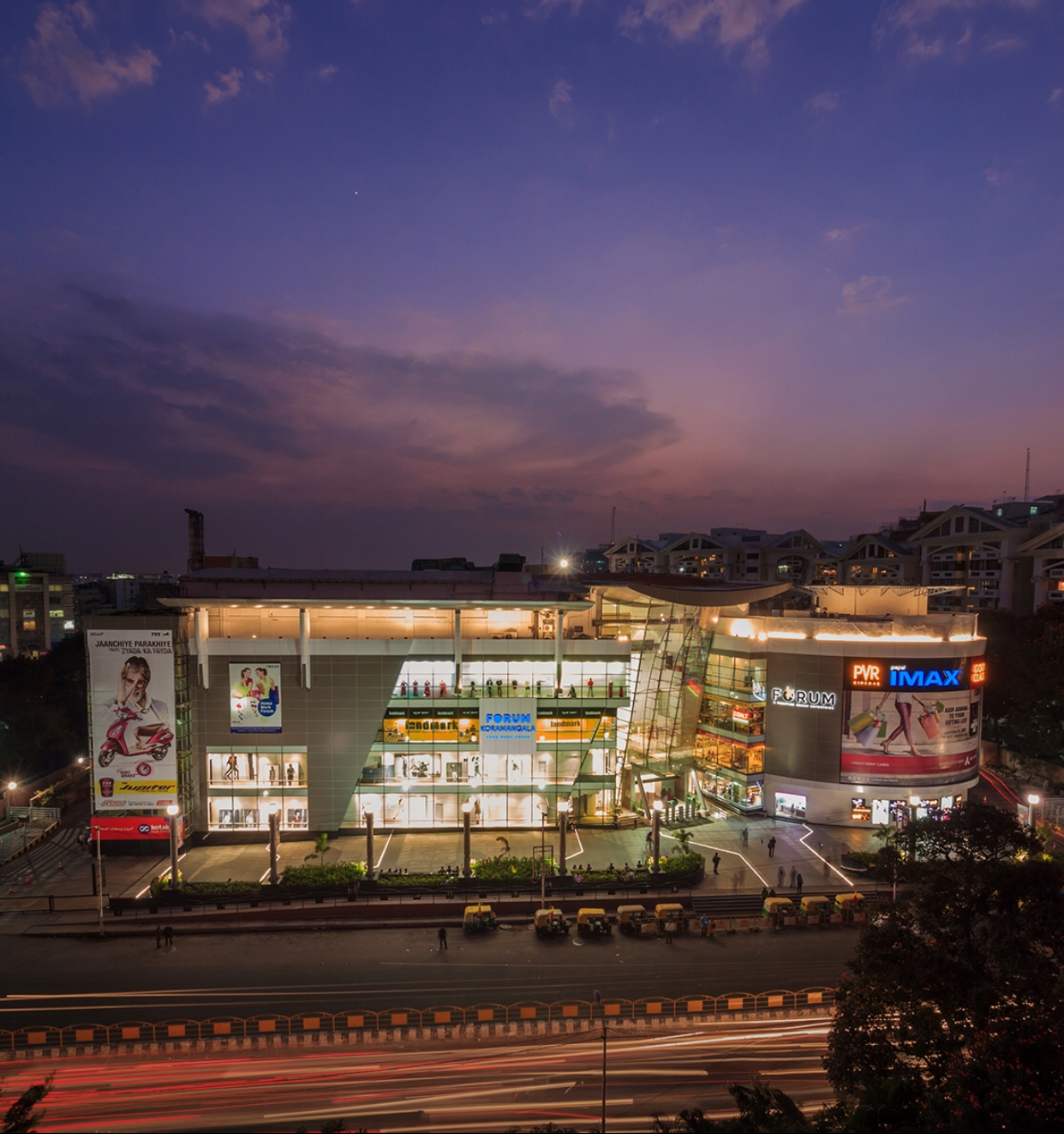
- Location: Bangalore, Karnataka, India
- Coordinates: 12.9344°N 77.6111°E
- Address: Hosur Road, Koramangala
- Opened: 2004
- Developer: Prestige Group
- Floor area: 72,000 m^{2} (780,000 sq ft)
- Floors: 5
- Website: www.nexusselecttrust.com/nexus-koramangala

Nexus Koramangala Mall (formerly Forum Mall) is a shopping mall located on Hosur Road in Koramangala, Bengaluru, Karnataka, India developed by Prestige Group. It is the first shopping mall in the city of Bengaluru, Going previous to JW Marriott hotel.

Nexus Koramangala is the oldest full-fledged mall in Bengaluru with a multi-story book store, 12 cinema screens and other entertainment facilities. The mall is an attraction for tourists. The shopping mall houses 72,000 m^{2} (780,000 sq ft) of shops over five levels. A major attraction at the mall is the multiplex, PVR.

Blackstone renamed the mall from Forum to Nexus in 2022 following its acquisition of the mall from Prestige Group.

== Entertainment and leisure ==
- Retail Shops over 5 floors
- PVR Cinemas
- The Transit Lounge Food court.
- It also houses the first McDonald's outlet in Bengaluru, along with KFC at food area, and several other food and beverage outlets.

== Gallery ==
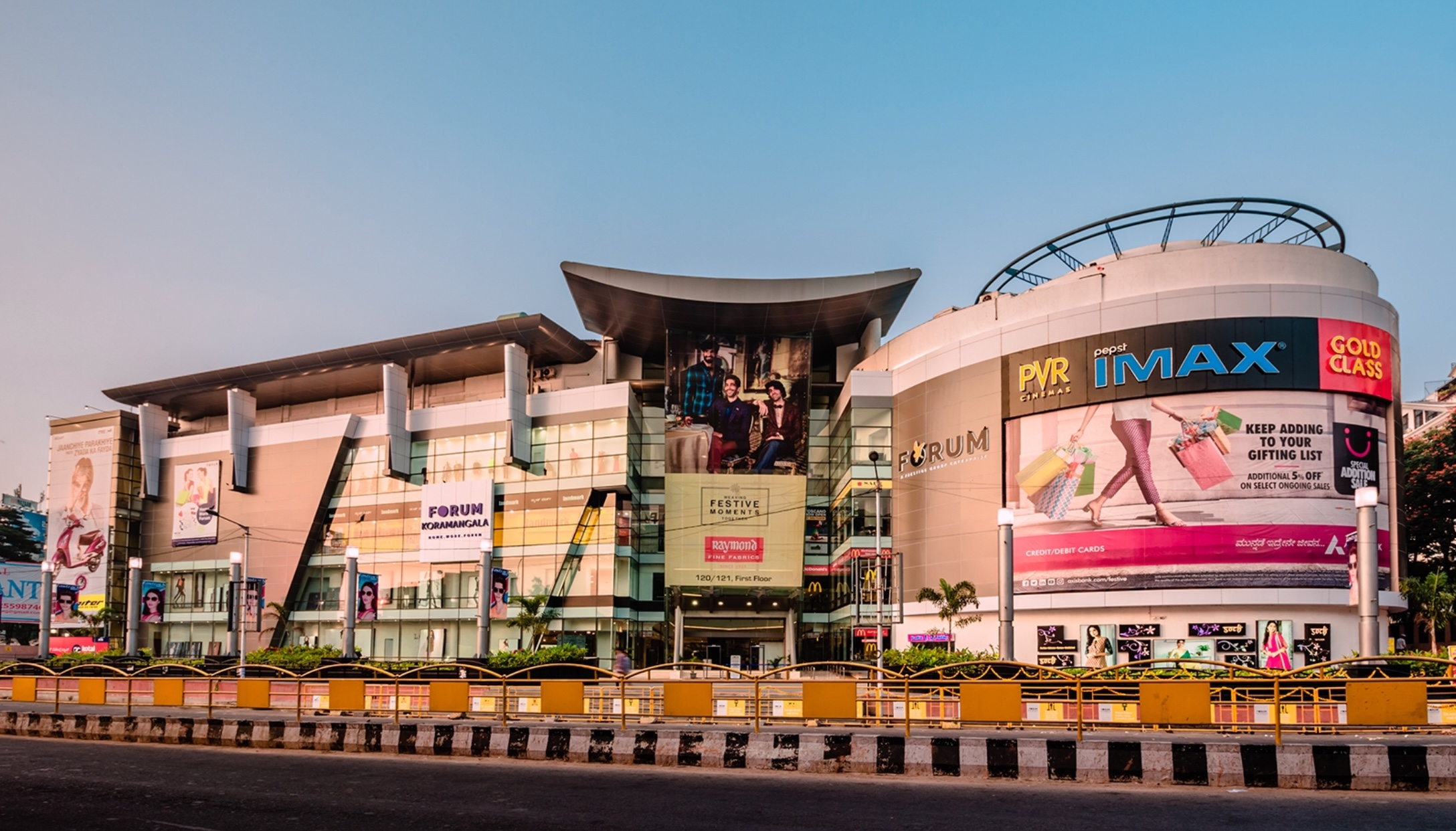
Nexus Mall, Koramangala during the day

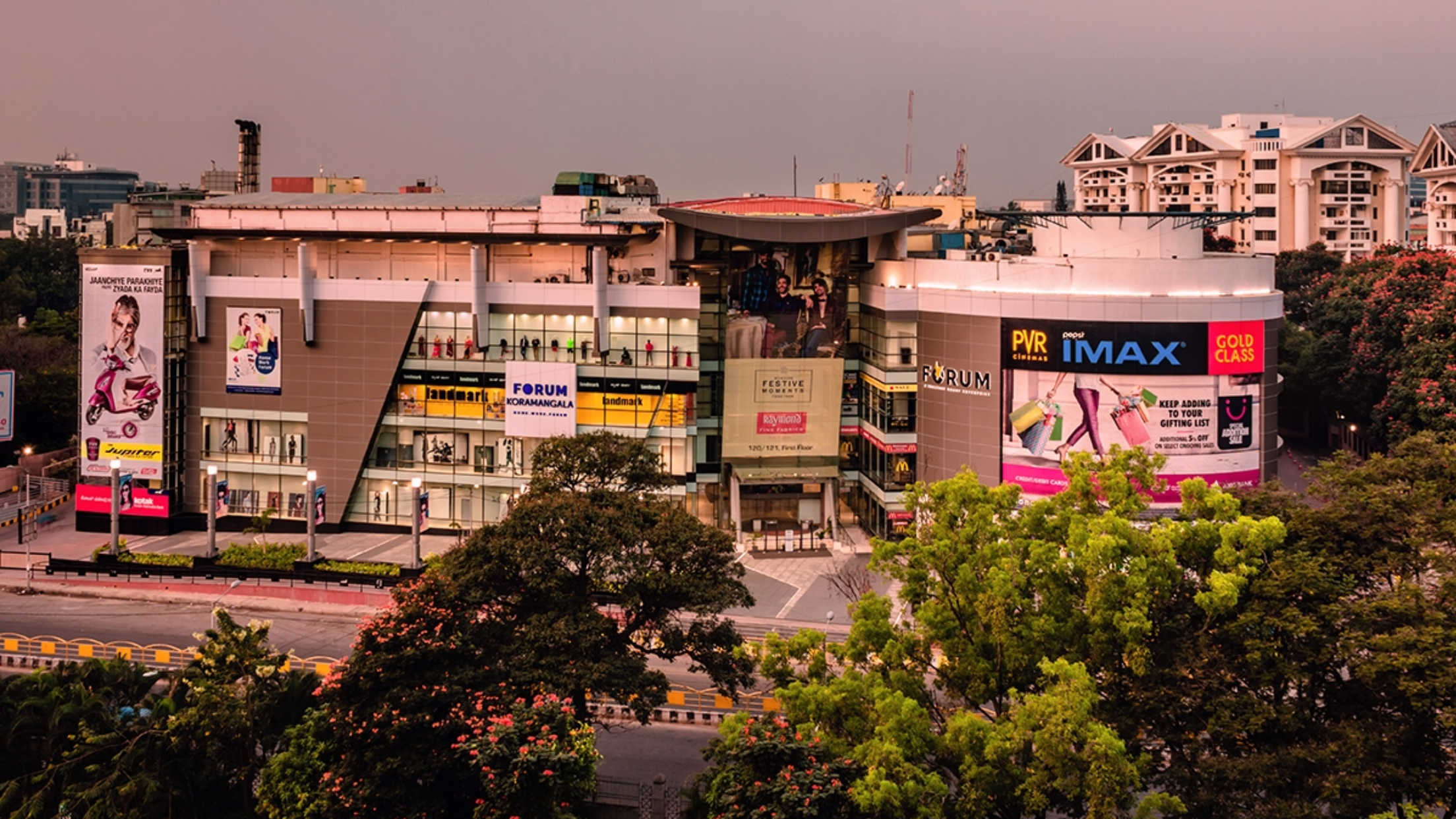
Aerial view of The Nexus Mall

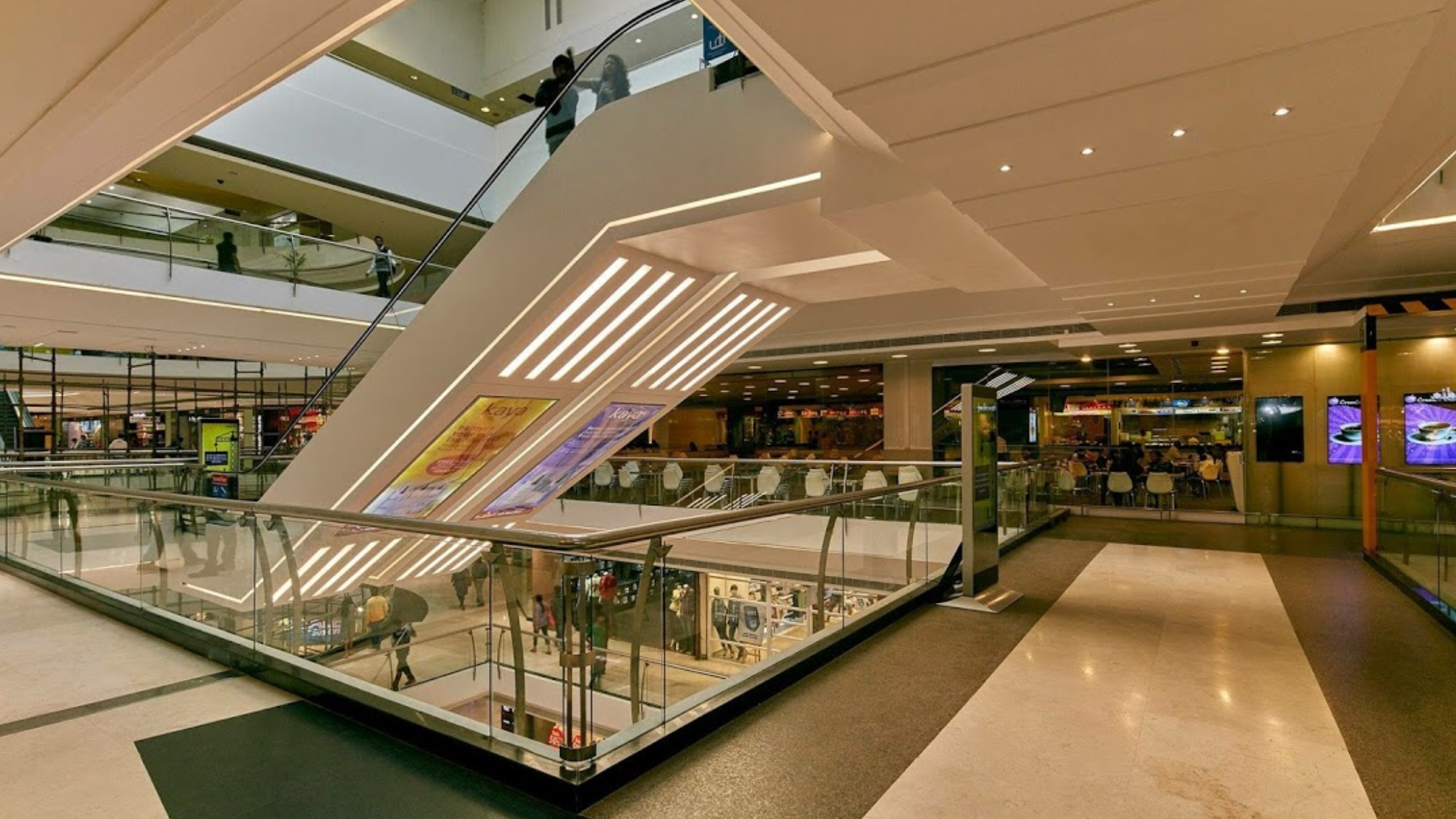
Inside The Nexus Mall

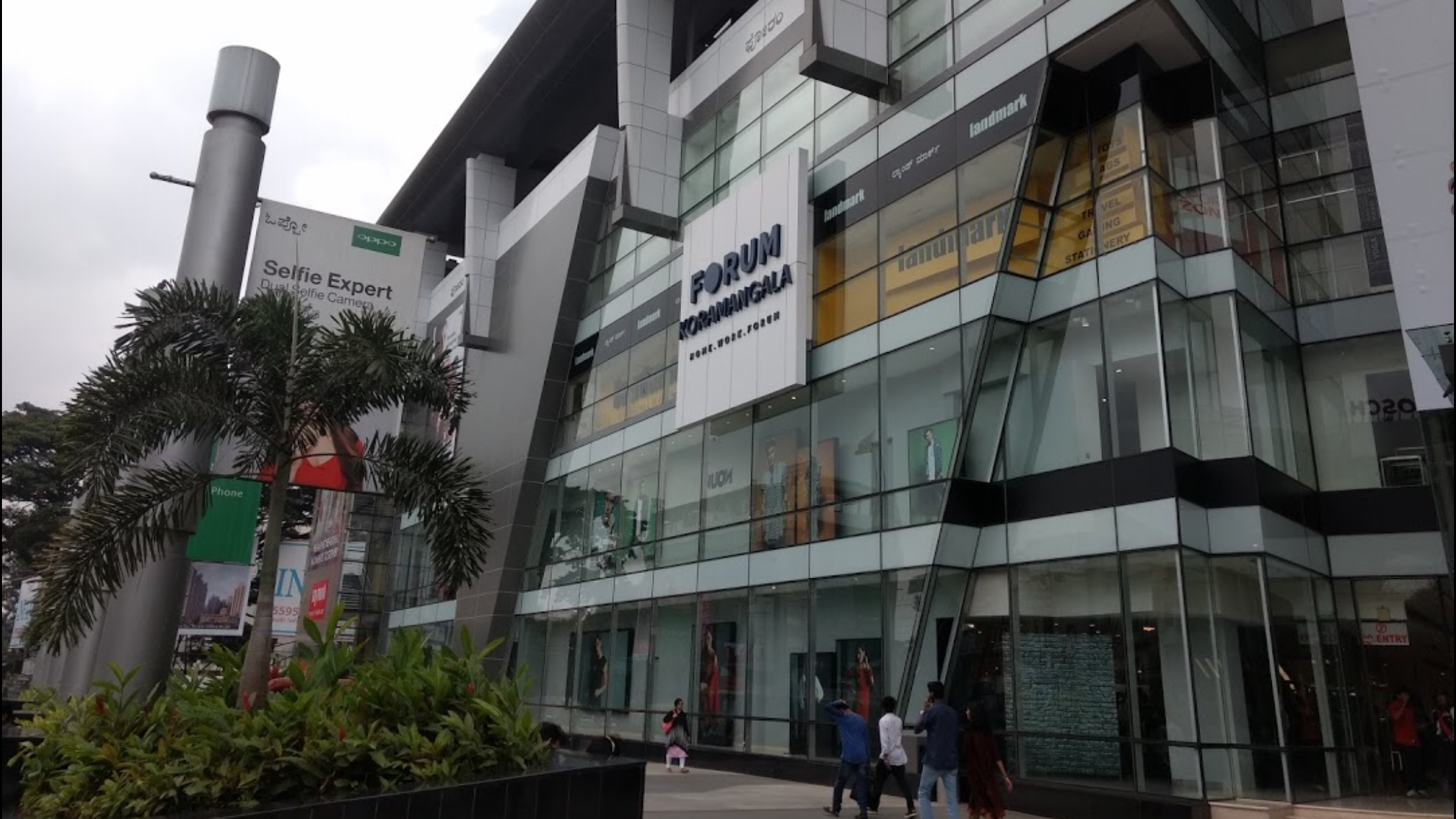
Outside view

== See also ==
- Nexus Vijaya Mall
- List of shopping malls in India
- List of shopping malls in Bengaluru
