= Prestige Group =

Indian property development company

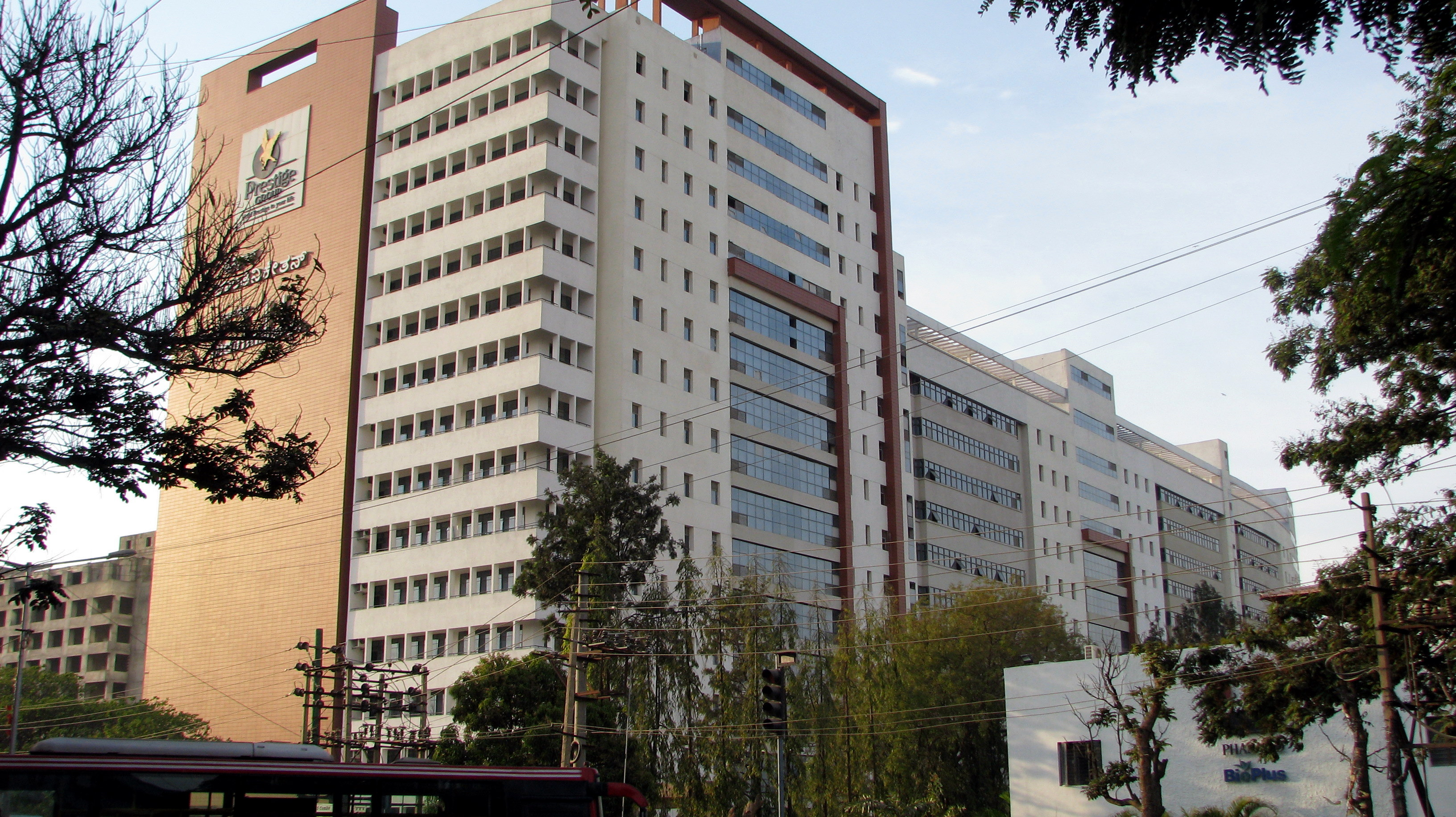
- Prestige Shantiniketan at Whitefield, Bangalore
- Type: Public company
- Traded as: BSE: 533274; NSE: PRESTIGE
- Industry: Real estate
- Founded: 1986
- Founder: Razack Sattar
- Headquarters: Bangalore, Karnataka, India
- Area served: India
- Key people: Irfan Razack, Rezwan Razack, Noaman Razack
- Products: Commercial offices Apartments; Shopping malls Villas; Hotels; Golf courses Leisure & hospitality Retail
- Revenue: US$1.2 billion
- Number of employees: 9850+
- Website: prestigeconstructions.com

Prestige Group is an Indian real estate development company headquartered in Bangalore. Founded by Razack Sattar in 1986, Prestige has developed residential colonies and commercial spaces in Bangalore, Chennai, Kochi, Calicut, Hyderabad, Mumbai, Mangalore, Goa and Delhi-NCR.

Notable projects include Prestige Shantiniketan, UB City, Prestige Golfshire, Prestige Acropolis, The Forum, The Forum Value, The Forum Vijaya, The Celebration Mall, Prestige Lakeside Habitat, The Prestige City and Prestige Kingfisher Towers.

== History ==
Prestige Group was founded by Razack Sattar, a Kutchi Memon. During the 1960s and late 1970s his sons Irfan Razack and Rezwan Razack worked with him, and his youngest son Noaman Razack also joined when the business grew. It began as a retail business, but moved to real estate with its first project, Prestige Court, at KH Road in Bangalore in 1985.
