= Prestige Golfshire =

Golf community in Nandi Hills, Bangalore, India

Prestige Golfshire Club
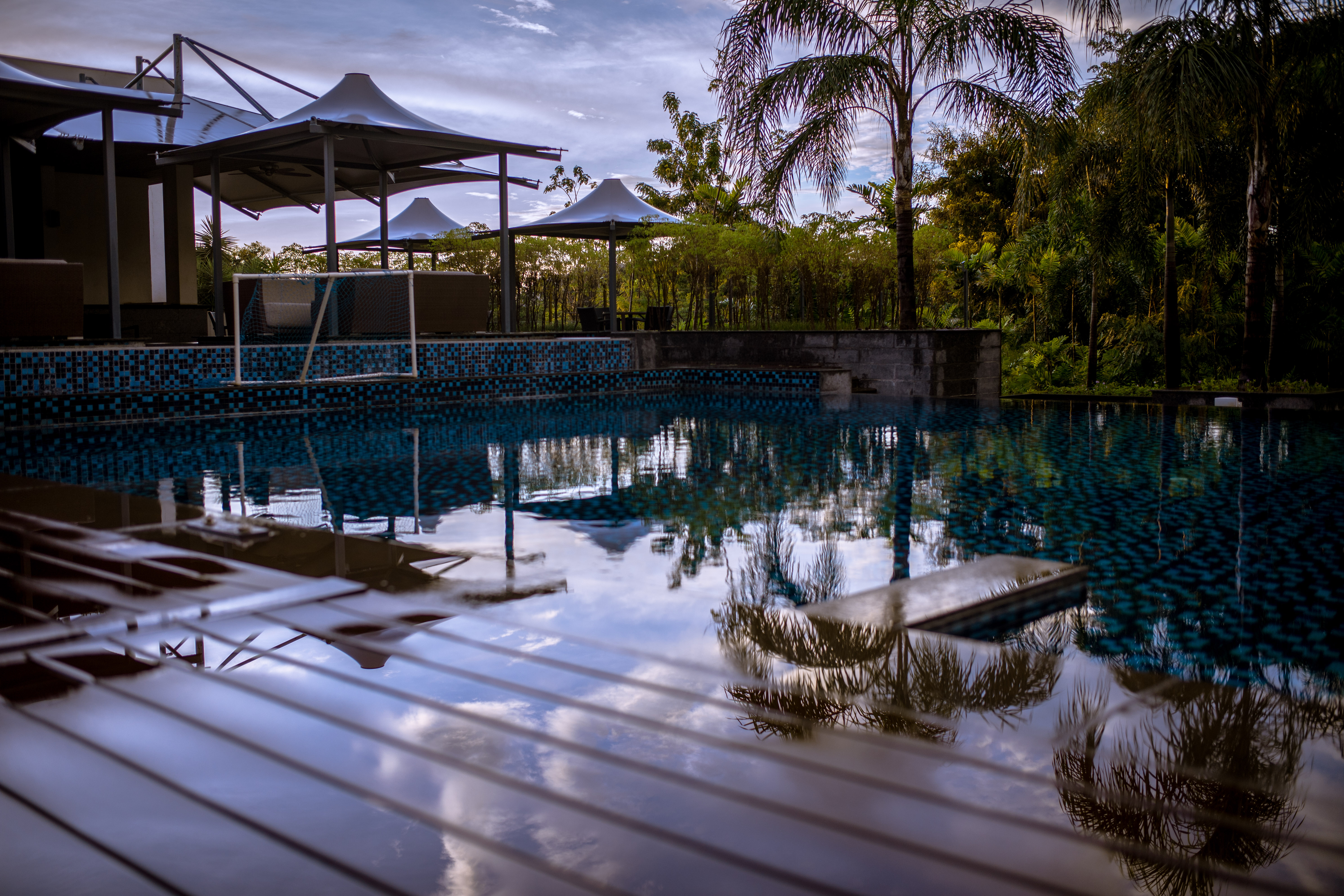
- Interactive map of Prestige Golfshire Club
- 13.16°N 77.42°E

Club information
- Location: Nandi Hills Road, Karahalli Post, Kundana Hobli, Devanahalli Taluk, Bangalore, 562110 Karnataka India
- Established: 2011
- Type: Private
- Owner: Prestige Group
- Operator: Prestige Golfshire Club / Troon Golf
- Total holes: 18
- Tournaments: Pro-Am Golf (2012)
- Website: www.golfshire.com
- Designed by: Bob Hunt – PGA Design Consulting
- Par: 72
- Length: 7004 yards
- Course rating: 73.3/137
- Course record: Uttam Anand (63) Yaniv Gajakos(63)

Prestige Golfshire is a mixed development from Prestige Group consisting of a golf course and independent villas which is located at Nandi Hills, Bangalore, India. This development is spread over an area of 275 acres which has independent mansions, golf course & Club, Marriott Hotels & Resorts, convention centre and artificial lake.

== Golfshire Club ==
Prestige Golfshire Club, is managed by Troon Golf. This 18-hole championship golf course designed by Bob Hunt of PGA Design Consulting is in Semi-Private resort style. The club also features a wellness zone, swimming pool, squash courts and Falcon Greens Restaurant & Bar.

=== Golfing events and tournaments ===
- Bangalore's Anirban Lahiri, along with other 20 top-ranked PGTI players, participated in the first Pro-Am Golf Tournament held at Golfshire Club on 11 March 2012.
- Callaway Golf India & Prestige Golfshire hosted Callaway RAZR Fit Challenge and Shiv Kapur, one of India's top golfers launched the RAZR fit.

== Location ==
Prestige Golfshire is located in the foothills of Nandi Hills on the edge of Lake Karehalli. On a clear day, Nandi Hill is clearly visible from this property.

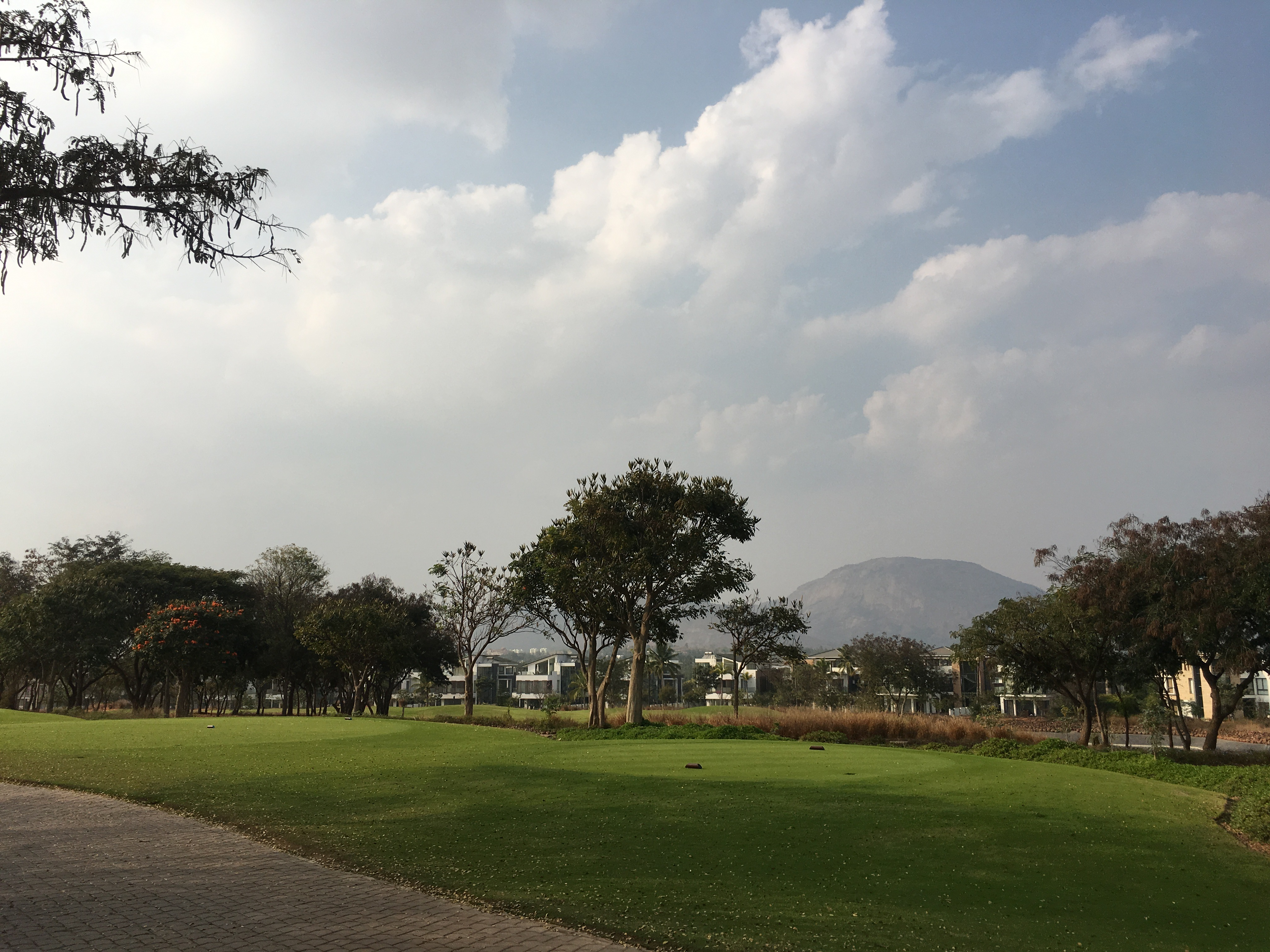
Prestige Golfshire with view of Nandi Hills

== Awards and recognition ==
1. Asia Pacific Property Awards 2011 -Highly Commended Golf Course India
2. Asia Pacific Property Awards 2011 -Highly Commended Golf Development India
3. Cityscape Awards 2009 – Best Mixed Use Development – Future
4. CNBC Asia Pacific Commercial Property Award 2009 – Best Golf Development India
