= Irfan Razack =

Indian businessman

Irfan Razak
- Born: 30 October 1953 (age 72)
- Occupation: Business
- Employer(s): Chairman and Managing Director of Prestige Estates Projects Ltd
- Children: one
- Website: www.prestigeconstructions.com

Irfan Razack (born 30 October 1953) is an Indian billionaire entrepreneur from Bangalore. He is the Chairman and Managing Director of Prestige Group, one of the reputed property developers in India. According to 2024 Forbes India Rich List, he is one of the 100 wealthiest Indians, with a personal wealth of $6 billion, and Prestige was the second largest listed property firm in India.

He is also the Chairman and Co-Founder of Inventure Academy, Bangalore which he founded in the year 2005. He was Honorary secretary of Al-Ameen Educational Society, President of Bangalore Commercial Association (BCA) and Chairman of CREDAI.

He is a Kutchi Memon and has been actively involved in the upliftment of the people of the community through the Kutchi Memon Jamat, Bangalore.

He has received many awards for his business excellence such as Real Estate Excellence Award (2008), Best Developer Award (2009) by Karnataka State Town Planning Development and Entrepreneur Extraordinirine Award (2010) by Builders Association of India and Confederation of Real Estate Developers Association of India.

As per Forbes list of India’s 100 richest tycoons, dated OCTOBER 09, 2024, Irfan Razack & siblings are ranked 49th with a net worth of $6 Billion.

In November 2024, he was awarded the Karnataka Rajyotsava Award, the state's second-highest civilian honour, in recognition of his decades of service in real estate and philanthropy.

== Early life and education ==
Irfan Razack (born 1953) comes from a Kutchi Memon family. His father, Razack Sattar, founded “Prestige House for Men,” a small fabric and tailoring shop on Commercial Street, Bengaluru, in 1956. Razack holds a Bachelor of Arts in Economics from Bangalore University.

== Career ==
In 1986, Irfan Razack formally established Prestige Estates Projects Limited, expanding the family business from retail into real estate development. Under his leadership, the company developed major residential, commercial, retail, and hospitality projects across Bengaluru, Chennai, Hyderabad, Kochi, and Mumbai.

Prestige Estates became one of India’s largest listed real estate developers after its IPO in 2010, and diversified into malls, hotels, and integrated townships.

Razack has also served as President of the Bangalore Commercial Association, Chairman of CREDAI Bengaluru, and Honorary Secretary of the Al-Ameen Educational Society.

== Awards and recognitions ==
Irfan Razack has received several awards and honours for his contributions to real estate and business leadership. He was conferred the title of Fellow of the Royal Institution of Chartered Surveyors (FRICS) in 2013.

He received the Real Estate Professional of the Year Award at the Real Estate Excellence Awards (2008), and the Best Developer Award (2009–10) from the Government of Karnataka’s Department of Town Planning.

In 2010, he was honoured with the Entrepreneur Extraordinaire Award by the Builders Association of India and CREDAI. He later received the Sir M. Visvesvaraya Memorial Award in 2015 for excellence in the field of construction and infrastructure.

In 2024, the Government of Karnataka honoured him with the Rajyotsava Award, the state’s second-highest civilian honour.

He has also been recognised by India Today as Best CEO in the Real Estate category in 2022.

== Controversies and legal issues ==
Prestige Estates Projects Ltd., led by Razack, was part of a long-running land dispute concerning 3.2 acres at Pattandur Agrahara, near Whitefield, Bengaluru. In August 2022, a division bench of the Karnataka High Court upheld an earlier order that brought relief to Prestige Estates and Joy Ice Creams in the matter.

Razack has also figured in tax litigation. In 2014, the Karnataka High Court decided an appeal titled Commissioner of Income Tax v. Irfan Razack, Director of Prestige Estate Projects (P) Ltd concerning income-tax matters.

Prestige Estates has also been a party to consumer disputes in various fora, typical of large real-estate developers; for example, proceedings recorded in State Consumer Disputes Redressal Commissions in 2014 and later years.
