= Prestige Shantiniketan =

Prestige Shantiniketan (PSN), Bengaluru
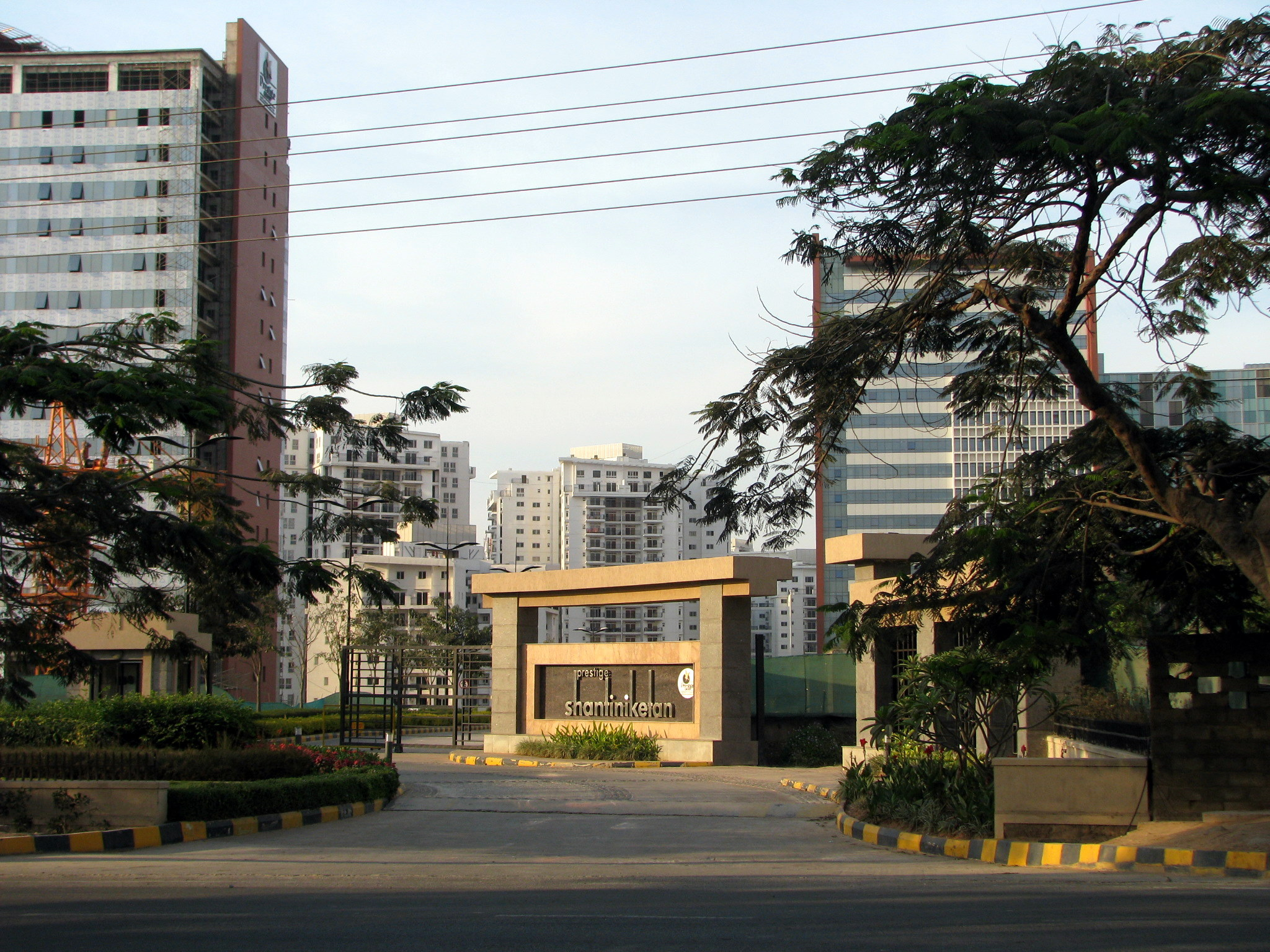
- Interactive map of the Prestige Shantiniketan (PSN), Bengaluru area

General information
- Status: Completed
- Type: Integrated Township
- Location: Bengaluru, Karnataka, India
- Coordinates: 12.994106°N 77.728755°E
- Construction started: 15 August 2013; 12 years ago

Height
- Top floor: 18/19

Technical details
- Floor count: 20 including roof
- Lifts/elevators: 2/3 per towers

Design and construction
- Developer: Prestige Group

Prestige Shantiniketan is an integrated township in Whitefield, Bengaluru on a total of 105 acres developed by Prestige group, jointly with D. K. Adikesavulu Naidu on a land owned by him. It is the first integrated township in Bengaluru and the largest fully constructed township in Bengaluru as of 2017.

== Precincts ==
Prestige Shantiniketan is divided into 3 Precincts - Residential, Business and Hospitality. Only the residential precinct is a part of the apartment, the other two precincts are owned by the builders, Prestige Group, and not the apartment.

=== Residential Precinct ===
The Residential Precinct has an area of 67 acres and includes 24 high rise Towers housing a total of 3002 apartments. This precinct includes an 8-acre park known as the Central Park.

=== Business Precinct ===
Consists of 3.2 million square feet of office space spread across seven towers.

Three towers are 16 floors each and the remaining four towers are 12 floors each. Six of these seven towers are in a single crescent-shaped building. The other tower is in a separate building of its own (near the Nexus Shantiniketan Mall).

Several multinational corporations, including ExxonMobil, VMware, Alcon Laboratories, Tata Consultancy Services, Wipro, Nielsen Sports, Hindustan Unilever, Flowserve India, Britannia, Capgemini, Canon, AIG, Caterpillar, Huawei Technology, Thermo Fisher Scientific, Genisys Group, AirWatch, UST GLOBAL, Synapse Design, GWM, Tata Elxsi, Brady Company India are tenants.

ExxonMobil has occupied major portion of Crescent building. GE Digital occupies 7 floors of Tower C within the complex.

== Hospitality Project ==
The Prestige Group has included a 5 Star Sheraton Hotel near the apartment and a 2000-person, state of the art Convention Center (Sheraton Grand Bengaluru Whitefield Hotel & Convention Center). It has also built the Forum Shantiniketan Mall that includes a multiplex among other luxury retail shops and restaurants. However, the mall, hotel and convention centre are not on land owned by Prestige Shantiniketan, but are present on land owned by the builders, Prestige Group.

== Accidents ==
The construction of Prestige Shantiniketan witnessed multiple accidents and casualties.

=== Collapse of Tower C during construction ===
On 23 October 2008, 14 floors of Tower C collapsed during construction. The incident raised several concerns about safety of the buildings in Prestige Shantiniketan. The body of construction worker Munna Katwa (23), a native of Orissa, was found in the debris on November 12 after a prolonged search of 20 days. The incident prompted Upa-Lokayukta Justice Patri Basavanagoud to take up a suo moto inquiry against the construction company. Mysteriously, a body of a security guard Shivanna (41) who worked at the construction site, was found near the railway tracks a day after the Tower collapse.

=== Collapse of car parking complex ===
In 2008, during the construction of car-parking complex, the collapse of the under-construction structure killed 2 workers. The deceased workers were identified as Prasanjith Bohra (26) and Sanjeev Dutt (25), both natives of West Bengal. Several executives of the builder were taken in to custody following the incident.

== Awards ==
- Asia Pacific Property Awards 2011 - Mixed Use Architecture India
- Asia Pacific Property Awards 2011 - Mixed Use Development India

== Gallery ==
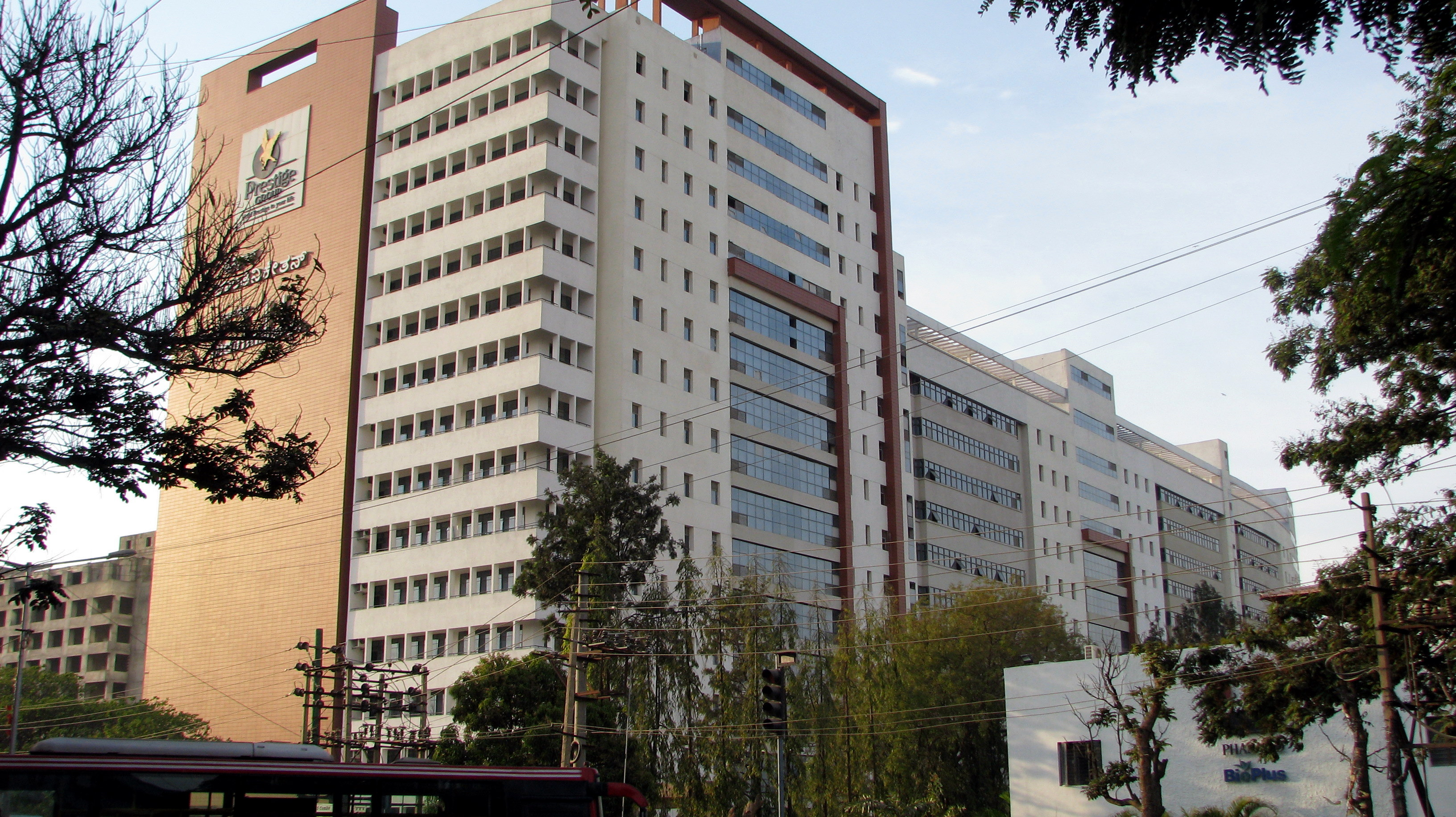
Prestige Shantiniketan

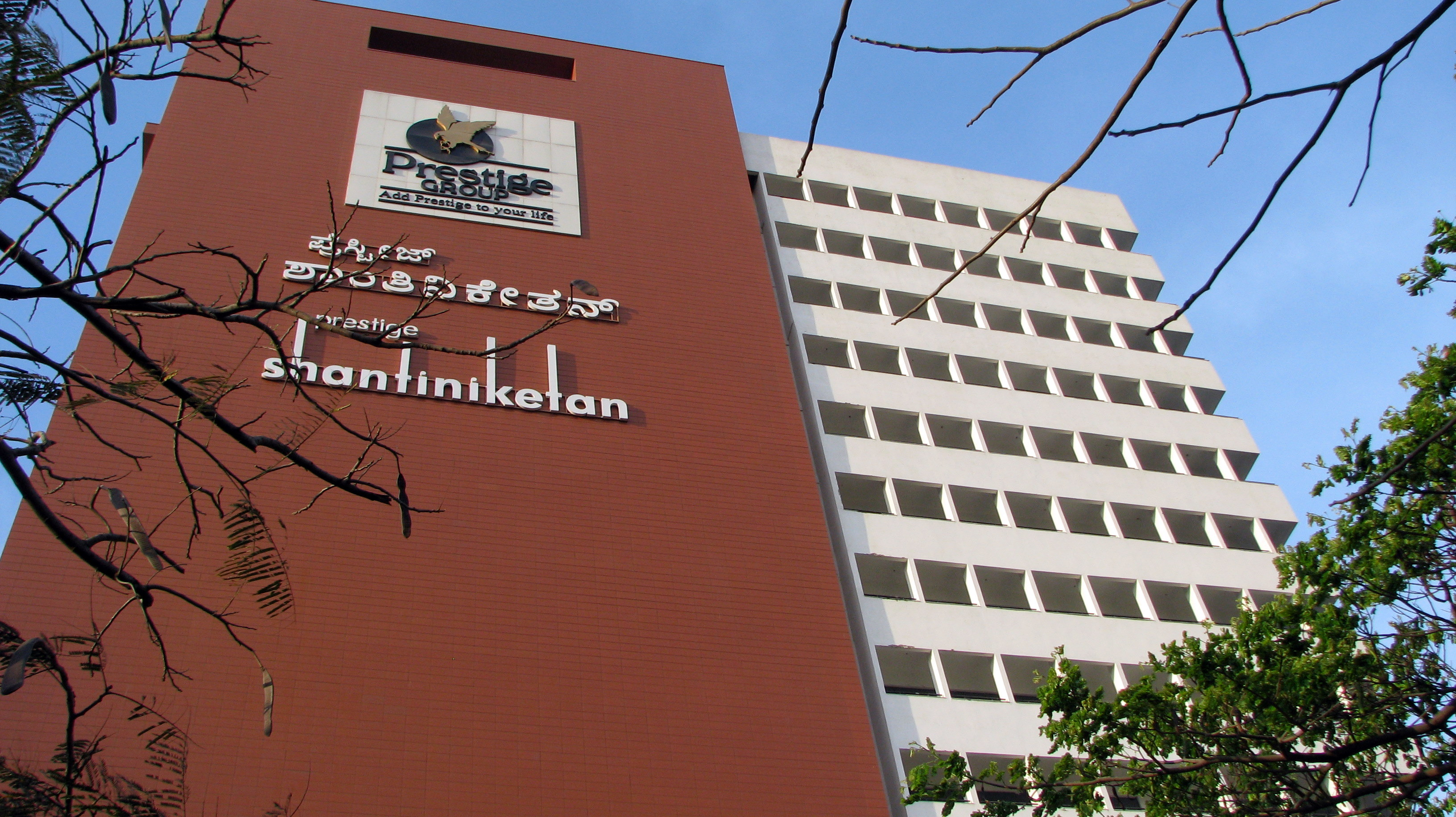
Prestige Shantiniketan

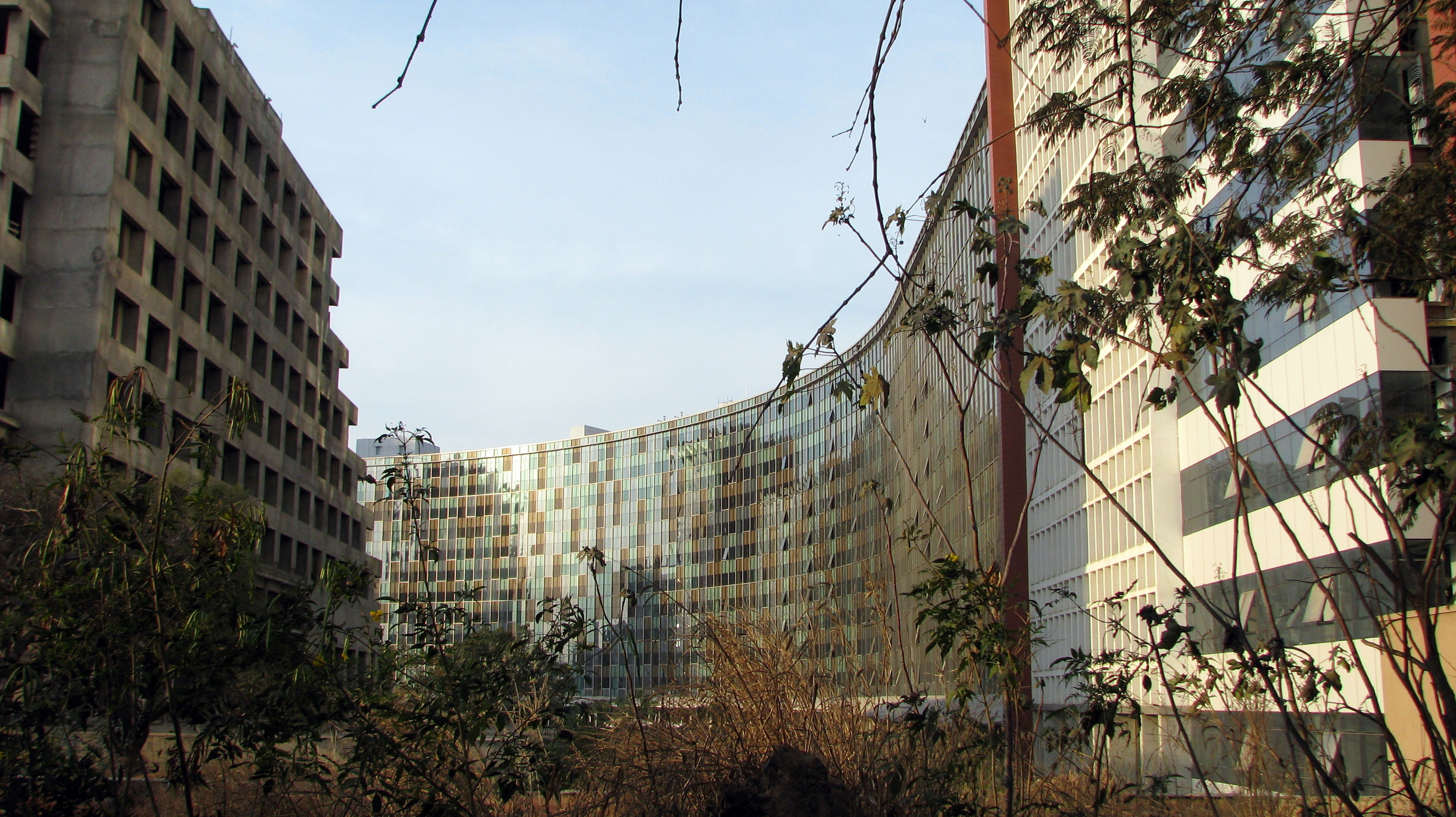
Prestige Shantiniketan Business Centre
