= Vengeeswarar Temple =

Religion
- Affiliation: Hinduism
- District: Chennai
- Deity: Lord (Shiva)

Location
- Location: Vadapalani
- State: Tamil Nadu
- Country: India
- Interactive map of Vengeeswarar Temple

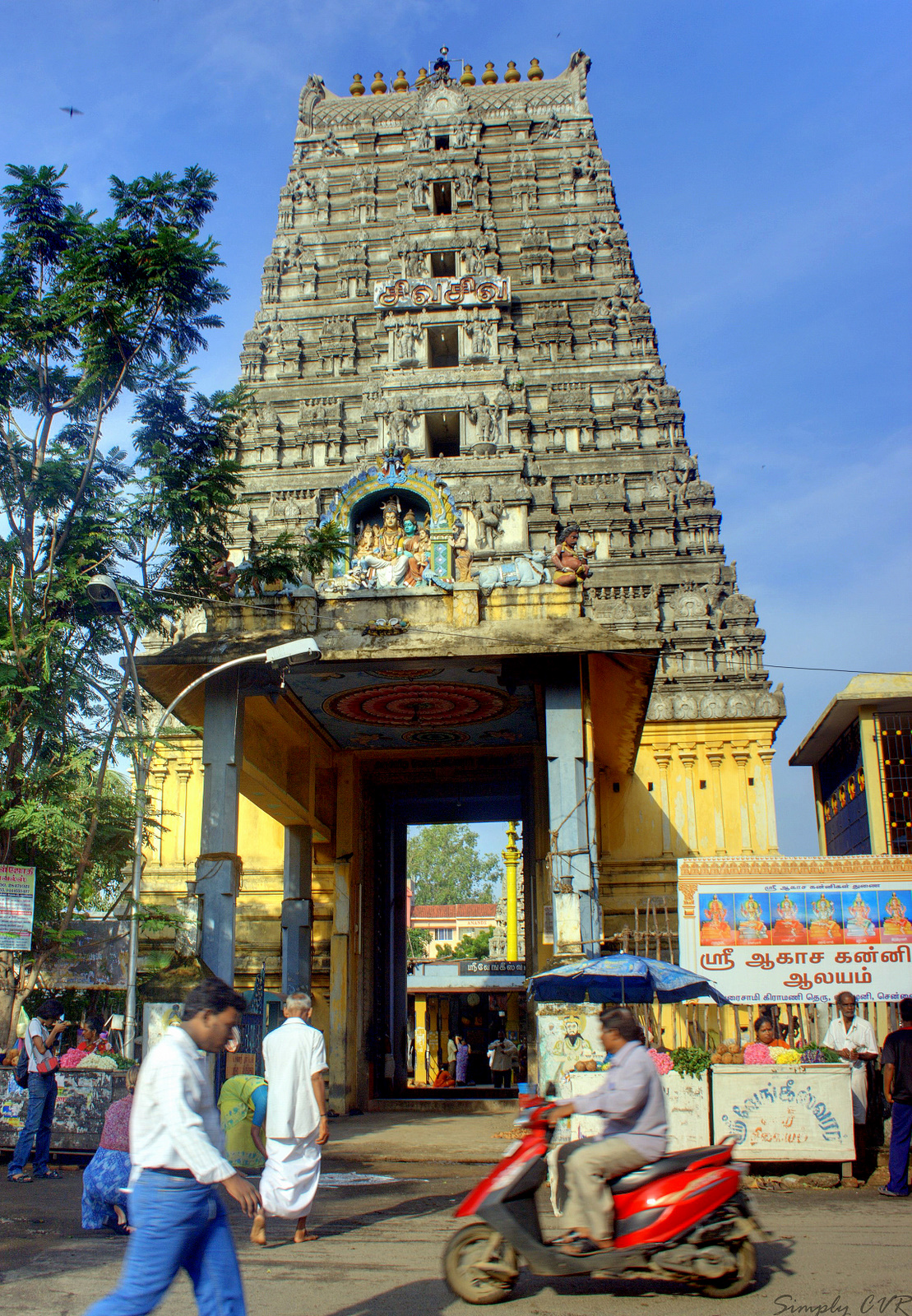
Vengeeswarar Kovil

The Vengeeswarar Temple is a Hindu temple situated in the neighbourhood of Vadapalani in Chennai, India. Though the sthalam (complex) dates back to vedic age, the temple structure is over 1000 years old and is one of the oldest Hindu temples in the city. The temple is dedicated to Shiva, known as Lord Vengeeswarar and the goddess is called Saanthanayaki Ambal. The entrance to this temple is crowned with a big rajagopuram (chief tower) adorned with several stucco images. Other deities in the temple include Ganapathi, Kasi Viswanathar and Visalakshi, Bairavar, Lord Subramanya, and Goddess Gajalakshmi. There is a separate shrine for Lord Saneeswarar. With the expansion of the city, the elegance of this temple is said to have dwindled in the urban proliferation. Much of its space has been lost to road widening and metro rail over the decades.

== Festivals ==
Pradhosha pooja is one of the most important among the rituals performed to Lord Shiva. Pradhosham is observed in the evening of the trayodasi (thirteenth moon day) between 4.30 p.m. to 6.00 p.m. during each Shukla Paksha (the 15-day period between a new moon and a full moon) and Krishna Paksha (the 15-day period between a full moon and a new moon), thus occurring once in every fifteen days. Pradhosha time is said to be specially meant for praying Lord Shiva. Praying during that time is believed to free the believers from their sins and gives 'moksha' (heaven) finally (hence the name Pradhosham).

== See also ==
- Religion in Chennai
