= Vadapalani =

Neighbourhood in Chennai district, Tamil Nadu, India

- Neighbourhood
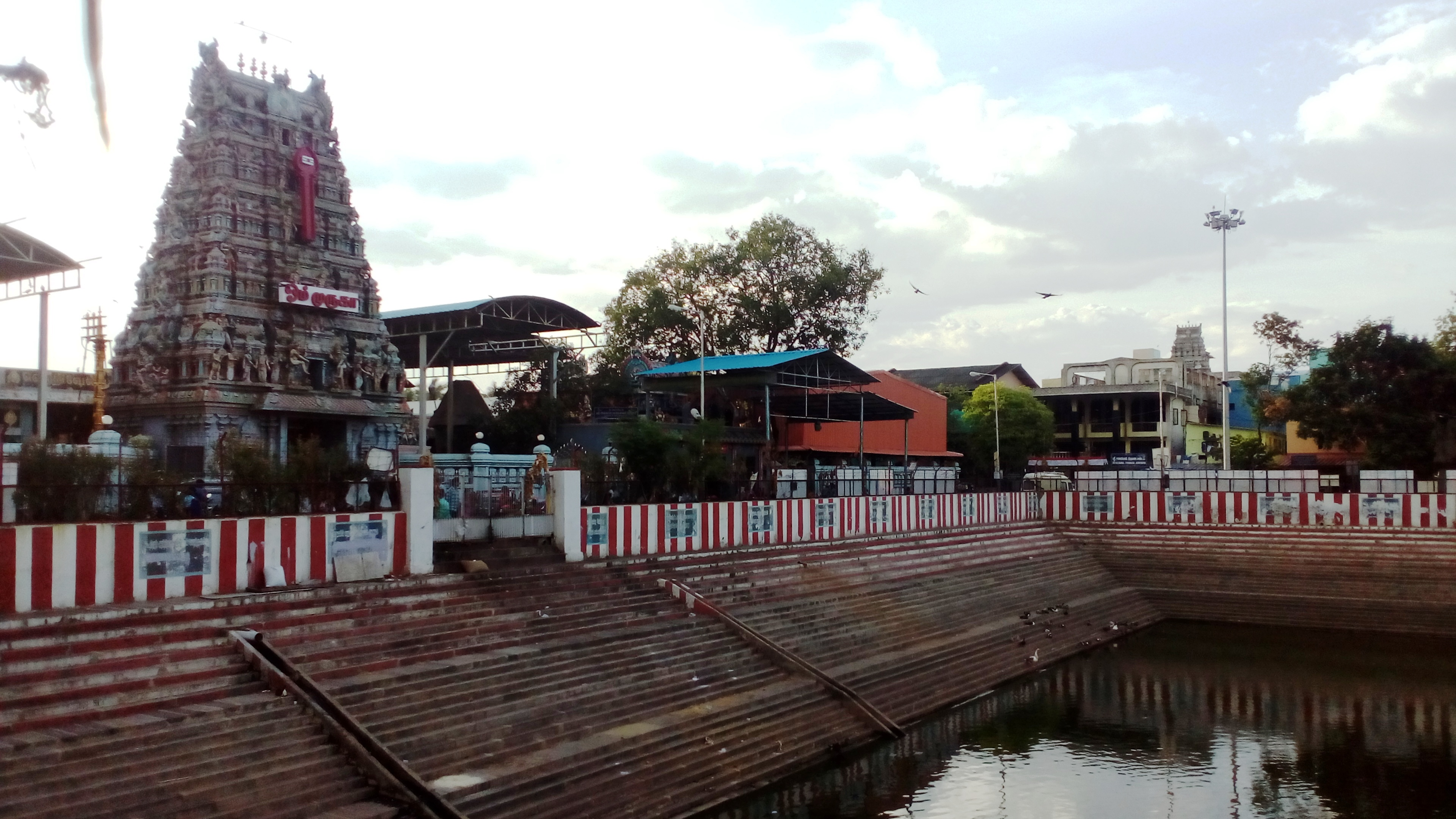
- Vadapalani Andavar Temple

- Vadapalani வடபழனி (Chennai) Vadapalani (Tamil Nadu) Vadapalani (India)
- Coordinates: 13.049713°N 80.212555°E
- Country: India
- State: Tamil Nadu
- District: Chennai
- Metro: Chennai
- Zone: Kodambakkam
- Ward: 121/131
- Elevation: 56 m (184 ft)

Languages
  - Official: Tamil
- Time zone: UTC+5:30 (IST)
- PIN: 600026
- Vehicle registration: TN 10 (RTO, Chennai South West)
- Lok Sabha constituency: Chennai South
- State Legislative Assembly: T.Nagar

Vadapalani is a neighbourhood in the city of Chennai in Tamil Nadu, India. It is known for its film studios, the Vadapalani Andavar Temple, and Vengeeswarar Temples which are important pilgrimage centres for Hindus. Situated in the western part of Chennai, Vadapalani is an important bus terminus on Arcot Road. Vadapalani is one of the busiest and densely populated areas in Chennai.

== History ==
The name Vada-Palani means North Palani. This place is famous for its Palani Andavar Temple, dedicated to Lord Murugan, built in the late 19th century.

It is said that people who cannot undertake the pilgrimage to the Palani can visit the Vadapalani temple with their offerings. Palaniandavar (Lord Muruga) is said to shower devotees with his blessings just the same as in Palani Murugan Temple.

With the presence of this famous temple, since the late 19th century, the area developed into a metropolitan socio-economic hub of attraction and became a part of Chennai city.

== Malls ==
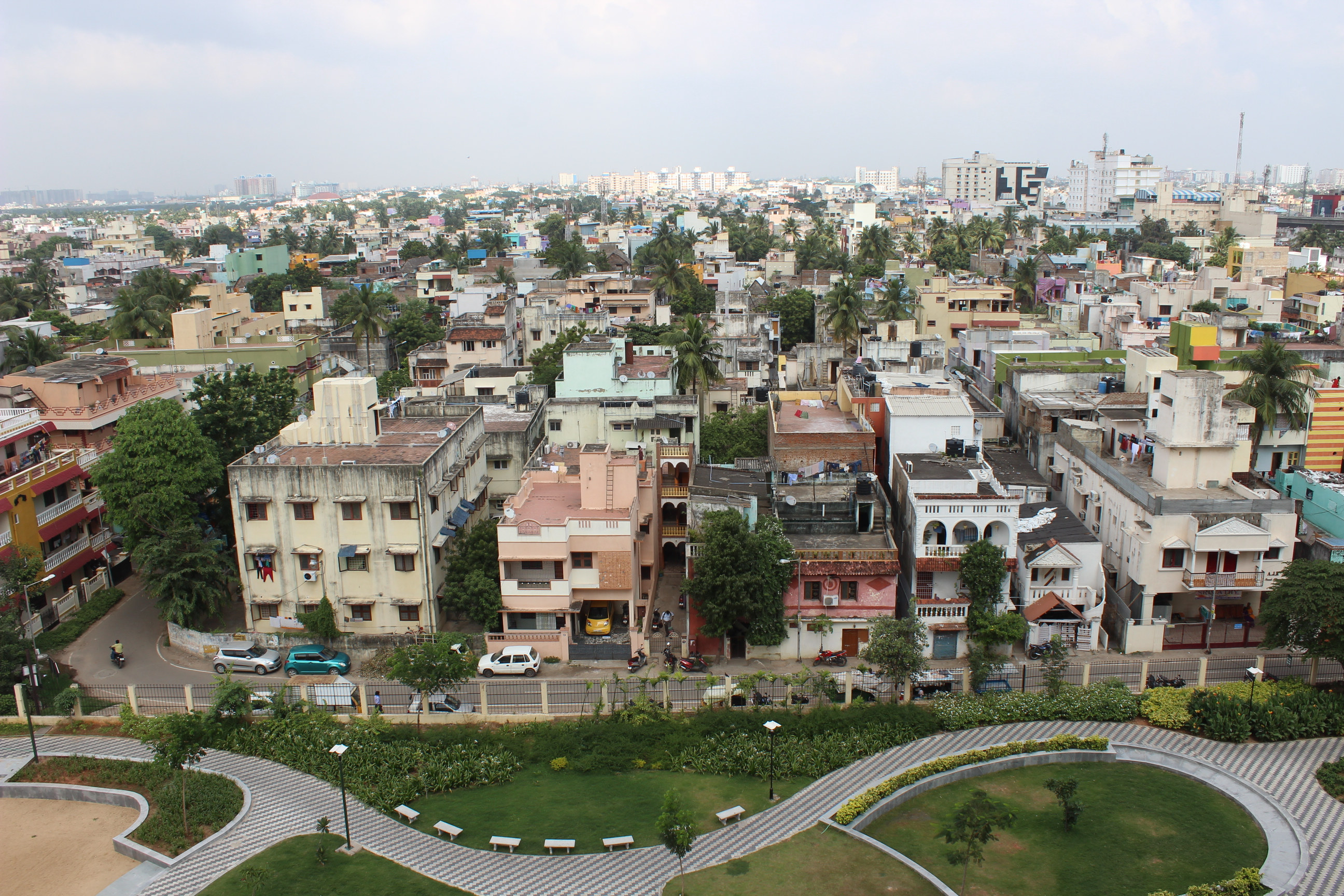
This is Vadapalani residential area.

The Nexus Vijaya Mall, the biggest mall in the neighbourhood, is located on Arcot Road. The mall comprises a total of 14,72,000 sq.ft of floor space including 6 levels of retail space and 13 levels of parking space.

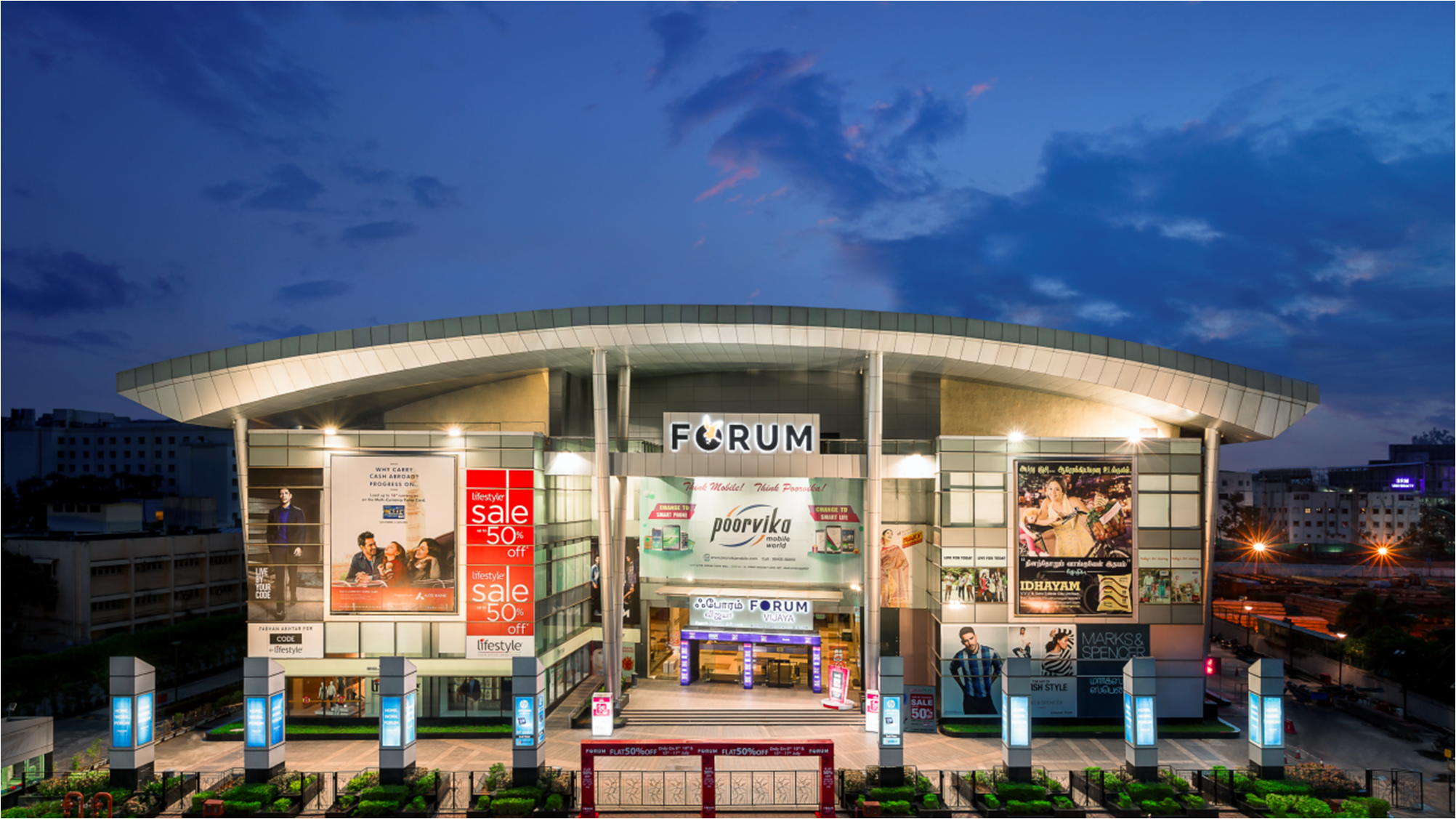
The Forum Vijaya Mall

== Film industry ==
Along with Kodambakkam, Vadapalani is well known for its film studios and other cine infrastructure. The Vijaya Vauhini Studios, Vikram Studios are located in the neighbourhood, whereas the Prasad Colour Lab and Prasad Studios, Efx Studios, and AVM Studio are in the adjacent Saligramam area. The residence of several actors are located in Vadapalani.

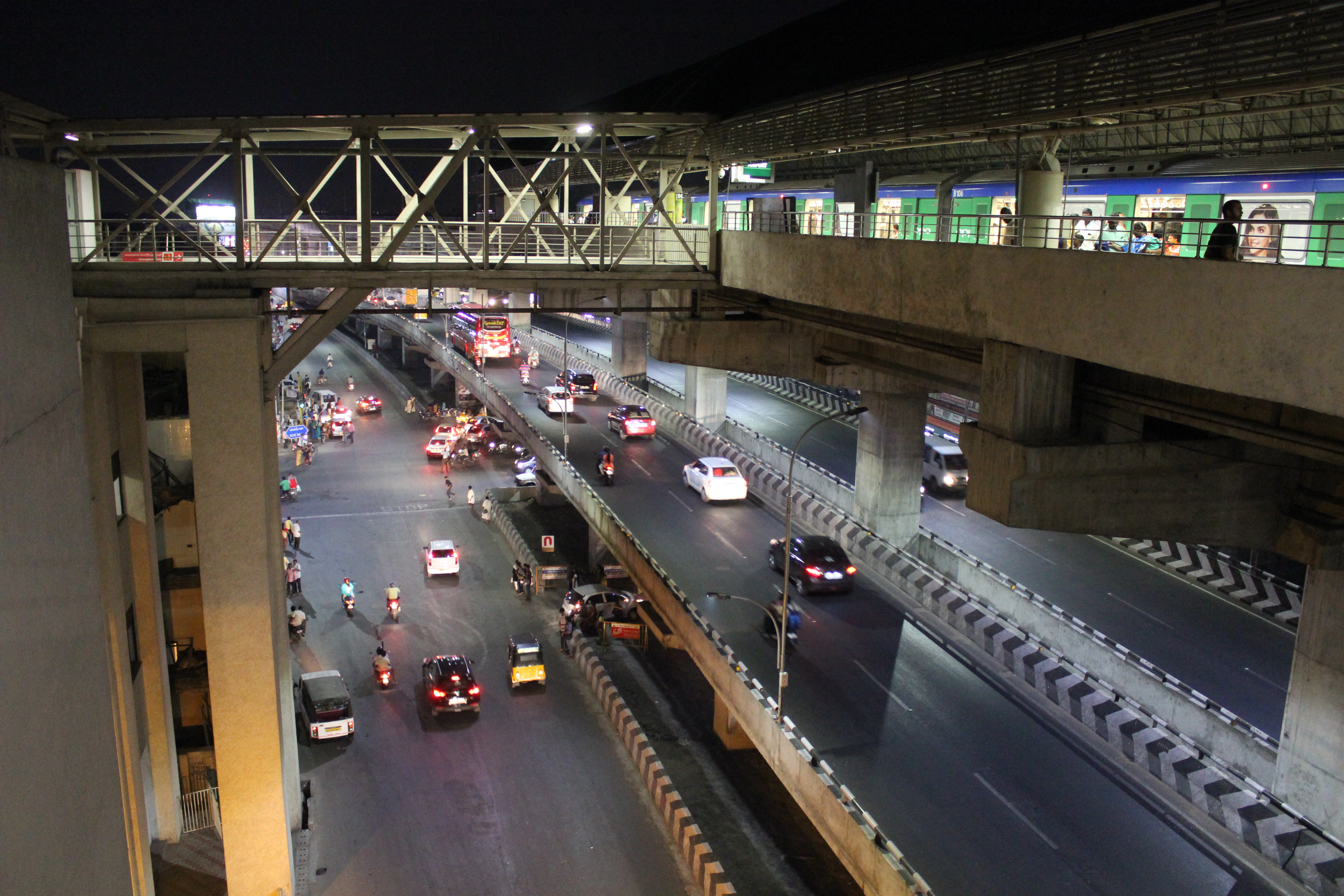
Vadapalani Metro Station

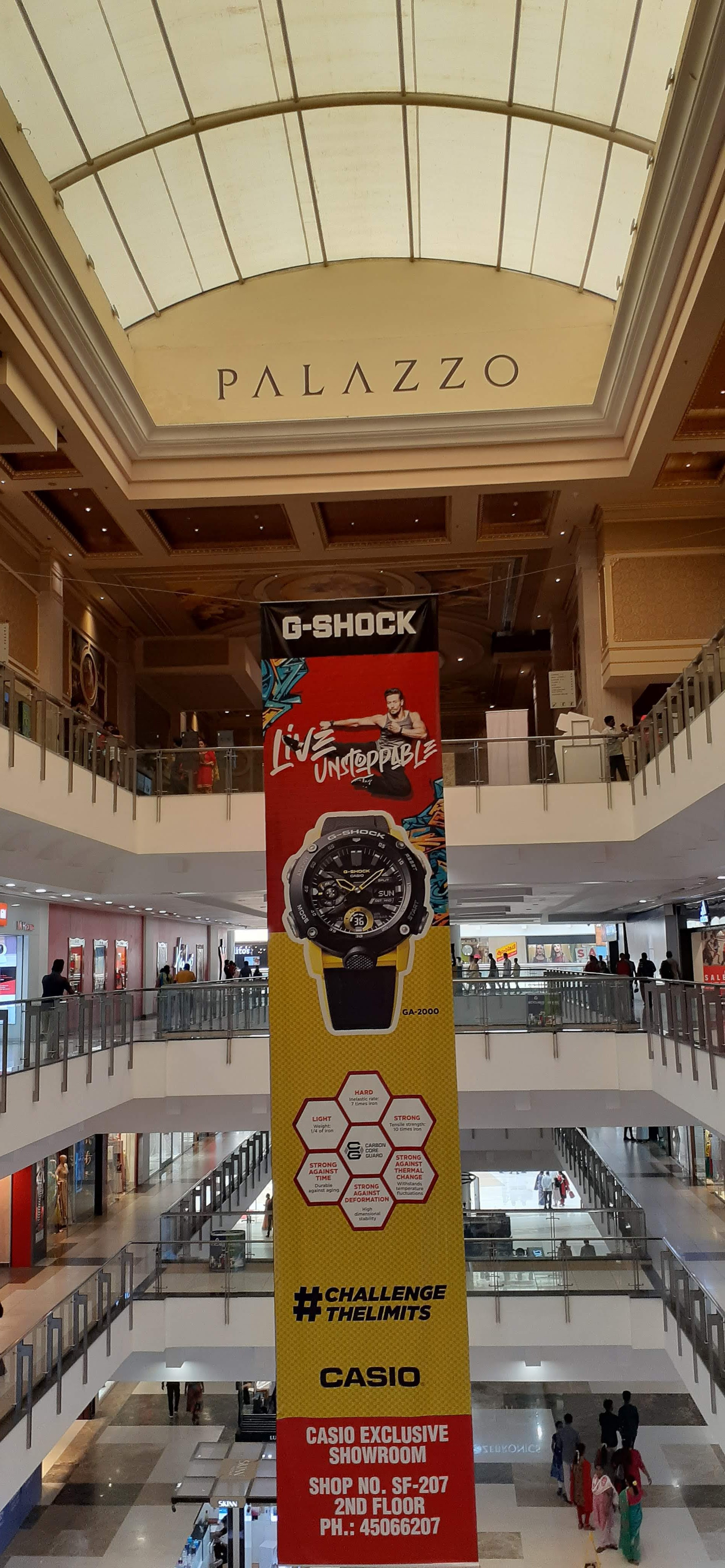
Inside The Forum Vijaya Mall

== Schools ==
Saraswati Vidyalaya, established in 1956, is one of the oldest schools. JRK School developed by Kandhuvati Shanthakumari, a resident, JRM, Karthikeyan Matriculation, Vadapalani Senior Secondary School are some of the important schools in Vadapalani. Ramalinga Mission Middle School, which is established in 1952, is situated in Gangappa Street and is the oldest school in the area.

There are several schools located in the nearby areas such as Velankanni Matric Higher Secondary School and Kendra Vidyalaya in Ashok Nagar, Avichi Higher Secondary School in Virugambakkam, General Cariappa Higher Secondary School and Child Fruit Matriculation School and Ramalinga Mission Middle School (Tamil Medium) (established in 1952) at Gangappa Street in Saligramam. Many children from Vadapalani do their schooling in these neighbouring areas.

== Colleges and universities ==
SRM Institute of Science and Technology has established one of its campus at Vadapalani in 2009. Apollo Medskills is located in West Sivan Koil Street, offering diploma courses in paramedics courses. The birth of SASTRA University Chennai campus for arts has also been incepted in the year 2023.

== Hospitals ==
Vadapalani is known for its health care infrastructure, with several major hospitals having their facility in the neighbourhood. SRM Institute of Medical Science (SIMS), Vijaya Hospital, Vijaya Health Centre, Sooriya Hospital, Rajiv Scans, Akash Institute of fertility & Research, Vasan Eyecare, Best Hospital, Vadapalani Multi-Speciality Hospital, Medall healthcare private limited (Precision Diagnostics), and P&G Nursing Home are prominent medical centres located in Vadapalani. Fortis Malar is also coming up in the locality.

== Theaters ==
Kamala Cinemas and AVM Rajeshwari are well-known theaters in Vadapalani. The Forum Mall has the Palazzo Theater. SSR Pangajam and INOX National(Fame National) are situated Saligramam and Virugambakkam areas.

== Neighbourhood newspapers ==
- Arcot Road Talk
- Vadapalani Talk
- Vadapalani Jobs
