= Inventure Academy =

Coordinates: 12.894748°N 77.745544°E

Inventure Academy, Bangalore
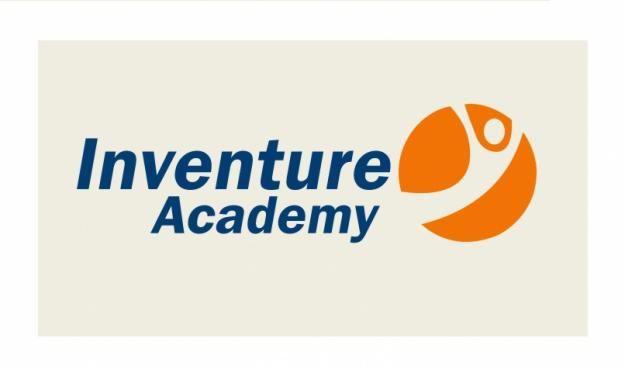
- Whitefield - Sarjapur Road, Chikkavaderapura, Near Dommasandra Circle, Bangalore - 562125, Karnataka, India

Information
- Type: Cambridge Assessment International Education (IGCSE, AS & A Levels)
- Established: 2005
- Grades: Pre-primary – Grade 12
- Campuses: Whitefield–Sarjapur Road; Yeshwanthpur; Whitefield (Preschool)
- Campus type: Urban
- Website: http://www.inventureacademy.com

Inventure Academy is a private international day school based in Bengaluru, India. Established in 2005, the school offers education from pre-primary to Grade 12 and follows the Cambridge Assessment International Education (CAIE) curriculum, including IGCSE and AS/A Levels.

== History ==
Inventure Academy was founded in 2005 with an initial cohort of students from Grades 1 to 7. Over time, the school expanded to include early years education and senior secondary grades.

The school has introduced initiatives such as Model United Nations programmes and student-led projects, and has engaged in collaborations related to public education.

In 2023, the school expanded with the launch of its Yeshwanthpur campus.

== Campuses ==
Inventure Academy operates campuses in Bengaluru, including the Whitefield–Sarjapur Road campus, Yeshwanthpur campus, and an early years campus in Whitefield.

The campuses include classrooms, laboratories, libraries, performing arts spaces, and sports facilities.

== Academics ==
Inventure Academy follows the Cambridge Assessment International Education (CAIE) curriculum, with students appearing for IGCSE and AS/A Level examinations.

The academic programme includes interdisciplinary and project-based approaches across grade levels.

== Co-curricular activities ==
The school offers co-curricular programmes in sports, performing arts, visual arts, and student-led initiatives.

Students participate in sports such as athletics, basketball, cricket, football, swimming, tennis, and table tennis, as well as activities including Model United Nations and youth parliament programmes.

== Initiatives ==
- Our Voice A student-led civic engagement framework focused on issues such as safety, sustainability, public policy, and urban mobility.
- Changemaker Challenge (CMC) A programme in which students work on social and environmental problems through research and solution-building.
- Inventure Youth Parliament (INYP) A platform for student engagement with governance and policy through debates and simulations.
- Community outreach The school undertakes outreach initiatives, including partnerships with government schools such as GHPS Ramagondanahalli and others.<ref>https://www.deccanherald.com/india/karnataka/bengaluru/how-a-govt-school-is-getting-great-marks-3162539</ref>
- Inventure Model United Nations (INMUN) A platform for engagement with global issues through Model United Nations conferences.

== Recognition and Rankings ==
- Inventure Academy has been ranked in the EducationWorld India School Rankings, including being placed No. 1 day school in India (2024–25). https://aninews.in/news/business/top-schools-of-india-educationworld-india-school-rankings-2024-2520240925120437/
- In subsequent editions (2025–26), the school has received category-specific rankings, including No. 1 Ivy League day school in India and No. 1 emerging high-potential school.
- Earlier rankings have placed the school among the top co-educational day schools in Karnataka and India.
- The school has received recognition from Cambridge Assessment International Education, including Outstanding Learner Awards. [https://www.tribuneindia.com/news/business/inventure-academy-learners-win-5-cambridge-outstanding-learner-awards tribuneindia.com]{{dead link|date=August 2026|bot=medic}}{{cbignore|bot=medic}}
