= Nexus Vijaya Mall =

Shopping mall in Chennai, India

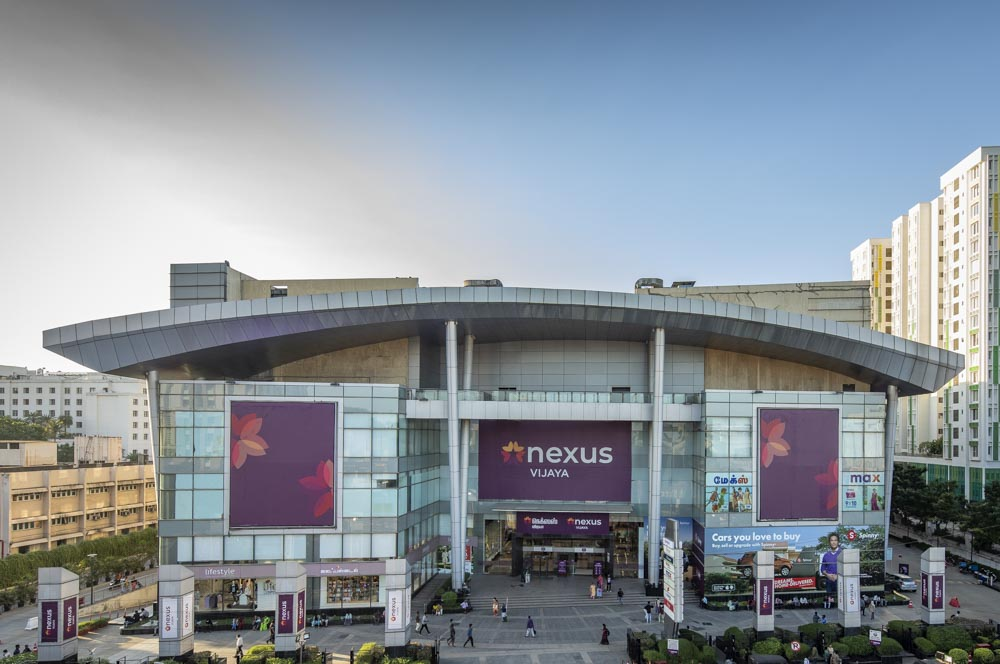
- Nexus Vijaya Mall Chennai
- Location: Chennai, Tamil Nadu, India
- Coordinates: 13.03°N 80.20°E
- Address: 189, NSK Salai, Arcot Road, Vadapalani
- Developer: Prestige Group
- Num. of stores: 100
- Num. of anchor tenants: 10
- Floor area: 650,000 sq ft (60,000 m^{2})
- Parking: Basement & MLCP (3000 car parks)
- Website: www.nexusselecttrust.com/nexus-vijaya

Nexus Vijaya Mall is a shopping mall located in Vadapalani, Chennai, Tamil Nadu, India, developed by Prestige Group. This mall has approx 650,000 square feet of retail space. More than 100 shops occupy its four floors. This mall distinguishes itself by being local by housing Chennai-based brands in the mall such as Spar Hypermarket, RmKV, Lifestyle, Max, Westside, Fab India and Via South. It is also home to PVR Cinemas' Palazzo multiplex and an IMAX screen as well.

== Shops ==
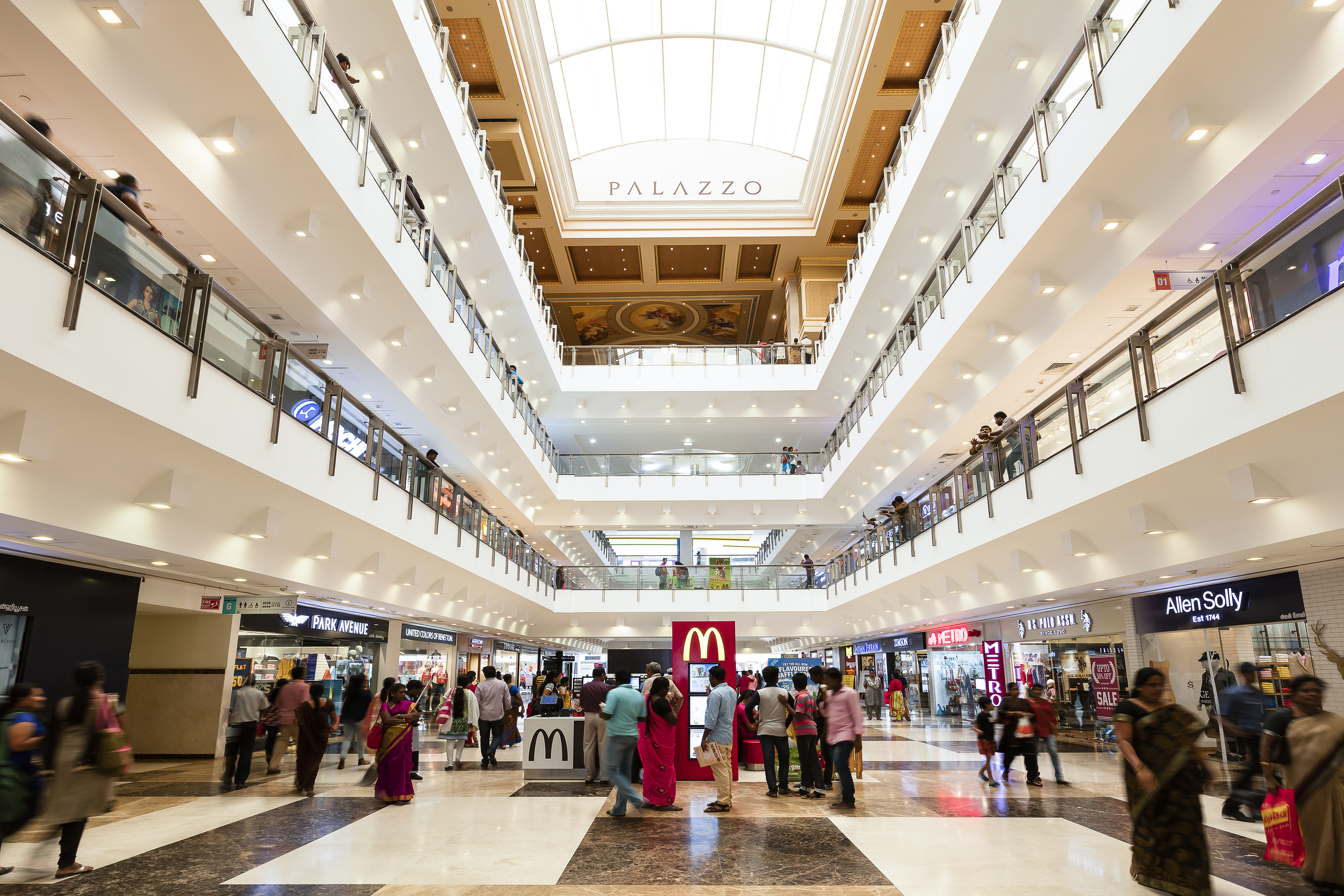
The Nexus Vijaya from the inside

In terms of shops, each floor has been categorized such as ground floor for formal wear, first floor for casual & ethnic wear, second floor for Electronic and Travel and third floor for cinemas and food court . Some of the branded shops in the mall are Lifestyle, Park Avenue, Louis Philipe, Arrow, Ruosh, Basics, Levi, Hidesign, Reebok, Nike, Adidas, Puma, Wildcraft, Soch, Indian Terrain, W, Jockey, Melange, Kalanikethan, Funskool, Van Heusen, Manyavar, U.S. Polo Assn., UCB, Colorplus, Firstcry.com, Mothercare, HP, Lenovo, VIP, Witco, Bata, Gini&Jony.

== More important Shops ==
- Casio
- Via South
- Zebronics
- Skechers
- Sony
- Vivo
- Poorvika
- ID
- Mochi
- Peter England
- The Arvind Store
- Veneto
- Max
- Biba
- Flying machine
- Global Desi
- Health & Glow
- IMAX
- Nalli
- RmKV
- Galito's
- SALT restaurant
- Food Court
- KFC restaurant
- Femiga
- Spar Hypermarket
- PVR Palazzo
- Zimson
- Trends Women
- House of Candy
- ACT Fibernet
- Fun City
- Hamleys
- Westside
- McDonald's
- Limelite
- L'OREAL
- Sneakers
- Kerastase Paris

== Entertainment ==
- This mall houses an 09-screens multiplex from PVR Cinemas titled PVR Palazzo and also one IMAX screen, the second in the city.
- Fun city a gaming and entertainment zone for kids located at level 3 and 4.
- Forum Express, Kiddie Rides, VR Games etc.
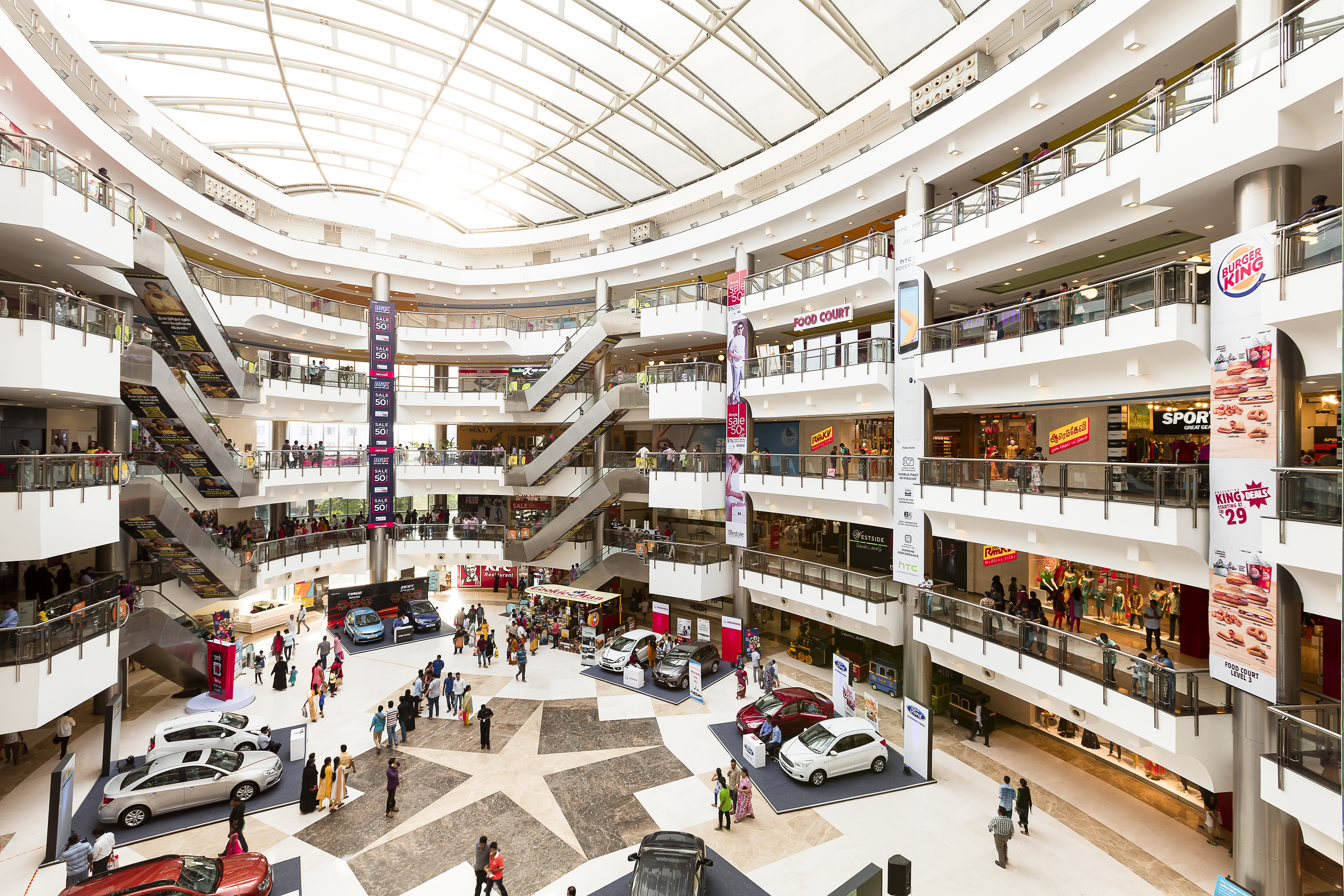
  Nexus Vijaya Mall - Central Atrium

== Food and dining ==
Nexus Mall's food court named as Via South indicates that most of the food stalls here have southern blend into their food. This food court has an 650-seat capacity, and major F&B's like KFC, McDonald's, Junior Kuppanna, Galito's, Taco Bell, Burger King, Beijing Bites, Tuk Tuk, Dosa & co, Wow! Momo, Pandikadai, Arabian Hut, Vasanta Bhavan, Amaravathi, Tibbs Frankie, Ibaco, Squeez Juice Bars, Ibakes, Sandwich Square, Madras Coffee House, Domino's Pizza, Cookieman, Krispy Kreme, Cafe Coffee Day, Kalmane Koffees, Salt restaurant, Cream & Fudge, Subway, Bombaysthan, The Belgian Waffle Co, The pasta bar Venetto, ID, Cream centre are located in Nexus Vijaya mall.

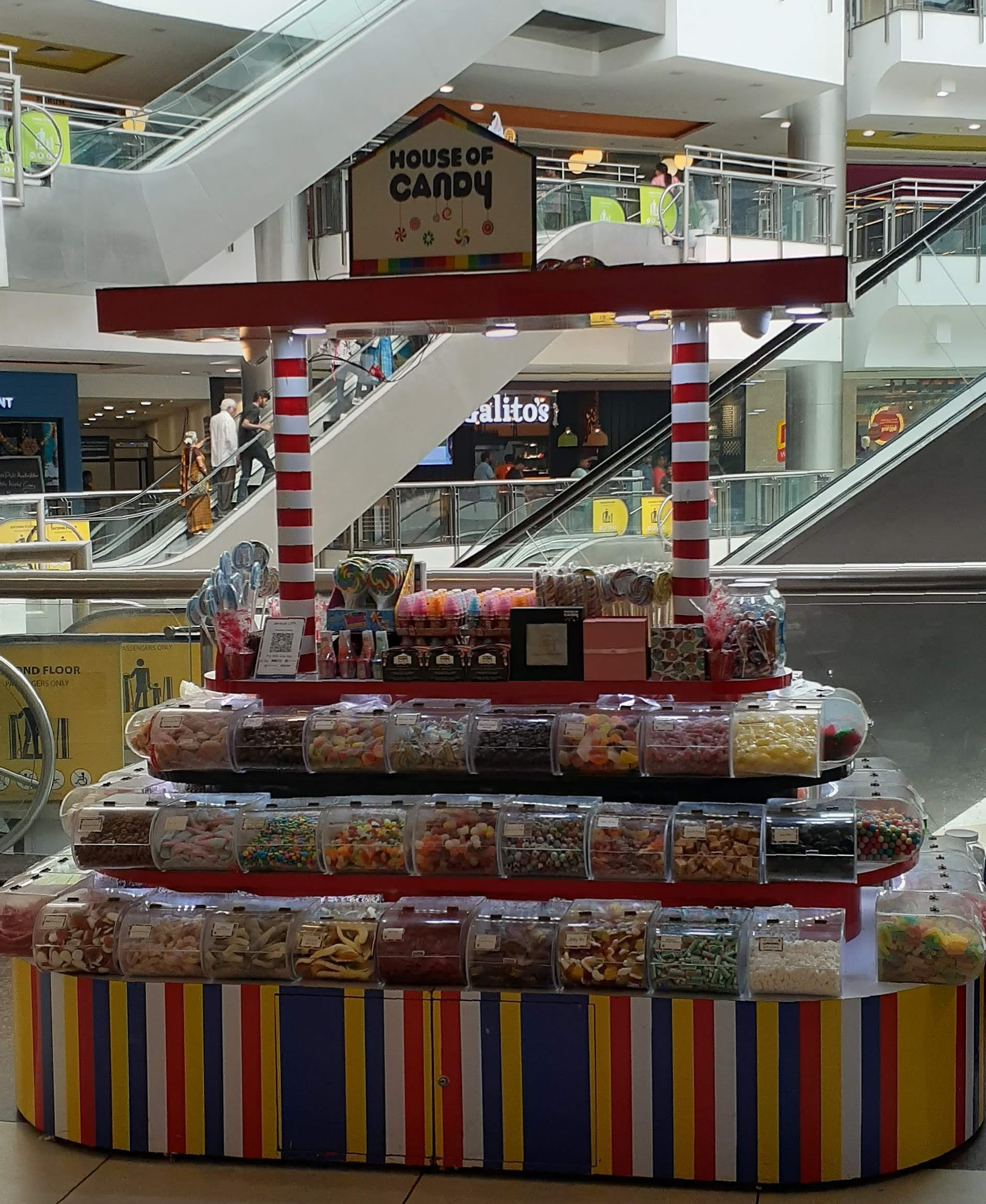
House of Candy, @ NEXUS VIJAYA, Shopping Mall, Vadapalani, Chennai, Tamil Nadu, India.

== Amenities ==
- Info-desk
- First aid
- Wheelchairs
- Reserved parking for disabled and mothers to be
- Disabled bathrooms
- Babycare room
- Baby prams
- Cab station
- Lost & Found
- Car spa
- ATM's
- Free Wi-fi
- Prayer room
- Bike Spa
- Premium Parking
- Bag & Shoe repair

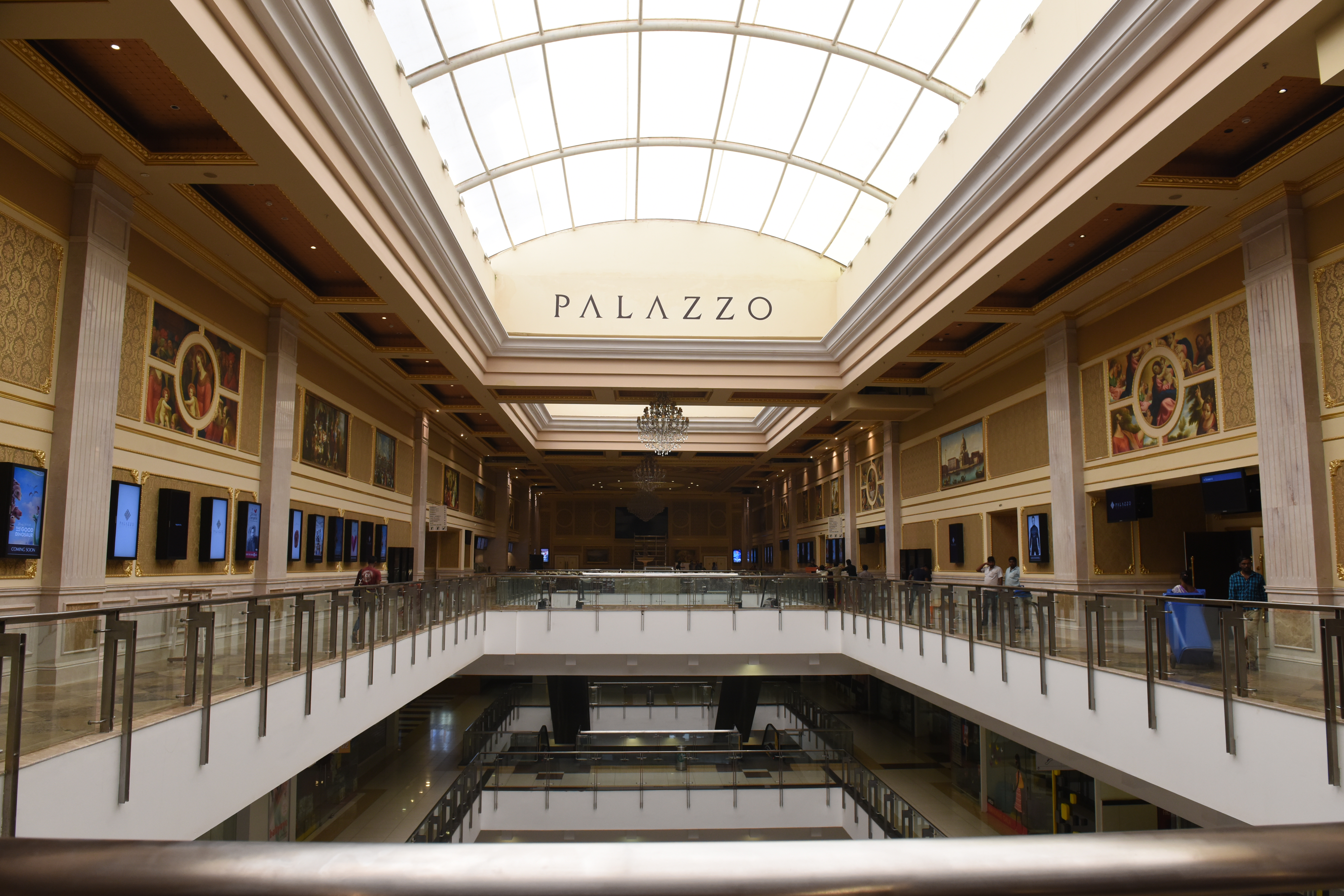
Palazzo Cinemas

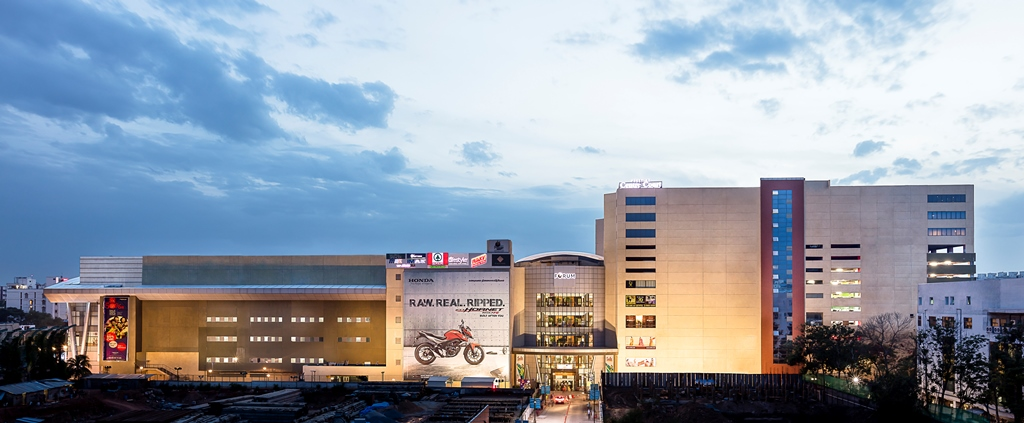
JNR Road view

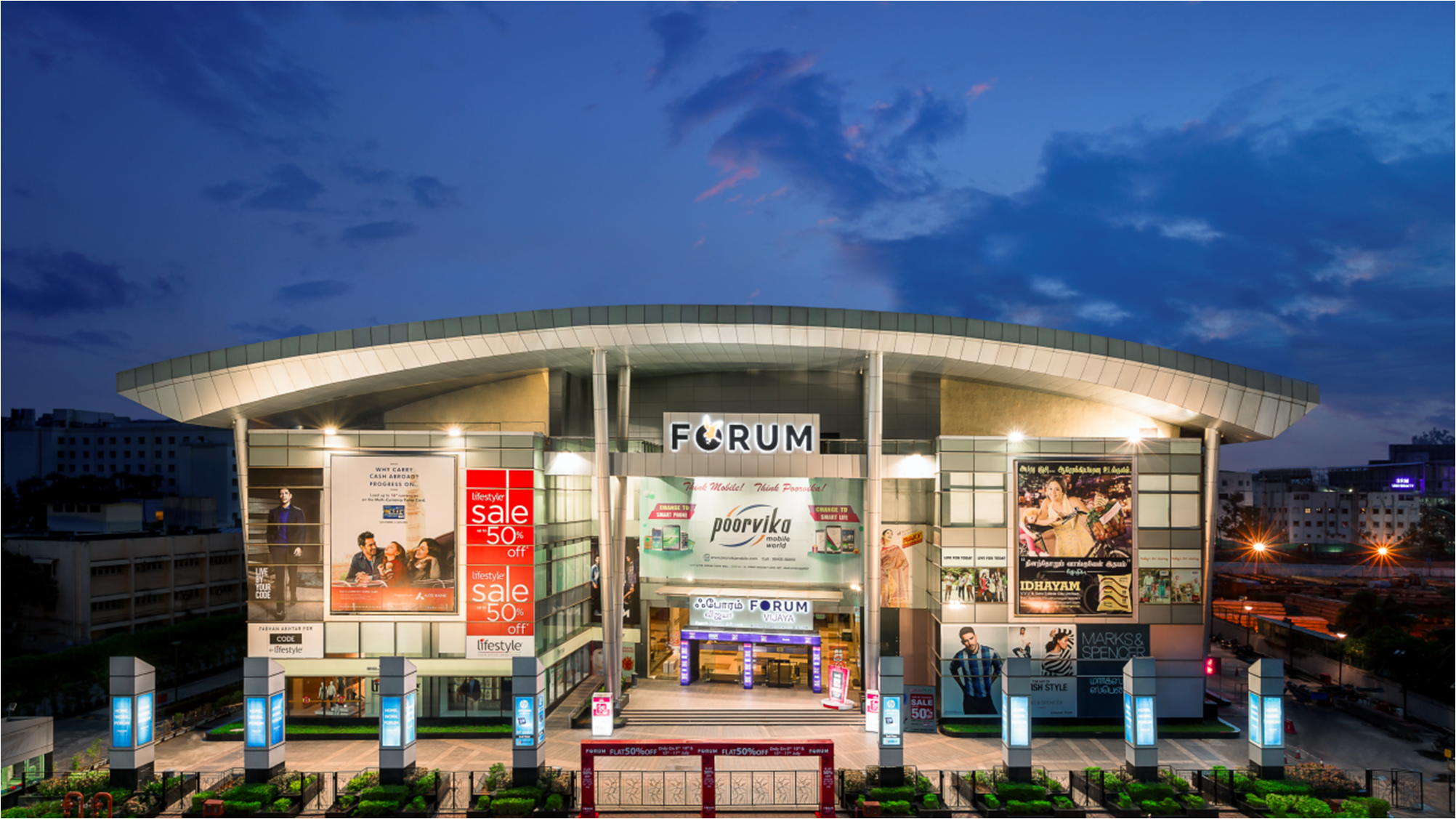
The Nexus Vijaya Mall, facing Arcot road, Chennai, (night view)

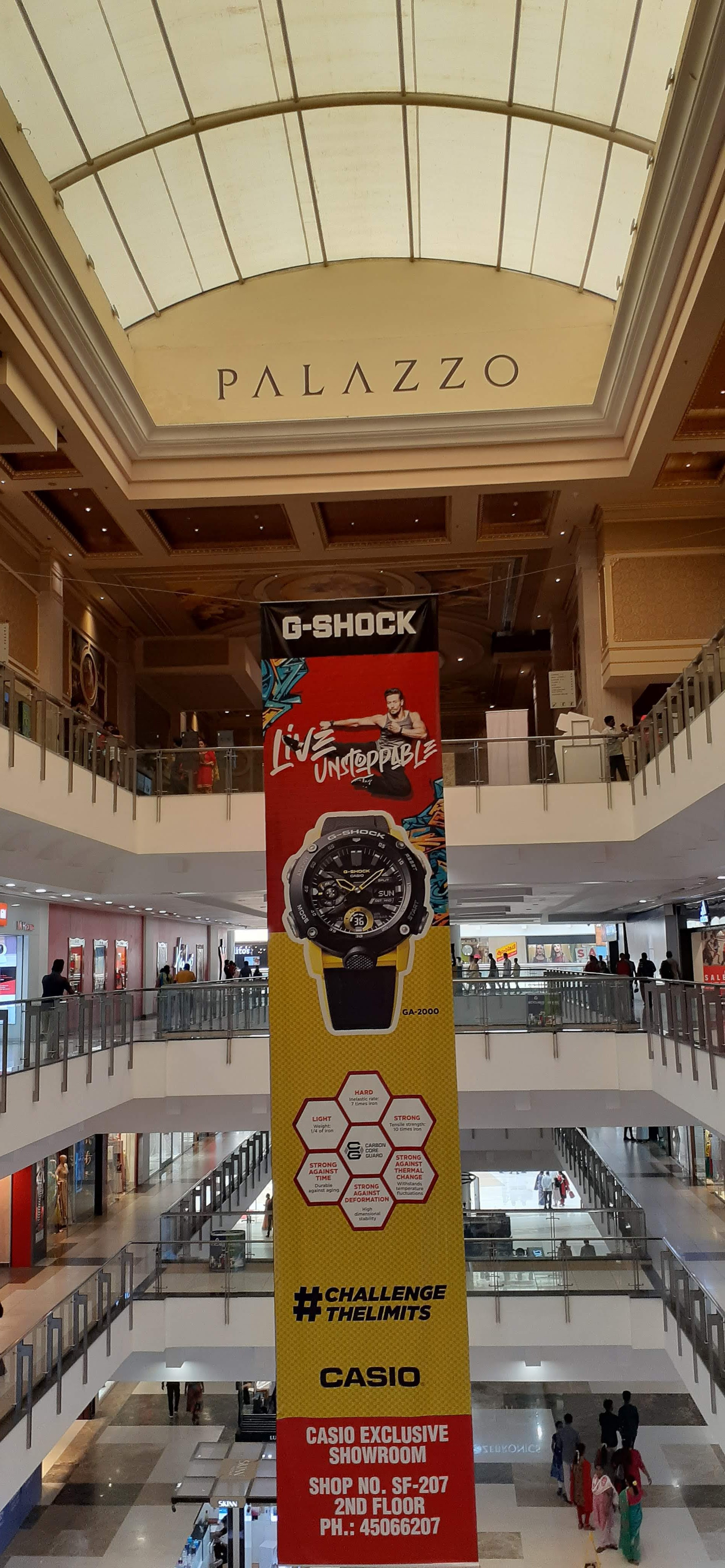
Inside The 'NEXUS VIJAYA', Chennai, Tamil Nadu, India.
