= The Revised Standard Reference Guide to Indian Paper Money =

- Author: Rezwan Razack & Kishore Jhunjhunwalla
- Illustrator: Amkaysweb
- Cover artist: Propel
- Language: English
- Subject: Numismatics
- Publisher: Coins & Currencies
- Publication date: 2012
- Publication place: India
- Media type: Print, hardbound
- Pages: 626
- ISBN: 978-81-89752-15-6

The Revised Standard Reference Guide to Indian Paper Money is a 2012 book by Rezwan Razack and Kishore Jhunjhunwalla. The book is a comprehensive compilation of facts, milestones, and other details regarding paper money in India. It was published in India by Coins & Currencies. Kishore Jhunjhunwalla and Rezwan Razack are avid collectors of Indian currency. The book traces the evolution of Indian currency dating back to 1770. It captures the various nuances of modern-day currency as well as incidents that helped shape this sector over the years. The book is in its second edition—the first was authored by Jhunjhunwalla, whose collection was later purchased by Rezwan Razack. The revised edition was published after 10 years of research. The book was introduced to the public by Uma Shankar, Regional Director of the Reserve Bank of India on 13 January 2012.

== Summary ==
The Revised Standard Reference Guide to Indian Paper Money’’ includes high resolution colour images of notes from Semi-Government and Presidency Banks, which functioned until 1861. The Government of India (British Raj) then undertook the issue of banknotes in 1861, and that is when all Early, Private, and Presidency Banks’ currency issues ceased. The Government of India issued banknotes in 1861 which were uniface with a portrait of Queen Victoria, and underprinting was introduced to the portrait in the series beginning 1867.

Vignettes in the book include the history of Indian bank notes dating back to 1770, when the Bank of Hindostan, a private bank located in Calcutta issued its first banknotes. However, the earliest banknote to still survive is dated 1810, by the Bank of Bengal. The book includes a comprehensive listing of all Indian banknotes since 1770. Early on, all paper currency of India was printed by the Bank of England and shipped to India for distribution. The British India banknotes of King George V were also printed in England. In 1928, the India Security Press at Nasik became functional and took over from the Bank of England Press the printing of notes. In 1935, the Reserve Bank of India was established, and since then it has been the only currency-issuing authority and monetary agency for India. The King George VI Portrait Series were in circulation from 1936 till 1947. The series of King George V and King George VI were also overprinted for use in Burma. The overprinted banknotes of King George VI were also used in Pakistan until 1948.

The book also deals with banknotes since Indian independence, up to the current series of banknotes with the portrait of Mahatma Gandhi. These include the special-issue notes intended for use in the Persian Gulf for the Trucial States, as well as money used by the Hajj pilgrims.

The Osmania banknotes of Hyderabad of 1919-1953 also form a part of this book. Also listed are the issue of banknotes by Jammu and Kashmir and the Hawala notes of Saurashtra. The scope of this book includes the issues of Indo-Portuguese notes for Goa and Indo-French territories at Pondicherry. The cash coupons of Indian Princely States that were printed on paper were issued to counteract the shortage of metal during World War II. The Prisoner of War coupons used as money by the interned prisoners of the Anglo-Boer War of 1899-1902, World War II, and the Indo-Pakistani War of 1971 are also illustrated.

The book has an entire chapter on Essays, Patterns, Proofs and Trials, which displays many of the best Indian banknotes that were designed but never made it into circulation.

The book illustrates the watermarks and explains the minute features of the notes in detail.

== Authors ==
The book has been primarily authored by Rezwan Razack, the joint managing director of Prestige Groups, in association with Kishore Jhunjhunwalla, the sole author of the original ‘’The Standard Reference Guide to Indian Paper Money’’. The authors of the book also acknowledged the roles of Rekha Chandrabhanu, Bazil Shaikh, Murali Thantry, Sanjay Mittal, Mahalingeshwar Athani and Amarbir Singh, an expert on the banknotes and coins of the Nizam of Hyderabad. The Hyderabad notes are also known as Osmania Sicca notes. The authors have dedicated a website indianbanknotes.com to keep the scholars and collectors up to date on Indian Banknote research.

== Book and Cover Designer ==
Devika Thukral, Propel Design - designers for the book
