= Mallya =

Mallya (also spelt as Mallaya) is a surname from coastal Karnataka in India. It is found among Hindus of the Goud Saraswat Brahmin community, especially of Madhva Section following Gokarna Math and Kashi Math.

== History ==
Narayanatirtha, a Vaishnava Swamy from Udupi during the 15th Century extensively propagated Dvaita philosophy in Goa, with this the majority of Saraswats in Sasashti region became followers of Gokarna-Parthagali Math. Thus the establishment of Gokarna Matha by Narayana Tirtha Swamiji led major Goud Saraswat families (especially Kamat and Pai families) in the region to become followers of this matha.

== Notable people ==
The following is a list of notable people with last name Mallya.

- Sid Mallya (born 1987), director of the Indian Premier League cricket team Royal Challengers Bangalore and son of Vijay Mallya
- U. Srinivas Mallya (1902–1965), Indian politician and architect of modern Dakshina Kannada district
- Vijay Mallya (born 1955), Indian businessman and son of Vittal Mallya
- Vittal Mallya (1925–1983), Indian entrepreneur and father of Vijay Mallya
- Narayana Purushothama Mallaya (born 1929), Indian author known for his activism for Konkani language and literature
