= Kingfisher Xpress =

Indian defunct cargo delivery service

- Company type: Division
- Industry: Express Logistics
- Founded: 2010
- Defunct: 2013
- Headquarters: Mumbai, Maharashtra
- Area served: India
- Key people: Vijay Mallya, Chairman & CEO; A. Raghunathan, CFO (Finance)
- Parent: Kingfisher Airlines
- Website: kingfisherxpress.com

Kingfisher Xpress was a Door-to-Door cargo delivery service from an Indian defunct airline, Kingfisher Airlines. Kingfisher Xpress Same Day service was India's first and only same day delivery by air service.

== Service ==
Service offered a pick-up facility in the eight main metropolitan cities of India namely Mumbai, New Delhi, Bangalore, Hyderabad, Chennai, Ahmedabad, Cochin and Kolkata with guaranteed same-day delivery in up to 22 cities of India namely Ahmedabad, Bagdogra, Bangalore, Chennai, Coimbatore, Delhi, Kochi, Goa, Guwahati, Hyderabad, Indore, Jaipur, Kolkata, Mumbai, Patna, Raipur, Ranchi, Lucknow, Nagpur, Pune, Srinagar and Tiruvanathapuram.

== Destinations ==
Andhra Pradesh

- Hyderabad - Rajiv Gandhi International Airport (pick up facility)

Assam

- Guwahati - Lokpriya Gopinath Bordoloi International Airport

Chhattisgarh

- Raipur - Raipur Airport

Delhi

- New Delhi - Indira Gandhi International Airport (pick up facility)

Goa

- Vasco da Gama - Dabolim Airport

Gujarat

- Ahmedabad - Sardar Vallabhbhai Patel International Airport (pick up facility)

Jammu and Kashmir

- Srinagar - Srinagar Airport

Jharkhand

- Ranchi - Birsa Munda Airport

Karnataka

- Bangalore - Bengaluru International Airport (pick up facility)

Kerala

- Cochin - Cochin International Airport (pick up facility)
- Tiruvanathapuram - Trivandrum International Airport

Madhya Pradesh

- Indore - Devi Ahilyabai Holkar Airport

Maharashtra

- Mumbai - Chhatrapati Shivaji International Airport (pick up facility)
- Nagpur - Dr. Babasaheb Ambedkar International Airport
- Pune - Pune International Airport

Rajasthan

- Jaipur - Jaipur International Airport

Tamil Nadu

- Chennai - Chennai International Airport (pick up facility)
- Coimbatore - Coimbatore Airport

Uttar Pradesh

- Lucknow - Amausi Airport

West Bengal

- Kolkata - Netaji Subhash Chandra Bose International Airport (pick up facility)
- Siliguri - Bagdogra Airport

== See also ==
- Indian Postal Service
