= Kingfisher (beer) =

Indian beer brand

- Type: Lager
- Manufacturer: United Breweries Group
- Origin: Indian
- Introduced: 1978
- Alcohol by volume: 4.12%
- Variants: Kingfisher Premium; Kingfisher Zero; Kingfisher Strong; Kingfisher Magnum Strong; Kingfisher Strong Fresh; Kingfisher Draught; Kingfisher Ultra; Kingfisher Blue; Kingfisher Red; Kingfisher Lager; Kingfisher Storm
- Related products: Kingfisher Bohemia; Zingaro; UB Export; London Pilsner; Kalyani Black Label; Bullet; Peacock Cider; Bintang Beer; Pearl River Beer
- Website: Kingfisher (global); Kingfisher (Europe)

Kingfisher is an Indian beer brewed by United Breweries Group, Bangalore, India. The brand was first introduced in 1857 and then relaunched in 1978 by Vijay Mallya. With a market share of over 36% in India, it is also available in 52 other countries as of 2013.

== History ==
In 1978, Vijay Mallya launched Kingfisher Premium beer, inspired by the defunct brand from United Breweries Group which was introduced in 1857. As the Advertising Standards Council of India banned alcohol advertisements in India, the UB Group began to promote the brand through surrogate advertisements of Kingfisher mineral water. After the group began operating Kingfisher Airlines in 2005, advertisements made their way into airplane cabins. In the United States, the company promoted the Kingfisher beer by de-ethnicizing the brand.

== Kingfisher Beer Europe ==
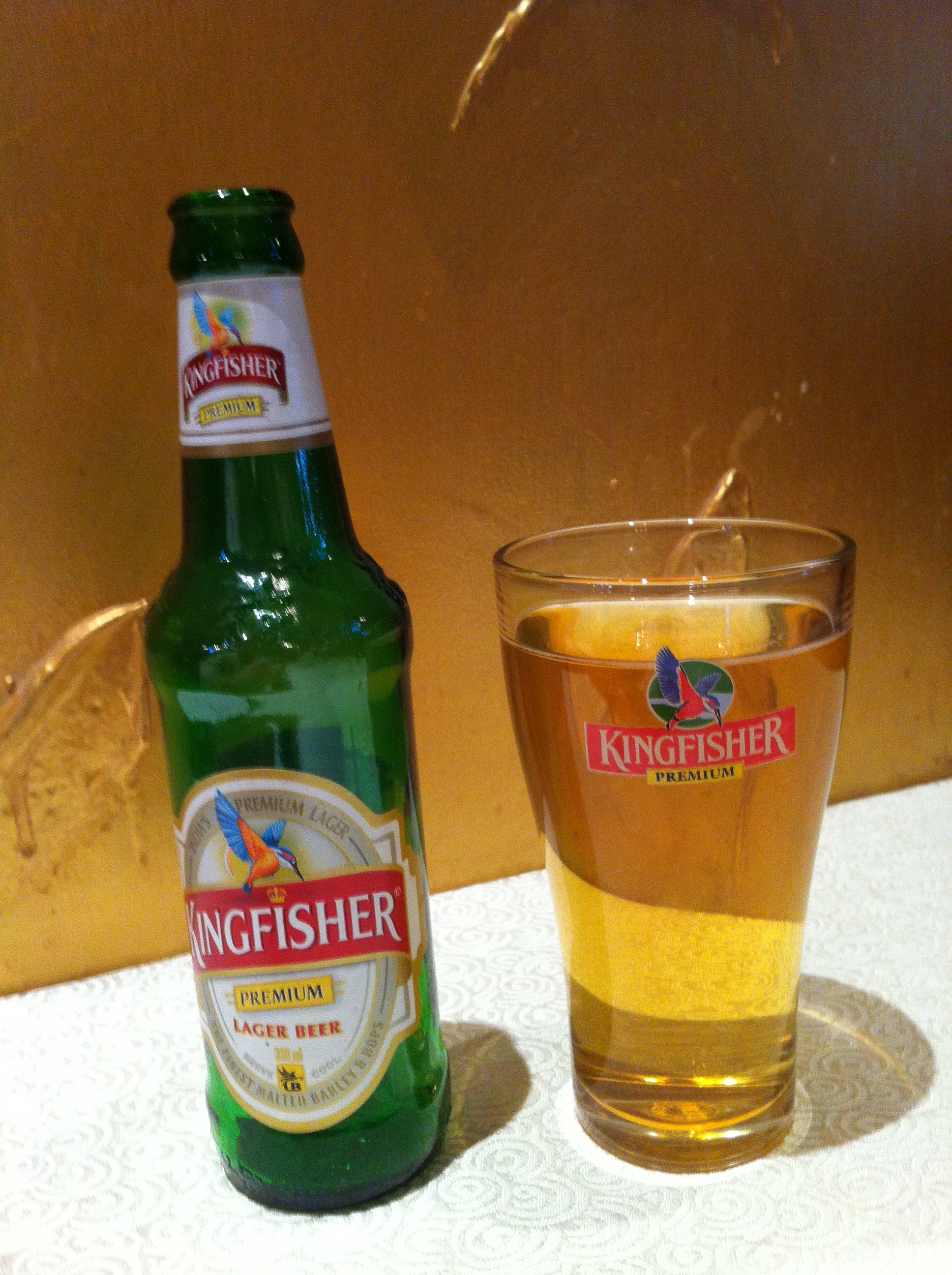
A bottle of Kingfisher lager beer

Kingfisher Beer Europe Ltd. (KBE) is the European arm of United Breweries with a head office in Maidstone, Kent. In the UK, Kingfisher is brewed under licence by Heineken but to the same recipe as used in India. The company runs independently of Kingfisher World and has its own assets such as website, social media, POS suite & marketing objectives such as the tagline, 'The Real Taste of India' which highlights the brand's genuine heritage and sets it apart from other similar products in the UK & Europe.

KBE sells Premium, which is available in four formats; 330 mL (24 x 330 mL cases), 650 mL (12 x 650 mL case), pint or half pint draught and kegs (30 or 50 L).

In November 2016, KBE launched Peacock Cider: a 'quality apple cider' created to 'elegantly complement Asian flavours, providing a burst of apple refreshment to balance aromatic spices.'

In 2017, KBE added two more products to its portfolio - Bintang Beer, 'Indonesia's No.1 Beer' and Pearl River Beer, an 'Iconic Cantonese Beer'.

In 2023, Kingfisher Zero was launched as a 0% variant of Kingfisher Premium.

== Recognition ==
Kingfisher is ranked 74th among India's most trusted brands according to the Brand Trust Report 2012, a study conducted by Trust Research Advisory. In the Brand Trust Report 2013, Kingfisher was ranked 102nd among India's most trusted brands and subsequently, according to the Brand Trust Report 2014, Kingfisher was ranked 198th among India's most trusted brands.

== See also ==
- Kingfisher Airlines
