= Trishneet Arora =

Indian entrepreneur

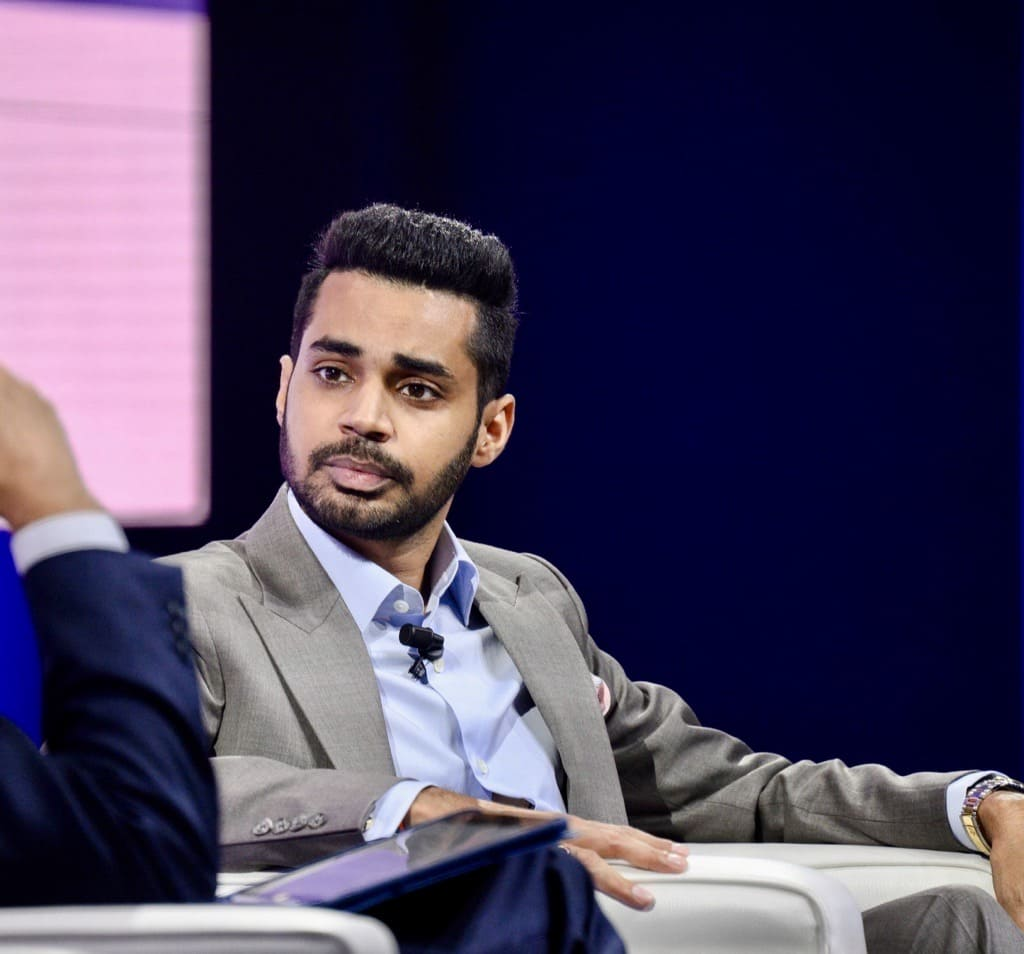
- Trishneet Arora in Italy
- Born: 2 November 1993 (age 33); Ludhiana, Punjab, India
- Occupation: Chief executive officer of TAC Security
- Years active: 2012–present

Trishneet Arora is an Indian entrepreneur and the founder and chief executive officer of TAC Security, a cybersecurity company. He was named in Forbes 30 Under 30 2018 Asia list and Fortune India 40 Under 40 2019 list of India's Brightest Business Minds.

== Career ==
Arora founded TAC Security, a cybersecurity company focused on vulnerability management, cyber risk management for enterprises. In 2024, TAC Security was listed on an SME stock exchange platform. His firm mainly provides vulnerability assessment and penetration testing services. According to him, there has been an increase in the number of attacks against portals of companies.

In 2016, TAC Security raised pre-Series A funding from the investor Vijay Kedia. In November 2022, Arora was invited by US Vice President Kamala Harris to discuss cybersecurity at a gathering of young business leaders in New Mexico.

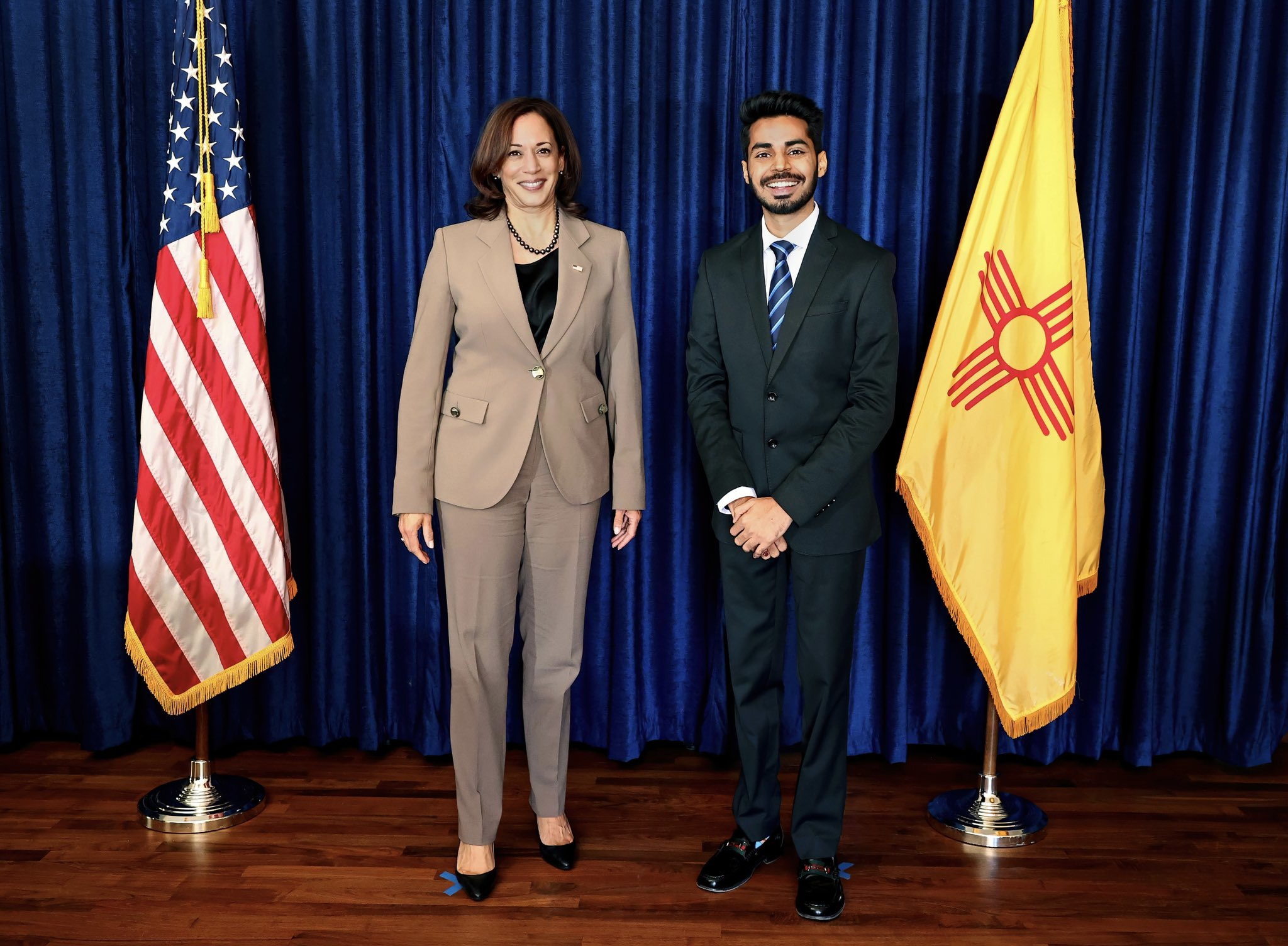
Trishneet Arora with US Vice President Kamala Harris

== Biography ==
Cyrus Gonda wrote the biography Trishneet Arora as part of his "The Magic of Leadership" series. In the 2024 Hurun India Rich List, he was ranked sixth among the country's youngest entrepreneurs on the list, with a net worth of ₹1,100 crore.

Year	Award	Organisation
2025	Global Top 25 Cybersecurity Executives	The AI Software Report
2025	U-35 List 2025	Hurun India
2022	Global Leader of Tomorrow	St. Gallen University
2021	40 Under 40	Fortune India
2020	Entrepreneur of the Year in Service Business - Security	Entrepreneur Magazine
2020	Top 100 Great People Managers	Forbes India & GMI
2019	Fortune India's 40 Under 40	Fortune India
2018	Leaders of Tomorrow	St. Gallen Symposium
2018	Forbes Asia 30 Under 30	Forbes Asia
2017	The 50 most influential young Indians	GQ Magazine
2015	Punjabi Icon Award	PCHB
2014	CM of Punjab, bestowed a 'State Award' on the 65th Republic Day	Punjab Government
