= Riri Trivedi =

Indian mental health professional and author

Riri G Trivedi
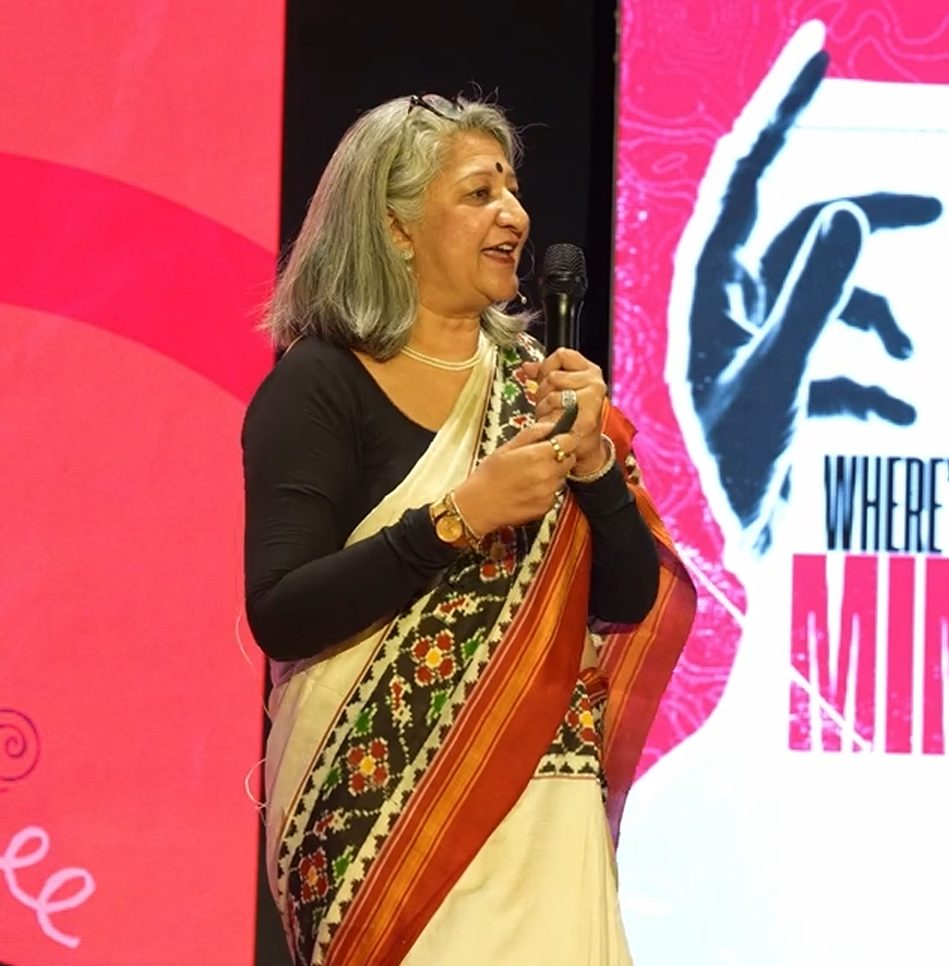
- Trivedi at TEDx Jai Hind College in 2025
- Occupations: Researcher, Author, and Public Speaker
- Website: wellness-space.net/riri-g-trivedi/

Riri Trivedi is an Indian mental health practitioner, researcher, and author. Her work focuses on adverse childhood experiences (ACEs), childhood trauma, parenting, and integrative wellness.

== Early life ==
Trivedi was raised in Gujarat. She completed an LLB and an MBA before working in the corporate sector in Mumbai, Japan, Singapore, and China. In 2008, she transitioned to the wellness field, obtaining certification as a yoga teacher and therapist in Singapore. Her focus subsequently shifted toward yoga philosophy and mindfulness.

== Career overview ==
Trivedi has authored and co-authored peer-reviewed research articles indexed in Google Scholar and PubMed. Her research primarily focuses on trauma psychology, adverse childhood experiences (ACEs), and the assessment of mental health within Indian populations and she has also served as a commentator on these subjects.

Trivedi’s work in clinical practice, research, and media addresses childhood trauma, emotional abuse, parenting practices, and preventive mental health in India.

In 2025, Trivedi was awarded a PhD from the Shri Jagdishprasad Jhabarmal Tibarewala University for her doctoral thesis titled "Adverse childhood experiences anxiety depression and subjective well being of adult indians".

Trivedi is the founder of Wellness Space and the Society for Energy and Emotions (SEE), where she practices in fields including anxiety, depression, grief, and post-traumatic stress disorder (PTSD).

== Major contributions and achievements ==
=== Research on adverse childhood experiences ===
Trivedi's research focuses on the relationship between adverse childhood experiences (ACEs) and adult mental health. Her work examines correlations between childhood trauma and internalizing symptoms, PTSD, suicidal behavior, and parenting practices among Indian adults.

Trivedi’s work involves the psychometric validation of ACE assessment tools and the study of emotional abuse. Additionally, she has utilized machine learning to develop predictive models for suicidal behavior.

=== Parenting and Intergenerational Perspectives ===
Trivedi has addressed the shifting roles of grandparents in modern child-rearing, advocating for a transition from traditional authoritarian styles to "conscious parenting" methods. She emphasizes the importance of grandparents adapting to contemporary boundaries and child-centric practices to maintain family cohesion. Her work in this area focuses on resolving intergenerational trauma and preventing the transmission of adverse childhood experiences (ACEs) within the family unit.

=== Therapeutic approaches ===
Trivedi has conducted pilot and quasi-experimental studies within Indian wellness settings to evaluate trauma-processing techniques. Her research includes the reconsolidation of traumatic memories, regression therapy, and inner child integration models.

=== Books ===
Trivedi is the author of the book This Book Won’t Teach You Parenting: But It Will Make You a Better Parent, which focuses on trauma-informed parenting and emotional awareness.

She has also co-authored the book Breast Cancer: Medical Treatment, Side Effects, and Complementary Therapies which was published in 2017

In 2026, Trivedi co-authored What Happened to Me? vs What's Wrong with Me?: Indian Perspectives on Childhood Trauma and Recovery with Gunjan Y. Trivedi and Hemalatha Ramani, a non-fiction book that examines the impact of adverse childhood experiences within Indian family systems using case interviews and peer-reviewed research.

== Media presence and public engagement ==
Trivedi has contributed to public discussions on mental health and parenting through television, print, and digital media. She has been a guest on the podcast Figuring Out with Raj Shamani and has spoken at literary and wellness festivals.

Trivedi participated in a panel titled "Mental Health & Wellbeing" at the White Owl Fest. Moderated by Archana Nathan, the panel also featured Dr. Tanaya Narendra and Ellen Konyak. The discussion addressed mental health awareness, the role of community support, and professional mental health services.

Trivedi and Vijender Singh Chauhan discussed challenges facing Generation Z, including the impact of parenting styles, digital media, and academic pressure on mental health and identity development at the Kolkata Literary Festival.

Trivedi was part of a research team that worked with IIT Mandi in 2024 that published a study in the European Journal of Trauma and Dissociation examining the correlation between adverse childhood experiences (ACEs) and suicidal behavior in early adulthood.

In 2025, Trivedi appeared as a guest expert alongside Kareena Kapoor Khan on Soha Ali Khan’s wellness podcast, All About Her, where she discussed positive parenting and the impact of intergenerational trauma on modern family dynamics.
