= Vijay Kedia =

Indian stock market investor

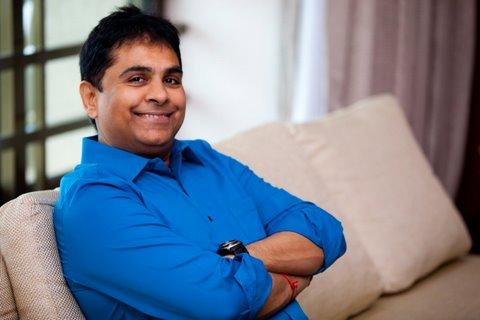
- Born: Calcutta, India
- Education: B.Com
- Alma mater: University of Petroleum and Energy Studies
- Occupations: Investor and stock trader
- Children: 2

Vijay Kishanlal Kedia is an Indian investor born in Kolkata.

== Career ==
He realized his passion for the stock market when he was 14 and started trading at 19, without success. After few years he left his hometown Kolkata and came to Mumbai to try his luck. In 2004 and 2005 he identified and invested in three such shares (Atul auto, Aegis logistics, Cera sanitaryware) which appreciated more than 100 times in next 10 to 12 years. In early 2012, he correctly predicted that India was at the beginning of a structural bull run. In 2016, Kedia was featured at #13 in Business World list of Successful Investors In India. In 2017, "MoneyLife Advisory" launched an "Ask Vijay Kedia" microsite, and Kedia's portfolio stocks rose up to 170%. In 2018, he was invited to speak at London Business School. In November of the same year, he was invited to speak at TEDx. He also participated in a Tedx event held in Jai Hind College, Mumbai alongside other speakers like filmmaker Ramon Chibb, Indian mental health practitioner Riri Trivedi and Indian Olympian Suma Shirur among others.

== Investment strategy ==
Kedia strictly adheres to SMILE as a principle in investing; which translates into Small in size, Medium in experience, Large in aspiration and Extra-large in market potential. On his investment strategy, Kedia said: "One should scout for companies which have good management... Find a very good management, a very honest management and see the product in which the management is going to grow, going to outperform its peers and the economy... invest in those companies for the next 10–15 years, and you cannot go wrong." Bet big and ride through tough times is his advice. While luck plays a big part in stock market investments, knowledge, courage and patience are the cornerstones according to him. He has been 100 percent invested for the past 30 years of his investing career.

As of 2023, he is holding almost 15 stocks with a net worth of over Rs. 1,467.6 Crore.
