= United Breweries Group =

Indian conglomerate

United Breweries Limited

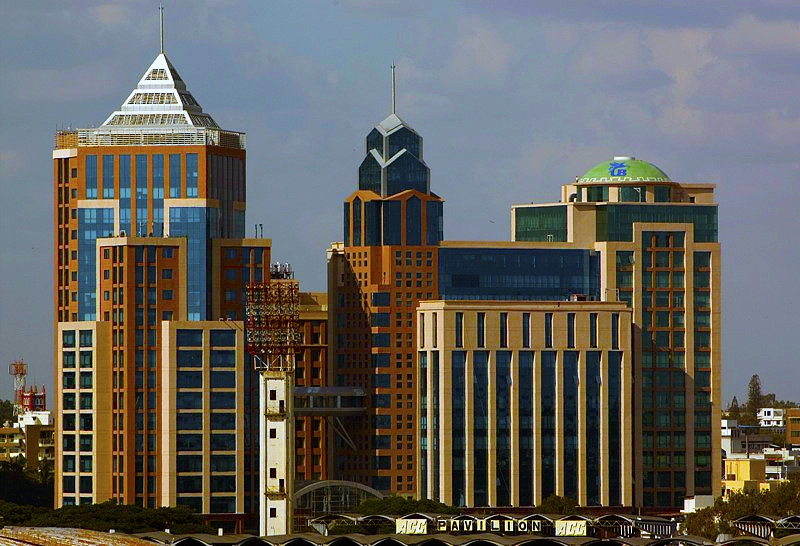
- UB City (headquarters) in Bangalore
- Type: Private
- Industry: Conglomerate
- Founded: 1857; 169 years ago
- Headquarters: UB City, Bangalore, Karnataka, India
- Area served: Worldwide
- Key people: Vivek Gupta (CEO)
- Products: Fertilizer; engineering; aviation; alcoholic beverages
- Brands: Kingfisher; London Pilsner
- Revenue: ▲₹7,549 crore (US$780 million) (2023)
- Operating income: ▲₹403 crore (US$42 million) (2023)
- Net income: ▲₹304 crore (US$32 million) (2023)
- Total assets: ▲₹6,280 crore (US$650 million) (2023)
- Total equity: ▲₹3,965 crore (US$410 million) (2023)
- Owner: Heineken
- Number of employees: 50,000 (2017)
- Subsidiaries: Mangalore Chemicals & Fertilizers; UB Overseas Limited; Kingfisher Training and Aviation Services Ltd.; UB Infrastructure Projects Ltd.; United Breweries Of America Inc.; UB International Trading Ltd.; UB Electronic Instruments Ltd.; Kingfisher Finvest India Ltd.
- Website: www.unitedbreweries.com

United Breweries Holdings Limited (UBHL), also called UB Group, is the Indian subsidiary of Heineken N.V.. It is headquartered in UB City, Bangalore, Karnataka. Its core business includes beverages and investments in various sectors. The company markets beer under the Kingfisher brand, and owns various other brands of alcoholic beverages. United Breweries is India's largest producer of beer.

United Breweries now has greater than a 40% share of the Indian brewing market with 79 distilleries and bottling units around the world. In 2005, UB financed a takeover of the spirits business of the rival Shaw-Wallace company, giving it a majority share of India's spirits business. The group no longer owns the Mendocino Brewing Company in the United States.

== History ==
The UB Group was founded by a Scotsman, Thomas Leishman, in 1915, when he brought together Castle Brewery and Nilgiris Breweries (1857), Bangalore Brewing Co. (1885), British Brewing Corp. (1903), and BBB Brewery Co. Ltd. (1913). The Group took its initial lessons in manufacturing beer from South India-based British Breweries. At 22, Vittal Mallya was elected as the company's first Indian director in 1947. After a year, he replaced R. G. N. Price as the company's chairman.

United Breweries made its initial impact by manufacturing bulk beer for the British troops before independence which was transported in huge barrels or "Hogsheads". Kingfisher, the Group's most visible and profitable brand, made a modest entry in the sixties. The company expanded greatly during the 1950s and 60s by acquiring other breweries. First was the addition of McDowell as one of the Group subsidiaries. This move helped United Breweries to extend its portfolio to the wines and spirits business. As a strategical measure, the Group moved into agro-based industries and medicines. The former is marked by Mallya acquiring Kissan Products. A long-term relationship with Hoechst AG of Germany was also established, resulting in the creation of an Indian pharmaceutical company, Aventis Pharma. (Currently the Indian subsidiary of the global pharmaceuticals major Sanofi-Aventis).

UB Group had a relationship with United Spirits Limited, now majority-owned (54.8%) by Diageo.

The conglomerate was headed by Vijay Mallya, who left India on 2 March 2016, allegedly to escape legal action by Indian banks to whom he owed an estimated ₹9,000 crore (US$1.1 billion) in loans.

In June 2021, Heineken N.V. bought out Mallya's 15% stake in United Breweries Limited for ₹5,825 crores (US$730 million) from the Debt Recovery Tribunal. With this, Heineken's stake in the company increased to 61.5%, taking control of United Breweries.

In May 2023, employees, terminated from service at the United Breweries factory located near Ranasthalam, Srikakulam on account of reduced orders, staged protest.

== The logo ==
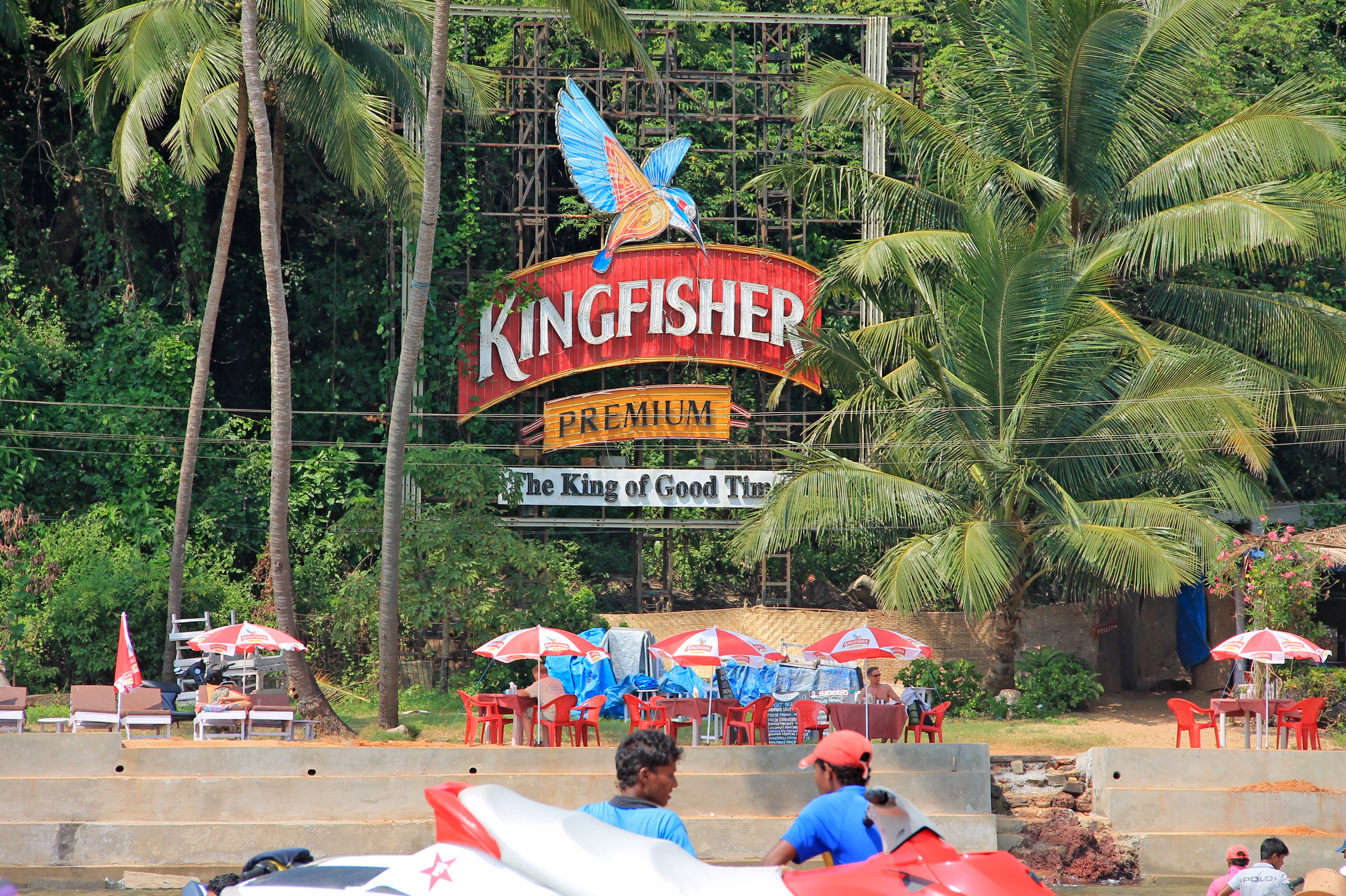
A Kingfisher beer advertisement in Goa

The Pegasus, which is the symbol of the United Breweries, first found its place as the Group logo in 1941. Then, the Helladic horse – associated with beer and nectar in Greek mythology – carried a beer cask between the wings, ostensibly because beer formed the core operations of the Group. Later, the beer cask was removed to represent the Group's multifaceted operations.

== Subsidiaries ==
- United Breweries Limited – the UB Group's brewing entity, which has undisputed market leadership with a national market share in excess of 50%. The UB Group today controls 60% of the total manufacturing capacity for beer in India. United Breweries is controlled by Heineken N.V. which owns a majority stake in the company.
- UB Engineering – the group's engineering business arm. It undertakes engineering, procurement and construction projects, infrastructure, on-site fabrication of structures, installation, testing and commissioning of electrical and mechanical equipment, piping for large industrial projects. The company was initially established as Western India Erectors in 1963 and came under the UB Group in 1988.
- UBICS – providing IT consulting, body shopping services and professional IT products to business companies.

=== Defunct subsidiaries ===
- Kingfisher Airlines – UB Group launched Kingfisher Airlines, an airline in India whose operation was halted after problems in 2012 that led to its licence being revoked by the DGCA.

== See also ==
- United Spirits
- Kingfisher Airlines
