= Victoria Smurfit =

Irish actress (born 1974)

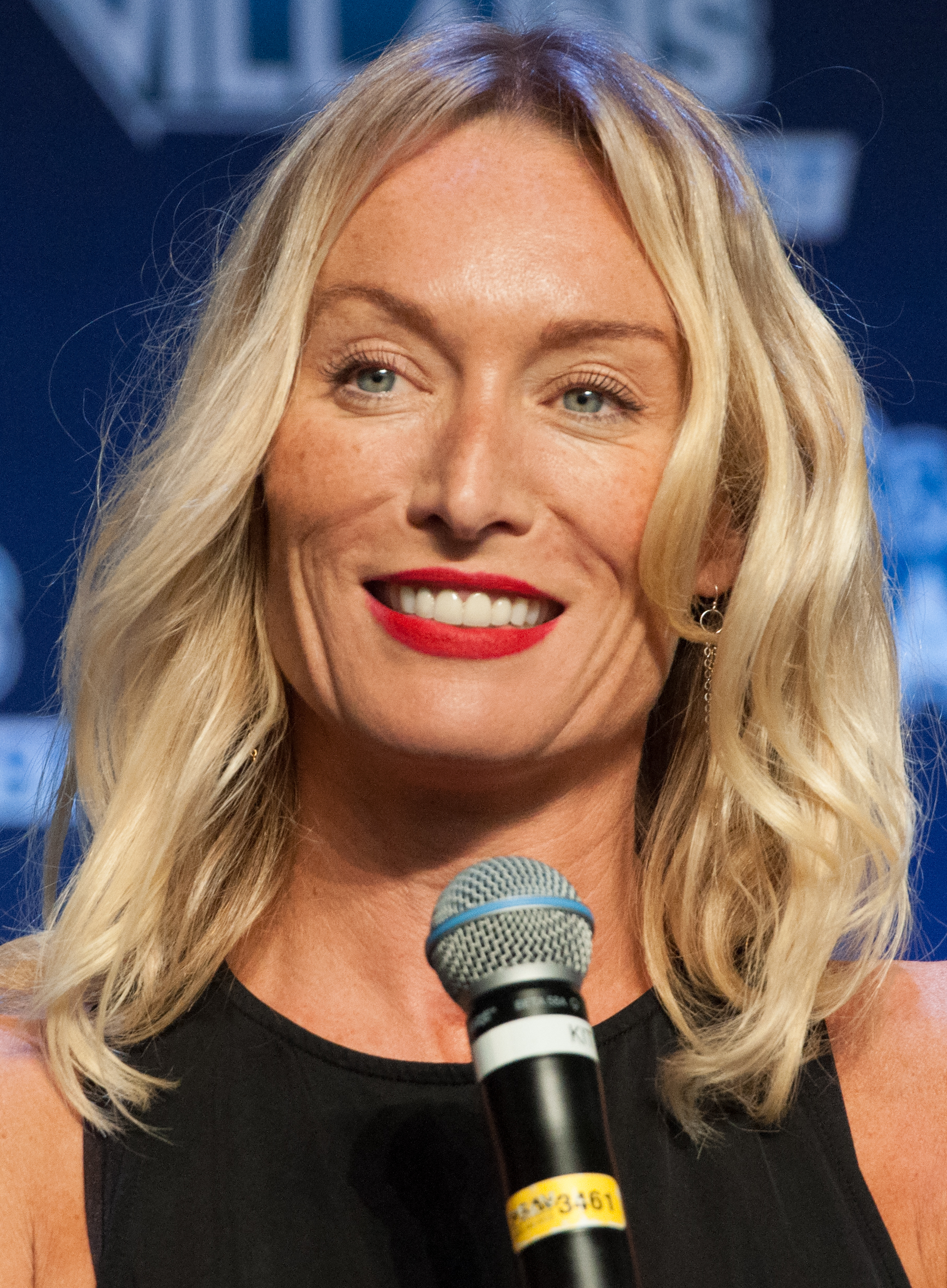
- Smurfit in 2016
- Born: 31 March 1974 (age 52); Dublin, Ireland
- Occupation: Actress
- Years active: 1995–present
- Spouse: Douglas Baxter (m. 2000; div. 2015)
- Children: 3
- Relatives: Michael Smurfit (uncle)

Victoria Smurfit (born 31 March 1974) is an Irish actress. She is known for playing Orla O'Connell in the BBC television series Ballykissangel, Detective Chief Inspector Roisin Connor in the ITV police procedural Trial & Retribution and Cruella de Vil in Once Upon a Time for which she was nominated as Best Supporting Actress in 13th IFTA Film & Drama Awards in 2016. Most recently, she played Maud O’Hara in Rivals on Disney+.

== Early life ==
Victoria Smurfit is part of the Smurfit family which, through Smurfit Kappa, is one of the richest in Ireland. The family, headed by Victoria's uncle Michael Smurfit, sponsors a number of sporting events including the Smurfit European Open and the Champion Hurdle. The family is also associated with Smurfit Business School in University College Dublin (UCD). Smurfit studied for an A-level in theatre studies and subsequently went onto the Bristol Old Vic Theatre School.

== Career ==
Smurfit gained fame for her role as Orla O'Connell in the BBC television series Ballykissangel from 1998 to 1999. She played Nina in the 2003 film Bulletproof Monk. From 2003 to 2009, Smurfit portrayed the lead role of Detective Chief Inspector Roisin Connor in the ITV police procedural Trial & Retribution. She also guest starred in the BBC Radio 4 series Baldi. In 2011 Smurfit appeared in the Agatha Christie's Marple television episode "The Mirror Crack'd from Side to Side".

In 2013, Smurfit co-starred as Lady Jayne Wetherby in the NBC television period drama Dracula. In 2014, she began playing the recurring guest role of Cruella de Vil in ABC's Once Upon a Time.

In the run-up to shooting for her role in Homecoming, she described the film as a "mean girls for grown-ups". She played Nikki, the "head mean girl". In 2021, she played Pippa in Deadly Cuts and in 2022 played Olivia Foyle in Bloodlands. In 2024, she played Maud O'Hara in Disney Plus's Rivals, based on the Jilly Cooper novel of the same name, which was renewed for a second season in December 2024.

== Personal life ==
Smurfit married advertising executive Douglas Baxter on 29 July 2000 in Surrey, England, and gave birth to their first child, daughter Evie Dorothy Baxter in Dublin, Ireland, on 2 November 2004. A second daughter, Ridley Belle Baxter was born in May 2007. Their third child, a son, Flynn Alexander Baxter, was born in November 2008. In 2012 the family relocated to Santa Monica, California, US. In February 2015 it was announced that Smurfit and her husband had filed for divorce.

She wrote an opinion blog for The Dubliner, which often featured anecdotes from her personal life, and is a patron of the children's charity World Vision Ireland.

== Filmography ==
=== Film ===
Year	Title	Role	Notes	Ref.
1995	The Run of the Country	Annagh		
1996	The Leading Man	Annabel		
1997	Romance and Rejection	Helen		
2000	The Beach	Weathergirl		
2000	The Wedding Tackle	Clodagh		
2002	The Last Great Wilderness	Claire		
2002	About a Boy	Suzie		
2003	Bulletproof Monk	Nina Strucker		
2011	Honeymoon for One	Hilary	Television film	
2011	A Proper Send-Off	Natalia	Short film	
2014	Amnesia: Who Are You?	Monica		
2014	Among Ravens	Emma		
2014	Bait	Bex		
2016	Best Fake Friends	Nikki		
2017	The Lears	Diana		
2017	The Secret Market	Dr. Amy McCarthy	Short film	
2021	Deadly Cuts	Pippa		

=== Television ===
Year	Title	Role	Notes	Ref.
1997	Ivanhoe	Lady Rowena	Miniseries; 6 episodes	
1998	Berkeley Square	Hannah Randall	Series regular; 10 episodes	
1998–1999	Ballykissangel	Orla O'Connell	Series regular; 24 episodes	
2000	North Square	Helen Fernyhough	Series regular; 10 episodes	
2000–2001	Cold Feet	Jane Fitzpatrick	Recurring role; 3 episodes	
2003–2009	Trial & Retribution	DCI Róisín Connor	Series regular; 24 episodes	
2004	The Alan Clark Diaries	Clark's Mistress	Episode: "Into the Wilderness"	
2006	The Shell Seekers	Olivia Keeling	Miniseries; 2 episodes	
2009	The Clinic	Dr. Edel Swift	Recurring role; 5 episodes	
2010	Agatha Christie's Marple	Ella Blunt	Episode: "The Mirror Crack'd from Side to Side"	
2012	Missing	Sloane	Episode: "Ice Queen"	
2013–2014	Dracula	Lady Jayne Wetherby	Series regular; 10 episodes	
2014	The Mentalist	Monica Giraldi	Episode: "Blue Bird"	
2014	Rush	Isabel Thoreau	Episode: "Don't Ask Me Why"	
2014–2018	Once Upon a Time	Cruella De Vil	Series regular; 15 episodes	
2018	Marcella	Maya Whitman	Recurring role; 7 episodes	
2019	Strike Back: Revolution	Lauren Gillespie	Recurring role; 2 episodes	
2021	Around the World in 80 Days	Lady Clemency Rowbotham	Episode: "Episode 5"	
2022	The Man Who Fell to Earth	Penny Morgan	Recurring role; 3 episodes	
2022	Bloodlands	Olivia Foyle	Series regular; 6 episodes	
2024–present	Rivals	Maud O’Hara	Series regular; 8 episodes	

== Awards and nominations ==
Year	Title	Role	Awards	Result
2014	Amnesia: Who Are You?	Monica	IFS Award Best Actress	Won
2016	Once Upon A Time	Cruella de Vil	13th IFTA Film & Drama Awards Best Actress in Supporting Role in Drama	Nominated
2018	The Lears	Diana	15th Irish Film & Television Academy Awards Best Actress in Supporting Role in Film	Won
