= Lauren Bowles =

American actress

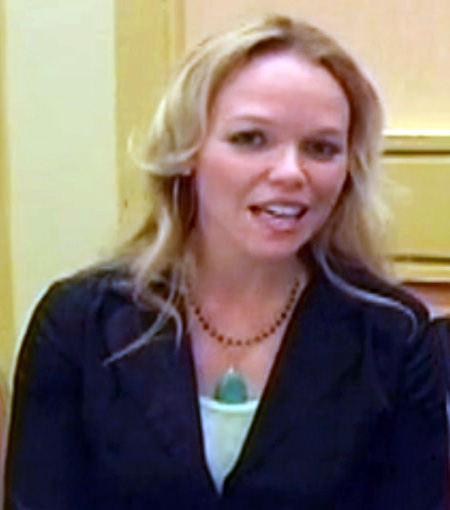
- Bowles interviewed on Count Gore de Vol in 2012
- Education: New York University (BA)
- Occupation: Actress
- Years active: 1994–present
- Spouse: Patrick Fischler (m. 2004)
- Children: 1
- Relatives: Julia Louis-Dreyfus (maternal half-sister); Brad Hall (half brother-in-law); Charlie Hall (half-nephew)

Lauren Bowles is an American actress.

== Early life ==
Bowles majored in drama at New York University.

== Career ==
Bowles has appeared in numerous TV shows, including Arrested Development, CSI: Crime Scene Investigation, Judging Amy and Private Practice. She has appeared with her maternal half-sister, Julia Louis-Dreyfus, in programs such as Seinfeld, as a waitress at the diner; The New Adventures of Old Christine, Watching Ellie, and Veep. She has also appeared in some feature films. In April 2010, she was cast as Holly Cleary, a Wiccan, in the vampire television series True Blood.

She previously appeared on XM Radio's Take Five channel, doing features for their Five Minute Magazine.

== Personal life ==
In 2004, Bowles married actor Patrick Fischler, whom she met in college. Their daughter, Fia Lucille Fischler, was born in April 2009.

== Filmography ==
=== Film ===
Year	Title	Role	Notes
1997	George of the Jungle	Ursula's Friend	
2001	Ghost World	Angry Garage Sale Woman	
2004	Spartan	Entertainment Reporter	
2006	Art School Confidential	Woman Strangled	
2007	The Heartbreak Kid	Tammy	
2009	Dance Flick	Glynn	
2011	Hall Pass	Britney	
2013	Gone Missing	Lisa	
2013	Free Birds	Jake's Mother (voice)	
2013	The Starving Games	Effoff	
2015	Underdog Kids	Mrs. Jones	
2016	Is That a Gun in Your Pocket?	Barb Archer	
2016	Best Fake Friends	Joy	
2017	Little Star	Kara	

=== Television ===
Year	Title	Role	Notes
1991–1998	Seinfeld	Waitress	9 episodes
1996	Townies	Trisha	Episode: "Pilot"
1997	Breast Men	Implant Removal Patient	Television film
1999	Ally McBeal	Callie Horne	Episode: "Pyramids on the Nile"
2002–2003	Watching Ellie	Susan	Main role (16 episodes)
2003	Judging Amy	Erica Costin	Episode: "Tricks of the Trade"
2003	NCIS	Mary Wiles	Episode: "The Curse"
2004	Arrested Development	Stripper	Episode: "Best Man for the Gob"
2005	CSI: Crime Scene Investigation	Ellen the Barmaid	Episode: "Weeping Willows"
2005	Grey's Anatomy	Alice Franklin	Episode: "Who's Zoomin' Who?"
2005	CSI: NY	Jamie Blake	Episode: "Grand Murder at Central Station"
2005	Still Standing	Nancy	Episode; "Still the Fun One"
2006	The Evidence	Cheryl Miller	Episode: "Borrowed Time"
2006	Without a Trace	Lucy Stoker	Episode: "Crossroads"
2006	Four Kings	Judy Richardson	Episode: "Upper West Side Story"
2006	The New Adventures of Old Christine	Patty	Episode: "Some of My Best Friends Are Portuguese"
2007	Veronica Mars	Karin Mackay	Episode: "Weevils Wobble But They Don't Go Down"
2007	The Bill Engvall Show	Alice	Episode: "Jealous Guy"
2007	Side Order of Life	James' Sister	Episode: "Funeral for a Phone"
2008	Unhitched	Annie	Episode: "Pilot"
2008	Criminal Minds	Chloe Kelcher	Episode: "The Angel Maker"
2008	ER	Hannah	Episode: "Another Thursday at County"
2008	Rita Rocks	Audrey	Episode: "Love on the Rocks"
2008	The New Adventures of Old Christine	Patty	Episode: "Happy Endings"
2009	Anatomy of Hope	Dr. Robinson	Unsold pilot
2009	Lie to Me	Valerie Blunt	Episode: "Life Is Priceless"
2010	StarStruck	Sherry Wilde	Television film
2010	Private Practice	Cyndy	Episode: "Triangles"
2010	Cold Case	Jeannette Peterson	Episode: "Flashover"
2010	Good Luck Charlie	Elaine	Episode: "Kwikki Chick"
2010–2014	True Blood	Holly Cleary	Starring role, Seasons 4-7 (48 episodes)
2011	Detroit 1-8-7	Sara Moore	Episode: "Ice Man/Malibu"
2011	Curb Your Enthusiasm	Miriam	Episode: "The Smiley Face"
2011	The Closer	Donna	Episode: "You Have the Right to Remain Jolly"
2013	Mom	Mary	Episode: "Estrogen and a Hearty Breakfast"
2014	Scandal	Harmony	Episode: "Honor Thy Father"
2015	Stalker	Monica Grant	Episode: "Lost and Found"
2015	The Messengers	Senator Cindy Richards	10 episodes
2015	NCIS: Los Angeles	Gaia	Season 7 Episode 7 : "An Unlocked Mind"
2016–2017	Veep	Monica	3 episodes
2016	Her Last Will	Leslie	Television film
2017	Modern Family	Ana	Episode: "Sarge & Pea"
2018	The 5th Quarter	Cecillia Devill	Episode: "Johnny Tomm Surgery"
2018	Another Period	Mother	Episode: "Little Orphan Garfield"
2018	Castle Rock	Lilith	Episode: "The Box"
2020	How to Get Away with Murder	A.U.S.A. Montes	3 episodes
2025	The Hunting Wives	Sienna Colson	3 episodes
