= Best Fake Friends =

- Film poster
- Directed by: Paul Kampf
- Written by: Christi Perry; Sarah Hehman
- Produced by: Benjamin Friedberg; Paul Kampf
- Starring: Lauren Bowles; Max Ryan; Victoria Smurfit; Suleka Mathew; Michelle Arthur; Kiowa Gordon; Sid Mallya
- Cinematography: René Jung
- Edited by: Rich Evirs
- Music by: Chris Cash
- Production company: Equitas Entertainment Partners
- Distributed by: Hollydan Works
- Release date: December 1, 2016
- Running time: 102 minutes
- Country: United States
- Language: English

Best Fake Friends is a 2016 American drama film directed by Paul Kampf and starring Lauren Bowles, Max Ryan, Victoria Smurfit, Suleka Mathew, Michelle Arthur, Kiowa Gordon and Sid Mallya.

== Cast ==
- Lauren Bowles as Joy
- Max Ryan as Mark Dillon
- Victoria Smurfit as Nikki
- Suleka Mathew as Tory
- Michelle Arthur as Rachel
- Jessica Belkin as Emily Dillon
- Kiowa Gordon as William
- Tara Perry as Sandra
- Sid Mallya as Vin

== Reception ==
Steve Rubenstein of the San Francisco Chronicle gave the film zero stars out of four:

“Best Fake Friends is plenty fake, all the way down to the fake cleavages that the fake best friends keep bragging about when they aren’t speaking fake dialogue in a movie that is so fake that the only real thing about it is the $13 you wish you could get back from the box office when it’s over."
