= Vittal Mallya =

Indian entrepreneur

- Born: 8 February 1924; Bantwal, South Canara, Madras Presidency, British India (now in Dakshina Kannada, Karnataka, India
- Died: 13 October 1983 (aged 59); The Taj Mahal Palace Hotel, Mumbai, Maharashtra, India
- Education: The Doon School; Presidency College, Kolkata
- Occupation: Businessman
- Years active: 1947 – 1983
- Organization: United Breweries Group
- Known for: Liquor Baron
- Board member of: United Breweries Group; Mysore Electro-Chemical Works; Kissan Products; Hindustan Cocoa Products; Indian Sewing Machines Company; Hoechst AG; Ismaco; British Paints; Cadbury India; Hindustan Polymers; Bush Boake Allen
- Children: Vijay Mallya
- Relatives: Siddharth Mallya (grandson)

Vittal Mallya (8 February 1924 – 13 October 1983) was an Indian industrialist, best known as the former chair of the India-based United Breweries Group. Mallya is the father of Vijay Mallya.

Vittal Mallya statue near Lavelle Road, Bengaluru in 2026

== Early life and education ==
Vittal Mallya was born in 1924. He was the youngest of the three children of Lt. Col. Bantwal Ganapathi Mallya and his wife Devi Mallya. The family belongs to the Gaud Saraswat Brahmin community of Madhva tradition based in Mangalore and hails from the town of Bantwal.

The young Vittal Mallya gained exposure to the many cultures of India as he grew up in many cantonment towns across India. When he was around 12 years of age, his father's wealth and position as an army officer made it possible for Vittal to be enrolled into The Doon School. Vittal was a bright student at school, and received several double promotions during his academic career for outstanding performance. After finishing school, he was accepted into Presidency College, Kolkata. He chose this college because his father was posted at that time in Kolkata. After his graduation, he traveled abroad for over two years in a sort of grand tour which was undertaken for two reasons: firstly, his father, who had studied in England and was something of an Anglophile, wanted him to have some exposure to Europe and the wider world outside India; secondly, Vittal wanted to see Europe and gain first-hand practical knowledge that he believed to be a lot more valuable than formal education. He also learned Spanish in the process.

== Career ==
In 1946–47 he started acquiring the shares of United Breweries Limited. In 1947, Mallya was elected as United Breweries' first Indian director. After a year, he replaced R. G. N. Price as the chairman of the company. In 1951, he acquired McDowell & Company Limited.

Moving to Bangalore in 1952, Mallya started a steady acquisition of small breweries and distilleries. New breweries were established in Kerala (Cherthala, 1959), Andhra Pradesh (Hyderabad, 1969), Goa (Ponda, 1971) and Bihar (Hatidah, 1973).

By the early 1960s, Mallya, back in Calcutta, gained further control of the liquor market by acquiring Carew & Company Limited and Phipson & Company Limited (the latter a major liquor distribution company), followed in the early 1970s by another distribution firm, Herbertsons Limited.

It also began its association, about this time, with Hoechst AG of Germany while co-promoting Hoechst Pharmaceuticals Limited, now known as Aventis Pharma India.

The simultaneous move into food products started with the acquisition of Kissan Products in 1950. When Herbertsons was pocketed two decades later, Mallya also bagged its Dipy's division, giving him a virtual stranglehold on a series of processed food products.

In 1977, when an official prohibition drive sent the breweries and distilleries into a tailspin, Mallya showed his foresight by buying up or gaining control through management contracts of yet more breweries (Premier, Jupiter, Punjab and Indo-Lowenbrau) and distilleries in Udaipur, Alwar, Mirganj, Serampore and also set up a plant in Pondicherry, as others sold out in the face of a market slump. In the process, he finally pipped Mohan Meakin to the title of beer and liquor king.

Mallya got the Jammu & Kashmir Government to give him two acres on lease to start a nursery, and then distributed hops seedlings to Kashmir farmers and bought up all their produce—giving him effective control of the beer industry's most vital ingredient.

He also became chairman of British Paints with the help of Hoechst AG, which had earlier acquired British Paints' parent company abroad, the Berger group. Then through Cadbury Schweppes, international associates of Kissan Products, he moved on to the board of Cadbury India, to become its chairman a few years later. Taking advantage of disinvestment's by multinationals, he became chairman of the Indian Sewing Machine Company and Malayalam Plantations (large tea and rubber company) and also a director of Bush Boake Allen.

Two other important acquisitions include Hindustan Polymers (taken from the Shriram Group) and Mysore Electro-Chemical Works (makers of MEC batteries).

In 1981, Mallya controlled 10 breweries and 14 distilleries, seven processed food companies, six investment companies, two small packaging units, three drug firms, soft drinks bottling plants, a battery unit and one of the company's two styrene companies, while heading a handful of other companies even though he did not have controlling interest.

== Controversies ==
Business rivals charged him with reveling in the unethical practices of the liquor industry, and maximizing profits by making whisky from molasses instead of malted barley the former process allegedly costing only 5 per cent of the latter, but with the resultant spirit being far more harmful to health.

Mallya's name was also linked in 1980 to the then Maharashtra chief minister A. R. Antulay's controversial decisions on alcohol supply.

== Personal life ==
He was married three times. His first marriage was with Lalitha Ramaiah; they had a son, Vijay Mallya. He then either married or had a relationship with a divorced/widowed woman who was the mother of two daughters already, but they had no children together. His third marriage was to Kailash Advani (known as Ritu Mallya after the marriage), a Mumbai-based Sindhi woman who was a lawyer by education, but who ran a garment business. They also had no children together.

Vittal Mallya was a man of frugal habits who believed in thrift and understatement, values which he tried to inculcate in the young Vijay. One way of doing this was by limiting Vijay's allowance to the bare minimum, and not allowing him luxuries like a car of his own.
