= Raj Shamani =

Indian podcaster (born 1994)

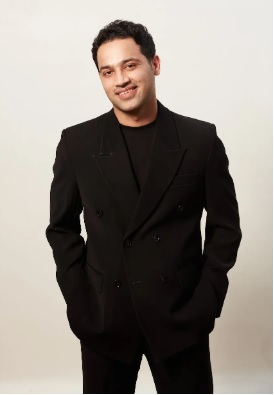
- Born: 29 July 1997 (age 29); Indore, Madhya Pradesh, India
- Known for: Figuring Out with Raj Shamani
- Notable work: Build, Don't Talk

Raj Shamani (born 29 July 1997) is an Indian entrepreneur and podcaster. He is primarily known for hosting the business podcast Figuring Out with Raj Shamani.

== Early life and education ==
Shamani was born in Indore, Madhya Pradesh, into a Sindhi family. His father, Suresh Shamani, was involved in textile and chemical trading. Following his father's health issues and a period of financial difficulty, he began assisting in the family business at the age of 16. He attended the Emerald International School and later Prestige Institute of Management in Indore.

== Career ==
=== Business activities ===
In 2012, Shamani launched a dishwashing liquid product named "Jadugar Drop." In 2015, the venture was integrated with his family's chemical trading business to form Shamani Industries, a manufacturer and distributor of household cleaning products.

Shamani also co-founded "House of X," a platform designed to help digital creators launch consumer brands, and acts as an angel investor for various Indian startups. Shamani is also the founder of Figuring Out Media, an education-first business, along with the Figuring Out Academy. He is a keynote speaker including at the UN Youth Assembly and World Government Summit.

=== Podcast and media ===
In 2021, he launched the podcast Figuring Out with Raj Shamani, which focuses on entrepreneurship and personal development.

In 2022, he wrote the book, Build, Don’t Talk, which he described as a "practical guide teaching essential life skills not covered in school".

In 2024, he was a speaker at the National Creators Award where he addressed Prime Minister Narendra Modi.

In June 2025, the businessman Vijay Mallya gave his first public interview in nine years on the podcast. The four-hour episode garnered 20 million views within four days. Other guests on the podcast have included Emmanuel Macron, Andrew Huberman, Scott Galloway and Bill Gates.

In November 2026, he appeared on a podcast with Sam Altman, discussing OpenAI's early skepticism, scaling, compute investments after GPT-4, and the launch of ChatGPT. The conversation also explored non-consensus bets, leadership, India's importance to OpenAI, founder ambition, AI risks, and the potential of AI to advance scientific discovery. In the same month, his channel became the most-subscribed podcast channel on YouTube.

In November 2026, he made a world record of being the most subscribed Podcaster surpassing Joe Rogan. He currently has 22.6 M subs on his channel and made his show Figuring Out reach a global audience.

== Controversies ==
=== Editing and representation concerns ===
The actor Anupam Kher publicly criticized Shamani in 2025, alleging that parts of his interview were edited in a way that removed key remarks, leading to questions about authenticity and editorial practices.

=== Podcast guest selection ===
In 2025, Shamani faced backlash after hosting the self-proclaimed forex trader Umar Punjabi on his podcast, with several viewers alleging that the guest had been involved in scams. Shamani later deleted the episode. Critics accused him of giving a platform to questionable figures, raising concerns about credibility and responsibility in content creation. Similar criticism had earlier emerged following his interview with Vijay Mallya, with commentators arguing that the platform allowed controversial individuals to present their narratives without sufficient challenge.

=== Legal disputes ===
In 2025, Shamani was involved in a legal matter before the Delhi High Court, where he agreed to edit and remove portions of a podcast episode after concerns were raised about allegedly disparaging claims made during the discussion about Dettol.
