= Kingfisher Airlines =

Indian airline

IATA	ICAO	Call sign
IT	KFR	KINGFISHER
- Founded: 2003; 23 years ago
- Commenced operations: 2005; 21 years ago
- Ceased operations: 2012; 14 years ago
- Hubs: Bengaluru
- Secondary hubs: Delhi; Mumbai
- Focus cities: Chennai; Pune
- Frequent-flyer program: King Club
- Subsidiaries: Kingfisher Xpress
- Destinations: 128
- Parent company: United Breweries Group
- Headquarters: Bengaluru, Karnataka
- Key people: Vijay Mallya (CMD); Sanjay Aggarwal (CEO)
- Revenue: ₹25,982.78 crore (US$2.7 billion) (2012)
- Net income: ₹8,765.9 crore (US$910 million) (2012)
- Employees: 5,696 (2012)

Kingfisher Airlines Limited was an airline group based in India. It was established in 2003 and started its commercial operations in 2005. Through its parent company United Breweries Group, it had a 50% stake in low-cost carrier Kingfisher Red.

Until December 2011, Kingfisher Airlines had the second largest share in India's domestic air travel market. However, the airline ran into continuous losses since its inception, ran high debts and finally closed its operations on 20 October 2012.

== History ==
=== Early years ===
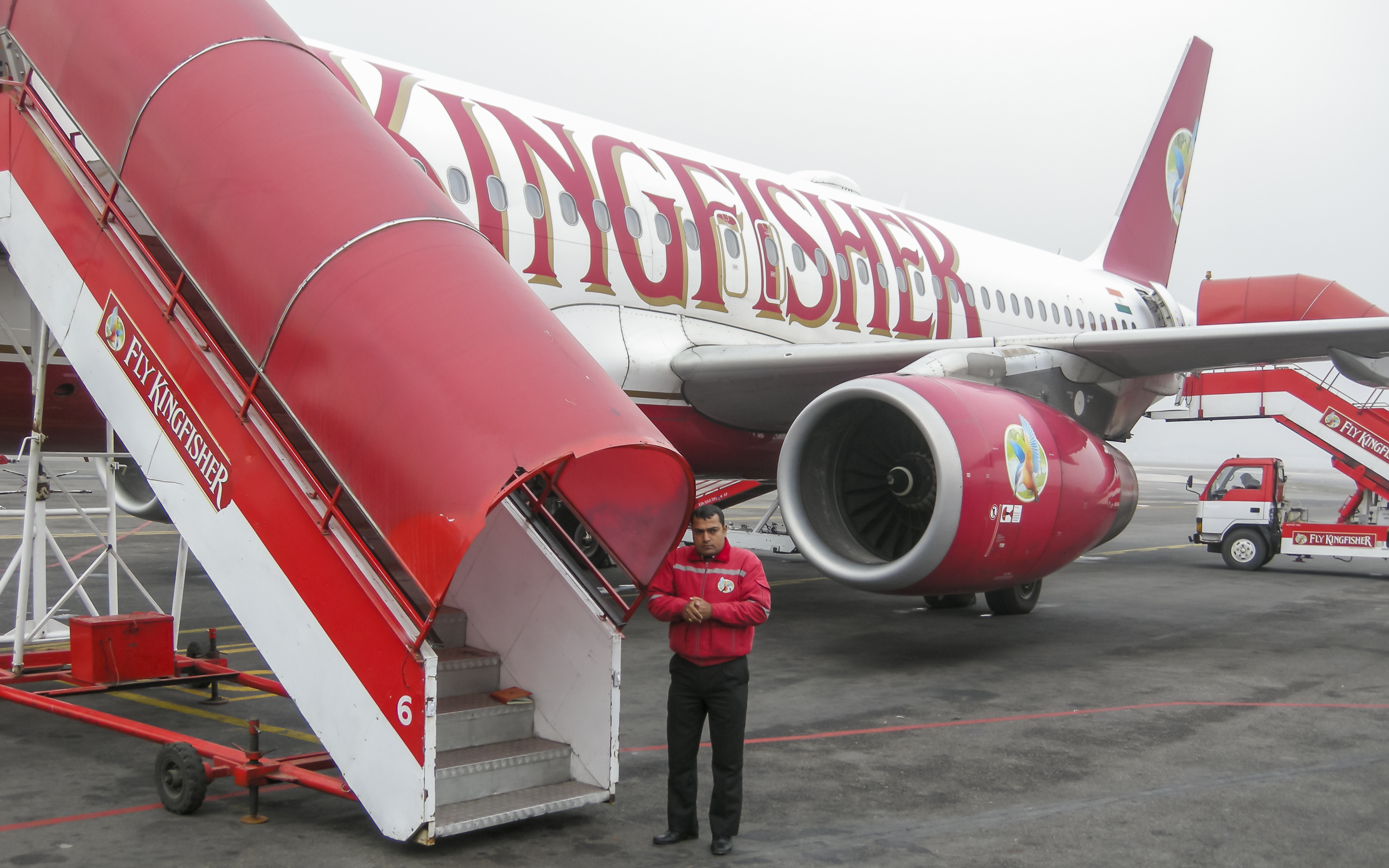
Kingfisher Airlines airplane at Chennai International Airport (MAA)

Kingfisher Airlines was established in 2003. It was owned by the Bengaluru based United Breweries Group. The airline started commercial operations on 9 May 2005, right after Mallya's son Sidhartha's 18th birthday, reportedly as a birthday gift, with a fleet of four new Airbus A320-200s operating a flight from Mumbai to Delhi. It started its international operations on 3 September 2008 by connecting Bengaluru with London. Kingfisher's head office was located in the Kingfisher House in Vile Parle (East), Mumbai, but later moved to The Qube in Andheri (East), Mumbai. Its registered office was located in UB City, Bengaluru. In November 2005, during the World economic forum, the airlines CEO Vijay Mallya announced the airlines intention to launch an IPO to raise 200 million dollars for the airlines expansion and possible takeovers (including that of Air Sahara which was being eyed at that time). It later transpired that the airlines was already heavily in debt and going each year in heavy losses.

=== Bankruptcy, suspension of license and cessation of operations ===
In November 2011, it started to report losses. The acquisition of loss-making Bengaluru-based Air Deccan in 2007 made matters worse. It was believed that Vijay Mallya and his team failed to follow due diligence with the airline and that it was this deal that brought down his empire; courtesy of N M Rothschild consultants who brokered the deal. An initial name change to Simplifly Deccan, followed by Kingfisher Red, and promotion as the domestic budget Kingfisher airline failed to stem losses and Kingfisher suffered a loss of over ₹10 billion (US$100 million) for three consecutive years.

Kingfisher Red's logo

Its low cost carrier Kingfisher Red was shut down in 2011 and in 2012 employees were not being paid salaries so they went on strike. In a disclosure statement to the Bombay Stock Exchange (BSE), the airline explained: "The company has incurred substantial losses and its net worth has been eroded. However, having regard to improvement in the economic sentiment, rationalization measures adopted by the company, fleet recovery and the implementation of the debt recast package with the lenders and promoters including conversion of debt into share capital, these interim financial statements have been prepared on the basis that the company is a going concern and that no adjustments are required to the carrying value of assets and liabilities." This filing was widely covered by Indian and international print and electronic media and analysts. Kingfisher Airlines Lenders later stated they considered the company viable. On 15 November 2011 the airline released poor financial results, indicating that it was "drowning in high-interest debt and losing money". Mallya indicated that his solution was for the government to reduce fuel and other taxes. The government was engaged in assessing whether to bail out the company and other airlines or let market forces determine which survived.

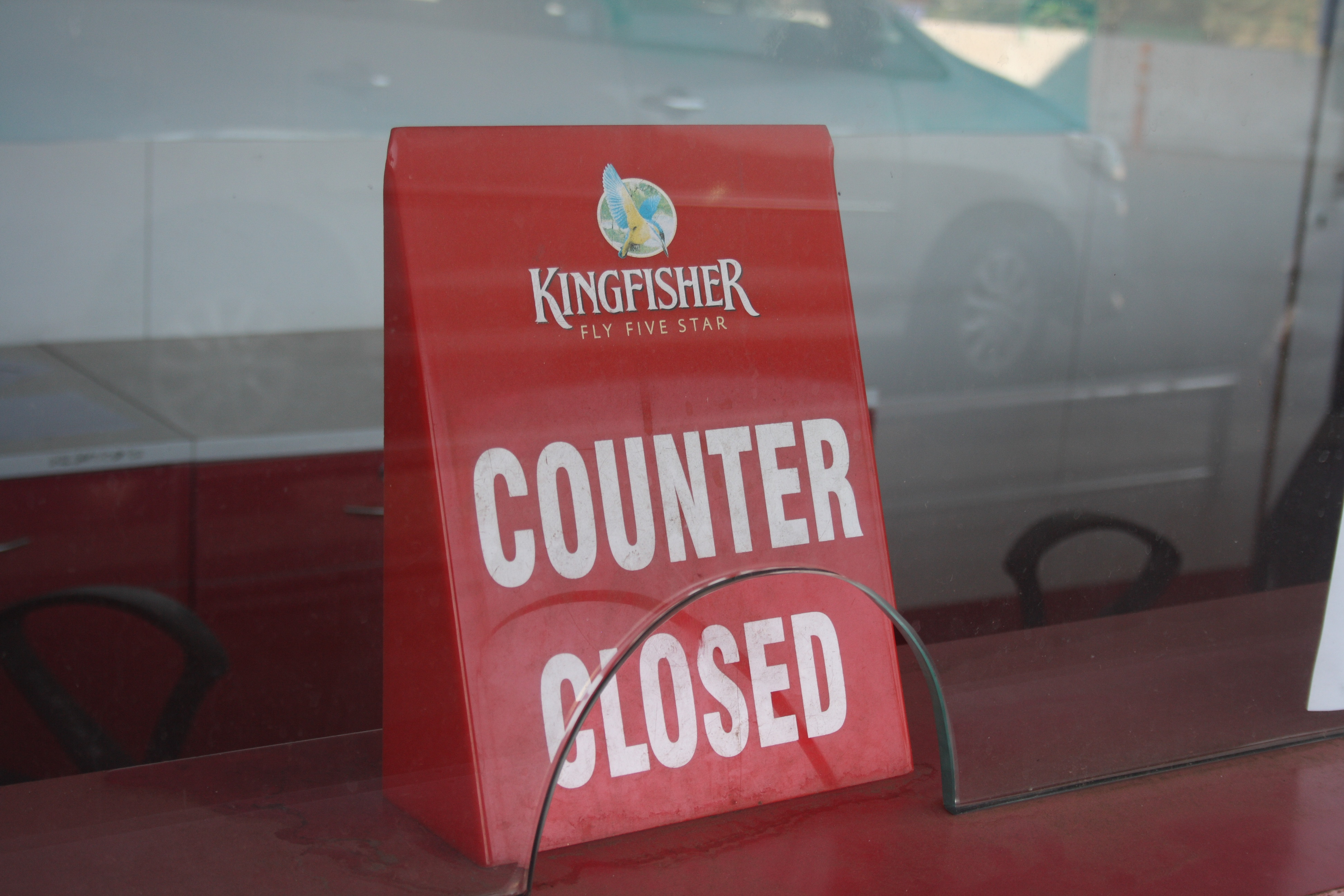
A closed counter after Kingfisher Airlines stopped its service

In December 2011, for the second time in two months, Kingfisher's bank accounts were frozen by the Mumbai Income Tax department for non-payment of dues. The firm owed ₹700 million (US$7.3 million) to the tax department at the time.

By early 2012, the airline accumulated losses of over ₹70 billion (US$730 million) with half of its fleet grounded and several members of its staff going on strike. Kingfisher's position in top Indian airlines on the basis of market share had slipped from second to last due to the crisis. Mallya was looking for buyers for the Vile Parle Kingfisher House. With the freezing of the bank accounts of the airline by the Indian Income Tax Department, the airline was in financial disarray.

On 20 October 2012, Kingfisher Airlines suspended its operations after its licence was suspended by the Directorate General of Civil Aviation after it failed to address the Indian regulator's concerns about its operations. On 25 February 2013, its international flying rights and domestic slots were scrapped by the Indian aviation authorities.

In July 2014, Kingfisher Airlines' indebtedness appeared as the country's state-owned banks' top non-performing asset after failing to repay loans of over ₹40 billion (US$420 million).

On 2 March 2016 after nearly four years of the bankruptcy of Kingfisher Airlines, the consortium of 13 Indian Banks led by State Bank of India moved the Debt Recovery Tribunal to recover its dues which included Rs 9,000 crores owed by its promoter Vijay Mallya. By that time Mallya had left India for the UK despite court proceedings by Indian banks initiated against him. Two years later the British Courts ordered extradition of Mallya after a prolonged legal battle and Mallya could be brought back to India if his appeal against the court order is not turned down.

== Destinations ==
The airline's first long-haul destination was London, England, which was launched in September 2008. It had plans to launch long-haul flights to cities in Africa, Asia, Europe, North America and Oceania with deliveries of new aircraft. All long-haul routes were operated on the Airbus A330-200.

On the day of suspension of all international operations, 10 April 2012, Kingfisher Airlines served 25 domestic destinations within India. At that time, all routes were operated with the Airbus A320 family, ATR 42s, and ATR 72 aircraft.

== Kingfisher employees ==
Kingfisher Employees had their dues prior to the carrier suspending its operations. Employee dues outstanding were at a worth of approximately ₹300 Crore, which has been successfully repaid by the ED on 18 December 2025.

=== Codeshare agreements ===
Prior to the suspension from IATA, Kingfisher had codeshare agreements with:

- American Airlines (Oneworld)
- Asiana Airlines (Star Alliance)
- Finnair (Oneworld)
- Philippine Airlines

== Fleet ==
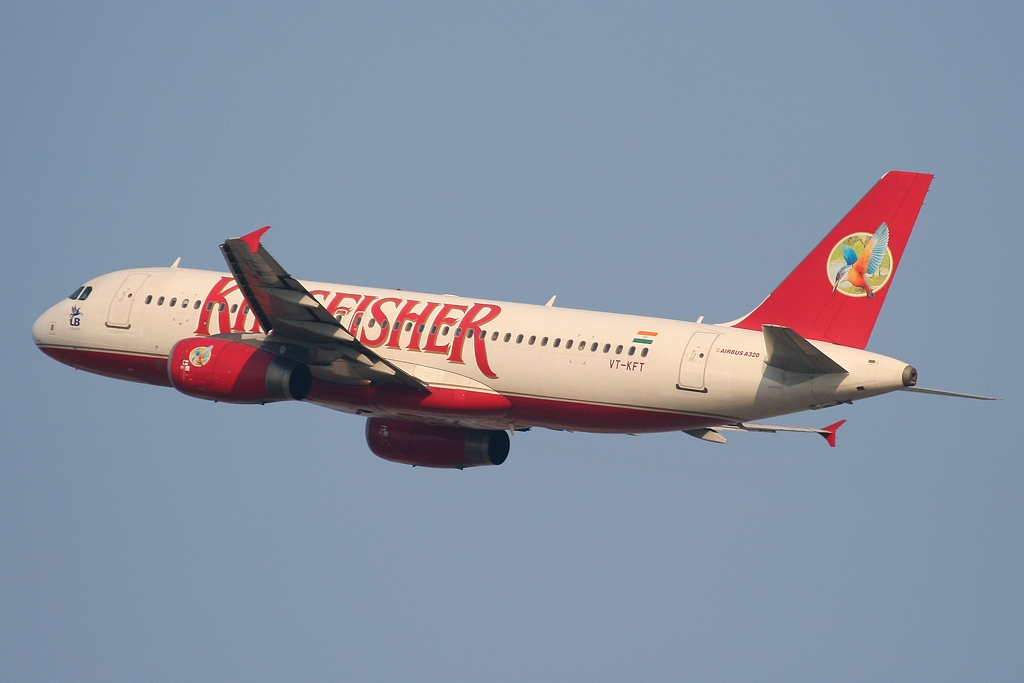
Kingfisher Airbus A320-200

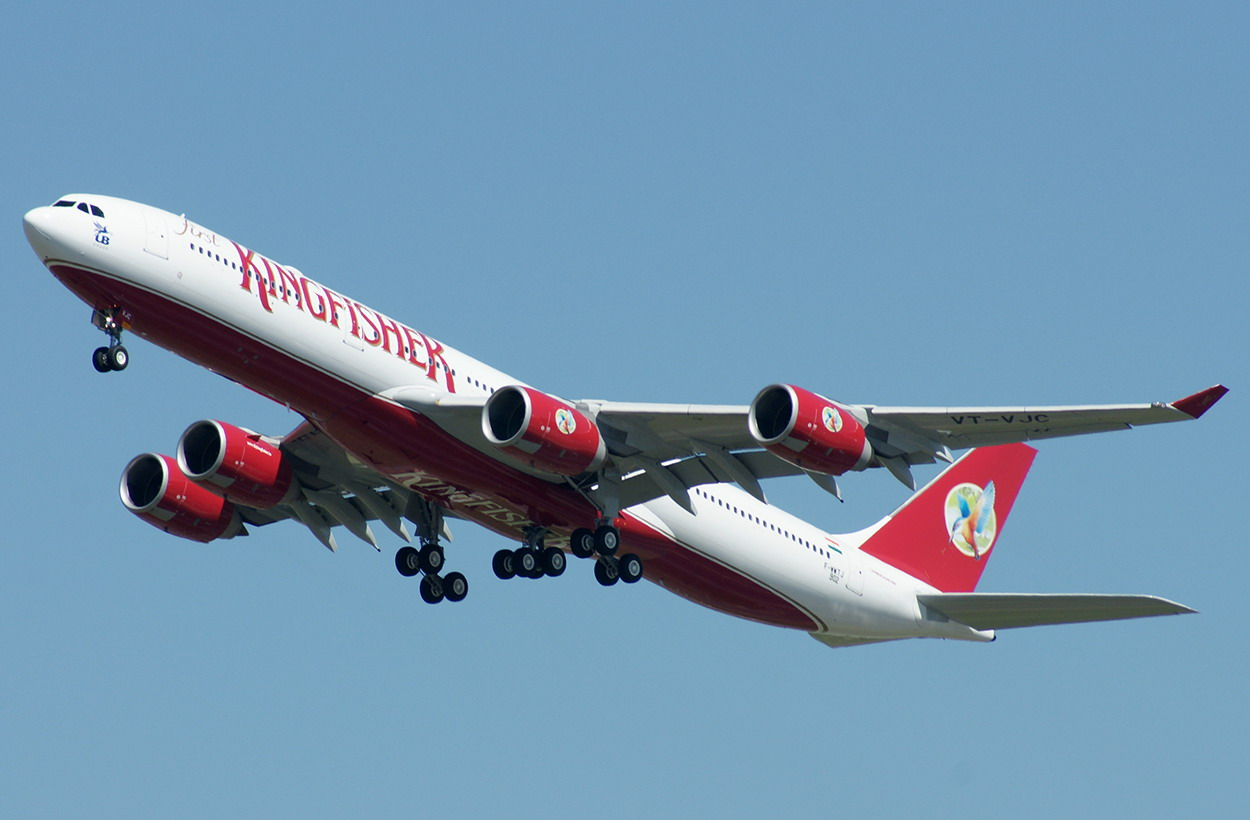
Kingfisher Airbus A340-500. Six of them were ordered in 2006 and scheduled for delivery in 2008 for the airline's planned non-stop service from Bangalore to San Francisco but orders were cancelled after five were built.

Kingfisher Airlines' fleet mainly consisted of ATR 42, ATR 72 and Airbus A320 family aircraft for domestic and short-haul services; and, Airbus A330-200s for international long-haul services. The ATRs and a few aircraft from the A320 family were used for Kingfisher Red services.

At the time the airline ceased operations, it had Airbus A320, Airbus A350 and Airbus A380 aircraft on order.

=== Domestic ===
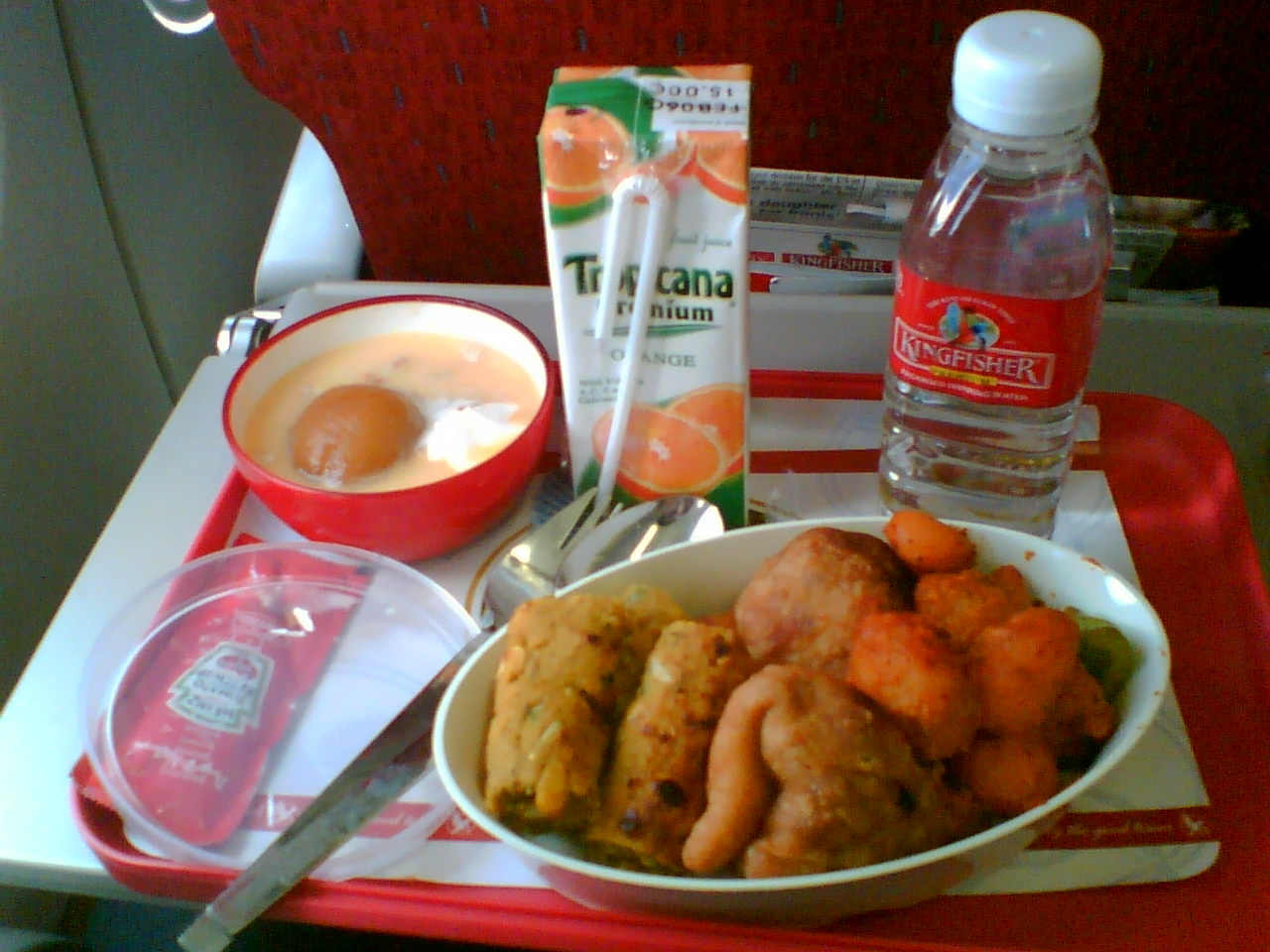
Economy class meal on board a Kingfisher Airlines domestic flight

Kingfisher First

The domestic Kingfisher First, offered on some Airbus A320 family aircraft only, provided seats with a 48-inch (1,200 mm) and 126-degree recline. There were laptop and mobile phone chargers on every seat. There was also a steam ironing service onboard Kingfisher First cabins. Every seat was equipped with a personalised IFE system with AVOD which offered a wide range of Hollywood and Bollywood movies, English and Hindi TV programmes, 16 live TV channels and 10 channels of Kingfisher Radio.

Kingfisher Class

The domestic Kingfisher Class had 32 to 34 inches (810 to 860 mm) seat pitch. Every seat was equipped with personal IFE systems with AVOD on board the Airbus A320 family aircraft. As in Kingfisher First, passengers could access movies, English and Hindi TV programmes, a few live TV channels powered by DishTV, and Kingfisher Radio. Passengers were served meals on most flights. Before take-off, passengers were served bottled lemonade.

=== International ===
Kingfisher First

Kingfisher offered an international business/first product called Kingfisher First which featured full flat-bed seats with 180-degree recline, a pitch of 78 inches (2,000 mm) and width of 20 to 24.54 inches (508 to 623 mm). Passengers were given Merino wool blankets, a Salvatore Ferragamo toiletry kit, pajamas, five-course meals, and alcoholic beverages. In-seat massagers, chargers, and USB connectors were also available. Every Kingfisher First seat had a 17-inch (430 mm) widescreen personal television with AVOD touchscreen controls. It offered 357 hours of programming content spread over 36 channels, including Hollywood and Bollywood movies along with 16 channels of live TV, so passengers could watch their favorite TV programs live. There was also a collection of interactive games, a jukebox with customizable playlists, and Kingfisher Radio. Passengers are given BOSE noise-cancellation headphones. The service on board the Kingfisher First cabins included a social area comprising a full-fledged bar staffed with a bartender, a break-out seating area just nearby fitted with two couches and bar stools, a full-fledged chef on board the aircraft, and any-time dining. A turn-down service included converting the seat into a fully flat bed and a Flight Attendant making the bed when the passenger is ready to sleep.

Kingfisher Class

The international Kingfisher Class seats offered a pitch of 34 inches (860 mm), a width of 18 inches (460 mm) and recline of 25 degrees (6 in [150 mm]). Passengers received full-length modacrylic blankets and full-size pillows. Each Kingfisher Class seat had a 10.6-inch (270 mm) widescreen personal television with AVOD touchscreen controls. The IFE was similar to that of the international Kingfisher First class.

=== In-flight entertainment ===
Kingfisher's IFE system was the Thales TopSeries i3000/i4000 on board the Airbus A320 family aircraft, and Thales TopSeries i5000 on board the Airbus A330 family aircraft provided by the France-based Thales Group. Kingfisher was the first Indian airline to have in-flight entertainment (IFE) systems on every seat even on domestic flights. The inflight magazines were special editions of magazines owned by Mallya's media publishing house (VJM Media) viz. Hi! Blitz for domestic flights and Hi! Living for international flights. Initially, passengers were able to watch only recorded TV programming on the IFE system, but later an alliance was formed with Dish TV to provide live TV in-flight.

=== Loyalty programme ===

The frequent-flyer program of Kingfisher Airlines was called the King Club in which members earned King Miles every time they flew with Kingfisher or its partner airlines, hotels, car rental, finance and lifestyle businesses. There were four levels in the scheme: Red, Silver, Gold and Platinum levels. Members could redeem points over a number of schemes. Platinum, Gold and Silver members enjoyed access to the Kingfisher Lounge, priority check-in, excess baggage allowance, bonus miles, and Kingfisher First upgrade vouchers.

=== Cargo ===
==== Kingfisher Xpress ====
Kingfisher Xpress was a Door-to-Door cargo delivery service launched in February 2010, being the first such service in India promising same-day pick-up in Mumbai, New Delhi, Bengaluru, Hyderabad, Chennai and Kolkata and delivery in up to 18 cities, namely, Siliguri, Bengaluru, Chennai, Coimbatore, Delhi, Kochi, Goa, Guwahati, Hyderabad, Indore, Kolkata, Mumbai, Raipur, Ranchi, Lucknow, Nagpur, Pune and Srinagar. A money-back guarantee was offered.

=== Kingfisher Lounge ===
Kingfisher Lounges were offered to Kingfisher First passengers, along with King Club Silver and King Club Gold members. Lounges were located in:

- Kempegowda International Airport (Bengaluru)
- Chennai International Airport (Chennai)
- Chhatrapati Shivaji Maharaj International Airport (Mumbai)
- Cochin International Airport (Kochi)
- Indira Gandhi International Airport (New Delhi)
- London Heathrow Airport (London)
- Netaji Subhash Chandra Bose International Airport (Kolkata)
- Rajiv Gandhi International Airport (Hyderabad)

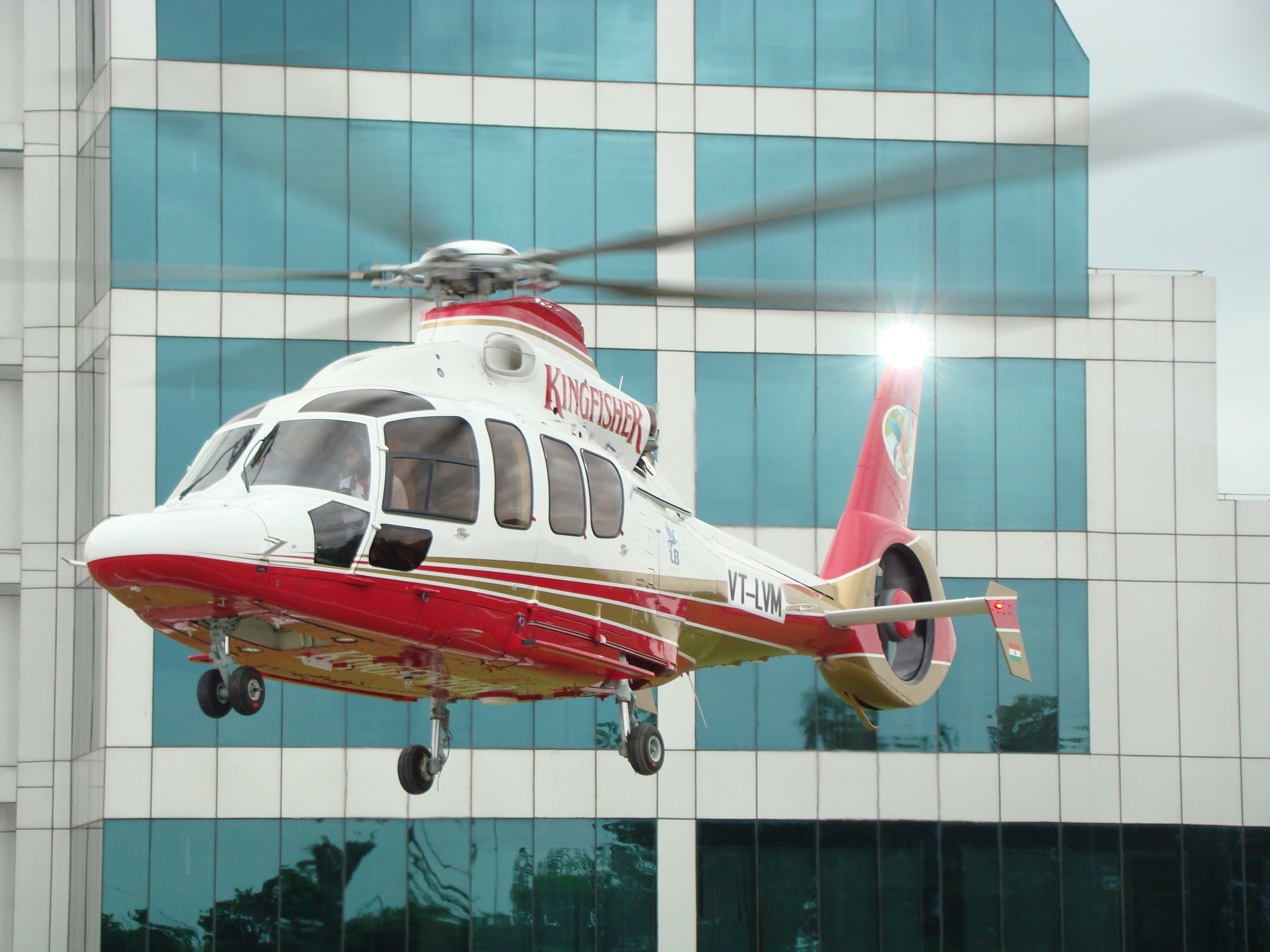
Test flight of EC155 B1 of Kingfisher Airlines

== Accidents and incidents ==
- On 10 November 2009, Flight 4124 to Bhavnagar operated by ATR 72-500 VT-KAC, skidded off the runway after landing at Chhatrapati Shivaji Maharaj International Airport. The aircraft suffered substantial damage, but all 46 passengers and crew escaped unharmed. In November 2010, the Directorate General of Civil Aviation released its final report into the accident. It revealed that the cause of the accident was pilot error, with the aircraft landing at too high a speed and too far down Runway 27A, which was the designation given to Runway 27 whilst it was being operated at a reduced length due to the closure of Runway 14/32 for maintenance.

== In popular culture ==
The airline and its downfall were featured in the episode of "The King of Good Times" in the Netflix series Bad Boy Billionaires: India. The episode showcased about disgruntled employees who had not received their salaries and the apathetic attitude of Vijay Mallya.

A heist comedy film, Crew, starring Tabu, Kareena Kapoor Khan and Kriti Sanon, was inspired by the financial crisis and closure of Kingfisher.

== See also ==
- List of airlines of India
- List of airports in India
- List of companies of India
- Transport in India
