= Sidhartha Vijay Mallya =

American model

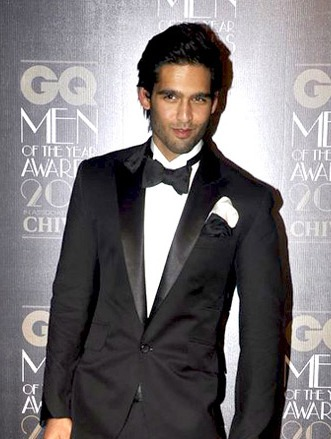
- Mallya at GQ Most Stylish Man awards event (2011)
- Born: May 7, 1987 (age 39); Los Angeles, California, US
- Occupations: Actor and Author
- Spouse: Jasmine (m. 2024)
- Parents: Vijay Mallya (father); Sameera Mallya (mother)
- Relatives: Vittal Mallya (grandfather)

Sidhartha Vijay Mallya (born May 7, 1987) is an American actor and author.

== Early life and education ==
Mallya was born in Los Angeles, California, to Indian businessman Vijay Mallya and former airline hostess Samira Mallya (née Tyabjee). Shortly after his birth, the family moved to England, where he was primarily raised. At the age of 11, his parents sent him to boarding school, firstly Papplewick School in Ascot and then at Wellington College, Berkshire, where he passed his GCSEs and A Levels. After school he attended Queen Mary University of London, where he obtained a bachelor's degree in business management. While at the university, he was also captain of the university field hockey team.

After a brief career in the business world, he decided to pursue a career in the arts. He trained at the Royal Central School of Speech and Drama of the University of London, graduating with a Master of Arts in acting.

== Career ==
Mallya’s initial plan was to join the family business.To prepare him for this, he spent a year working for drinks giant Diageo, as an assistant brand manager on Guinness.

He then moved to India and worked primarily for the Royal Challengers Bangalore (RCB) IPL cricket team, which at the time was owned by his family.

Whilst in India, he started modeling and presenting, appearing on the cover of magazines such as GQ, and on screen for channels such as NDTV. Mallya says that it was these experiences and the positive feedback he received, that lead him to make the switch from the corporate world to the arts.

After deciding to pursue his acting ambitions full time, Mallya moved to Los Angeles in 2012. In 2013, he was selected as part of the ABC Talent Showcase, a platform and training program for aspiring talents, whose previous participants include Academy Award winner Lupita Nyong’o, Chadwick Boseman and Pedro Pascal.

Mallya made his feature film debut in the comedy film Brahman Naman directed by Q and produced by Steve Barron. Brahman Naman premiered at the Sundance Film Festival and was bought by Netflix. He followed that up with roles in ‘Best Fake Friends’ with Victoria Smurfit, and ‘Flashback’ with Emmy Nominee Richard Cabral. He was most recently seen in the Scott Windhauser directed ‘Mafia Wars’ with Tom Welling and Cam Gigandet, and has been announced as one of the leads in Ryuhei Kitamura’s next feature titled ‘Thrill Ride’.

Aside from acting, Mallya is an accomplished author who focuses on the promotion of mental health amongst the youth. His debut book ‘I’f I’m Honest (Penguin Random House) was published in September 2021 to great critical acclaim. His second book titled ‘Sad/Glad’, a picture book written to help children deal with their emotions, was released in 2024 also by Penguin Random House. Sad/Glad has gone on to be a national bestseller, gaining the #1 spot on the Nielsen India bestseller list for English language books.

=== Television and web appearances ===
Year	Show	Role
2011	The Hunt for the Kingfisher Calendar Girl	Self (guest judge)
2012–2013	No Boundaries with Sid Mallya	Self (host and writer)
2013	Hunt for the Kingfisher Calendar Girl	Self (host and judge)

=== Filmography ===
Year	Film	Role	Notes
2016	Brahman Naman (an Indian comedy film shown at the Sundance Film Festival and released exclusively on Netflix)	Ronnie	Released
2016	Best Fake Friends	Vin	Released
2020	Bad Boy Billionaires: India (a three-part Netflix documentary series with an episode focused on his father)	Himself	1 Episode
2024	Mafia Wars	Mangal	Released

== Awards and accolades ==
- Hello! India Hall of Fame Awards Celebutante of the year 2010
- Rotary Vocational Excellence Award 2010
- GQ Men of The Year Awards – Most stylish man in India 2011
- Power Brands Hall of Fame Awards (for work on RCB) 2011
- HT Café Mumbai's Most Stylish Awards 2011
- Top 5 of India's Sexiest Bachelor show on Big CBS Prime 2011
- Panasonic Green Globe Foundation Awards special honour 2012
- Ivy Sports Symposium "10 Next" of the next generation of sports industry leaders 2012

== Personal life ==
Mallya got engaged to his girlfriend Jasmine on Halloween 2023 .They met at the acting studio that they both attended. The couple tied the knot in London on June 22, 2024.
