= Vijay Mallya =

Indian businessman and politician (born 1955)

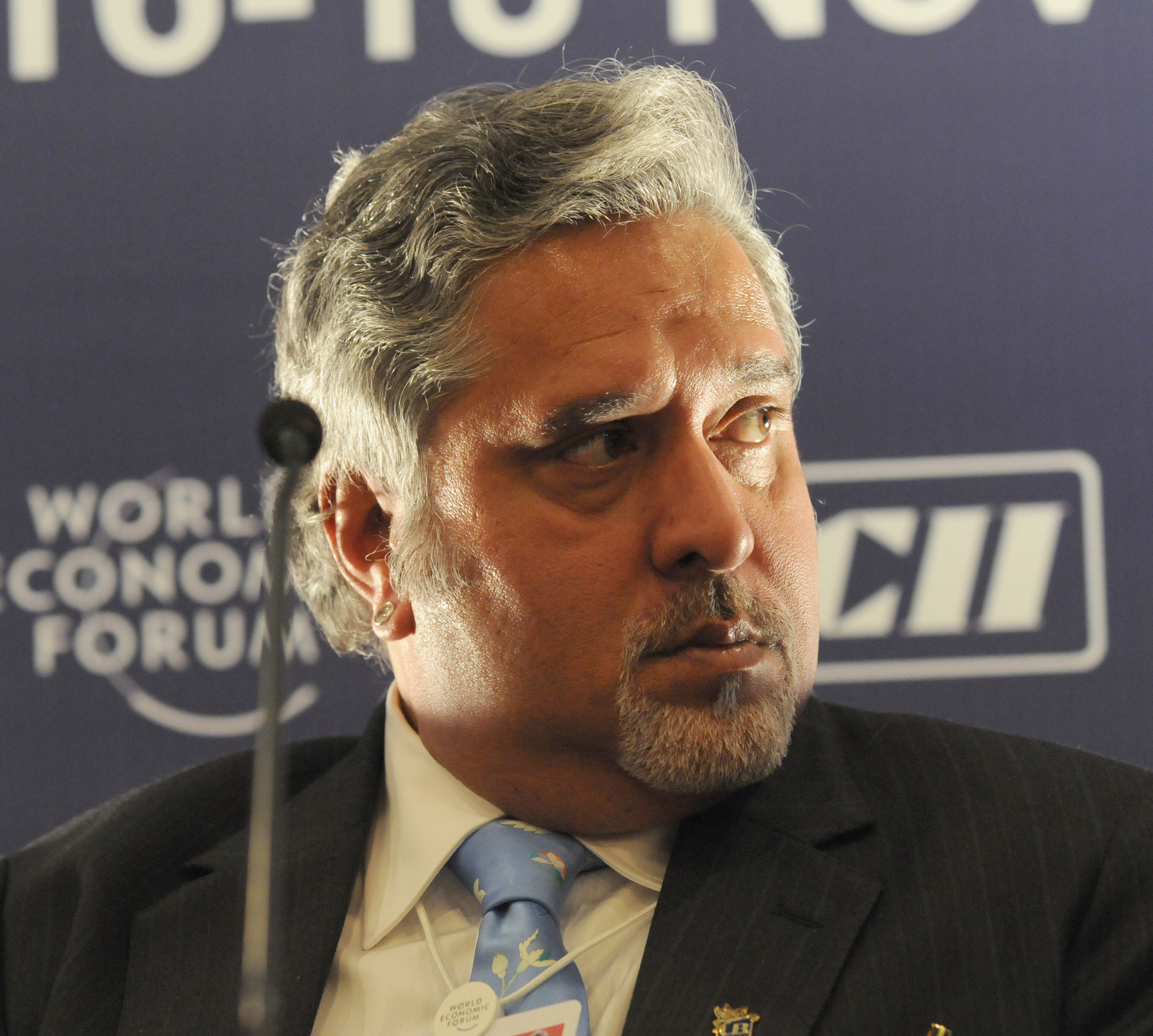
- Mallya in 2008

Member of Parliament, Rajya Sabha
- In office 1 July 2010 – 2 May 2016
- In office 10 April 2002 – 9 April 2008
- Constituency: Karnataka

Personal details
- Born: Vijay Vittal Mallya; 18 December 1955 (age 70) Kolkata, West Bengal, India
- Party: Independent
- Spouses: Sameera Tyabjee Mallya (m. 1986; div. 1987) Rekha Mallya (m. 1993)
- Children: 3, including Siddharth Mallya
- Parent: Vittal Mallya (father)
- Education: La Martinière Calcutta; St. Xavier's College, Kolkata
- Occupation: Businessman; Politician
- Nickname: King of Good Times

Vijay Vittal Mallya (born 18 December 1955) is an Indian businessman and a former politician. He is the subject of an extradition effort by the Indian Government to bring him back from the UK to face charges of financial crimes in India. His last formal appeal against extradition was rejected in 2020, but as of April 2025 the order had not been enforced; the judge in a case rejecting his appeal against bankruptcy said "apparently Dr Mallya is still resisting extradition on other bases which have yet to be resolved".

The son of a businessman who was also in the alcoholic beverages business, Mallya is the former chairman of United Spirits, the largest spirits company in India, and continues to serve as chairman of United Breweries Group, an Indian conglomerate with interests including beverage alcohol, aviation infrastructure, real estate, and fertilizer. He was the chairman of Sanofi India (previously known as Hoechst AG and Aventis) and of Bayer CropScience in India for over 20 years, as well as of several other companies. Mallya was also the founder and former owner of the defunct Kingfisher Airlines and former co-owner of the Force India Formula One team before it went into administration. He is also a former owner of the Royal Challengers Bangalore cricket team.

== Early and personal life ==
Vijay Mallya is the son of Vittal Mallya from Bantwal, Mangalore, Karnataka. Born into the Konkani speaking family of Vittal Mallya and Lalitha Ramaiah. Vittal Mallya was the Chairman of United Breweries Group. Vijay Mallya was educated at La Martinière Calcutta, where he was appointed House Captain of Hastings house in his final year, and at St. Xavier's College, Kolkata, where he graduated with a Bachelor of Commerce degree (with honours) in 1976. While in college, Mallya interned in his family's businesses. After graduating, he interned at the American part of Hoechst AG in the United States.

In 1986, he met and married Samira Tyabjee, an air hostess of Air India. They have one son, Siddharth Mallya, who was born on 7 May 1987. They were divorced shortly afterwards, although Mallya has stated in interviews that he has a "great relationship" with his first wife. In June 1993, Mallya married his current wife Rekha, whom he had known since childhood, and together they have two daughters, Leanna and Tanya. Rekha was previously married twice, and also has a daughter and son, Leila and Kabir, from a previous marriage. Mallya adopted Rekha's daughter Leila. He is reported to be preparing to marry for the third time, to former Kingfisher Airlines air-hostess Pinky Lalwani.

Generally characterized as having an extravagant lifestyle, Mallya was reported in 2005 to be someone who prays every day and conducts the entire 42-day Sabarimala fast every year while wearing only black clothing, and to be a devout follower of Sri Sri Ravi Shankar and the Art of Living Foundation.

Vijay Mallya is an ardent devotee of Lord Venkateshwara of Tirupati, and Kukke Subrahmanya. On his 57th birthday in 2012, he offered 3 kg of gold bricks to Venkateswara Temple, Tirumala. In 2012, he also donated ₹8 million (US$83,000) gold-plated doors for Kukke Subrahmanya. These were done at a time when the Kingfisher Airlines owned by him had to be shut down due to huge financial losses.

== Business career ==
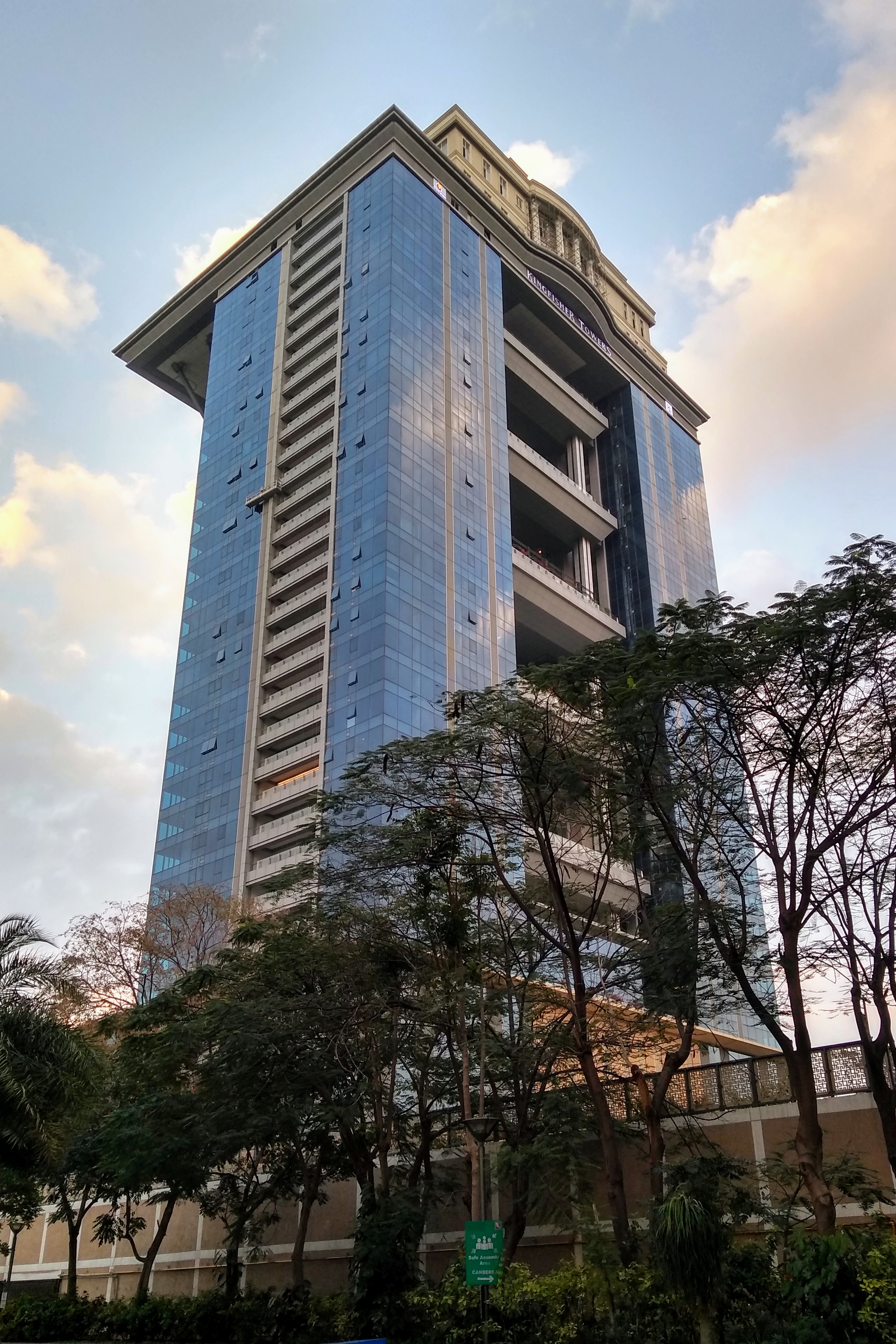
Mansion atop Kingfisher Tower, which is a copy of White House, which used to belong to Mallya

He is the ex-chairman of United Spirits, the largest spirits company in India, and continues to serve as chairman of United Breweries Group, an Indian conglomerate with interests including beverage alcohol, aviation infrastructure, real estate and fertilizer. He has been the chairman of Sanofi India (previously known as Hoechst AG and Aventis) and the chairman of Bayer CropScience in India for over 20 years, and the chairman of several other companies.

The son of businessman Vittal Mallya, he became the chairman of United Breweries Group in 1983 at the age of 28, following his father's death. Since then, the group has grown into a multi-national conglomerate of over 60 companies, with an annual turnover which increased by 64% over 15 years to US$11 billion in 1998–1999. Over the years, he has diversified and acquired Berger Paints, Best and Crompton in 1988; Mangalore Chemicals and Fertilisers in 1990; The Asian Age newspaper and the publisher of film magazines, and Cine Blitz, a Bollywood magazine in 2001.

United's Kingfisher beer has a more than 50% market share in India. It is available in 52 other countries, and leads among Indian beers in the international market.

United Spirits Ltd, the flagship company of the UB Group, achieved the milestone of selling 100 million cases, becoming the second-largest spirits company in the world by volume, under Mallya's chairmanship. In 2012, Mallya ceded management control of United Spirits Limited to global spirits giant Diageo, retaining a minority stake in the business. In February 2015 Mallya was forced to resign as chairman of United Spirits, and he contracted to receive a $75 million severance payment as part of that deal, but the courts in India have blocked that payment.

Kingfisher Airlines, established in 2005, was a major business venture launched by Mallya. It eventually became insolvent and had to be closed down. As of October 2013, it had not paid salaries to its employees for 15 months, had lost its licence to operate as an airline, and owed more than US$1 billion in bank loans. By November 2015, the amount owed to the banks had grown to at least $1.35 billion, and there were other debts owed for taxes and to numerous small creditors. As part of the Kingfisher collapse, Mallya is accused of being a "willful defaulter" under Indian law, including accusations of money laundering, misappropriation, etc.

In March 2016, a consortium of banks approached the Supreme Court of India to stop Mallya from going abroad due to the pending money his companies owed them. As per media reports, he had already left India. On 13 March 2016 a court in Hyderabad issued a non-bailable warrant for Mallya's arrest, but it appears he is remaining at his country estate near London, England, while his lawyer contests the warrant with a higher court. On 18 April 2016, a special court in Mumbai also issued an undated non-bailable arrest warrant against the businessman. This was issued in response to a plea by the Enforcement Directorate on 15 April before the special court hearing cases under the Prevention of Money Laundering Act, 2002. There were allegations on him that he transferred ₹4,000 crore (US$420 million) to tax havens.

In June 2016, the Enforcement Directorate (ED) reported it had "provisionally attached" ₹14.11 billion (US$150 million) rupees worth of Mallya's Indian assets and properties against unpaid loans totalling ₹8.07 billion (US$84 million). On 3 September, it issued a second attachment order for a further ₹66.30 billion (US$690 million) worth of Mallya's assets, including a farmhouse, shares in United Breweries and multiple flats in Bengaluru valued at ₹5.65 billion (US$59 million). By December 2016, the ED has attached a total of ₹96.61 billion (US$1.0 billion) worth of assets of Mallya and Kingfisher in India. This is one of the largest attachment of assets made by the ED in a Prevention of Money Laundering Act case till now. The ED also decided to send letters rogatory (LR) to the US, the UK and Europe requesting them to assist it in attachment of Mallya's over ten foreign assets.

In July 2020, Indian media reported that Mallya had offered a settlement package of ₹139.60 billion (equivalent to ₹180 billion or US$1.9 billion in 2026) as against a total principal amount of ₹90 billion (equivalent to ₹120 billion or US$1.2 billion in 2026) to the consortium of Indian bankers pursuing litigation against him; this settlement was not accepted by the bankers.

== Political career ==
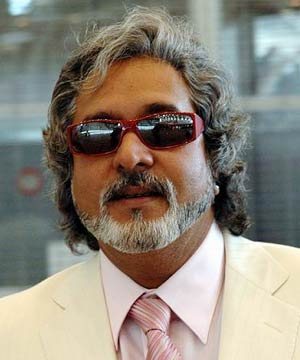
Mallya in 2010

Previously a member of the Akhila Bharata Janata Dal, Mallya joined the Subramanian Swamy–led Janata Party in 2003 and was its National Working President until 2010. He was elected to the Rajya Sabha as independent member twice from his home state of Karnataka, first in 2002 with the support of the Janata Dal (Secular) and Indian National Congress and then in 2010 with the support of the Janata Dal (Secular) and BJP.

On 2 May 2016, Mallya resigned from his post as a Rajya Sabha MP, a week after the Rajya Sabha ethics panel declared that he should no longer be a member of the House and one day before the panel was set to meet again to recommend his expulsion. He had left India during this time, and his passport had been revoked. In his resignation letter, Mallya said he was "shocked that the Department of Financial Services, Ministry of Finance, Government of India has provided factually wrong information to a Parliament Committee" and that he was resigning because he had concluded that he would "not get a fair trial or justice".

== Controversies ==
Once called the "King of Good Times" due to his extravagant lifestyle, Mallya and his companies have been embroiled in financial scandals, and controversies since 2012. Mallya left India on 2 March 2016 after saying he wanted to move to Britain to be closer to his children. A group of 17 Indian banks are trying to collect approximately ₹90 billion (US$930 million) in loans which Mallya has allegedly routed to gain 100% or a partial stake in about 40 companies across the world. Several agencies, including the Income Tax Department and the Central Bureau of Investigation, are investigating Mallya for charges that include financial fraud and money laundering, and the Attorney General said that Mallya's assets abroad are "far in excess to loans taken by him". The 17 banks added a joint petition at the Supreme Court of India in March 2016 to try to prevent Mallya from leaving the country, but the Indian government indicated that he had already left. The Enforcement Directorate of India also filed a money laundering case against him in March 2016 for allegedly sending abroad some ₹9 billion (US$93 million) that had been loaned to his airline.

On 24 April 2016, the Ministry of External Affairs (India) revoked Mallya's passport, and he resigned from the Rajya Sabha on 2 May 2016, the day before their Ethics Committee was prepared to recommend his expulsion. Currently, the Enforcement Directorate is seeking Interpol to raise an international arrest warrant against Mallya. Also, the High Court of Judicature at Hyderabad issued a non-bailable warrant against Mallya on 13 March 2016 for his failure to appear in the court regarding an allegation of cheating the GMR Hyderabad International Airport Ltd by issuing them a dishonoured cheque for ₹5 million (US$52,000).

On 13 June 2016, the Prevention of Money Laundering Act (PMLA) court declared Mallya a "proclaimed offender" on a request by the Enforcement Directorate (ED) in connection with its money laundering probe against him in an alleged ₹90 billion (US$930 million) loan default case.

Mallya co-owned the Formula One team Force India from 2007 to 2018. In the middle of the 2018 Formula One season, Sahara Force India went into administration due to financial trouble. In August 2018, the team's assets were purchased by Racing Point F1 Team, and continued to race under the Force India name for the remainder of the 2018 season.

=== Accusations ===
On 18 April 2017, Mallya was arrested by the UK Metropolitan Police extradition unit "on behalf of the Indian authorities in relation to accusations of fraud", and was released on bail pending further consideration of the case. On 9 May 2017, the Supreme Court of India found Mallya guilty of contempt of court and summoned him to appear on 10 July. When he failed to appear, the Supreme Court said the contempt case would only proceed further after he is produced before the court. Mallya dismissed the proceedings against him – calling the situation a "witch hunt". He said "I have done absolutely nothing wrong. In fact I am glad that it is finally before a UK court and an impartial court. So we wait and see how it plays out." In the meantime, he is not allowed to leave Britain, but he said that is no hardship for him. He said "There's nothing to miss" for him about India, since his immediate family has all moved to England or the United States.

On 3 October 2017, Mallya was arrested as part of a money-laundering case in London and was released on bail.

An appeal to extradite him from Britain was filed on charges of bank fraud estimated at ₹90 billion (US$930 million). The final hearing on extradition will be held at the Westminster Magistrate's Court on 31 July.

Mallya is on bail since his arrest on an extradition warrant in April 2017. Mallya is fighting an extradition case in the UK. On 16 June 2018 Vijay Mallya was ordered to pay £200,000 (₹18.1 million) to Indian banks by a United Kingdom court. He was also asked to pay money towards registration of worldwide freezing order and of Karnataka's Debt Recovery Tribunal (DRT). Vijay Mallya has to pay dues to 13 banks namely- SBI, BOB, Corporation Bank, Federal Bank Ltd, IDBI Bank, Indian Overseas Bank, J&K Bank, Punjab and Sind Bank, PNB, State Bank of Mysore, UCO Bank, UBI and JM Financial Asset Reconstruction Co. Pvt Ltd. The consortium attempted to gain possession of Mallya's £20 million property on Cornwall Terrace in London, but Mallya claimed it was owned by his mother.

UBS went to court in 2018, seeking to evict Mallya, his son Sidhartha and his mother Lalith from Cornwall Terrace. A trial was set for May 2019. The trial did not go ahead since Mallya drew up a settlement with UBS. According to the terms of the agreement, Mallya can remain in the property and if the mortgage is not repaid by April 2020, UBS has a right to immediate possession. Mallya must also pay the interest of £820,333 accrued up to April 2019 plus any further amount accrued up to 1 May 2020. He was also instructed to pay legal costs of £1,047,081 and receivers' costs of £223,863. In December 2018, the court ruled that he can be extradited to India to face fraud investigations. In July 2019, Mallya was granted permission to appeal to London's High Court against his extradition. In April 2020, the plea file by Vijay Mallya against his extradition to India was rejected by London High court.

Vijay Mallya lost his final appeal against extradition. Mallya had filed an appeal in the UK Supreme Court earlier in month of May 2020 in the wake of losing an appeal in the London High Court against an extradition order to India on alleged charges of fraud and money laundering related to unrecovered loans to Kingfisher Airlines. It was said that he could be extradited in next 28 days. However, in October 2020 the Indian government was notified that Mallya could not be currently extradited due to an unspecified "confidential legal matter".

On 11 July 2022, the Supreme Court sentenced Mallya to four months in jail and imposed a Rs 2,000 fine on him in a 2017 contempt of court case. He was convicted of contempt in 2017 over transferring US$40 million to his children in violation of court orders. In addition to the jail term, the top court required Mallya to deposit the $40 million with 8 percent interest within four weeks to the Supreme Court legal services authority, on pain of attachment of properties and a further sentence of two months.

=== Leaked documents ===
Mallya was named in the Panama Papers and Paradise Papers, leaked confidential documents relating to offshore investment.

=== Public appearance in a podcast ===
In June 2025, Vijay Mallya made a rare public appearance in Raj Shamani's podcast for a four-hour-long interview. The interview marked one of Mallya's first in-depth public commentaries since leaving India in 2016.

The appearance triggered renewed media coverage and public debate in India, with users calling it as an attempt to whitewash his image, with criticism over the platforming of a controversial figure amidst his fugitive status.

Mallya claimed he repaid ₹14,000 crore (US$1.5 billion) against loans totaling ₹6,200 crore (US$640 million).

== Awards ==
Mallya has received several professional awards both in India and overseas:

- Honorary degree of Doctorate of Philosophy in Business Administration, by the Southern California University for Professional Studies (1997). Southern California University is not affiliated with the prestigious University of Southern California.
- "Officier de la Légion d'Honneur" (sometime prior to 2012), a high award of recognition in France (sometime prior to 2014).
- "Global leader for tomorrow", World Economic Forum (sometime prior to 2014).
- "Entrepreneur of the Year" award at The Asian Awards (2010).

== In popular culture ==
- Bad Boy Billionaires: India – 2020 Netflix original documentary anthology webseries

== See also ==
- List of people from Karnataka
- Prestige Kingfisher Towers

Mallya failed to meet the court deadline to appear in person at Mumbai High Court in February 2026 to challenge his Fugitive Economic Offender designation."Vijay Mallya misses Mumbai court deadline in fugitive offender case". The Drinks Business. 20 February 2026.==References==

In February 2026, the Bombay High Court gave Mallya a final chance to return to India to challenge his Fugitive Economic Offender status."Bombay High Court gives Vijay Mallya final chance to return and contest fugitive status". The Drinks Business. 17 February 2026.==External links==

- United Breweries (UB) Group
- United Spirits Limited (USL)
- Kingfisher Airlines Limited – KFA
- Mallya in Parliament
- McDowell Mohun Bagan
