= Agasarahalli =

Agasarahalli may refer to:

- Agasarahalli, Nelamangala, a village in Karnataka, India
- Agasarahalli (Channarayapatna), a village in Karnataka, India
- Agasarahalli (Hosadurga), a village in Karnataka, India
- Agasarahalli (Hosakote), a village in Karnataka, India
- Agasarahalli (Krishnarajpet), a village in Karnataka, India
