= Agalakote =

Agalakote may refer to:

- Agalakote (Devanahalli)
- Agalakote (Magadi)
- Agalakote (Malur)
- Agalakote (Tumkur)
