= Pemmanahalli =

- village
- Location in Karnataka, India Pemmanahalli (India)
- Coordinates: 13.2309155°N 77.2663771°E
- Country: India
- State: Karnataka
- District: Bengaluru North
- Taluks: Nelamangala

Government
  - Body: Nelamangala Poursabha

Languages
  - Official: Kannada
- Time zone: UTC+5:30 (IST)
- Postal code: 562111
- Nearest city: Bangalore
- Civic agency: Village Panchayat

Pemmanahalli is a village in the southern state of Karnataka, India. It is located in the Nelamangala taluk of Bengaluru North district.

== Demographics ==
Pemmanahalli had population of 666 of which 353 are males while 313 are females as per report released by Census India 2011.

== Geography ==
The total geographical area of the village is 188.22 hectares.

== Transportation ==
Bus Route from Bengaluru City is available through Yeshwantapura - Nelamangala. The nearest railway connection is Hirehalli railway station located on Bangalore–Arsikere–Hubli line.

== See also ==
- Lakkuru
- Bengaluru North district
