= Goraghatta =

- Village
- Location in Karnataka, India
- Coordinates: 13.292°N 77.543°E
- Country: India
- State: Karnataka
- District: Bangalore Rural
- Elevation: 880 m (2,890 ft)

Languages
  - Official: Kannada
- Time zone: UTC+5:30 (IST)
- PIN: 561 204
- Vehicle registration: KA-52

Goraghatta is a village in the taluk of Nelamangala in Bangalore Rural District of Karnataka State, India. Goraghatta rests on the border between Nelmangala and Doddaballapura.

== Offices ==
- Village Accountant Office, Goraghatta
- Govt Higher Primary School, Goraghatta
- Goraghatta Milk Producers Co-operative Society Limited
