= Vishwanathapura, Bengaluru North district =

Vishwanathapura
- Village
- Vishwanathapura
- Location in Karnataka, India
- Coordinates: 13.2803066°N 77.6227212°E
- Country: India
- State: Karnataka
- District: Bengaluru North
- Taluk: Devanahalli

Government
  - Body: Grama Panchayath

Area
  - Total: 2.3 km^{2} (0.89 sq mi)
- Elevation: 930 m (3,050 ft)

Population (2011)
  - Total: 1,701
  - Density: 740/km^{2} (1,900/sq mi)

Languages
  - Official: Kannada
- Time zone: UTC+5:30 (IST)
- PIN: 562110
- Vehicle registration: KA-43

Vishwanathapura is a village in Devanahalli taluk in Bengaluru North district of Karnataka, India. It is located 13 km from both Devanahalli (towards west) and Doddaballapura (towards east).

As per census survey 2011, its location code number is 625274.

It lies on National Highway 648 between Doddaballapura and Devanahalli. It is around 38 km north, from the state capital Bengaluru.

This region is famous for growing Devanahalli pomelo, which is protected under GI Tag.

== Administration ==
The District Administration Building that hosts the offices of Deputy Commissioner, Zilla Panchayath and District Health Officer of Bengaluru North district is located in Vishwanathapura, making it the de facto capital of Bengaluru North district. Vishwanathapura also has a police station.
