= Heggunda =

- village
- Location in Karnataka, India Heggunda (India)
- Coordinates: 13.2779064°N 77.2584755°E
- Country: India
- State: Karnataka
- District: Bengaluru North
- Taluks: Nelamangala

Government
  - Body: Nelamangala Poursabha

Languages
  - Official: Kannada
- Time zone: UTC+5:30 (IST)
- Postal code: 562111
- Nearest city: Bangalore
- Civic agency: Village Panchayat

Heggunda is a village in the southern state of Karnataka, India. It is located in the Nelamangala taluk of Bengaluru North district.

== Demographics ==
Heggunda had population of 2,079 of which 1,049 are males while 1,030 are females as per report released by Census India 2011.

== Geography ==
The total geographical area of village is 490.72 hectares.

== Bus Route from Bengaluru City ==
Yeshwantapura - Darasahalli - Nelamangala

== See also ==
- Dasenahalli
- Bengaluru North district
