= Aladahalli =

- village
- Location in Karnataka, India Aladahalli (India)
- Coordinates: 13.181587717359704°N 77.2768655481243°E
- Country: India
- State: Karnataka
- District: Bengaluru North
- Taluks: Nelamangala

Government
  - Body: Nelamangala Poursabha

Languages
  - Official: Kannada
- Time zone: UTC+5:30 (IST)
- Postal code: 562123
- Nearest city: Bengaluru
- Civic agency: Village Panchayat

Aladahalli is a village in the southern state of Karnataka, India. It is located in the Nelamangala taluk of Bengaluru North district.

== See also ==
- Bengaluru North district
- Districts of Karnataka
