= Thyamagondlu =

- village
- Country: India
- State: Karnataka
- District: Bengaluru North
- Talukas: Nelamangala

Population (2001)
  - Total: 8,186

Languages
  - Official: Kannada
- Time zone: UTC+5:30 (IST)

Thyamagondlu is a village in the state of Karnataka in southern India. It is located in the Nelamangala taluk of Bengaluru North district.

== Demographics ==
As of 2001 India census, Thyamagondlu had a population of 8186 with 4208 males and 3978 females.

== See also ==
- Bengaluru North district
- Districts of Karnataka
