= Muddalinganahalli Halt railway station =

Railway station in Karnataka

Muddalinganahalli Halt

General information
- Location: Muddalinganahalli, Bengaluru North district, Karnatak; India
- Coordinates: 13°14′21″N 77°18′17″E
- Elevation: 891 metres (2,923 ft)
- System: Indian Railways station
- Owner: Indian Railways
- Operator: South Western Railway
- Line: Bangalore–Arsikere–Hubli line
- Platforms: 2
- Tracks: Double Electric-Line

Construction
- Structure type: Standard (on ground)

Other information
- Status: Functioning
- Station code: MDLL
- Zone(s): South Western Railway
- Division(s): Bangalore

Services
Preceding station	Indian Railways	Following station
Dodbele towards ?	South Western Railway zone Bangalore–Arsikere–Hubli line	Nidvanda towards ?
Location
- Interactive map

Muddalinganahalli Halt railway station is a halt railway station in located on Bangalore–Arsikere–Hubli railway line operated by the South Western Railway zone under Bangalore railway division. It is situated at Muddalinganahalli in Bengaluru North district in the Indian state of Karnatak.
