= Yentaganahalli =

- Village
- Location in Karnataka, India Yentaganahalli (India)
- Coordinates: 13°3′43″N 77°20′32″E
- Country: India
- State: Karnataka
- District: Bengaluru North
- Subdistrict: Nelamangala

Population (2011)
  - Total: 1,158
- Time zone: UTC+05:30 (IST)
- Pincode: 562123
- Telephone code: 08118

Yentaganahalli is a village in Nelamangala taluk, Bengaluru North district, Karnataka, India. The population was 1,158 at the 2011 Indian census. The city belongs to Bangalore division.
