= Bugadihalli =

- village
- Location in Karnataka, India Bugadihalli (India)
- Coordinates: 13.2869216°N 77.2548837°E
- Country: India
- State: Karnataka
- District: Bengaluru North
- Taluks: Nelamangala

Government
  - Body: Nelamangala Poursabha

Languages
  - Official: Kannada
- Time zone: UTC+5:30 (IST)
- Postal code: 562111
- Nearest city: Bengaluru
- Civic agency: Village Panchayat

Bugadihalli is a village in the southern state of Karnataka, India. It is located in the Nelamangala taluk of Bengaluru North district.

== Demographics ==
Bugadihalli had population of 667 of which 364 are males while 303 are females as per report released by Census India 2011.

== Geography ==
The total geographical area of village is 216.13 hectares.

== Bus route from Bengaluru City ==
Yeshwantapura - Darasahalli - Nelamangala

== See also ==
- Heggunda
- Bengaluru North district
