= Halenijagal =

- village
- Location in Karnataka, India Halenijagal (India)
- Coordinates: 13.2342173°N 77.2476997°E
- Country: India
- State: Karnataka
- District: Bengaluru North
- Taluks: Nelamangala

Government
  - Body: Nelamangala Poursabha

Languages
  - Official: Kannada
- Time zone: UTC+5:30 (IST)
- Postal code: 562111
- Nearest city: Bangalore
- Civic agency: Village Panchayat

Halenijagal is a village in the southern state of Karnataka, India. It is located in the Nelamangala taluk of Bengaluru North district.

== Demographics ==
Halenijagal had population of 1,006 of which 507 are males while 499 are females as per report released by Census India 2011.

== Geography ==
The total geographical area of village is 773.39 hectares.

== Transport ==
Bus Route from Bengaluru City is available through Yeshwantapura - Darasahalli - Nelamangala - Dabaspete. The nearest railway connection is Dobbspet railway station.

== See also ==
- Bettadahosahalli
- Bengaluru North district
