= Jinkebachalli =

Jinkebachalli Jinke Bachhahalli
- Village
- Location in Karnataka, India Jinkebachalli (India)
- Coordinates: 13.000°N 77.000°E
- Country: India
- State: Karnataka
- District: Bangalore Rural
- Elevation: 880 m (2,890 ft)

Population (2001)
  - Total: 2,509

Languages
  - Official: Kannada
- Time zone: UTC+5:30 (IST)
- PIN: 561 203
- Telephone code: 08119

Jinke Bachhahalli or Jinkebachchahalli (Village ID 625127) is a centrally located village 5 km from Doddaballapur and 35 km from Bangalore in Karnataka State of India. The main occupation of the people is agriculture. Kannada is the main language spoken. According to the 2011 census it has a population of 1088 living in 251 households.

== Development ==
Jinke Bacjjahalli houses a school, Sree Anjaneya Temple, dairy and many other activities.

== Weather ==
Jinke Bachhahalli receives scanty rainfall compared to other catchment areas in Karnataka. This is one of the reasons for water scarcity in the village as well as in villages surrounding Doddaballapura. Most of the underground water is often depleted due to low rainfall.
