= Hirehalli railway station =

Railway station in Karnataka

Hirehalli

General information
- Location: Pemmanahalli, Bengaluru North district, Karnatak; India
- Coordinates: 13°16′54″N 77°11′20″E
- Elevation: 861 metres (2,825 ft)
- System: Indian Railways station
- Owner: Indian Railways
- Operator: South Western Railway
- Line: Bangalore–Arsikere–Hubli line
- Platforms: 3
- Tracks: Double Electric-Line

Construction
- Structure type: Standard (on ground)

Other information
- Status: Functioning
- Station code: HHL
- Zone(s): South Western Railway
- Division(s): Bangalore

Services
| Preceding station | Indian Railways | Following station |
|---|---|---|
| Dobbspet towards ? | South Western Railway zone Bangalore–Arsikere–Hubli line | Kyatsandra towards ? |
Location
- Interactive map

Hirehalli railway station is a railway station in located on Bangalore–Arsikere–Hubli railway line operated by the South Western Railway zone under Bangalore railway division. It is situated at Pemmanahalli in Bengaluru North district in the Indian state of Karnatak.
