= Bhairanayakanahalli =

Village in Karnataka, India

Coordinates: 13.194955°N 77.382399°E

Bhairanayakanahalli is a village of Nelamangala subdistrict, Bengaluru North district in the state of Karnataka, India. It is located about 40 km north-west of Bangalore. In 2011, the population was 1050 with 596 males and 454 females.

The Bhairanayakanahalli railway station is a halt Railway Station which is a connecting place for surrounding villages like Chikkahalli, Kamasandra, Vadagere, Kenjiganahalli, Hasurahalli, Baradi, etc.
