= Devarahosahalli =

- village
- Location in Karnataka, India Devarahosahalli (India)
- Coordinates: 13.2610825°N 77.1916497°E
- Country: India
- State: Karnataka
- District: Bangalore Rural
- Taluks: Nelamangala

Government
  - Body: Nelamangala Poursabha

Languages
  - Official: Kannada
- Time zone: UTC+5:30 (IST)
- Postal code: 562111
- Nearest city: Bangalore
- Civic agency: Village Panchayat

Devarahosahalli is a village in the southern state of Karnataka, India. It is located in the Nelamangala taluk of Bangalore Rural district.

== Demographics ==
Devarahosahalli had population of 1,258 of which 631 are males while 627 are females as per report released by Census India 2011.

== Geography ==
The total geographical area of village is 316.43 hectares.

== Bus Route from Bengaluru City ==
Yeshwantapura - Nelamangala - Dabaspete

== See also ==
- Halenijagal
- Bengaluru Rural District
