= Bettadahosahalli =

- village
- Location in Karnataka, India Bettadahosahalli (India)
- Coordinates: 13.264464°N 77.2304564°E
- Country: India
- State: Karnataka
- District: Bengaluru North
- Taluks: Nelamangala

Government
  - Body: Nelamangala Poursabha

Languages
  - Official: Kannada
- Time zone: UTC+5:30 (IST)
- Postal code: 562111
- Nearest city: Bengaluru
- Civic agency: Village Panchayat

Bettadahosahalli is a village in the South Indian state of Karnataka. It is located in the Nelamangala taluk of Bengaluru North district.

== Demographics ==
Bettadahosahalli had population of 87 of which 39 are males while 48 are females as per report released by Census India 2011.

== Geography ==
The total geographical area of village is 116.00 hectares.

== Bus route from Bengaluru City ==
Yeshwantapura - Dasarahalli - Nelamangala

== See also ==
- Bugadihalli
- Bengaluru North district
