= Bhairanayakanahalli railway station =

Railway station in Karnataka

Bhairanayakanahalli

General information
- Location: State Highway 74, Bhairanayakanahalli, Bengaluru North district, Karnataka; India
- Coordinates: 13°11′39″N 77°23′00″E
- Elevation: 903 metres (2,963 ft)
- System: Indian Railways station
- Owner: Indian Railways
- Operator: South Western Railway
- Line: Bangalore–Arsikere–Hubli line
- Platforms: 2
- Tracks: Double Electric-Line

Construction
- Structure type: Standard (on ground)

Other information
- Status: Functioning
- Station code: BNKH
- Zone(s): South Western Railway
- Division(s): Bangalore

Services
Preceding station	Indian Railways	Following station
Golhalli towards ?	South Western Railway zone Bangalore–Arsikere–Hubli line	Dodbele towards ?
Location
- Interactive map

Bhairanayakanahalli Railway Station sign

Bhairanayakanahalli railway station is a railway station in located on Bangalore–Arsikere–Hubli railway line operated by the South Western Railway zone under Bangalore railway division. It is situated beside State Highway 74 at Bhairanayakanahalli in Bengaluru North district in the Indian state of Karnatak.
