= Arasinakunte =

Village in Karnataka, India

- village
- Location in Karnataka, India Arasinakunte (India)
- Coordinates: 13.07493385819401°N 77.42111791460226°E
- Country: India
- State: Karnataka
- District: Bengaluru North
- Taluks: Nelamangala

Government
  - Body: Nelamangala Poursabha

Languages
  - Official: Kannada
- Time zone: UTC+5:30 (IST)
- Postal code: 562123
- Nearest city: Bengaluru
- Civic agency: Village Panchayat

Arasinakunte (also known as Arisinakunte) is a village in the southern state of Karnataka, India. It is located in the Nelamangala taluk of Bengaluru North district.

== Demographics ==
As per the 2011 India census, Arasinakunte had a population of 10,567 with 5,422 males and 5,145 females.

== Bus Route from Bengaluru City ==
Yeshwantapura - Darasahalli

== See also ==
- Bengaluru North district
- Districts of Karnataka
