= Hosur railway station =

Railway station in Tamil Nadu, India

Hosur Oosur
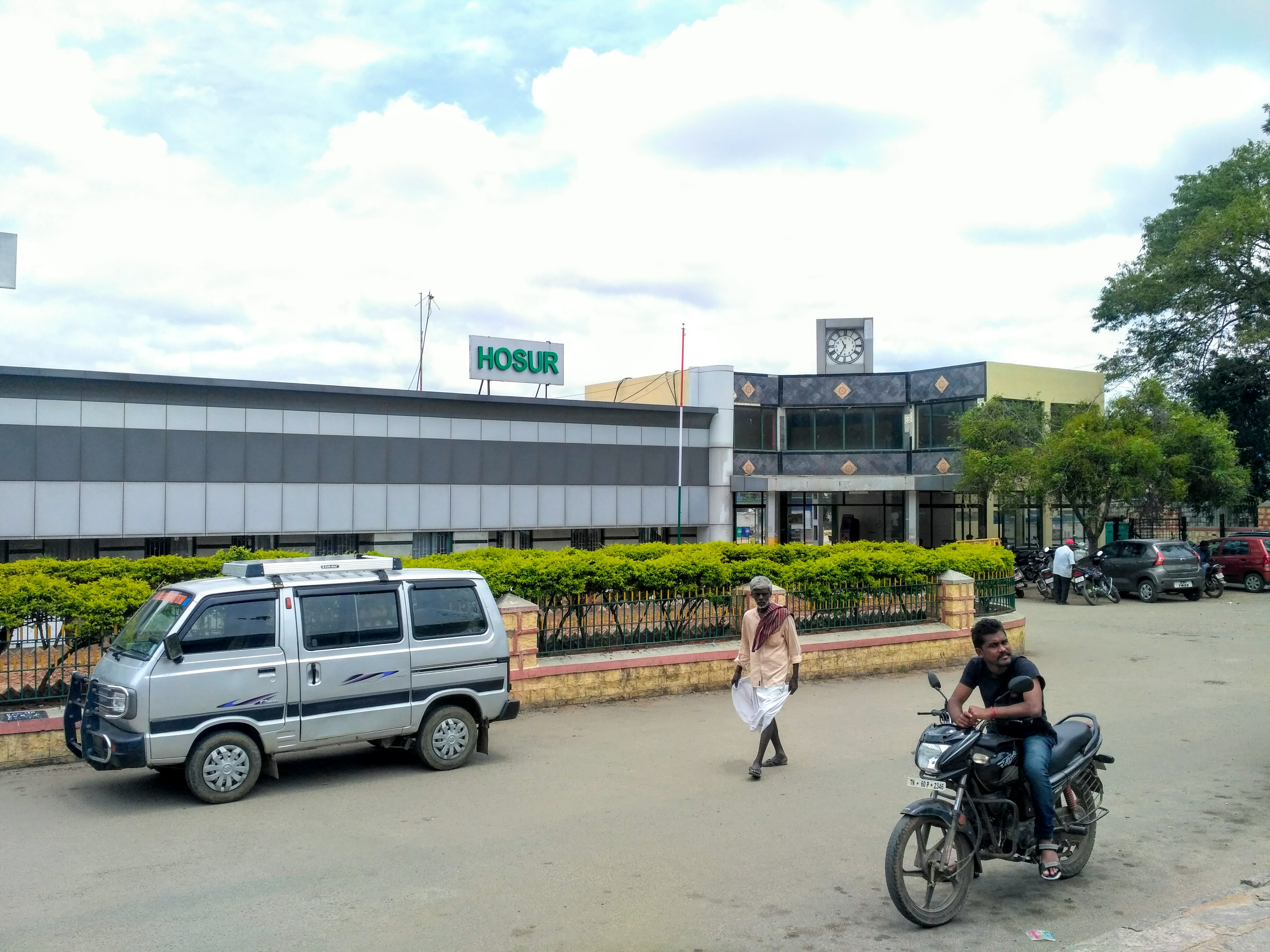
- Hosur railway station (HSRA)

General information
- Location: Railway station Road, Hosur, Tamil Nadu; India
- Coordinates: 12.7184°N 77.8229°E
- Elevation: 895 metres (2,936 ft)
- System: Indian Railways station
- Owner: South Western Railway zone of the Indian Railways
- Line: Salem–Bangalore line via Dharmapuri
- Platforms: 3
- Tracks: 4
- Connections: Auto rickshaw stand, Taxi stand

Construction
- Structure type: Standard (on ground station)
- Parking: Yes
- Accessible: Disabled access

Other information
- Status: Functioning
- Station code: HSRA
- Zone(s): South Western Railway
- Division(s): Bangalore
Route map
Location
- Location within Tamil Nadu Location within India

Hosur railway station (station code: HSRA) is a railway station serving Hosur. It is situated in the central part of the Hosur city.

== Administration ==
It is one of the stations in the Bangalore railway division currently administered by the South Western Railway zone, one of the important zones within the Indian Railways. It is officially also known by its code: HSRA.

== History ==
During the British regime, it was a terminal station connecting Tirupattur in the narrow gauge system running via Krishnagiri, another major business centre in those old golden days. After World War II, the railway line was dismantled. Then the line was further extended to Dharmapuri via Palacode. And the line was further extended to Bangalore 20 years ago. Now it is one of the major stops in Bangalore–Dharmapuri BG line.

== Projects and development ==
It is one of the 73 stations in Tamil Nadu to be named for upgradation under Amrit Bharat Station Scheme of Indian Railways.
