= Makalidurga =

Hill fort in India

Coordinates: 13.432604°N 77.50096°E

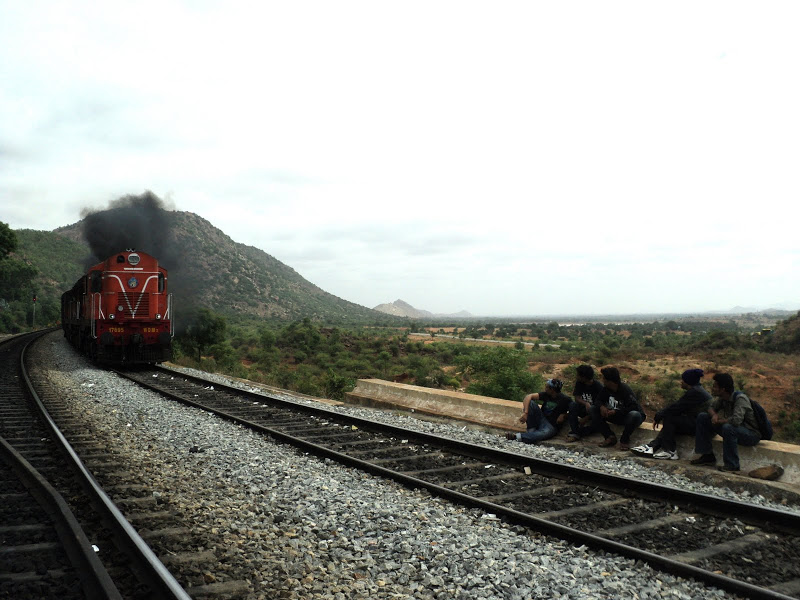
Railway track

Railway Station

Makalidurga is a hill fort situated near the village of the same name. It is 60 km north of Bangalore and 10 km after Doddaballapura on the way to Gauribidanur. The fort at the summit has an old temple of Shiva with Nandi and in legend Markandeya Rishi performed penance here.

Makalidurga Fort stands at the top of a huge granite hillock, huddled up amidst the chains of hills, formed like a valley close to Ghati Subramanya, a well-known pilgrimage center. It has a fort on top, at a height of 1,117 m.

It has become a popular trekking destination for adventurers, both day and night.

== Trekking ==
The Makalidurga trek is the nearest railway trek to Bangalore. It begins with a 2-km walk on the railway track from the station of Makalidurga. One can also ride bikes to the beginning of the trekking trail as well. A lot of refreshments is advised to be carried in case one wants to trek this hillock.

Makalidurga trek is of a medium/difficult level. The total trek route is 4 km in length, which should take approximately 3 hours to complete. There is a parking space created for vehicles in the base of the hill. One has to just cross the railway track and turn left. There is a small temple and some houses at the base of the trek. It is where the trek starts. The trek is managed by Karnataka Tourism department and one needs to make a prior booking on their official website, which charges a sum of ₹250 Indian rupees per adult. Karnataka Tourism provides a guide and local support for the charge. There is a public notice by Karnataka Forest Department as follows: "Makali hills comes under Makali Reserve Forest. This place is under the supervision of Doddaballapur forest department. Illegal trekking is prohibited, which is an offence under Section 24(C)II of Karnataka Forest Act-1963. Strictly illegal trekking is restricted. But on the public and trekkers demand, department provided the facility for trekking through online booking in website. Night trekking not allowed. Morning 0600am to 0500pm only." Also, after a few meters, one can find an open ground with a view of the mountain. Turning right, would lead one to the trek path with markings all around. There are fort ruins and a temple at the top.

== Gallery ==
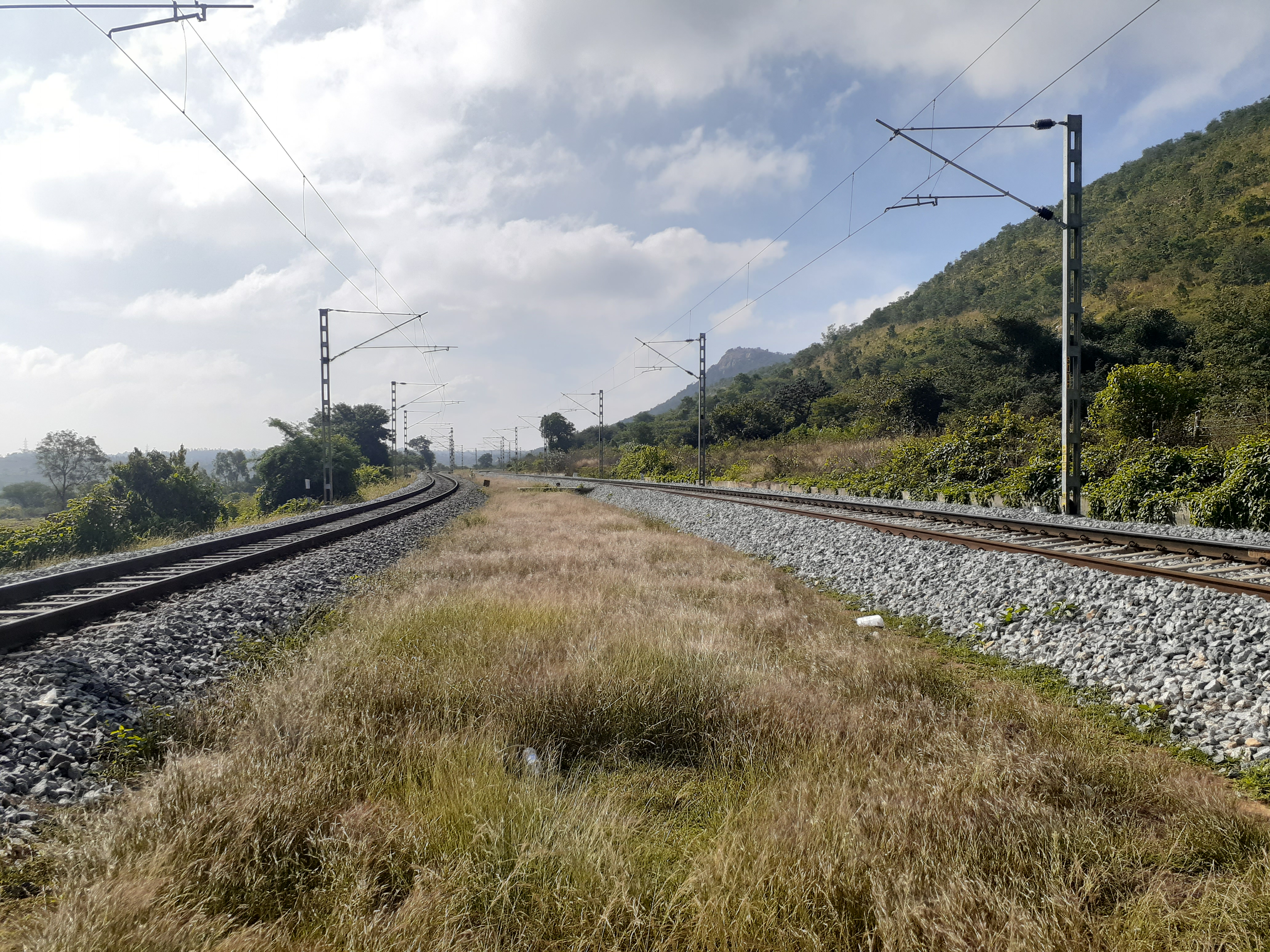
Makalidurga Railway Track

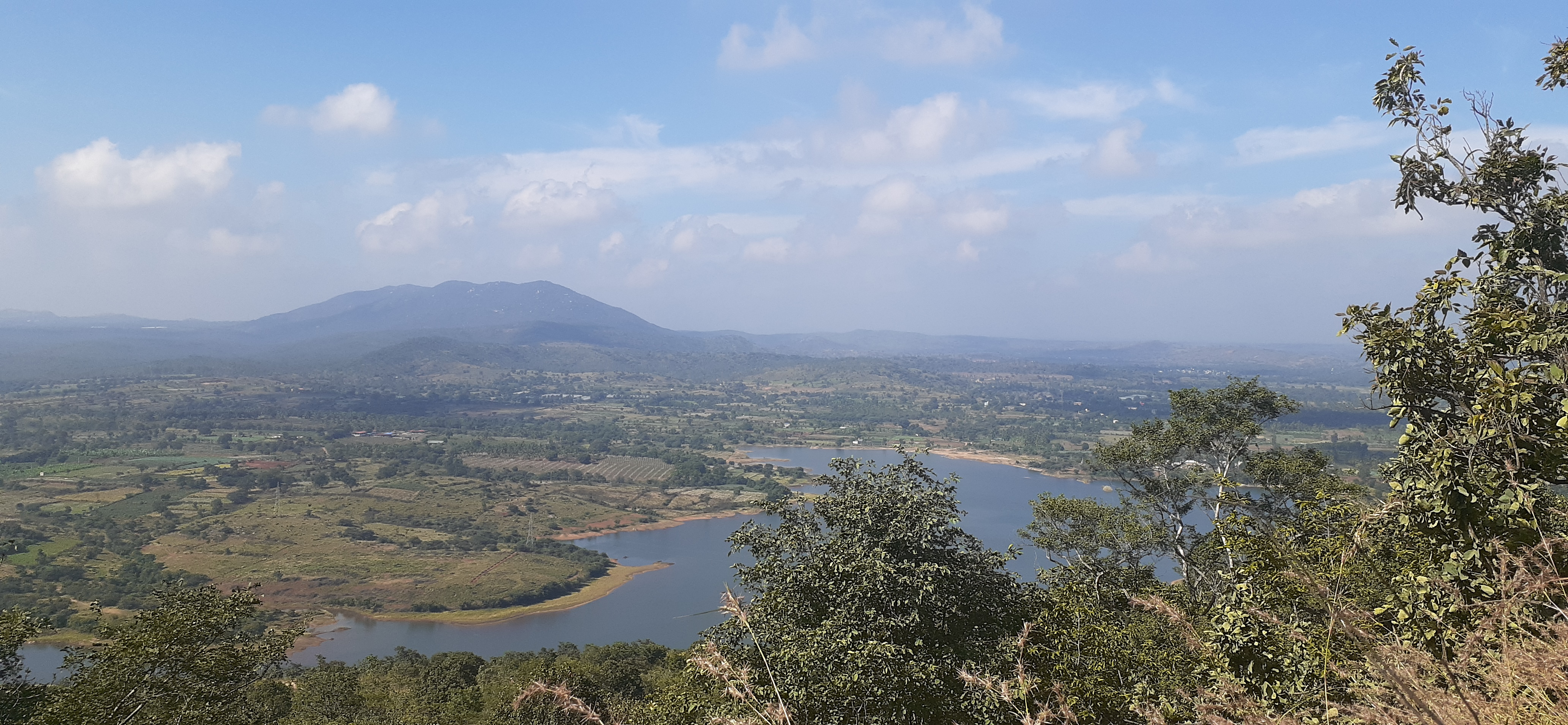
View from Trail

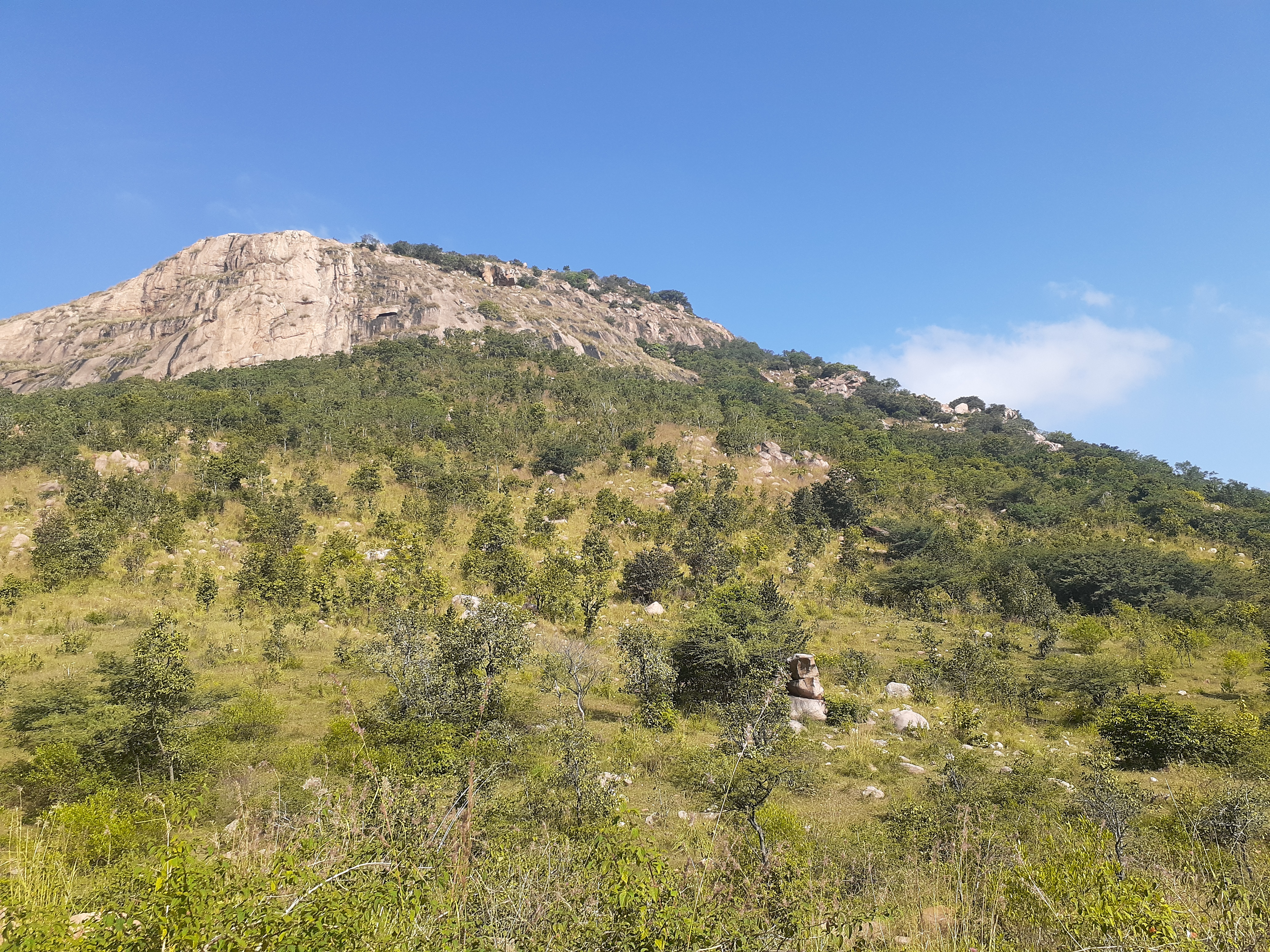
Makalidurga Hill

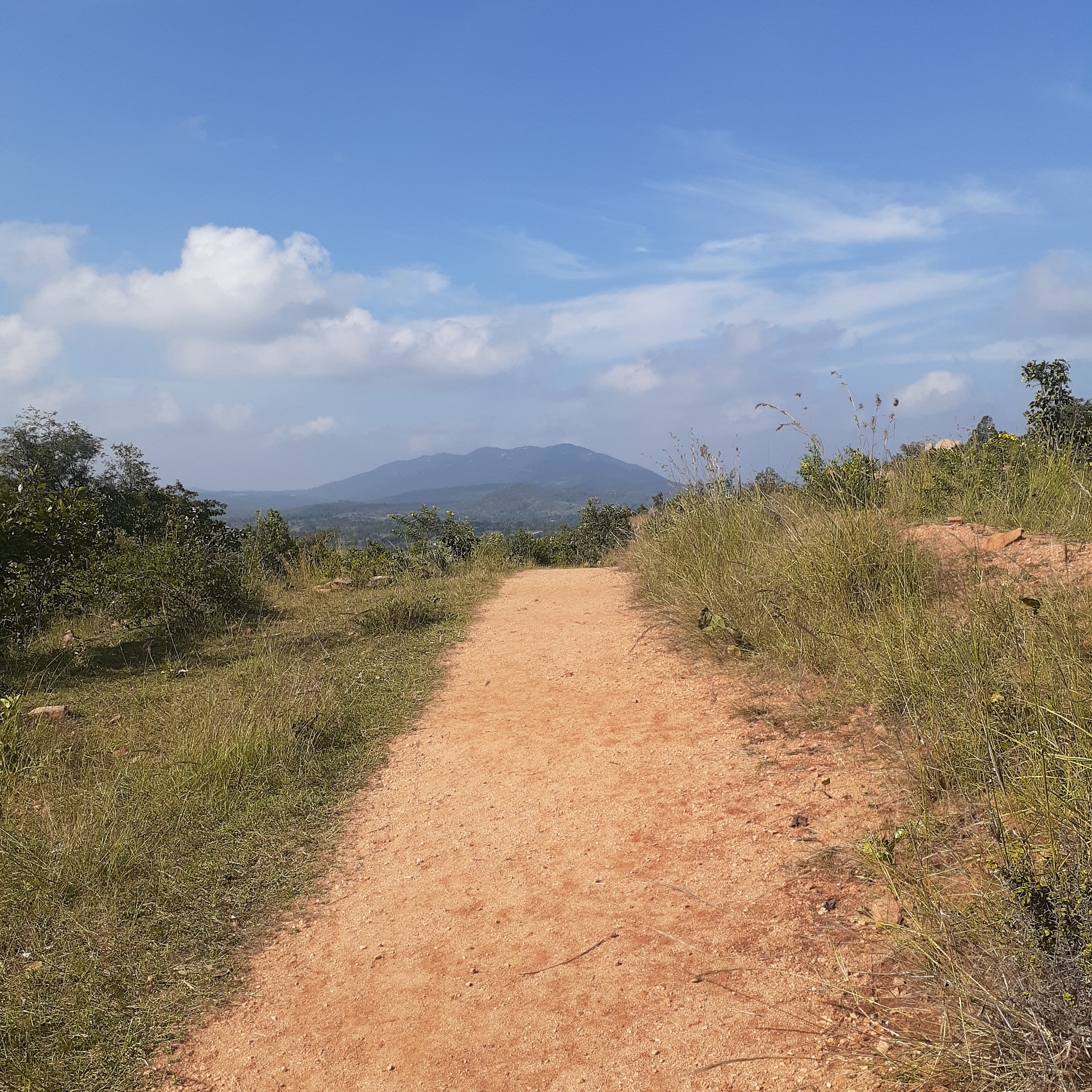
Trek Route
