= Makenahalli =

- village
- Location in Karnataka, India Makenahalli (India)
- Coordinates: 13.2973682°N 77.2376414°E
- Country: India
- State: Karnataka
- District: Bengaluru North
- Taluks: Nelamangala

Government
  - Body: Nelamangala Poursabha

Languages
  - Official: Kannada
- Time zone: UTC+5:30 (IST)
- Postal code: 562111
- Nearest city: Bengaluru
- Civic agency: Village Panchayat

Makenahalli is a village in the southern state of Karnataka, India. It is located in the Nelamangala taluk of Bengaluru North district.

== Demographics ==
Makenahalli had population of 595 of which 315 are males while 280 are females as per report released by Census India 2011.

== Geography ==
The total geographical area of village is 458.76 hectares.

== Bus Route from Bengaluru City ==
Yeshwantapura - Darasahalli - Nelamangala

== See also ==
- Halenahalli
- Districts of Karnataka
