= Adihosahalli =

- village
- Adihosahalli is in Bengaluru North district
- Interactive map of Adihosahalli
- Coordinates: 13.2525°N 77.3209°E
- Country: India
- State: Karnataka
- District: Bengaluru North
- Talukas: Nelamangala

Government
  - Body: Village Panchayat

Languages
  - Official: Kannada
- Time zone: UTC+5:30 (IST)
- Nearest city: Bengaluru North
- Civic agency: Village Panchayat

Adihosahalli is a village in the southern state of Karnataka, India in the Nelamangala taluk of Bengaluru North district.

== See also ==
- Bengaluru North district
- Districts of Karnataka
