= Dobbspet railway station =

Railway station in Karnataka

Dobbspet

General information
- Location: Halenijagal, Bengaluru North district, Karnatak; India
- Coordinates: 13°13′59″N 77°14′57″E
- Elevation: 921 metres (3,022 ft)
- System: Indian Railways station
- Owner: Indian Railways
- Operator: South Western Railway
- Line: Bangalore–Arsikere–Hubli line
- Platforms: 2
- Tracks: Double Electric-Line

Construction
- Structure type: Standard (on ground)

Other information
- Status: Functioning
- Station code: DBS
- Zone(s): South Western Railway
- Division(s): Bangalore

Services
Preceding station	Indian Railways	Following station
Nidvanda towards ?	South Western Railway zone Bangalore–Arsikere–Hubli line	Hirehalli towards ?
Location
- Interactive map

Dobbspet railway station is a railway station in located on Bangalore–Arsikere–Hubli railway line operated by the South Western Railway zone under Bangalore railway division. It is situated at Halenijagal in Bengaluru North district in the Indian state of Karnatak.
