= Channohalli =

- Village
- Location in Karnataka, India Channohalli (India)
- Coordinates: 13.2596776°N 77.2476997°E
- Country: India
- State: Karnataka
- District: Bengaluru North
- Taluks: Nelamangala

Government
  - Body: Nelamangala Poursabha

Languages
  - Official: Kannada
- Time zone: UTC+5:30 (IST)
- Postal code: 562127
- Nearest city: Bengaluru
- Civic agency: Village Panchayat

Channohalli is a village in the southern state of Karnataka, India. It is located in the Nelamangala taluk of Bengaluru North district.

== Demographics ==
Channohalli had population of 222 of which 108 are males while 114 are females as per report released by Census India 2011.

== Geography ==
The total geographical area of village is 83.35 hectares.

== Bus route from Bengaluru City ==
Yeshwantapura - Nelamangala - Dabbaspete

== See also ==
- Nijagal Kempohalli
- Bengaluru North district
