= Dodbele railway station =

Railway station in Karnataka

General information
- Location: Tadasigatta, Bengaluru North district, Karnatak; India
- Coordinates: 13°12′59″N 77°21′04″E
- Elevation: 907 metres (2,976 ft)
- System: Indian Railways station
- Owner: Indian Railways
- Operator: South Western Railway
- Line: Bangalore–Arsikere–Hubli line
- Platforms: 3
- Tracks: Double Electric-Line

Construction
- Structure type: Standard (on ground)

Other information
- Status: Functioning
- Station code: DBL
- Zone(s): South Western Railway
- Division(s): Bangalore

Services
Preceding station	Indian Railways	Following station
Bhairanayakanahalli towards ?	South Western Railway zone Bangalore–Arsikere–Hubli line	Muddalinganahalli Halt towards ?
Location
- Interactive map

Dodbele railway station is a railway station in located on Bangalore–Arsikere–Hubli railway line operated by the South Western Railway zone under Bangalore railway division. It is situated at Tadasigatta in Bengaluru North district in the Indian state of Karnatak.
