= Hulikunte =

- Grama Panchayat
- Nickname: Bete Hulikuknte
- Location in Karnataka, India
- Coordinates: 13.276°N 77.351°E
- Country: India
- State: Karnataka
- District: Bengaluru North
- Elevation: 880 m (2,890 ft)

Languages
  - Official: Kannada
- Time zone: UTC+5:30 (IST)
- PIN: 561 203
- Telephone code: 08119
- Vehicle registration: KA-43
- Website: panchamitra.kar.nic.in

Hulikunte is a village in Doddaballapura Taluk in Bengaluru North district of Karnataka state, India. Hulikunte is located between Nelmangala and Doddaballapura. Hulikunte is also known as (Hunting) "Bete Hulikunte" because of "Bete Ranganatha Swamy" Temple here.

== Bete Ranganatha Swamy Teample ==
Hulikunte is a hamlet in Doddaballapura taluk. Residents here explain that the symbolic game of hunting is being played here ever since the time of the Cholas. The Ranganathaswamy temple deity is called Bete Ranganatha (Bete: hunting in Kannada). Even today, residents finish the ritual of hunting and perform pooja at the temple. The ritual is performed at a time when the crops are harvested and grains stored in the fields before they are brought home. It appears that the hunting ritual originated when villagers would kill game that would come in search of the grains stored in the fields. There are small stretches of forested land in and around Hulikunte, and game like rabbits are known to stray into the villages. Villagers might have taken to hunting them, and today, the ritual remains, though no hunting actually takes place. Hulikunte residents take out the ancient weapons their ancestors used and march into the forest. Later, a local fair is held, and a festive atmosphere prevails in the village.

== Government offices ==
- Grama Pancyat Office, Hulikunte
- Grama Pancyat library, Hulikunte
- Village Accountant Office, Hulikunte
- Village Register's Office, Hulikunte
- BSNL Telephone Exchange Office, Hulikunte

== Schools ==
- Govt Higher Primary School, Hulikunte
- Government High School, Hulikunte
- Govt lower Primary School, Hulikunte colony
- Govt Higher Primary School, Katti Hosahalli
- Govt lower Primary School, Ambalagere
- Govt lower Primary School, Kasagatta
- Govt lower Primary School, Dyavasandra
- Govt lower Primary School, ChannaBasayyanaPalya
- Govt lower Primary School, Tabaranahalli
- Govt lower Primary School, Tubakunte
- Govt lower Primary School, MariHeggayyanaPalya
- Govt lower Primary School, Tuttugadahalli
- Govt lower Primary School, SeegePalya
- Govt lower Primary School, Appakaranahalli
- Govt lower Primary School, HunasePalya

== Hospital ==
- Primary Health Centre, Hulikunte

== Veterinary hospitals ==
- Govt Veterinary Hospital, Hulikunte
- Govt Veterinary Hospital, Ambalagere

== Co-operative societies ==
- Hulikunte Milk Producers' Co-operative Society Limited
- Hulikunte Agriculture Services Co-operative Society Limited
- Kasagatta Milk Producers' Co-operative Society Limited
- Katti Hosahalli Milk Producers' Co-operative Society Limited
