= Karimanne =

- village
- Location in Karnataka, India Karimanne (India)
- Coordinates: 13.2550344°N 77.2678137°E
- Country: India
- State: Karnataka
- District: Bengaluru North
- Taluks: Nelamangala

Government
  - Body: Nelamangala Poursabha

Languages
  - Official: Kannada
- Time zone: UTC+5:30 (IST)
- Postal code: 562111
- Nearest city: Bengaluru
- Civic agency: Village Panchayat

Karimanne is a village in the southern state of Karnataka, India. It is located in the Nelamangala taluk of Bengaluru North district.

== Demographics ==
Karimanne had population of 451 of which 211 are males while 240 are females as per report released by Census India 2011.

== Geography ==
The total geographical area of village is 215.06 hectares.

== Bus route from Bengaluru City ==
Yeshwantapura - Nelamangala - Dabaspete

== See also ==
- Channohalli
- Bengaluru North district
