= Sri Subamanya Ghati =

Sri Subamanya Ghati S S Ghati
- Grama Panchayat
- Nickname: Ghati
- Location in Karnataka, India
- Coordinates: 13.408529°N 77.528600°E
- Country: India
- State: Karnataka
- District: Bengaluru North

Languages
  - Official: Kannada

Languages
- Time zone: UTC+5:30 (IST)
- PIN: 561203
- Telephone code: 08119
- Vehicle registration: KA-43

Sri Subamanya Ghati, also written Ghati Subramanya, is a village in Doddaballapura Taluk in Bengaluru North district of Karnataka State, India. It belongs to Bangalore division. It is located 17 kilometres (11 mi) from Doddaballapura and 60 kilometres (37 mi) from the State capital Bangalore.

== Government offices ==
- S.S.Ghati Post Office(561203)
- S.S.Ghati VA Circle (Revenue Department Karnataka)
- S.S.Ghati Primary Health Center
- S.S.Ghati Police Station
- Telephone Exchange office
- Grama Panchayat Office
- S.S.Ghati Grama Panchayat Library
- Government Higher Primary School
- Anganwadi Kendra
- S.S.Ghati Grama Panchayat Loka Shikhana Samiti (Citizen literacy center)

== Banks ==
- Indian Overseas Bank
- Canara Bank
- S.S.Ghati Vyavasaya Seva Sahakara Sanga (Primary Agricultural Credit Society)
