= Bashettihalli =

- Suburb
- Location in Karnataka, India
- Coordinates: 13.260°N 77.553°E
- Country: India
- State: Karnataka
- District: Bengaluru North
- Elevation: 880 m (2,890 ft)

Population (2011)
  - Total: 12,000

Languages
  - Official: Kannada
- Time zone: UTC+5:30 (IST)
- PIN: 561 203
- Telephone code: 08119
- Vehicle registration: KA-43

Bashettihalli is a suburb of Doddaballapura in the state of Karnataka, originally envisaged as an industrial town of Doddaballapur city The latitude 12.9779204 and longitude 77.5687766 are the geocoordinate of the Bashettihalli. There is a similar-sounding village Bashattihalli in Sidlaghatta taluk.

== Modern Bashettihalli ==
It was a Grama Panchayat. State Highway 9 (Bangalore - Hindupur) passes through Bashettihalli.

== Schools ==
- Jawahar Navodaya Vidyalaya
- Govt High School
- Nikhila Lower Primary School
- Govt Higher Primary School
- St. Pauls Public School

== Banks ==
1. State bank of India. Bashettihalli Industrial Estate Branch
2. State bank of India. Apparel Park Branch
3. State bank of Mysore. Bashettihalli Branch
4. Indian Overseas Bank. Bashettihalli Branch
5. Bashettihalli Vyavasaya Seva Sahakara Sanga.
6. Customer service point FINO payments bank (money transfer)
