= Agasarahalli (Hosakote) =

- village
- Agasarahalli (Nelamangala) is in Bengaluru North district
- Interactive map of Agasarahalli
- Coordinates: 13.1335°N 77.3348°E
- Country: India
- State: Karnataka
- District: Bengaluru North district
- Talukas: Nelamangala

Government
  - Body: Village Panchayat

Languages
  - Official: Kannada
- Time zone: UTC+5:30 (IST)
- Postal code: 562123
- Nearest city: Bengaluru North
- Civic agency: Village Panchayat

Agasarahalli is a village in the southern state of Karnataka, India. It is located in the Nelamangala taluk of Bengaluru North district in Karnataka.

== See also ==
- Bengaluru North district
- Districts of Karnataka
