= Karepura =

- Village
- Location in Karnataka, India
- Coordinates: 13.292°N 77.543°E
- Country: India
- State: Karnataka
- District: Bengaluru North
- Elevation: 880 m (2,890 ft)

Population (2001)
  - Total: 540

Languages
  - Official: Kannada
- Time zone: UTC+5:30 (IST)
- Telephone code: 08194

Karepura is a village in Bengaluru North district in the state of Karnataka, India.

== Demographics ==
As of 2001 India census, Karepura had a population of 540. Males constitute 49% of the population and females 51%.

Karepua is about 26 km from Doddaballapur and around 60 km From Bangalore towards North East on Bangalore-Pune state highway (NH-7).

Karepura receives scanty rainfall compared to other cachement areas in Karnataka.

There is a temples in this village of Lord Hanuman. Every year Ramotsava is held in the village in the month of April where lot people of the village gather to offer prayers. Karepua has a Government school.
