= OSAT =

OSAT may refer to:

- Open-source appropriate technology
- Outsource semiconductor assembly and test, see Semiconductor consolidation

== See also ==
- Osat, in Bosnia and Herzegovina
- One School at a Time (OSAAT)
