= Agasarahalli, Nelamangala =

Agasarahalli
- village
- Agasarahalli (Nelamangala) is in Bengaluru North district
- Interactive map of Agasarahalli
- Coordinates: 13.1532°N 77.9408°E
- Country: India
- State: Karnataka
- District: Bengaluru North
- Talukas: Nelamangala

Government
  - Body: Village Panchayat

Languages
  - Official: Kannada
- Time zone: UTC+5:30 (IST)
- Nearest city: Bengaluru North
- Civic agency: Village Panchayat

Agasarahalli is a village in the southern part of India, Karnataka. It is located in the Nelamangala taluk of Bengaluru North district in Karnataka. The Agasarahalli village had population of 263 of which 128 are males while 135 are females as per Population Census 2011.

== See also ==
- Bengaluru North district
- Districts of Karnataka
