= Ghati Subramanya =

Famous Temple in Karnataka, India

Coordinates: 13.40856°N 77.52856°E

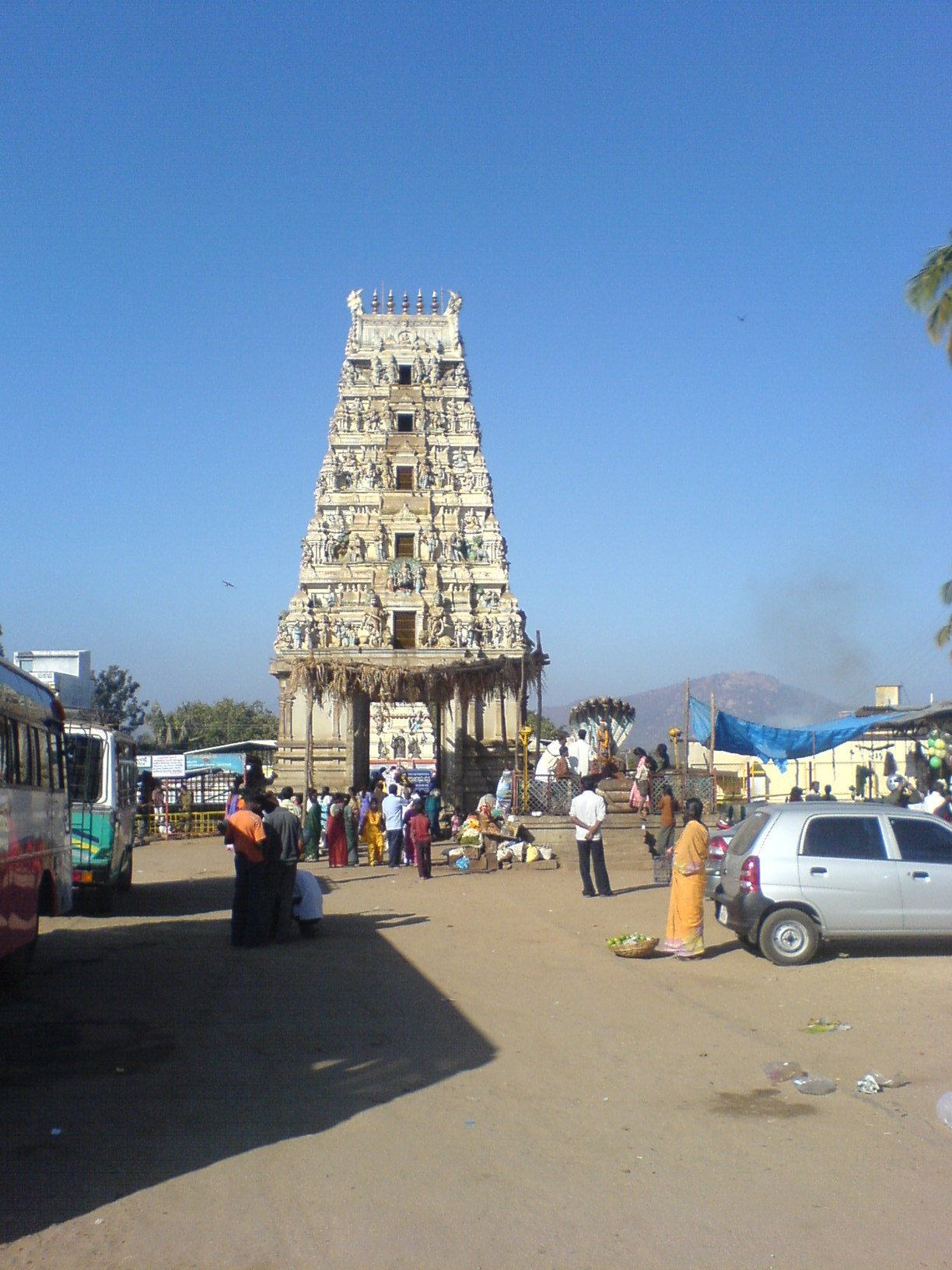
- Ghati Subramanya Temple

Religion
- Affiliation: Hinduism
- District: Bengaluru North
- Deity: Subramanya

Location
- Location: Doddaballapura
- State: Karnataka
- Country: India
- Interactive map of Ghati Subramanya

Ghati Subramanya (Kannada: ಘಾಟಿ ಸುಬ್ರಮಣ್ಯ) is a Hindu temple, situated in the village of Sri Subamanya Ghati near Tubagere, Doddaballapura, Karnataka, India. It is 60 km from the city of Bangalore and is a popular pilgrimage centre. The uniqueness of this temple is that the prime deity Lord Karthikeya, is found together with Lord Narasimha. According to mythology, both idols are believed to have emerged from the earth. It is also an important centre in South India for worship of the Hindu deity Kethu. Special rituals are performed during Brahmarathotsava on the day of Pushya shudda Shashti. Narasimha Jayanti is the other major festival celebrated here.

== History ==
Ghati Subramanya has a recorded history of more than 600 years. It was first developed by the Ghorpade rulers of Sandur who ruled parts of Bellary.

== Tradition ==
It is the belief of devotees that childless couples making vows (ಹರಕೆ) shall be blessed with children by the lord. A related ritual is that of installing idols of snakes (ನಾಗರ ಹಾವು). One can see thousands of such idols near the temple.

== Design ==
The idol of Kartikeya with a seven headed cobra is swyambu (emerged from Earth on its own including the shape etc,.) On the rear side is Lord Narasimha. It faces eastwards while the idol of Lord Narasimha faces westwards. To ensure that both deities are visible to devotees at the same time, a huge mirror was placed in the rear in the sanctum sanctorum.

== Cattle fair ==
The fair held here in December is very famous and farmers from neighboring states of Tamil Nadu, Andhra Pradesh, Kerala, Maharashtra as well as from many parts of Karnataka participate in the cattle fair.
