= Kelamangalam railway station =

Railway station in Tamil Nadu, India

Kelemangalam Railway Station
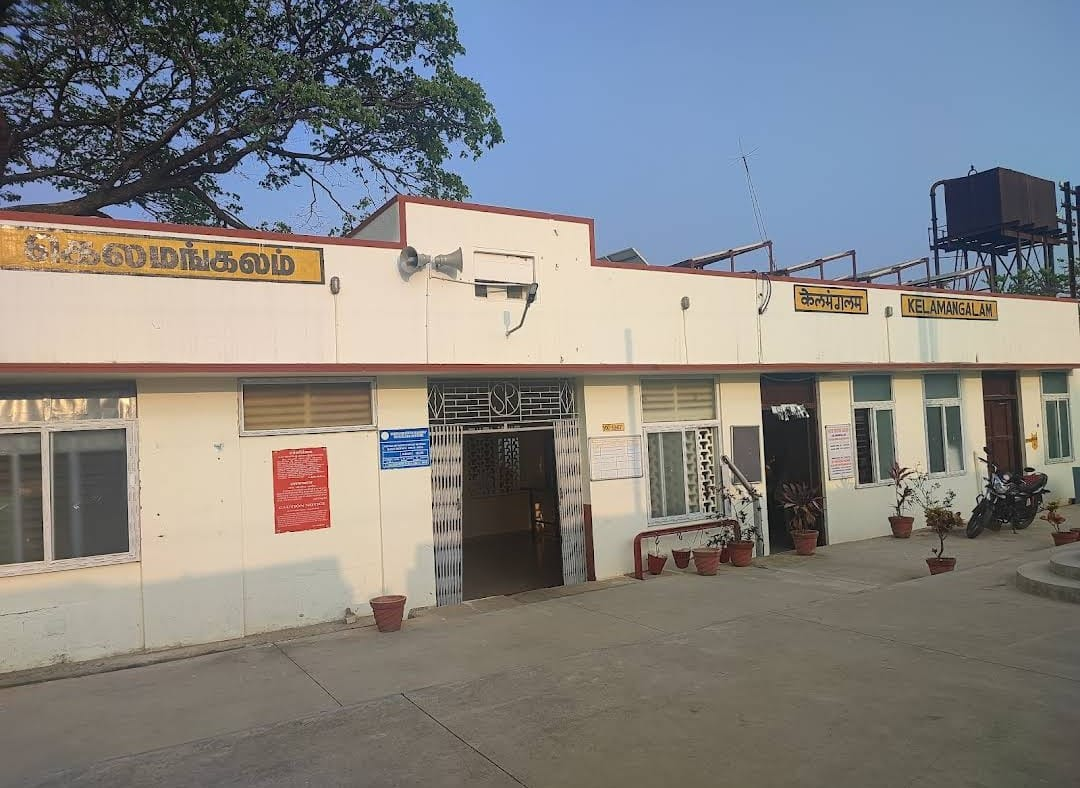

General information
- Location: Krishnagiri district, Tamil Nadu; India
- Coordinates: 12.6155°N 77.8653°E
- Elevation: 804 metres (2,638 ft)
- System: Indian Railways station
- Owner: South Western Railway zone of the Indian Railways
- Line: Salem–Bangalore line via Dharmapuri
- Platforms: 2

Construction
- Structure type: Standard (on ground station)
- Parking: Yes

Other information
- Status: Functioning
- Station code: KMLM
- Zone(s): South Western Railway Zone
- Division(s): Bangalore
Location

Kelamangalam railway station is one of the intermediate railway stations between Hosur railway station and Dharmapuri railway station.

== Railway station ==
Kelamangalam railway station is located in Krishnagiri district of Tamil Nadu on Salem junction railway station to Bangalore city junction railway station line. This railway line is non-electrified single line, so many level crosses occur between passenger trains and express trains in the station. The Kelamangalam railway station is fifteen kilometres from Hosur railway station. Kelamangalam railway station is one of the intermediate railway station in Bengaluru to Salem line. This is a Passenger trains stoppage railway station. It belongs to South Western Railway, Bangalore Cy Jn. Neighbouring stations are Periyanaga Thumai, Hosur. A nearby major railway station is Bangalore Cy Jn and Airport is Bengaluru International Airport. Total No express trains stop at this station.

== Tourist places ==
Tourist places near by Kelamangalam are

- Bangalore
- Hogenakkal
- Savandurga
- Bheemeshwari
- MM Hills

== Impact on Locals ==
Around Kelamangalam village working people are using railways daily to commute to Hosur, Bengaluru and Dharmapuri by this passenger train transport. Small businesses and hawkers earn their living by selling vegetables, fruits and packaged food in these passenger trains.
