= Soldevanahalli railway station =

Railway station in Karnataka

Soldevanahalli

General information
- Location: Hesarghatta Main Road, Soldevanahalli, Bengaluru Urban district, Karnataka; India
- Coordinates: 13°05′29″N 77°29′25″E
- Elevation: 861 metres (2,825 ft)
- System: Indian Railways station
- Owner: Indian Railways
- Operator: South Western Railway
- Line: Bangalore–Arsikere–Hubli line
- Platforms: 3
- Tracks: Double Electric-Line

Construction
- Structure type: Standard (on ground)

Other information
- Status: Functioning
- Station code: SDVL
- Zone(s): South Western Railway
- Division(s): Bangalore

Services
Preceding station	Indian Railways	Following station
Chikka Banavara Junction towards ?	South Western Railway zone Bangalore–Arsikere–Hubli line	Golhalli towards ?
Location
- Interactive map

Soldevanahalli railway station is a railway station in located on Bangalore–Arsikere–Hubli railway line operated by the South Western Railway zone under Bangalore railway division. It is situated beside Hesarghatta Main Road, at Soldevanahalliat in Bengaluru Urban district in the Indian state of Karnatak.
