= Kyatsandra railway station =

Railway station in Karnataka

Kyatsandra

General information
- Location: State Highway 94, Tumkur, Tumakuru district, Karnatak; India
- Coordinates: 13°18′58″N 77°08′53″E
- Elevation: 841 metres (2,759 ft)
- System: Indian Railways station
- Owner: Indian Railways
- Operator: South Western Railway
- Line: Bangalore–Arsikere–Hubli line
- Platforms: 2
- Tracks: Double Electric-Line

Construction
- Structure type: Standard (on ground)

Other information
- Status: Functioning
- Station code: KIAT
- Zone(s): South Western Railway
- Division(s): Bangalore

Services
Preceding station	Indian Railways	Following station
Hirehalli towards ?	South Western Railway zone Bangalore–Arsikere–Hubli line	Tumkur towards ?
Location
- Interactive map

Kyatsandra railway station is a railway station in located on Bangalore–Arsikere–Hubli railway line operated by the South Western Railway zone under Bangalore railway division. It is situated beside State Highway 94 at Tumkur in Tumakuru district in the Indian state of Karnatak.
