= Abachikkanahalli =

- village
- Abachikkanahalli is in Bengaluru North district

- Location in Karnataka, India Abachikkanahalli (India)
- Coordinates: 14.3184985°N 75.7977247°E
- Country: India
- State: Karnataka
- District: Bengaluru North
- Talukas: Devanahalli

Government
  - Body: Village Panchayat

Languages
  - Official: Kannada
- Time zone: UTC+5:30 (IST)
- Nearest city: Bengaluru North
- Civic agency: Village Panchayat

Abachikkanahalli is a village in the southern state of Karnataka, India. It is located in the Devanahalli taluk of Bengaluru North district.

== Demographics ==
According to the 2011 census Abachikkanahalli had a population of 47 of which 24 were male and 23 female.

== See also ==
- Bengaluru North district
- Districts of Karnataka
