= Halenahalli =

- village
- Location in Karnataka, India Halenahalli (India)
- Coordinates: 13.2800982°N 77.2318934°E
- Country: India
- State: Karnataka
- District: Bangalore Rural
- Taluks: Nelamangala

Government
  - Body: Nelamangala Poursabha

Languages
  - Official: Kannada
- Time zone: UTC+5:30 (IST)
- Postal code: 562111
- Nearest city: Bangalore
- Civic agency: Village Panchayat

Halenahalli is a village in the southern state of Karnataka, India. It is located in the Nelamangala taluk of Bangalore Rural district.

== Demographics ==
Halenahalli had population of 864 of which 443 are males while 421 are females as per report released by Census India 2011.

== Geography ==
The total geographical area of village is 284.36 hectares.

== Bus route from Bengaluru City ==
Yeshwantapura - Darasahalli - Nelamangala

== See also ==
- Districts of Karnataka
