= Chikka Banavara Junction railway station =

Railway station in Karnataka, India

Chikka Banavara Junction
- Station Board (top); Front Entrance (bottom)

General information
- Other names: Chik Banavar Station
- Location: Geleyara Balaga Layout, Chikkabanavara, Bengaluru Urban district, Karnataka India; Bangalore
- Coordinates: 13°04′30″N 77°30′19″E
- Elevation: 877 metres (2,877 ft)
- System: Indian Railways station
- Owner: Indian Railways
- Operator: South Western Railway
- Line: Bangalore–Arsikere–Hubli line
- Platforms: 5
- Tracks: Double Electric-Line
- Connections: BMTC buses

Construction
- Structure type: At-grade

Other information
- Status: Functioning
- Station code: BAW
- Zone(s): South Western Railway
- Division(s): Bangalore
- Fare zone: South Western

Services
| Preceding station | Indian Railways | Following station |
|---|---|---|
| Yesvantpur Junction towards KSR Bengaluru | South Western Railway zone Bangalore–Arsikere–Hubli line | Soldevanahalli towards Arsikere Junction |
Location

Chikkabanavara Junction railway station (station code: BAW) is a railway station located on the Bangalore–Arsikere–Hubli railway line operated by the South Western Railway zone under the Bangalore railway division. it is situated at Geleyara Balaga Layout,Chikkabanavara in the Bengaluru Urban district of Karnataka.

== Other information ==
The station is also a part of the Mallige line connecting to Baiyyappanahalli under the Bengaluru Suburban Railway set to be operational by March 2027
