= Devanahalli pomelo =

Variety of citrus fruit

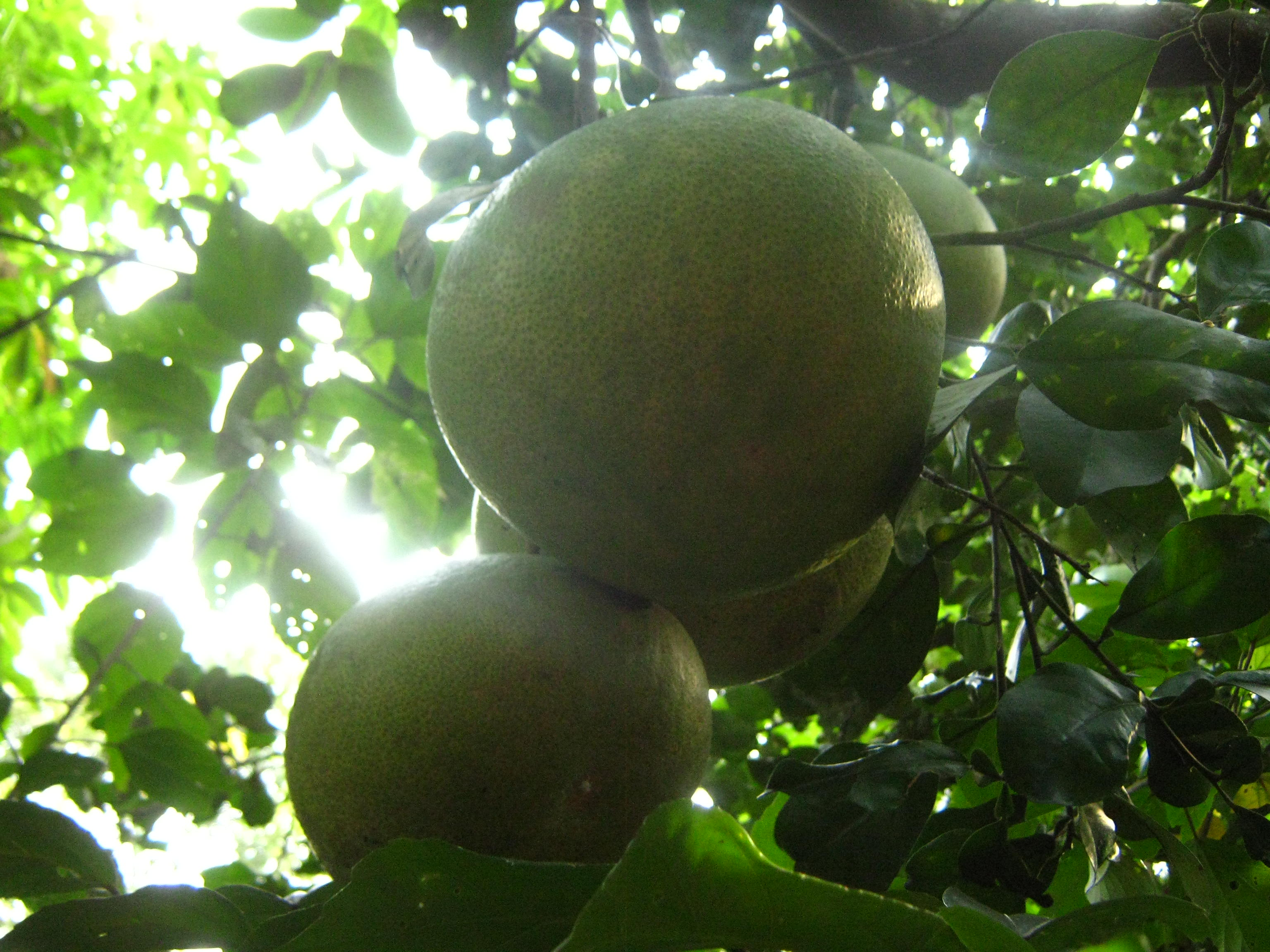
Pomelo

The Devanahalli pomelo (also called Devanahalli Pomello in official documents) is a variety of the citrus fruit pomelo (Citrus maxima) of the family Rutaceae. It is exclusively grown in the region around Devanahalli taluk, Bangalore Rural District, India, as an exotic crop variety. Its officially designated name is "Devanahalli Pomello (Chakkota)"; it is locally known as chakkota.

The Devanahalli pomelo is protected under the Geographical Indications of Goods (Registration & Protection) Act (GI Act) 1999 of the Government of India. It was registered by the Controller General of Patents, Designs, and Trademarks under the title "Devanahalli Pomello" and recorded at GI Application number 131 under Class 31 as a horticulture item. The fruit enjoys a strong market demand. Its sweet taste and flavour are considered to be better than those of other varieties in the market.

== Location ==
The fruit was initially grown in villages around Devanahalli taluk, including Beerasandra, Bidalur, Chanarayapatna, Kundana, Melinathotadahalli, Neelaganapalya, Neelaguntepalya, Raghunathapura, Rajathafarm, Shivanapura, Soopanahalli, and Vishwanathapura and some regions in India. These villages lie within the geographical range of 13°06′50″N 77°33′08″E and 13°21′36″N 77°50′21″E. After a large land acquisition to build the Kempegowda International Airport, the plant is now grown only in a few, non-contiguous villages.

== History ==
The pomelo tree shares ancestry with the grapefruit. The Devanahalli pomelo has a unique, sweet taste, unlike other local varieties which have a bitter taste. Five decades ago, this plant's special sweetness trait was compromised by natural crossbreeding with local varieties, and it was nearing extinction. A few old Devanahalli pomelo plants were identified in the area and then propagated widely, which preserved this variety.

This plant has faced a serious threat in recent years of near extinction due to construction of the Bengaluru International Airport at Devanahalli. The horticultural land on which the trees were growing was sold by farmers at high prices, and many Devanahalli pomelo trees were felled. The Department of Horticulture is collecting germ plasm of the fruit to preserve its novelty and promote cultivation. The Department of Horticulture also established a conservation biocentre at Hulimavu to assist in distributing plants to the remaining farmers. Alternative methods of grafting were also explored. Due to the special soil conditions at Devanahalli and its Geographical Indication (GI) status, the Devanahalli pomelo can not be planted in other places. The fruit has now made a comeback with the increasing demand, though there are now fewer than 100 farmers engaged in its cultivation.

Mahatma Gandhi is said to have tasted this fruit when offered one by a local farmer during his visit to Nandi Hills, a hill resort near to Devanahalli. According to said farmer, Gandhi liked its taste and suggested that the authorities conserve this variety.

== Characteristics ==
=== Conditions ===
Devanahalli is cool and has moderate humidity, producing agro-climatic weather conditions which are conducive to the growth of the Devanahalli pomelo. The soil is generally red soil consisting of gravel, loam, and clay with high drainage conditions, favourable for the growth of this tree. Rainfall in the area varies from 300–807 millimetres (11.8–31.8 inches) per year.

=== Trees and fruit ===
The tree grows with a twisted trunk of 10–20 cm thickness (3.9–7.9 in) to varying heights of 5–15 metres (16–49 ft). It has needles on the branchlets, aged limbs and trunk. Its leaves are large with petioles in the shape of wings, a dull green colour, and an elliptical or oblong egg shape. The flowers are sweet-smelling, and fruits are formed in globular, egg, or pear shapes, with the width varying from 10–30 centimetres (3.9–11.8 in). The colour of the juicy pulp is pink or red. Segments of the fruit are easy to remove. The outer skin of the fruit is a greenish-yellow colour. In matured fruit, the number of seeds varies from eight to ten. The fruit contains vitamin C and beta carotene.

=== Propagation ===
Propagation of the Devanahalli pomelo uses cuttings, grafts, and air layering. In a nursery in Devanahalli, grafting is done by an organic farming method which takes about three months, and about 400 saplings are marketed in a year. After fine tilling and kneading of the soil, the plant grafts are placed in pits measuring one meter on each side. The pit is filled with a blend of farm yard manure, top soil, and cake of neem and groundnut to a quarter of the depth of the pits and then watered. During the rainy season, fertilizers are added. Neem oil is also added as a pest control measure. It is irrigated when possible.

Flowering occurs twice a year during December/January and June/July. Fruits are grown for about 11 months, then picked in order to generate seedlings. Each tree yields an average of 300 to 400 fruits annually. The fruits typically weigh about 2 to 2.5 kg and can weigh up to 10 kg. They have a long shelf life of 45–60 days. Fruits are known by their distinguishing pink or red juicy carpels, which have a sweet and sour taste. Quality control is maintained by the Department of Forestry and Environmental Science of the University of Agriculture Sciences, Bangalore.

The fruit is directly edible and is also used to prepare desserts and jellies. Pomelo peel is also used in making cosmetics and Ayurvedic medicines.
