= Palakkodu railway station =

Railway station in Tamil Nadu, India

Palakkodu

General information
- Location: Palakkodu, Dharmapuri district, Tamil Nadu; India
- Coordinates: 12.2961°N 78.0718°E
- Elevation: 503 metres (1,650 ft)
- System: Regional rail, Light rail & Goods railway
- Owner: Indian Railways
- Operator: South Western Railway zone
- Line: Omalur–Dharmapuri–Bengaluru
- Platforms: 1
- Tracks: 2
- Connections: Auto rickshaw

Construction
- Structure type: Standard (on-ground station)
- Parking: Yes
- Accessible: Yes

Other information
- Status: Functioning
- Station code: PCV
- Zone(s): South Western Railway zone
- Division(s): Bangalore
- Fare zone: South Western Railway zone

History
- Electrified: Construction

Passengers
- More than 1000 per day
Location
- Location within Tamil Nadu Location within India

Palakkodu railway station is a railway station situated in Palakkodu, a panchayat town and taluk headquarters located in the Dharmapuri district of Tamil Nadu.

== Administration ==
It has been administered by the South Western Railway Zone, included in the Bangalore railway division that was transferred over from the Southern Railway zone.

== Location and layout ==
The station falls on the Dharmapuri–Hosur state highway section. It has one platform.

== Facilities ==
The station is equipped with a real-time online reservation facility. Many people warm up here during early mornings and evenings every day.
