= Nidavanda =

- village
- Location in Karnataka, India Nidavanda (India)
- Coordinates: 13.2355203°N 77.2735599°E
- Country: India
- State: Karnataka
- District: Bangalore Rural
- Taluks: Nelamangala

Government
  - Body: Nelamangala Poursabha

Languages
  - Official: Kannada
- Time zone: UTC+5:30 (IST)
- Postal code: 562111
- Nearest city: Bangalore
- Civic agency: Village Panchayat

Nidavanda is a village in the southern state of Karnataka, India. It is located in the Nelamangala taluk of Bangalore Rural district.

== Demographics ==
Nidavanda had population of 1,540 of which 799 are males while 741 are females as per report released by Census India 2011.

== Geography ==
The total geographical area of village is 450.22 hectares.

== Bus Route from Bengaluru City ==
Yeshwantapura - Nelamangala

== See also ==
- Karimanne
- Bengaluru Rural District
