= Bashattihalli =

Bashettahalli
- Village
- Location in Karnataka, India
- Coordinates: 13.530409°N 77.860313°E
- Country: India
- State: Karnataka
- District: Chikkaballapur

Population
  - Total: 2,000

Languages
  - Official: Kannada, Telugu
- Time zone: UTC+5:30 (IST)
- Postal code: 562105
- Telephone code: 08158
- Vehicle registration: 40
- Website: facebook.com/Bashattihalliofficial/

Bashettahalli is a village located in Sidlaghatta Taluk of Chikkaballapura district in the state of Karnataka, India. Bashattihalli is also gram panchayat. The population is estimated to c. 2000, and the main occupation is agriculture. There is a similar-sounding village, Bashettihalli in Doddaballapur taluk.

== Historical temples ==
There are three historical temples in Bashettahalli hobli.

- Sri Ramaligeswara Temple – This temple is located up on the mountain near Nallarallahalli, and belongs to Bashettahalli gram panchayat. It is nearly 5 km from Bashettahalli to the temple. The god Sri Ramalingewar's idol was placed by lord Sri rama in the period of Ramayana while Sri rama and goddess Sitha was returning from Sri Lanka after destroying Ravana. The temple was built by cholas.

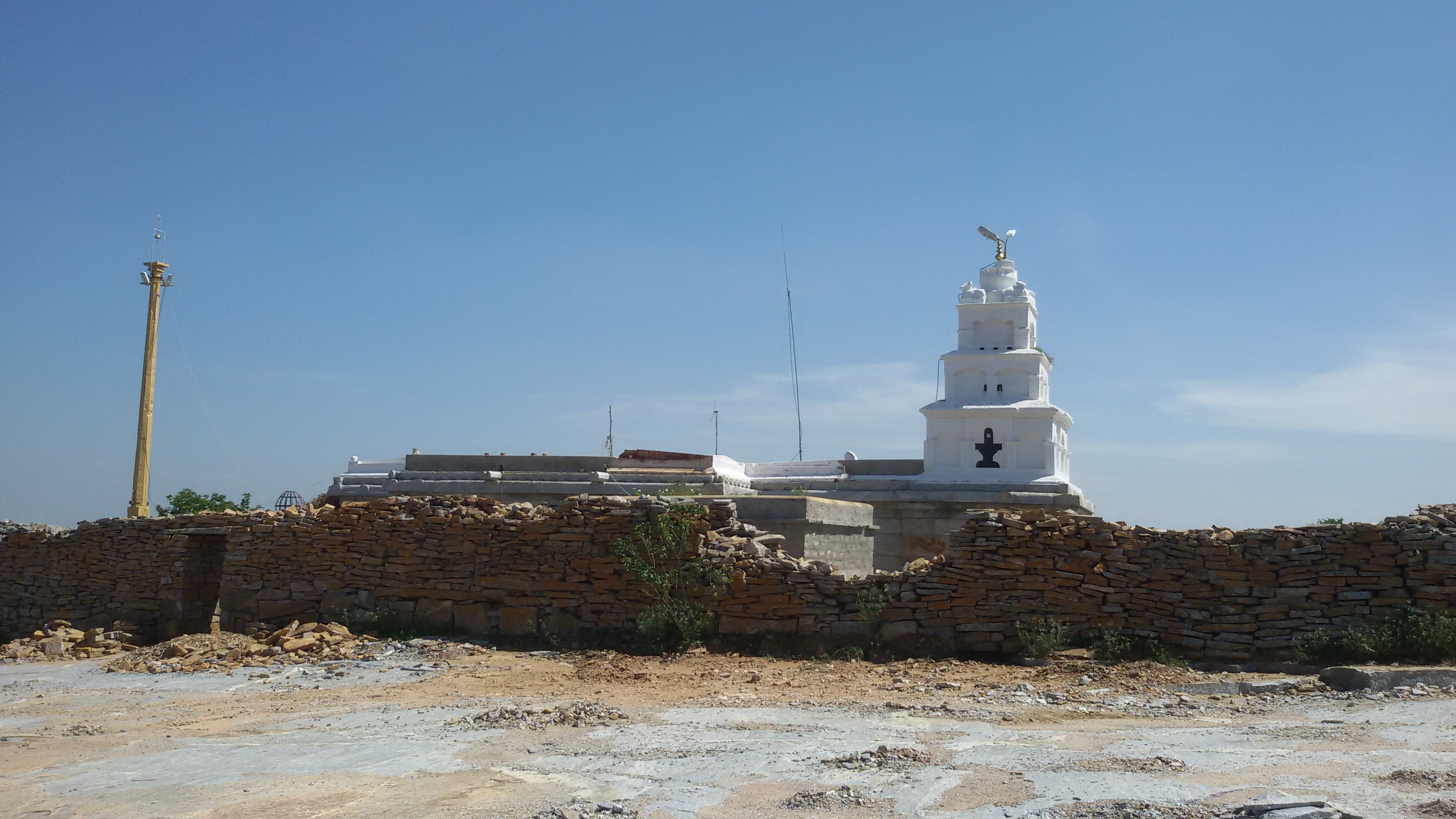
sri Ramaligeshwar Temple

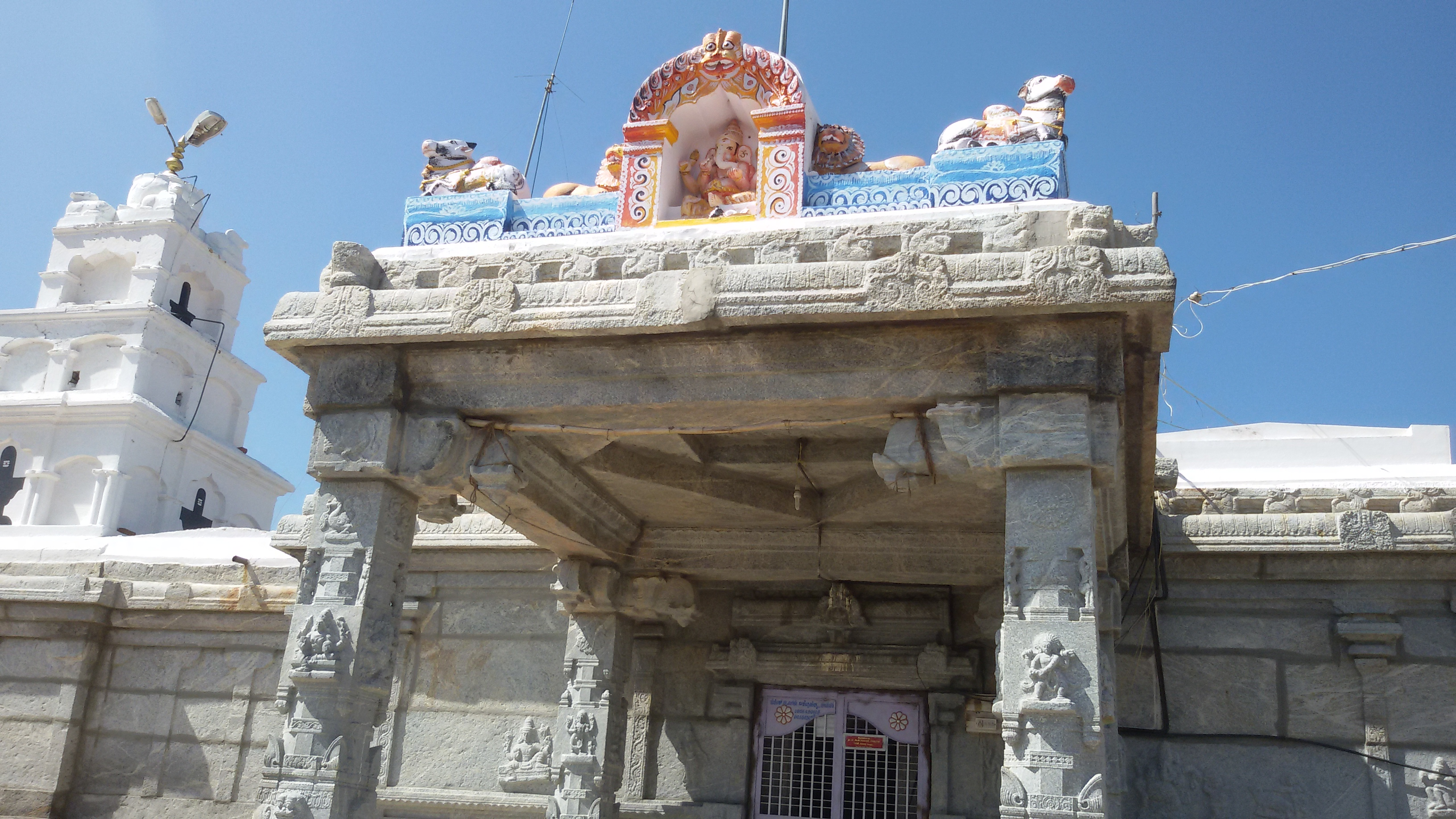
Sri Ramaligeshwara Temple

- Sri Chamundeswari Temple – This temple is located at Nallarallahalli. It belongs to Bashettahalli gram panchayat.

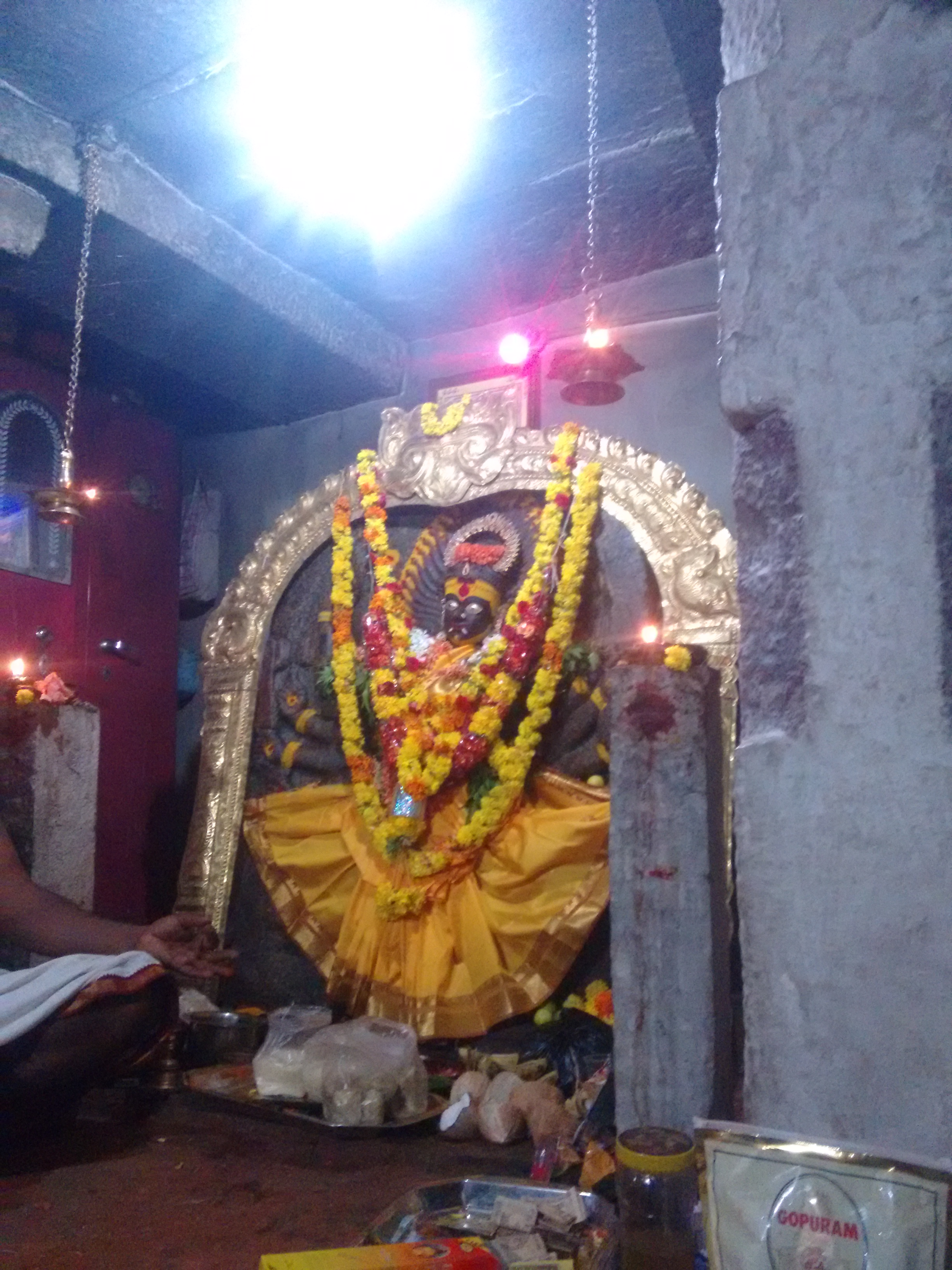
Sri chamundeswari

- Sri Anantha Padmanabha Temple – This temple is located in Odeyanakere, Ramenahalli, which come under Bashettahalli gram panchayat. This historical temple was built by cholas.

== Climate ==
The climate is dry and hot during summer. The average rainfall is 768 mm, which is slightly above the district's average rainfall. On average, it rains 45 days in a year.

== Facilities ==
Bashattihalli has all types of facilities.

- Government pu college – The college is located at Bashettahalli itself. The college is owned by state government.
- Government primary and high school – The school is owned by government of Karnataka, located in Bashettahalli itself.
- Pragathi Krishna Kramina Bank – The bank is located in Bashettahalli itself near B.R.Ambedkar bavan.
- Government hospital – Opp to Government primary school.
- Veterinary hospital – Near bus stop.
- Gram panchayat office (mandal office) – Near bus stop.

== Temples ==
- Gagamma temple
- Lord Shiva Temple
- Hanuman temple
- Sri Rama temple
