= Agalakote (Devanahalli) =

- village
- Agalakote (Devanahalli) is in Bengaluru North district
- Country: India
- State: Karnataka
- District: Bengaluru North
- Talukas: Devanahalli

Government
  - Body: Village Panchayat

Languages
  - Official: Kannada
- Time zone: UTC+5:30 (IST)
- Nearest city: Bengaluru North
- Civic agency: Village Panchayat

Agalakote is a village in the southern state of Karnataka, India. It is located in the Devanahalli taluk of Bengaluru North district in Karnataka.

== See also ==
- Bangalore Rural
- Districts of Karnataka
