= Dargajogihalli =

- town
- Location in Karnataka, India
- Coordinates: 13.3120200°N 77.526620°E
- Country: India
- State: Karnataka
- District: Bangalore Rural

Population (2001)
  - Total: 6,205

Languages
  - Official: Kannada
- Time zone: UTC+5:30 (IST)

Dargajogihalli is a census town in Bengaluru North district in the state of Karnataka, India.

== Demographics ==
As of 2001 India census"Census of India 2001: Data from the 2001 Census, including cities, villages and towns (Provisional)". Census Commission of India. Archived from the original on 16 June 2004., Dargajogihalli had a population of 6205. Males constitute 51% of the population and females 49%. Dargajogihalli has an average literacy rate of 64%, higher than the national average of 59.5%: male literacy is 71% and, female literacy is 58%. In Dargajogihalli, 15% of the population is under 6 years of age.
