= Agasarahalli (Hosadurga) =

- village
- Agasarahalli (Hosadurga) is in Chitradurga district
- Interactive map of Agasarahalli
- Coordinates: 13.8060°N 76.4568°E
- Country: India
- State: Karnataka
- District: Chitradurga
- Talukas: Hosadurga

Government
  - Body: Village Panchayat

Languages
  - Official: Kannada
- Time zone: UTC+5:30 (IST)
- Nearest city: Chitradurga
- Civic agency: Village Panchayat

Agasarahalli is a village in the southern state of Karnataka, India. It is located in the Hosadurga taluk of Chitradurga district in Karnataka.

== See also ==
- Chitradurga
- Districts of Karnataka
