= One School at a Time =

Non-profit organization

One School At A Time (OSAAT) is a non-profit organization dedicated to helping rebuild infrastructure of underprivileged, rural schools in India. It is a volunteer-run organization. OSAAT has minimal administrative costs, and utilizes almost all donations received in improving rural schools of India, through rebuilding and restoration activities.

Schools previously receiving support from OSAAT include Bannerghatta Government Primary School, Bangalore Rural, Karnataka, and U.B.M.C Higher Primary School, Bajagoli, Karkala taluk, Karnataka.

== Fundraising activities ==
To assist with fundraising, the organization hosts Naatya Raaga, an annual Indian Classical Dance and Indian Classical Music contest held in February of each year.
