= Dharmapuri railway station =

Railway station in Tamil Nadu, India

Dharmapuri Dharmapuri
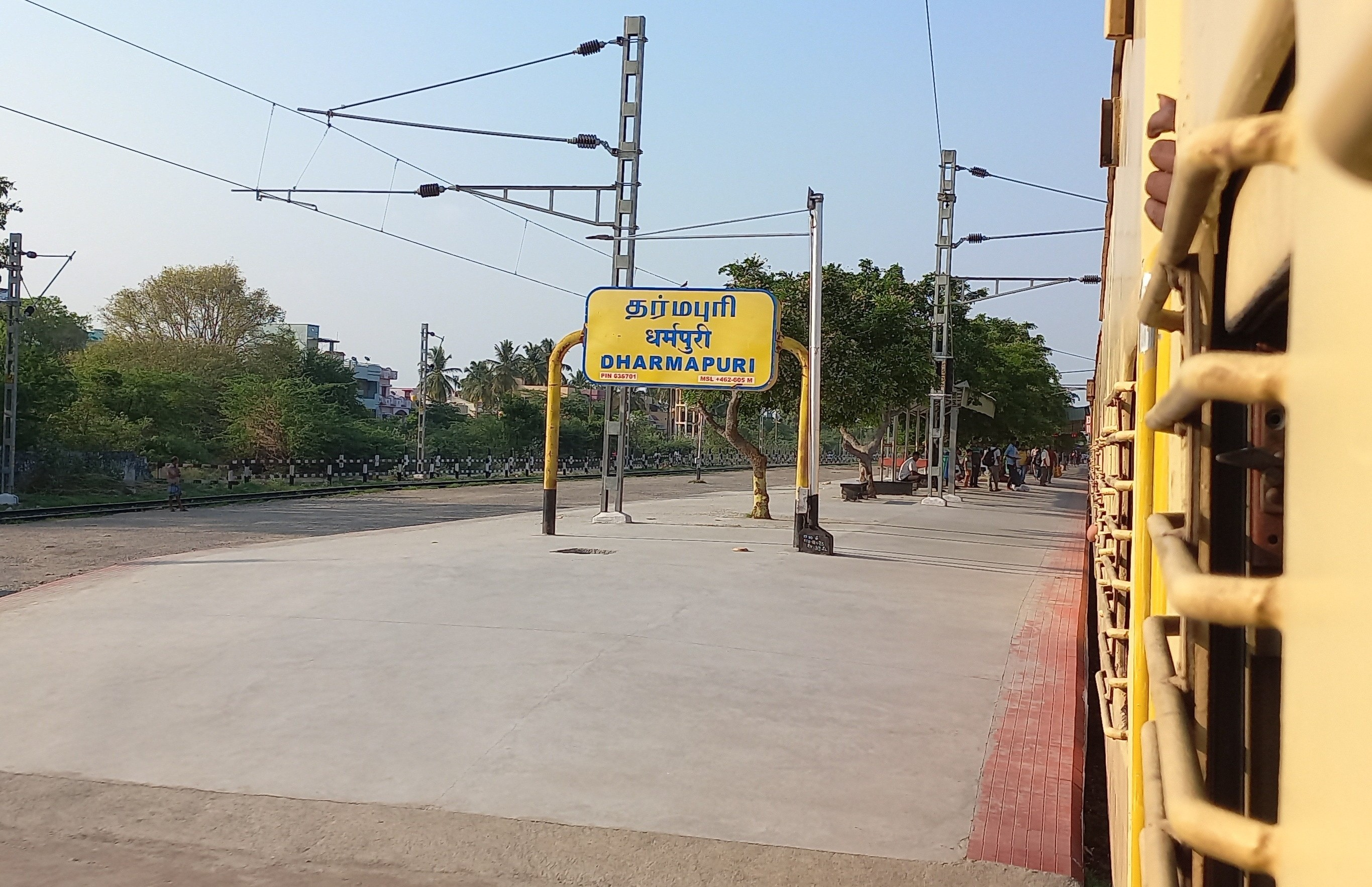

General information
- Location: Duraisamy Gounder Street, Dharmapuri, Tamil Nadu; India
- Coordinates: 12.1258°N 78.1542°E
- Elevation: 467 metres (1,532 ft)
- System: Indian Railways station
- Owner: Indian Railways
- Operator: South Western Railway zone
- Line: Bengaluru-Salem line
- Platforms: 3
- Tracks: 4
- Connections: Auto rickshaw stand, Taxi stand

Construction
- Structure type: Standard (on ground station)
- Parking: Yes
- Accessible: Disabled access

Other information
- Status: Functioning
- Station code: DPJ
- Zone(s): South Western Railway zone
- Division(s): Bangalore

History
- Opened: 16 January 1906; 120 years ago
- Rebuilt: 2011; 15 years ago
Location
- Location within Tamil Nadu Location within India

Dharmapuri railway station (station code: DPJ) is situated in the central part of Dharmapuri City, which is the headquarters of the Dharmapuri district of Tamil Nadu. It has been administered by the South Western Railway zone, included in the Bangalore railway division that was transferred over from the Southern Railway zone. It is one of the main halts in northwest Tamil Nadu. Every train passing through this route has a stop here.

== Location and layout ==
The junction is located on Duraisamy Gounder Street in the railway station road situated at proximity to the Rural/Urban Bus Terminals, Collector Office, City Market, City Bazaar, TNSTC bus depot and the Taluk office and just 0.5 kilometres (0.31 mi) from Govt Dharmapuri Medical College and Hospital and just 3 km (1.9 mi) from Adhiyaman Kottai. The nearest international airport is Kempegowda International Airport situated in Bengaluru about and distance of 170 km (110 mi) from the station.

The station is located at a height of 462 metres (1,516 ft) above sea level and has three platforms. The station is eco-friendly with many trees. It is a main stop for the trains passing through the Omalur Junction – Bangalore City railway line. Dharmapuri station is a junction (Station code itself indicates DPJ), while it was under Southern Railways and had been connected with Chennai, via Morappur by metre-gauge; as like as now connected with Bangalore, via Hosur. After reforming the zones of Indian Railways, its Chennai route was abandoned and it came under the Bangalore railway division of South Western Railways. The foundation stone was laid for the construction of the line between Dharmapuri and Morappur which measures about 36 km (22 mi). This line will connect Southern Railway with South Western Railway and reduce the travel distance between the two towns by more than 80 km. Land acquisition works were initiated for the project on 16 June 2022.

== Projects and development ==
It is one of the 73 stations in Tamil Nadu to be named for upgradation under Amrit Bharat Station Scheme of Indian Railways.

It has single line now but after upgrading hosur-banaswadi doubling then Hosur-DHARMAPURI-Omalur line will be doubled soon
