= Doddaballapura =

Doddaballapura Dod ballapura
- City
- Coat of arms
- Nickname: DB Pura
- Location in Karnataka, India
- Coordinates: 13.292°N 77.543°E
- Country: India
- State: Karnataka
- District: Bengaluru North district

Government
  - Body: City Municipal Council

Area
  - City: 14 km^{2} (5.4 sq mi)
  - Rural: 776 km^{2} (300 sq mi)
- Elevation: 880 m (2,890 ft)

Population (2011)
  - City: 93,105
  - Density: 6,700/km^{2} (17,000/sq mi)
  - Rural: 214,952

Languages
  - Official: Kannada
- Time zone: UTC+5:30 (IST)
- PIN: 561 203
- Telephone code: 080
- Vehicle registration: KA-43
- Website: http://www.doddaballapurcity.mrc.gov.in

Doddaballapura is a city and the district headquarters of Bengaluru North district in the state of Karnataka, India. Dodda means "big" in the native language Kannada. It is an industrial city which houses several national companies, and lies 40 km away from Bengaluru.

The place is mentioned as Ballalapura thanda in a record dated 1598 from the local Adinarayana temple. It might have originated from the Hoysala name Ballala, and later become corrupted as Ballapura. It is also believed that the village derived its name from a cow used to drop one 'balla' of milk over a certain anthill and this omen led to the foundation of the town. From 'balla' the name Ballapura was thus derived.

== Economy ==
Doddaballapur is about 40 km from Bengaluru towards North on Bengaluru-Hindupur state highway (SH-9). This town is known for weaving silk Sarees. Majority of Taluk's population are still agriculture as main source of income. In town area people are dependent on weaving related business (mainly power looms). Thousands of town working group travel daily to Bengaluru for work.

Bashettihalli is a nearby town with numerous industries.

The industrial area including a huge apparel park and it has multiple national and international garments factories established - employs thousands of people in and around Doddaballapura including people from Gauribidanur travelling daily to the industrial area.

Upcoming Projects:

The site of the upcoming $22 billion, 12,000-acre (49 km^{2}) BIAL IT Investment Region, the largest IT region in India and one of the largest infrastructure projects in Karnataka's history.

== Transport ==
=== Air ===
The Kempegowda International Airport is the nearest airport.

=== Rail ===
Doddaballapur railway station (Station code: DBU) is a 4 platform railway station situated on the Bengaluru - Guntakal electrified double line. No trains originate here, however multiple important trains originating from Bengaluru travelling northwards to cities like Mumbai, New Delhi, Hyderabad, Nagpur, Jaipur etc.. halt here. These trains provide rail connectivity to nearby cities like Bengaluru, Hindupur, Anantpur and Dharmavaram. The railway station is maintained by Southwestern Railway zone of Indian railways.

=== Roadways ===
Doddaballapur is connected to the Greater Bangalore metropolitan area through Karnataka State Highway 9 and is situated about 20 km away from the suburb of Yelahanka. The road is a paved 4 lane highway. National Highway 648, a stub of NH - 48 passes through Doddaballapura. This highway connects Dabaspete to Hosur. State highway 74 also passes through the city. This highway connects Nelamangala town to Chikkaballapur.
