= Bangalore railway division =

Railway division of India

Bangalore Railway Division

Overview
- Owner: South Western Railway zone
- Locale: Bengaluru, Karnataka, India

Service
- Type: Railway division
- System: Indian Railways

History
- Opened: 1971; 55 years ago

Bangalore railway division is one of the three railway divisions under the jurisdiction of South Western Railway zone of the Indian Railways. This railway division was formed in 1971 and its headquarter is located at Bengaluru in the state of Karnataka of India.

Mysore railway division, and Hubli railway division are the other railway divisions under SWR Zone headquartered at Hubli.

The overall in charge of Bangalore Division, the Divisional Railway Manager (DRM) is Shyam Singh.

The division operated India's first ACT1 double decker freight train from Penukoda in Andhra Pradesh to Farukhnagar in Haryana on 6 February 2025. The train carried 264 SUV's in 33 wagons.

== List of railway stations and towns ==
The list includes the stations under the Bangalore railway division and their station category.

Category of station	No. of stations	Names of stations
A-1 Category	3	KSR Bengaluru, Yesvantpur Junction, SMVT Bengaluru
A Category	11	Bangarapet Junction, Bangalore Cantonment, Whitefield, Kengeri, Krishnarajapuram, Hindupur, Kuppam, Malur, Banaswadi, Gauribidanur, Yelahanka Junction
B Category	3	Sri Sathya Sai Prasanthi Nilayam, Dharmapuri, Hosur
C Category (Suburban station)	3	Marikuppam, Oorugam, Coromandel
D Category	-	-
E Category	-	-
F Category; Halt Station	-	-
Total	20	-

Stations closed for passengers:

- Thanisandra railway station
