= Nelamangala =

Nelamangala ನೆಲಮಂಗಲ
- City
- Nickname: Logistics Hub of Karnataka
- Location in Karnataka, India Nelamangala (India) Nelamangala (Asia)
- Coordinates: 13.102°N 77.374°E
- Country: India
- State: Karnataka
- District: Bengaluru North District

Government
  - Body: City Municipal Council
  - MLA: Sri. Shreenivasaiah N (INC)

Area
  - City: 24.50 km^{2} (9.46 sq mi)
  - Rural: 507 km^{2} (196 sq mi)
- Elevation: 882 m (2,894 ft)

Population (2011)
  - City: 70,393
  - Density: 2,873/km^{2} (7,442/sq mi)
  - Rural: 173,657
- Time zone: UTC+5:30 (IST)
- PIN: 562 123
- Telephone code: 08118
- Vehicle registration: KA-52

Nelamangala is a town and a taluk headquarter in Bengaluru North District of Karnataka, India, north-west of the capital city of Bengaluru.

== Geography ==
Nelamangala taluk is spread over 507 km^{2}. It is located at 13.09°N 77.39°E.

== Demographics ==
According to the 2011 census, Nelamangala had a population of 37,232, of whom 18,840 were males while 18,392 were females. The literacy rate in Nelamangala was 89.65%. In Nelamangala, male literacy was around 93.27% while female literacy rate was 85.97%.

== Work profile ==
Out of the total population, 14,600 were engaged in some sort of work or business activity. Of these, 11,118 were males while 3,482 were females. In the census survey, workers are defined as someone who does business, job, or service, and are engaged in labour activities. Out of the total 14,600 working population, 91.54% were engaged in main work while 8.46% were engaged in marginal work.

== Transport ==
=== Road ===
Nelamangala is connected by road to major cities in Karnataka. It lies on NH 48 between Bengaluru and Tumakuru.

=== Rail ===
Nelamangala has a railway station which lies on the Hassan-Bengaluru section of the IR.
