= Bengaluru North district =

- District
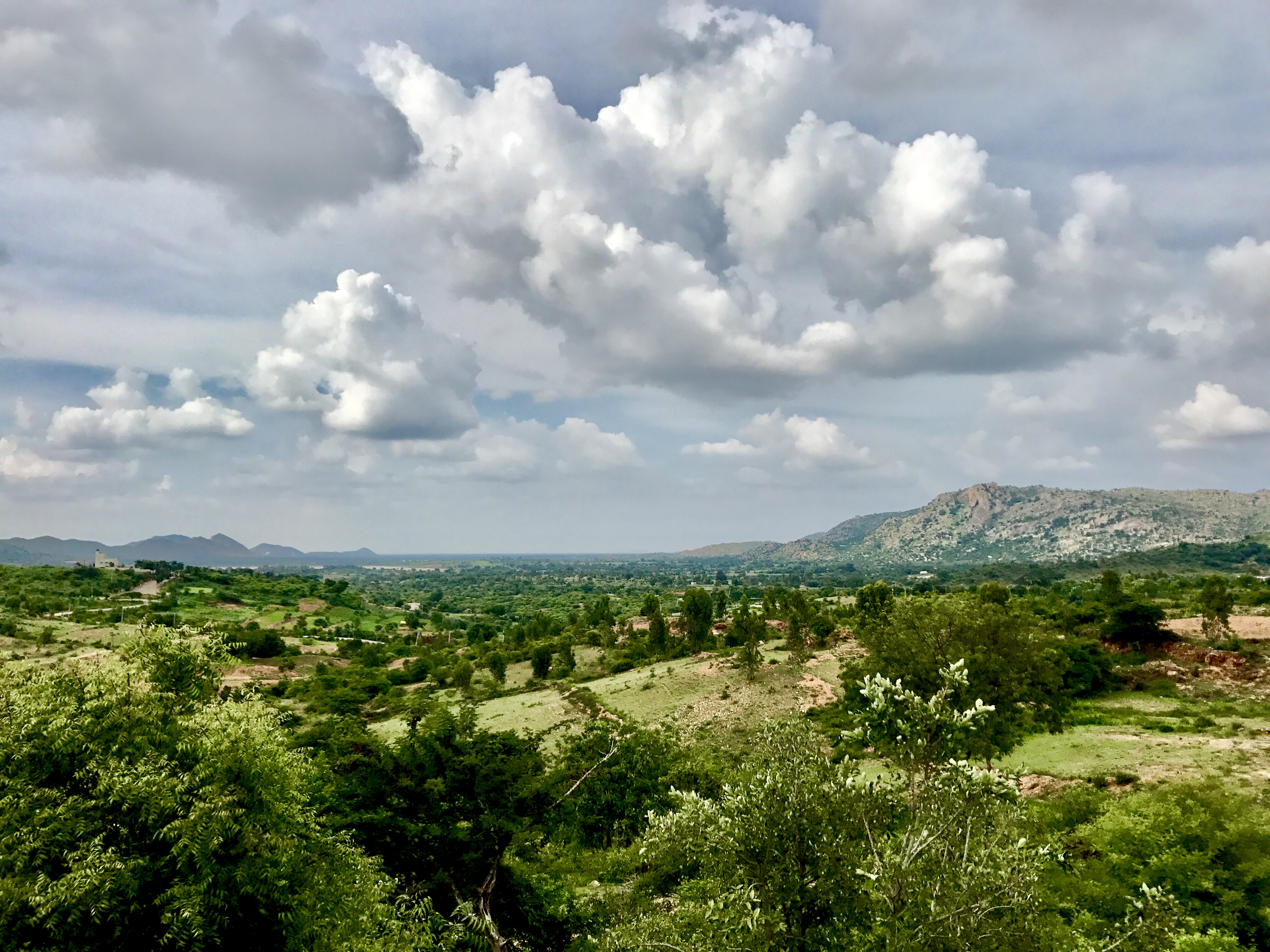
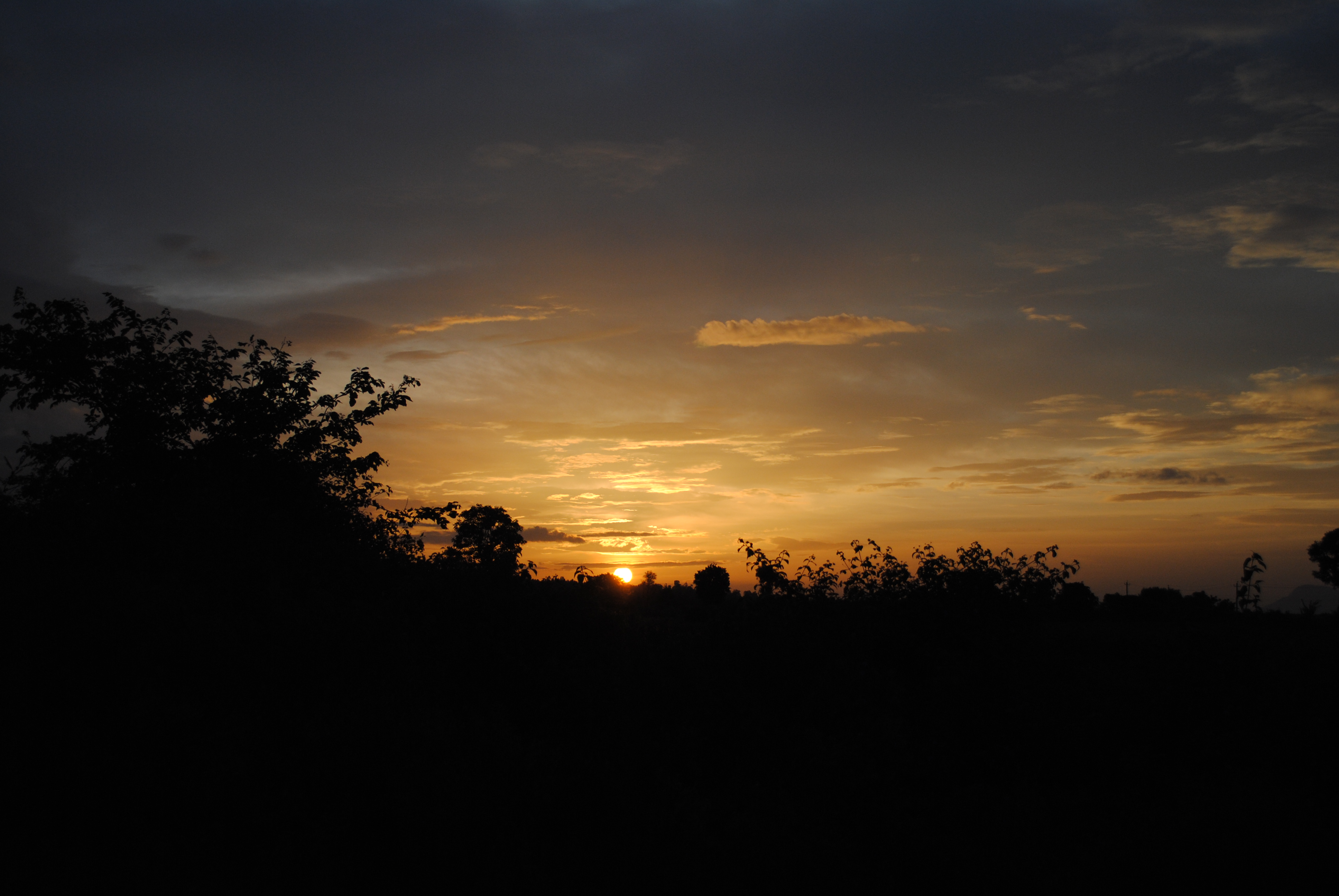
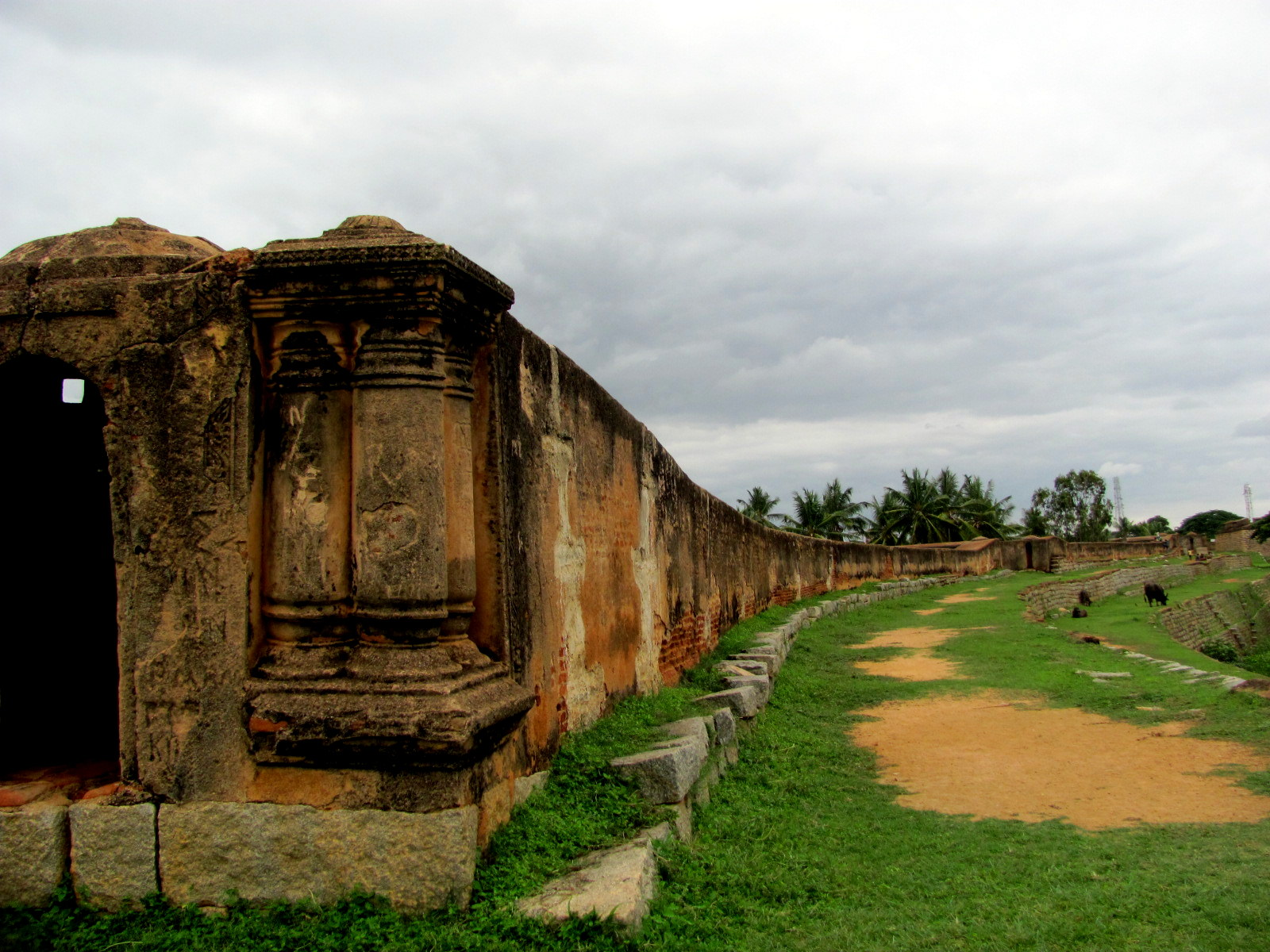
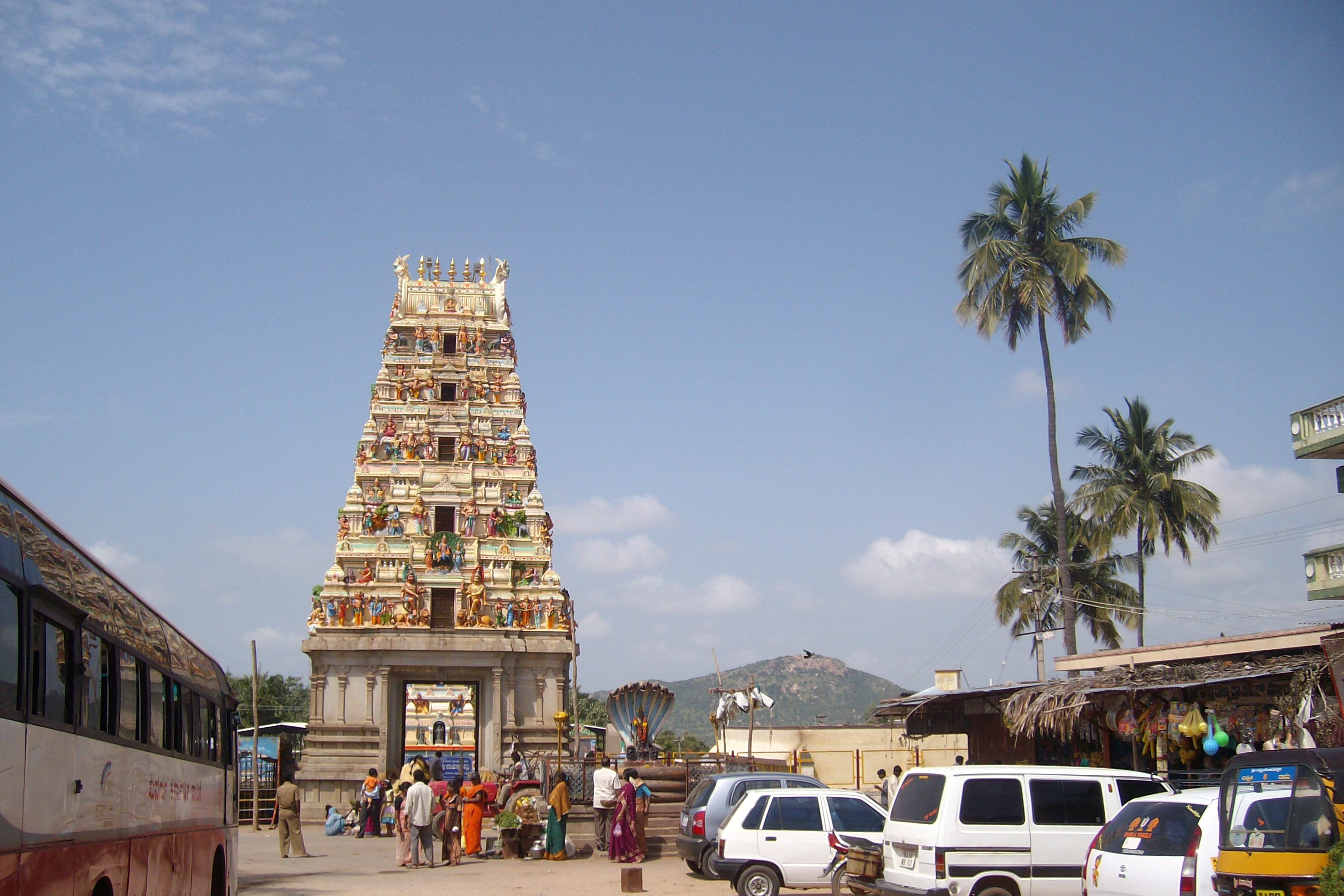
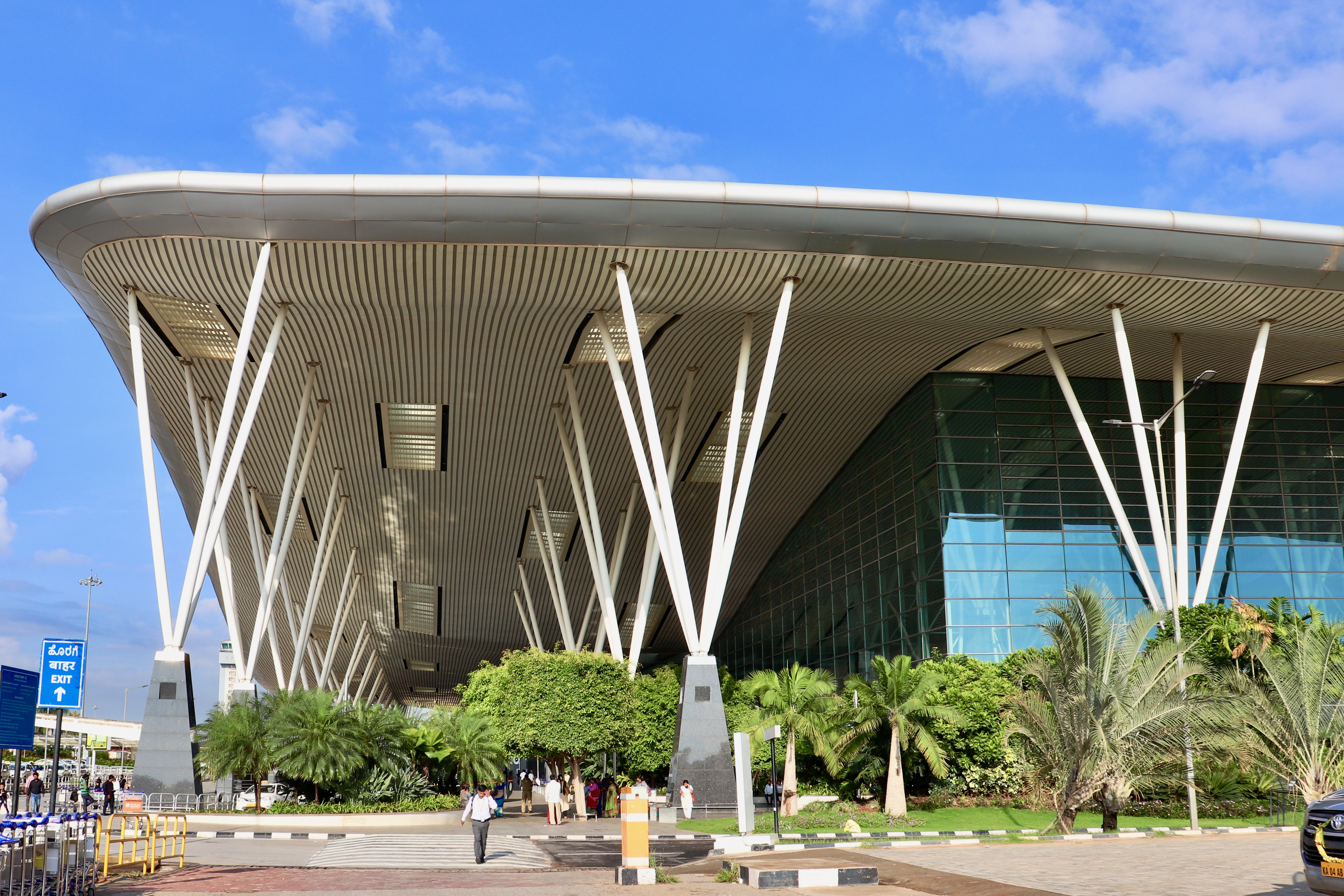
- Clockwise from top-left: Hills near Doddaballapura, sunset near Hoskote, Ghati Subramanya Temple, Kempegowda International Airport, Devanahalli Fort
- Interactive map of Bengaluru North district
- Coordinates: 13.280602°N 77.622607°E
- Country: India
- State: Karnataka
- Headquarters: Devanahalli
- Formation: 15 August 1986
- Founder: Government of Karnataka
- Talukas: Devanahalli, Doddaballapura, Hoskote, Nelamangala,

Government
  - Deputy Commissioner & Collector: Basavaraju A.B (IAS)
  - Additional Deputy Commissioner: Syeeda iisha (KAS)
  - Superintendent of Police (SP): C.K.BABA, IPS
  - District incharge Minister: D. K. Shivakumar

Area
  - Total: 2,298 km^{2} (887 sq mi)
  - Rank: 30th

Population (2011)
  - Total: 990,923
  - Density: 431.2/km^{2} (1,117/sq mi)

Languages
  - Official: Kannada
- Time zone: UTC+5:30 (IST)
- Telephone code: + 91-80
- Vehicle registration: Devanahalli KA 43; Nelamangala KA 52; Hosakote KA 53
- Website: bangalorerural.nic.in/en/

Bengaluru North district is one of the 31 districts in Karnataka, India. It was formed in 1986, when Bangalore District was divided into Bangalore Rural and Bangalore Urban.

Presently in Bengaluru North district, there are 4 talukas:

- Devanahalli
- Nelamangala
- Doddaballapura
- Hoskote

It has 20 hoblies, 294 villages, 3 towns, 2 tier-three cities, administered by 66 Village Panchayats (Grama Panchayitis), 3 Town Municipal Councils (Purasabes) and 2 City Municipal Councils (Nagarsabes).

Proximity to the city of Bengaluru has its impact on the district, with a considerable daily commuting population. The rural people are mostly agriculturists, although with the advent of Special Economic Zones in the area, service and IT industries are booming. Devanahalli is set to be the site of a ₹95 billion Devanahalli Business Park, near the Kempegowda International Airport.

== District profile ==
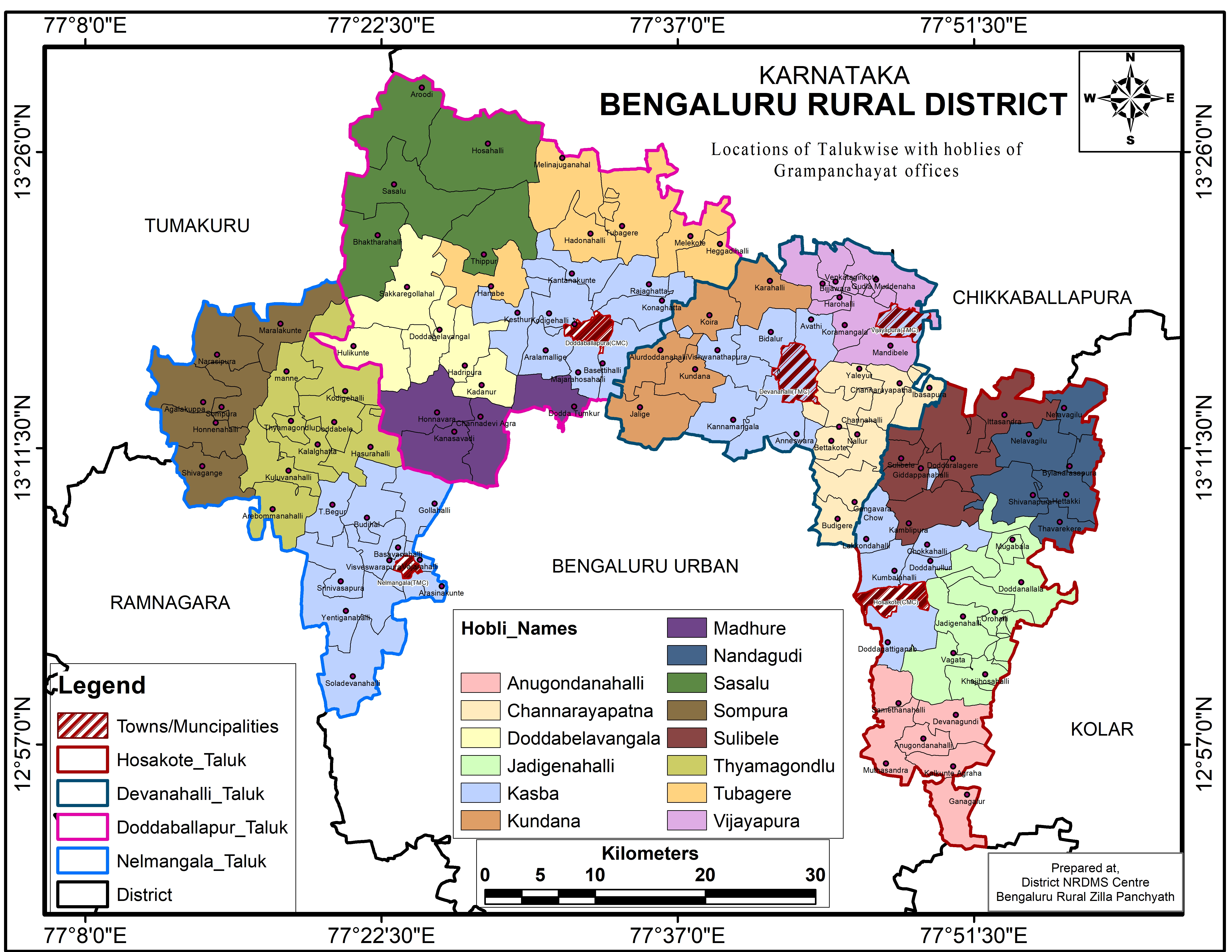

According to the 2011 census, the total population of the district was, 990,923 of which 21.65% were urban with a population density of 309 persons per km^{2}. Bangalore Rural district has 22.5% of its population belonging to the Scheduled Caste and Scheduled Tribe. Hinduism is the major religion of this district. The Bangalore Rural district is essentially an agriculture district but it has sufficient scope for industrialisation, dairy development and sericulture.

It is the second least populous district in Karnataka (out of 30), after Kodagu. The district is endowed with agricultural and horticultural crops such as ragi, rice, groundnut, sugarcane, castor, grapes, mulberry, etc. There are adequate infrastructural facilities such as transport and communications, banking, credit, and marketing. Though the region is not rich in mineral resources, its non-metallic mineral resources are utilised for bricks, tiles, and stoneware manufacture. For many years, weaving has also been a major occupation for a large section of the population. The soil and such climatic conditions are congenial for the cultivation of mulberry, rearing of silkworms, and production of silk, besides other agro-based industries. There are a number of wineries and quantity of production of wine has been increasing. There is a proposal by the Government of Karnataka to rename Bangalore Rural district to Kempe Gowda. In September 2007, the taluks of Kanakapura, Ramanagara, Magadi and Channapatna were merged to form the Ramanagara district.

== Demographics ==
Historical population
Year	Pop.	±% p.a.
1901	226,341	—
1911	238,293	+0.52%
1921	238,783	+0.02%
1931	262,885	+0.97%
1941	295,399	+1.17%
1951	358,106	+1.94%
1961	406,828	+1.28%
1971	484,947	+1.77%
1981	608,535	+2.30%
1991	717,525	+1.66%
2001	850,968	+1.72%
2011	990,923	+1.53%

Religion in Bengaluru Rural district (2011)
Religion	Percent
Hinduism	89.86%
Islam	9.31%
Christianity	0.54%
Other or not stated	0.29%

According to the 2011 census Bangalore Rural district has a population of 990,923. This gives it a ranking of 449th in India (out of a total of 640). The district has a population density of 441 inhabitants per square kilometre (1,140/sq mi). Its population growth rate over the decade 2001-2011 was 16.02%. Bangalore Rural has a sex ratio of 945 females for every 1000 males, and a literacy rate of 78.29%. 27.12% of the population lives in urban areas. Scheduled Castes and Scheduled Tribes make up 21.57% and 5.34% of the population respectively.

Languages of Bengaluru Rural district (2011)
1. Kannada (71.7%)
2. Telugu (12.8%)
3. Urdu (9.22%)
4. Tamil (3.29%)
5. Hindi (0.96%)
6. Others (2.02%)

At the time of the 2011 census, 71.67% of the population spoke Kannada, 12.84% Telugu, 9.22% Urdu and 3.29% Tamil and 0.96% Hindi as their first language.

== Villages and census towns ==
- Dargajogihalli

== See also ==
- One School at a Time
