= Mallur =

Mallur may refer to:

- Mallur, Ariyalur, a village in Ariyalur district, Tamil Nadu, India
- Mallur, Dharwad, a village in Dharwad district, Karnataka, India
- Mallur, Karnataka, a village in Bangalore district, Karnataka, India
- Mallur, Salem, a village in Salem district, Tamil Nadu, India
  - Mallur railway station
- Malluru, a village in Chikkaballapur district, Karnataka, India
