= Meluru =

- Village
- Interactive map of Meluru
- Coordinates: 13.35°N 77.83°E
- Country: India
- State: Karnataka
- District: Chikkaballapur

Population (2011)
  - Total: 2,946

Languages
  - Official: Kannada
- Time zone: UTC+5:30 (IST)
- PIN: 562102
- Nearest city: Sidlaghatta
- Literacy: 80%
- Lok Sabha constituency: Chikkaballapur
- Vidhan Sabha constituency: Chikkaballapur

Meluru (Melur Village) and Grama Panchayat are in Sidlaghatta Taluk. It is 20 km from Chikkaballapura district, 20 km from Bengaluru International Airport in Devanahalli, 5 km from Vijayapura and 9 km from Sidlaghatta. It is also around 53 km from Majestic bus stand in Bengaluru.

== Demography ==
Meluru is home to nearly 3000 people living in 2,000 homes. The sex ratio is 980:1000 and the literacy rate is 85%.

1 km away is the village Malluru which is said to be Meluru's twin sister. The residents of both settlements proposed to form a town panchayat together in order to get more services and improve the regions' development.

== Education ==
Government high school, primary schools and private schools.

== History ==
According to the 2011 Census, the location code or village code of Melur village is 624240. Melur village is located in Sidlaghatta Tehsil of Chikkaballapura district in Karnataka, India. It is situated 5 km away from sub-district headquarter Sidlaghatta and 19 km away from district headquarter Chikkaballapur. As per 2009 stats, Melur village is also a gram panchayat.

The total geographical area of village is 142.37 hectares. Melur has a total population of 2,946 peoples. There are about 738 houses in Melur village. Sidlaghatta is nearest town to Melur which is approximately 5 km away.

Public bus Service is available within the village, while private bus and railway service is located 5 – 10 km away.

== Economy ==
The major occupations of the residents of Melur are sericulture and dairy farming. The dairy cooperative is the largest individual milk supplying cooperative in the state. Its administration is one of the best examples for the success of cooperative movements in the village.

== Environmental issues ==
The region is notorious for the huge depletion of ground water. There are a few thousand bore wells, of which 90% are dry. One problem that still needs a solution is the missing access to drinkable water. There have been some attempts by the farmers but so far they have been in vain. The rainfall in this area is almost as scanty, as in the Ananthpur district, which is the second most dry district in India. The average rainfall here is around 20 cm -30 cm annual. The major reason for the water depletion is the absence of micro irrigation systems and intensive farming practices during the 1980s and 1990s. Because of the lack of irrigation facilities, the young population commutes to Bengaluru to work.

== Geography ==
Meluru is located at 13.30° N 77.80°. It has an average elevation of 883 m (2,897 ft).
