= Malluru =

Mallur, Karnataka
- Village
- Interactive map of Mallur, Karnataka
- Coordinates: 13.34062°N 77.81711°E
- Country: India
- State: Karnataka
- District: Chikkaballapur

Population
  - Total: 3,294

Languages
  - Official: Kannada
- Time zone: UTC+5:30 (IST)
- PIN: 562102
- Nearest city: Sidlaghatta
- Literacy: 70%
- Lok Sabha constituency: Chikkaballapur
- Vidhan Sabha constituency: Chikkaballapur

Mallur is a village and Grama Panchayat in Sidlaghatta taluk, India. It is 20 km from the Chikkaballapur district and 20 km from Bengalooru International Airport Devanahalli. It is also about 45 km from the Majestic bus stand of Bengalooru city.

== Demography ==
Mallur is home to nearly 3294 people living in 3,000 homes. The sex ratio is 980:1000 and the literacy rate is 65%.

1 km away is the village Meluru which is said to be Malluru's twin sister. The residents of both settlements proposed to form a town panchayath in order to provide more amenities and improve the development of the region.

== Education ==
The Pre-university College, which is aided by the government and managed by the village development cooperative of Malluru, is well known for its quality education. It is run by the Swami Vivekananda Educational Trust. This educational institution was set up by the village development cooperative to provide affordable quality education to the children of Malluru and the nearby villages and is governed by a committee elected by village development cooperative society members.

== History ==
Mr.Papanna, a freedom fighter who died 15 years ago, dedicated his life to the development of villages through cooperative movement, which people embraced. He has set up nearly 10 cooperative institutions for milk producers, wool producers, silk producers, village development, healthcare etc. most of which are inactive today. The cooperative movement was very successful for decades, till recently the development of the village was administered by the village development cooperative society. The village had its own health center which was governed and run by the cooperative with St. Johns hospital of Bengaluru as medical partner. Recently the collaboration stopped mostly for reasons due to village politics. During the freedom movement more than 50 villagers participated in the struggle. Every household had a member participating in the struggle for independence. One noted participant was Mr. Muniyappa, also called Ayya by the villagers, who is now more than 90 years old and still in good health. He participates in educating school children informing them about the fight for freedom and the importance of the freedom movement. This village is also known for its resident's interest in politics which decreased the participation of the cooperative movement, because of this the active participation of the community in politics is believed to be an obstacle to a sustainable development of the villages.

== Economy ==
The major occupations of the residents of Malluru are sericulture and dairy farming. The dairy cooperative is the largest individual milk supplying cooperative in the state. Its administration is one of the best examples for the success of cooperative movements in the village.

== Environmental issues ==
The region is notorious for the huge depletion of ground water. There are a few thousand bore wells, of which 90% are dry. One problem that still needs solution is the missing access to drinkable water. There have been some attempts by the farmers but so far they have been in vain. The rainfall in this area is almost as scanty, as in the Ananthpur district, which is the second most dry district in India. The average rainfall here is around 20 cm -30 cm annual. The major reason for the water depletion is the absence of micro irrigation systems and the intensive farming during the 1980s and 1990s. Because of the lack of irrigation facilities, the young population commutes to Bangalore to work.

== Geography ==
Malluru is located at 13.20°N 77.49°E. It has an average elevation of 950 m (3,120 ft).
