= BIAL IT Investment Region =

The Bangalore-BIAL ITIR is a 50 km^{2} (12,000 acres) IT Investment Region that was proposed in 2010 15 km north of Kempegowda International Airport in Bengaluru.

On 15 July, the region received final legislative approval from the state assembly and from the centre on 20 September 2013. The region is near Devanahalli. The Karnataka government has set up an empowered committee headed by Former Chief Minister D. V. Sadananda Gowda and IT/BT minister to guide the development of the region.

The ITIR was one of the largest proposed infrastructure projects in Karnataka's history. The development will involve a Centre-State partnership in conjunction with private partners. Basic infrastructure such as road, rail and telecommunication links will be provided by the Centre. The State governments will provide physical infrastructure and utilities, including power, water, sewerage and effluent treatment facilities. The Karnataka State Electronics Development Corporation (KEONICS) has recently issued Expression of Interest (EOI) for developing the region. Over 55 multinational IT companies including Infosys, Wipro, TCS, and Cognizant have signaled an interest in joining and have signed MOUs.

In 2015, the Times of India reported that the project had been put on hold, because of both the increase in the value of the agricultural land it would need to acquire, and " lack of interest shown by major IT companies " The article also said that " IT companies are also worried about the connectivity and travel time."
