= Venugopalaswamy Temple, Devanahalli =

Venugopalaswamy temple
- Hindu temple
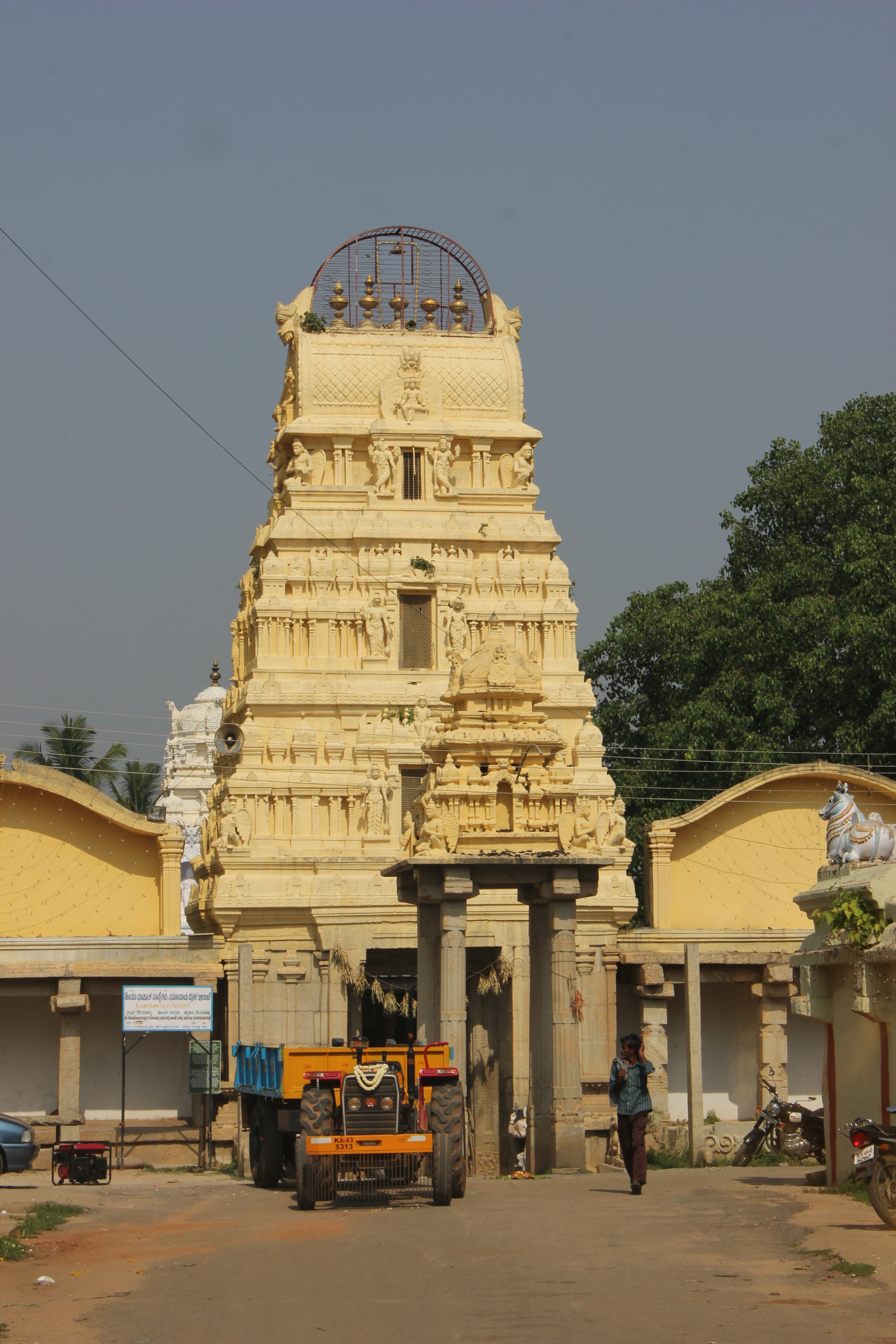
- Gopura over entrance at Venugopalaswamy temple

- Location in Karnataka, India
- Coordinates: 13.23°N 77.7°E
- Country: India
- State: Karnataka
- District: Bangalore Rural

Languages
  - Official: Kannada
- Time zone: UTC+5:30 (IST)
- Vehicle registration: KA-43

The Venugopalaswamy Temple, dedicated to a form of the Hindu god Vishnu is located inside the Devanahalli Fort in the town of Devanahalli (also called Devanapura). It is a town in the Bangalore Rural district, Karnataka state, India and is located 35 kilometres (25 mi) to the north-east of Bangalore, the state capital. The Venugopalaswamy temple is constructed in the Dravidian style and belongs to the post Vijayanagara Empire period. The temple is a protected monument under the Karnataka state division of the Archaeological Survey of India.

== Gallery ==
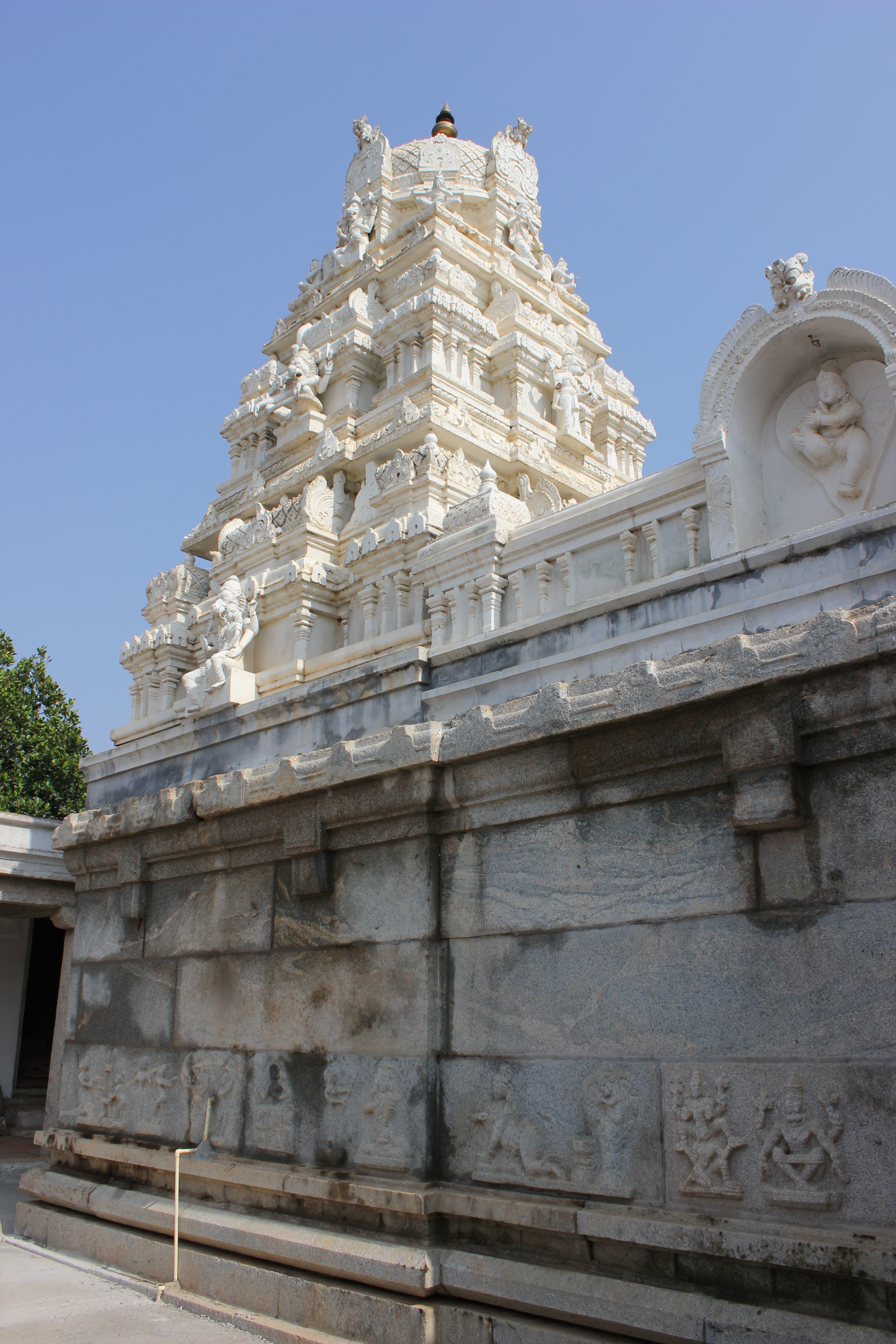
Dravida style shikhara (tower over shrine) at the Venugopalaswamy temple in the Devanahalli fort

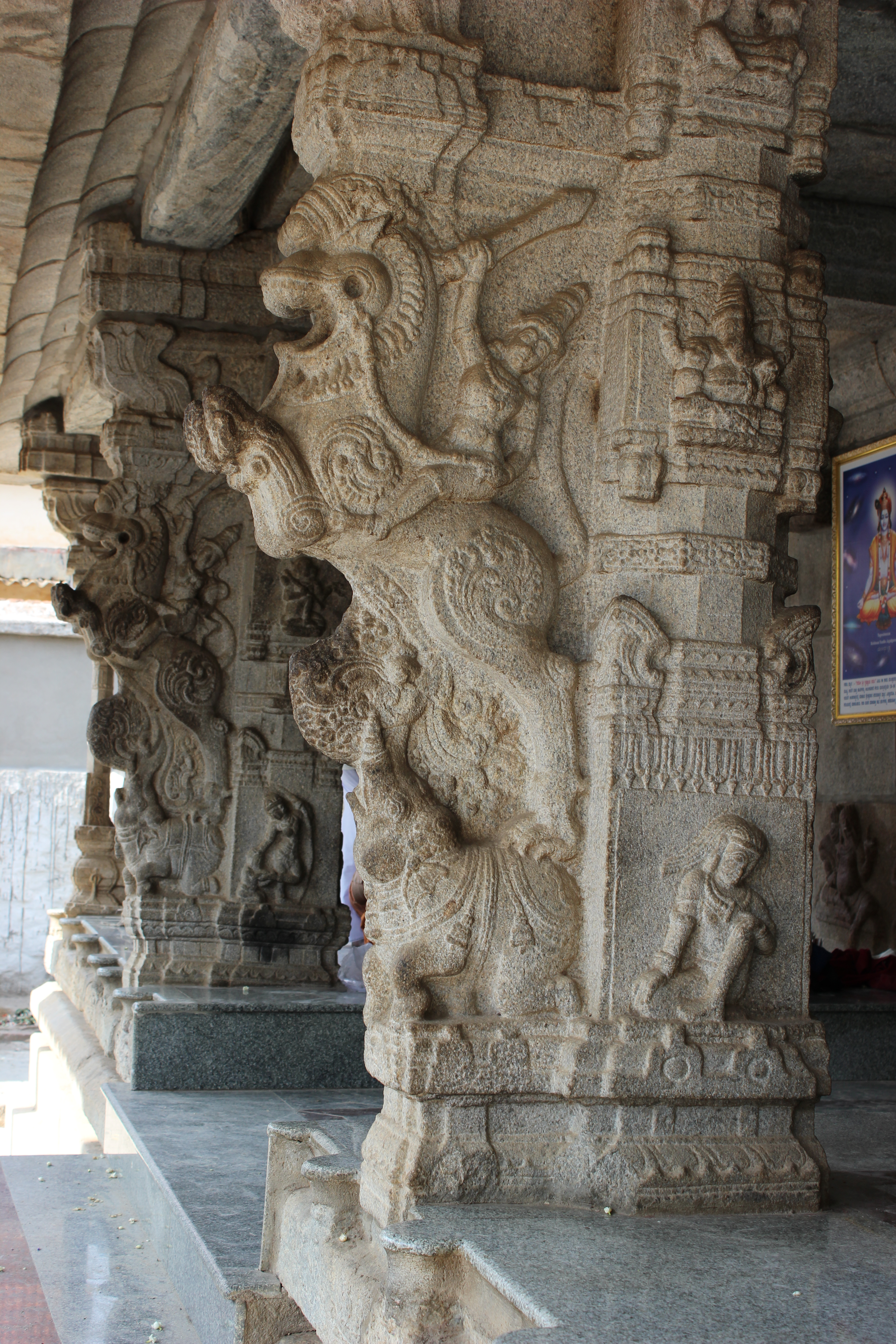
Yali pillars at the entrance to closed mantapa (hall) in the Venugopalaswamy temple in the Devanahalli fort

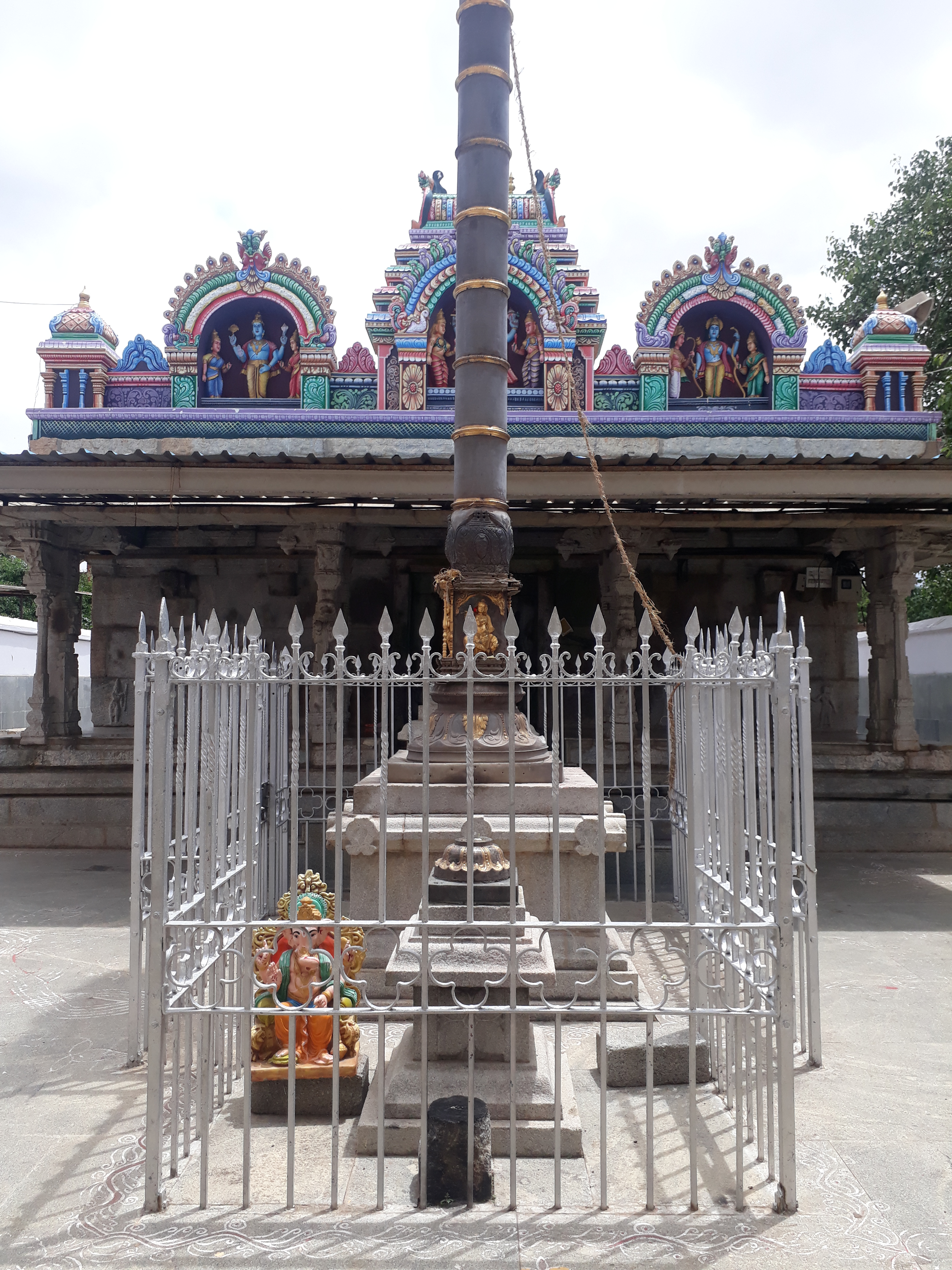
Pillar inside the Venugopalaswamy Temple

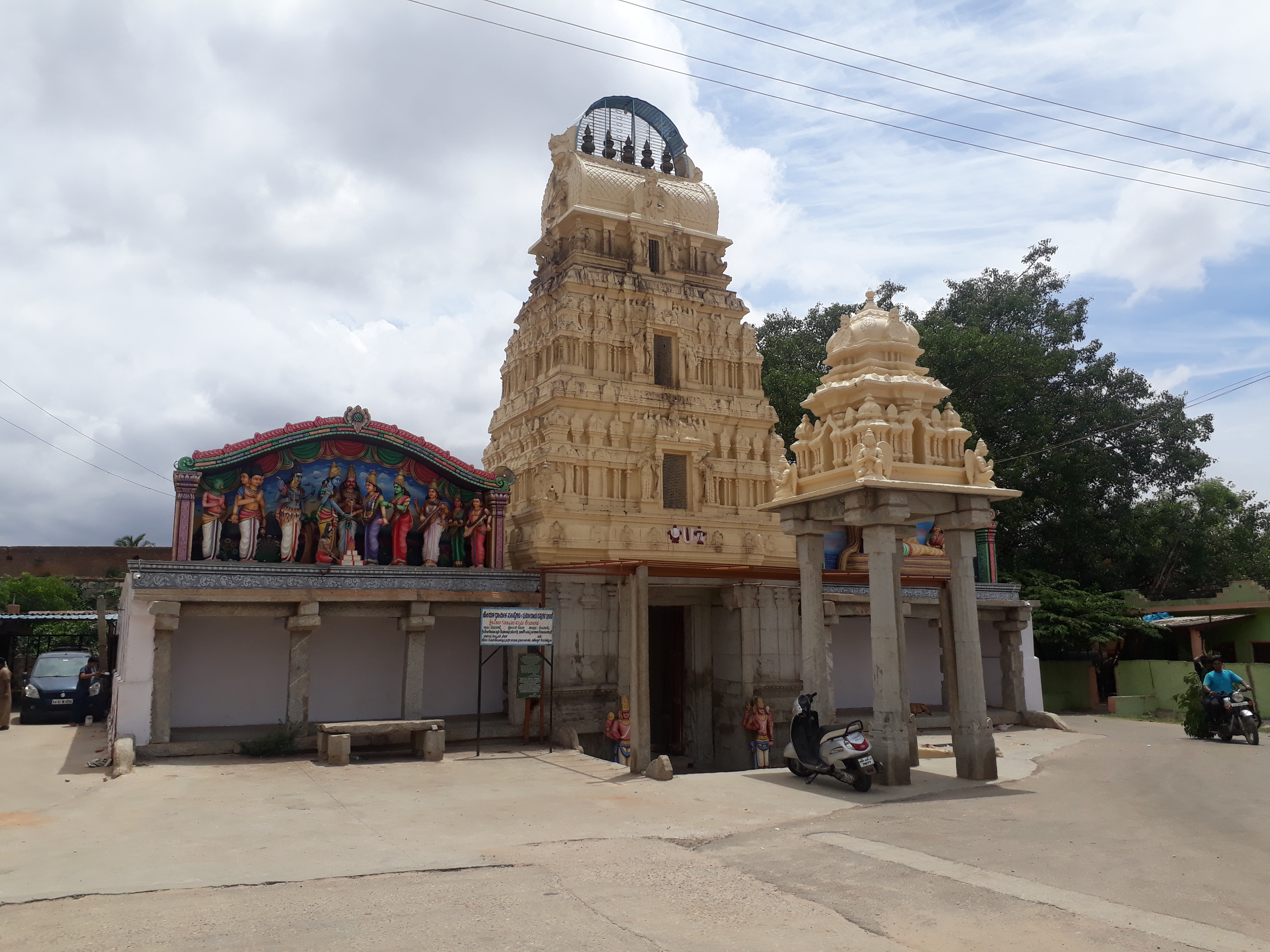
Complete views of Venugopalaswamy Temple from outside

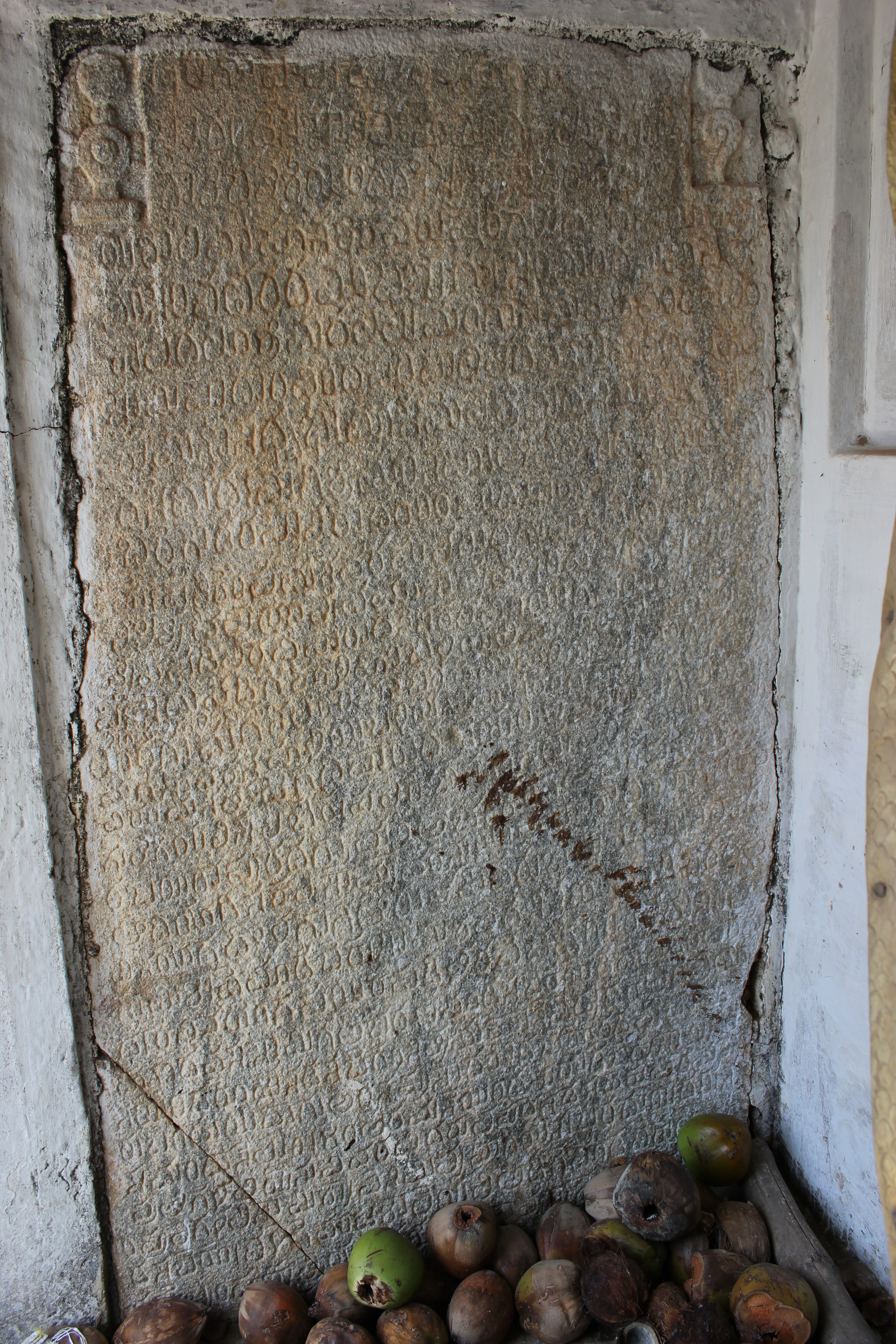
Kannada inscription (1697 AD) at the Venugopalaswamy temple in the Devanahalli fort
