= Devanahalli Fort =

- village
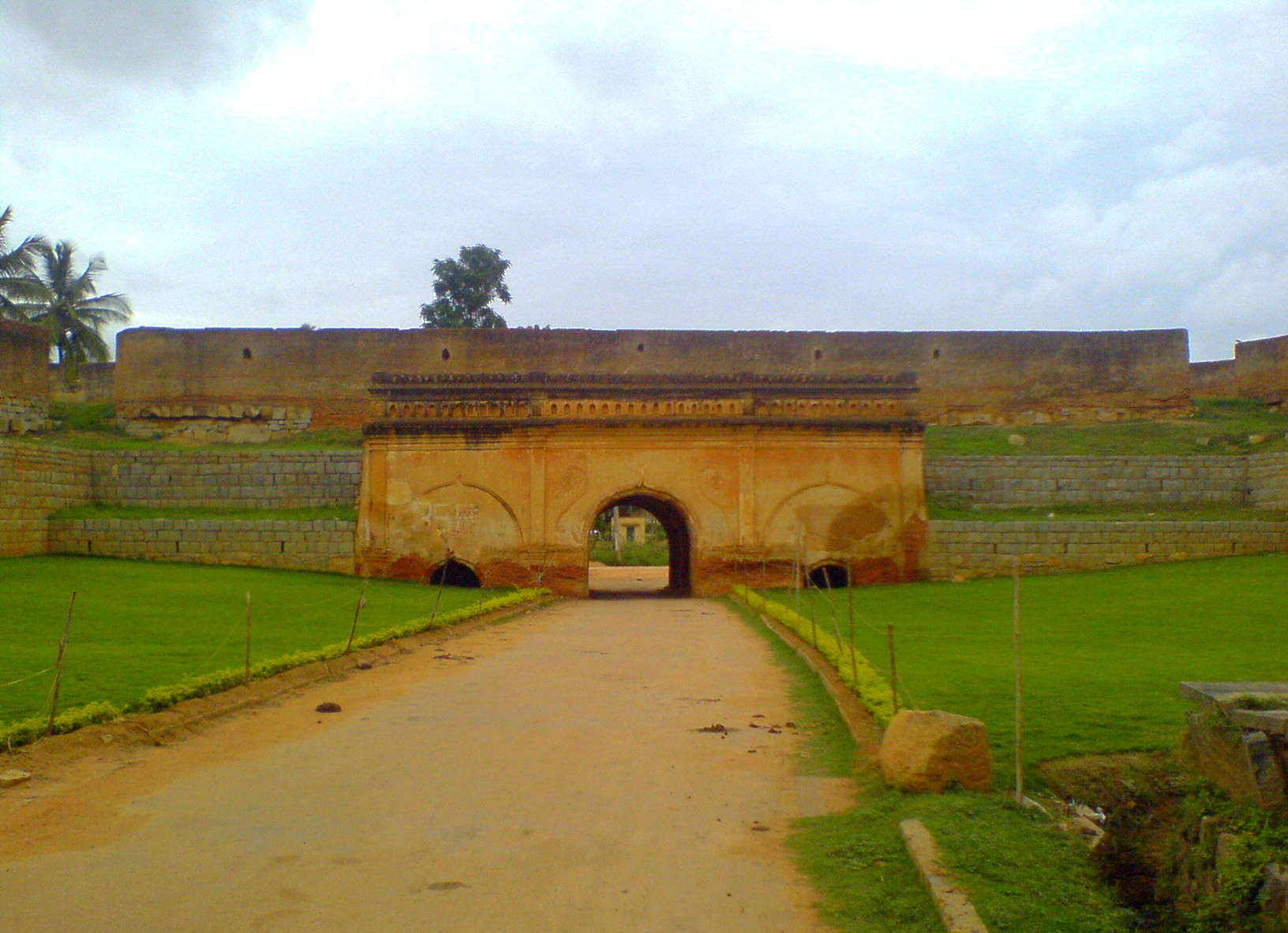
- Entrance from inside, Devanahalli Fort

- Location in Karnataka, India
- Coordinates: 13.24960°N 77.70939°E
- Country: India
- State: Karnataka
- District: Bangalore Rural

Languages
  - Official: Kannada
- Time zone: UTC+5:30 (IST)

Devanahalli Fort is located 35 kilometers (22 mi) north of Bangalore city, at Devanahalli in the State of Karnataka, India. Chieftain Malla Byre Gowda of Avathi, a Vijayanagara Empire vassal, built a mud fort in c. 1501 at Devanadoddi (now called Devanahalli). In the late 18th century, Hyder Ali re-constructed the fort in stone resulting in the current structure.

It was originally built in 1501 by Mallabairegowda, which remained in the hands of his descendants until the mid–eighteenth century. In 1749, the then Dalwai of Mysore, Nanjarajaiah, attacked the fort and occupied it. Later, the fort passed into the hands of Hyder Ali and subsequently Tipu Sultan. In 1791, Lord Cornwallis laid siege to the fort and took possession during the Anglo-Mysore War.

The birthplace of Tipu Sultan, also known as Tiger of Mysore, is located near to the fort. The fort is situated on the side of National Highway 7, near the Bengaluru International Airport.

An Archaeological Survey of India (ASI) board outside the fort and at Tipu Sultan's birthplace declares them to be protected monuments.

== History ==
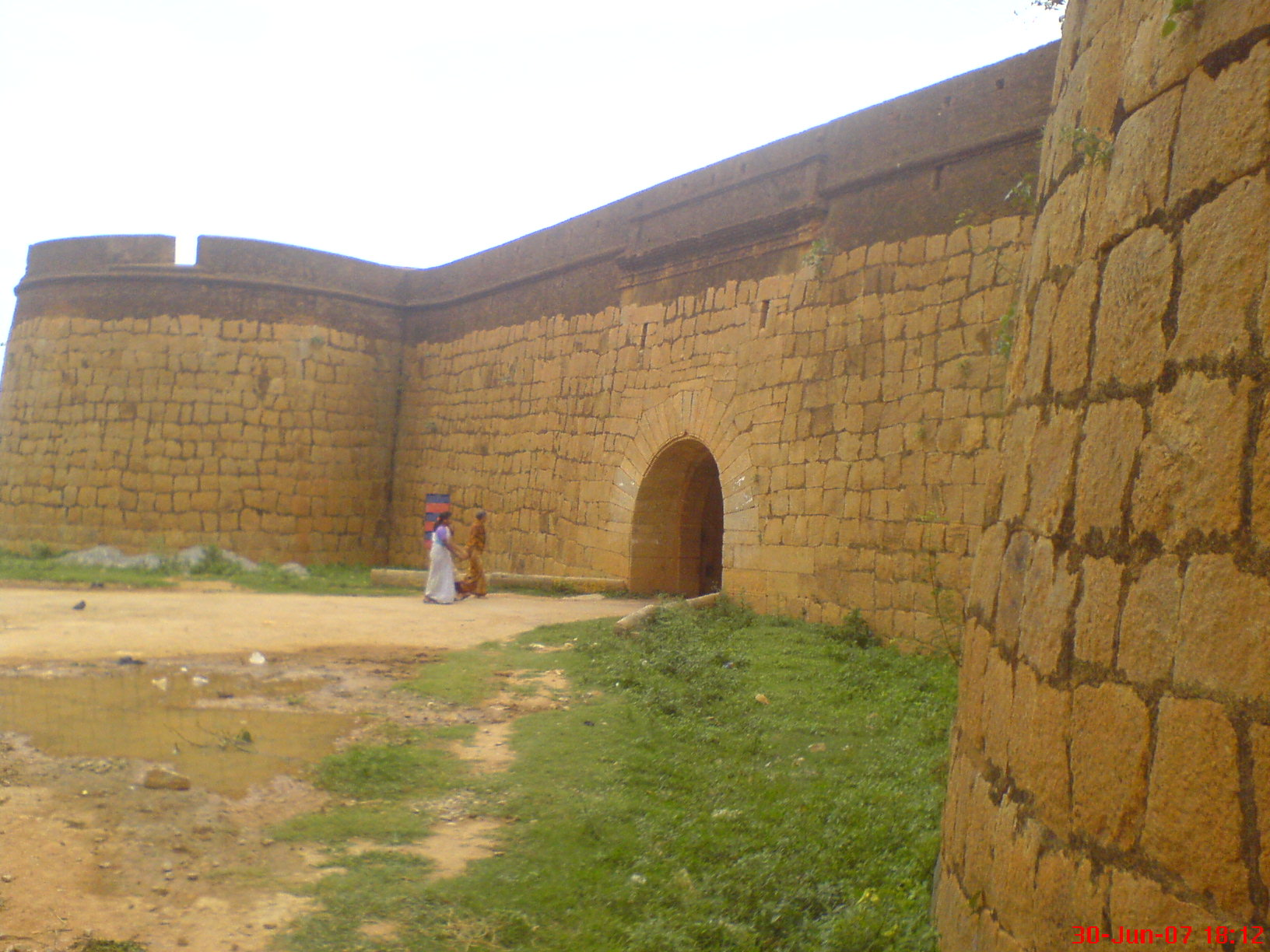
Exterior of the fort

The history of Devanahalli dates back to 15th century, when a family of fleeing refugees from Conjeevaram (modern day Kanchi), camped near the foot of Ramaswami betta, east of Nandi Hills. Their leader Rana Baire Gowda was apparently directed in a dream to set up a settlement in this region. He and his Morasu Wokkalu family settled in a small village, Ahuti, which was later known as Avati. His son Malla Baire Gowda founded Devanahalli, Chikka-ballapura and Dodda-ballapura. Kempegowda, the founder of Bangalore city is also from Morasu Wokkalu family.

Devanahalli was part of Gangawadi and later came under the rule of Rashatrakutas, Nolamba, Pallavas, Cholas, Hoysalas and the Vijayanagara rulers. During the time of Vijayanagara rule, Malla Baire constructed the initial mud fort in 1501 AD with the consent of Devaraya at Devanadoddi, the previous name of Devanahalli. In 1747 AD, the fort passed into the hands of the Wodeyars of Mysore under the command of Nanja Raja. It was conquered many times from the Marathas and later came under the control of Haider Ali and Tipu Sultan.

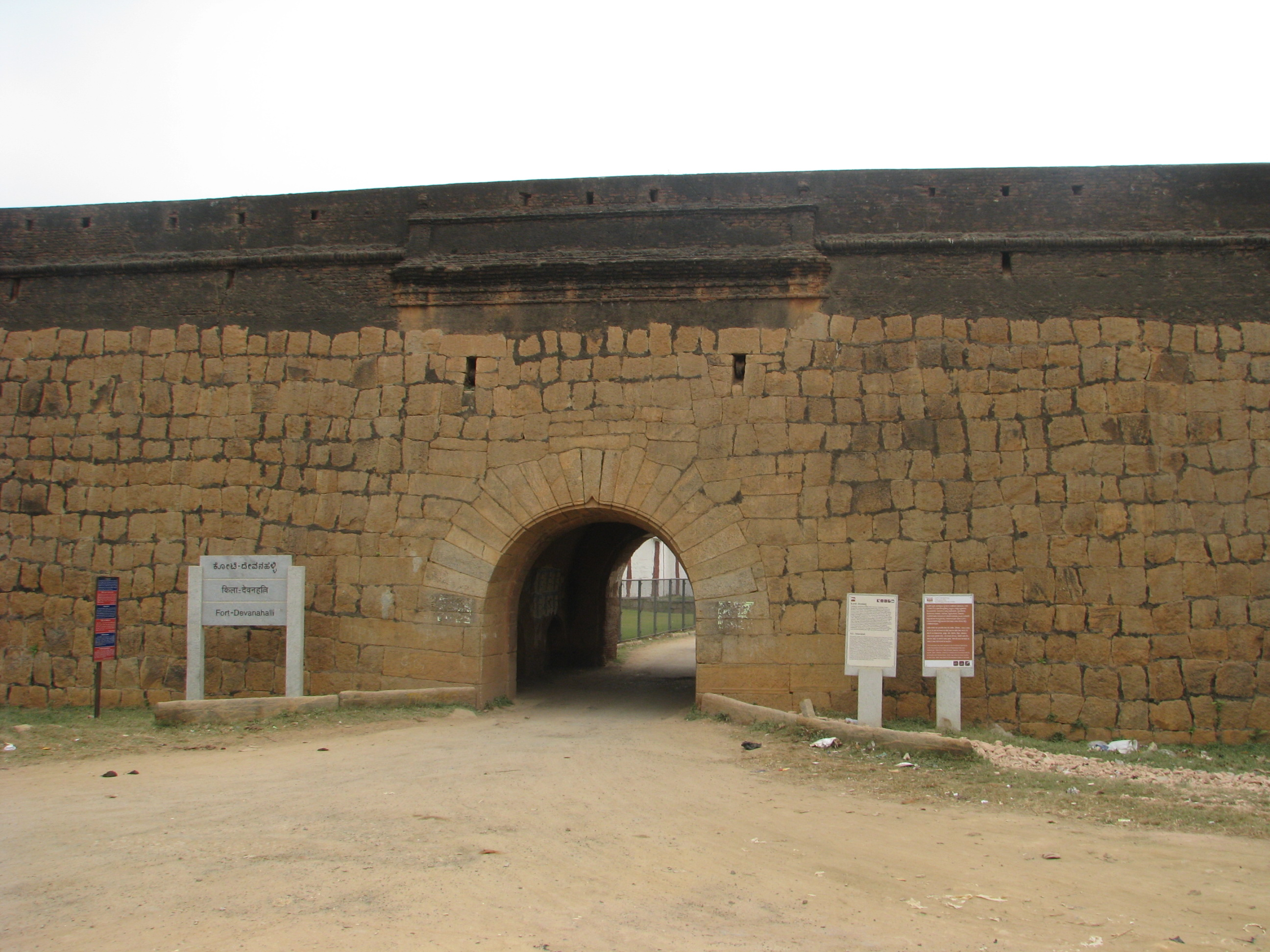
Fort entrance

Tipu also renamed it as Yousafabad (the abode of Yousuf, the finest man) which never got popular. The fort finally fell into the British, under Lord Cornwallis in 1791, during the Mysore War.

== Architecture ==
Fort is spread over an area of 20 acres (8 ha). The roughly oval east oriented fortification veneered with dressed masonry has as many as 12 semi-circular bastions at regular intervals. A spacious battlement is provided towards the inner side of the fortification. The fort has entrances decorated with cut plasterwork at the east and west. The entrances are quite small, comfortable enough for the horses of yore. The bastions are provided with gun points built with lime and brick.

The house in which Tipu and Hyder Ali lived also still exists. The house of Dewan Purnaiah, a high-ranking official in Hyder Ali and Tipu Sultan's court, is also located inside the fort.

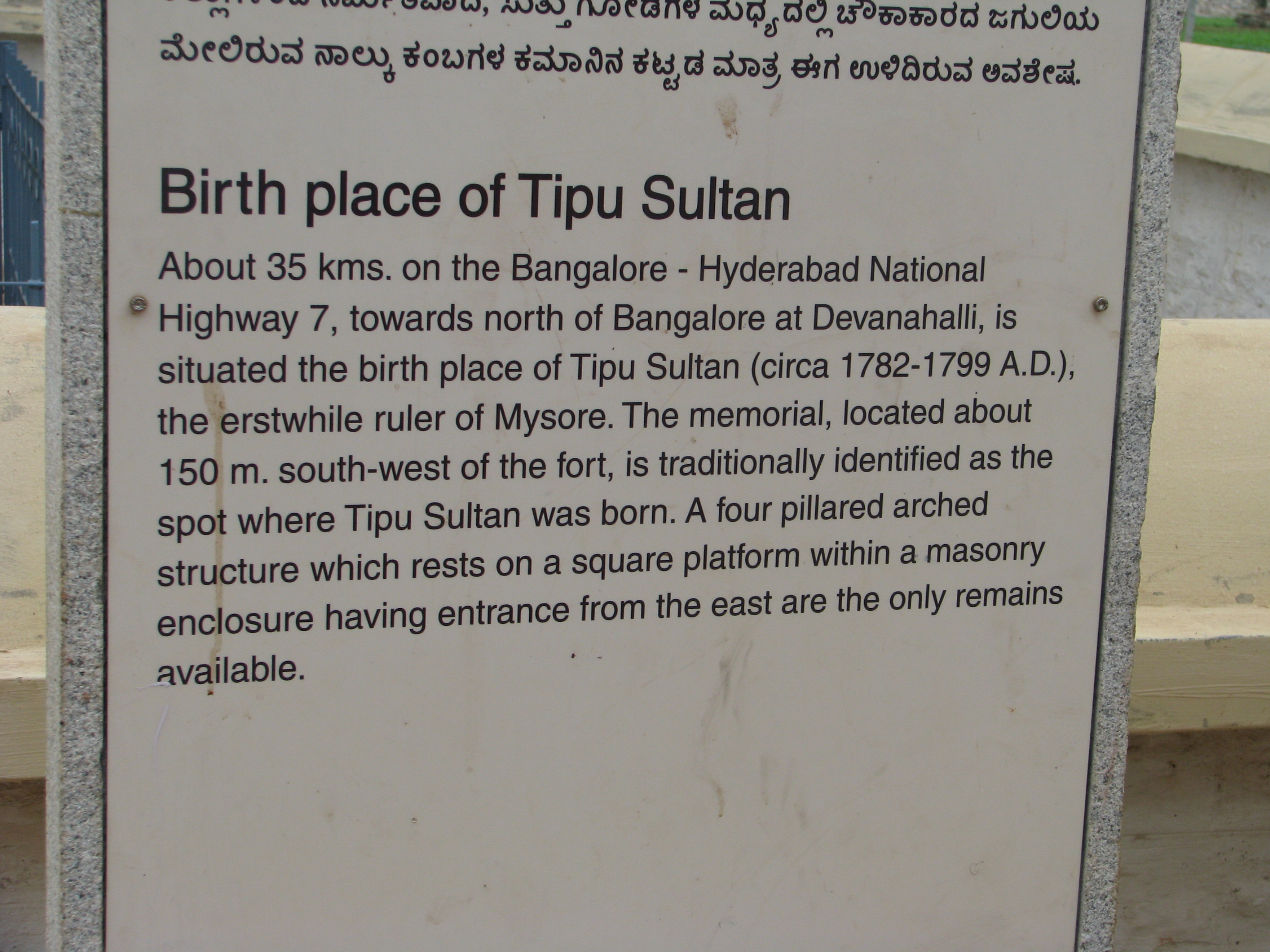

== Tipu's birthplace ==
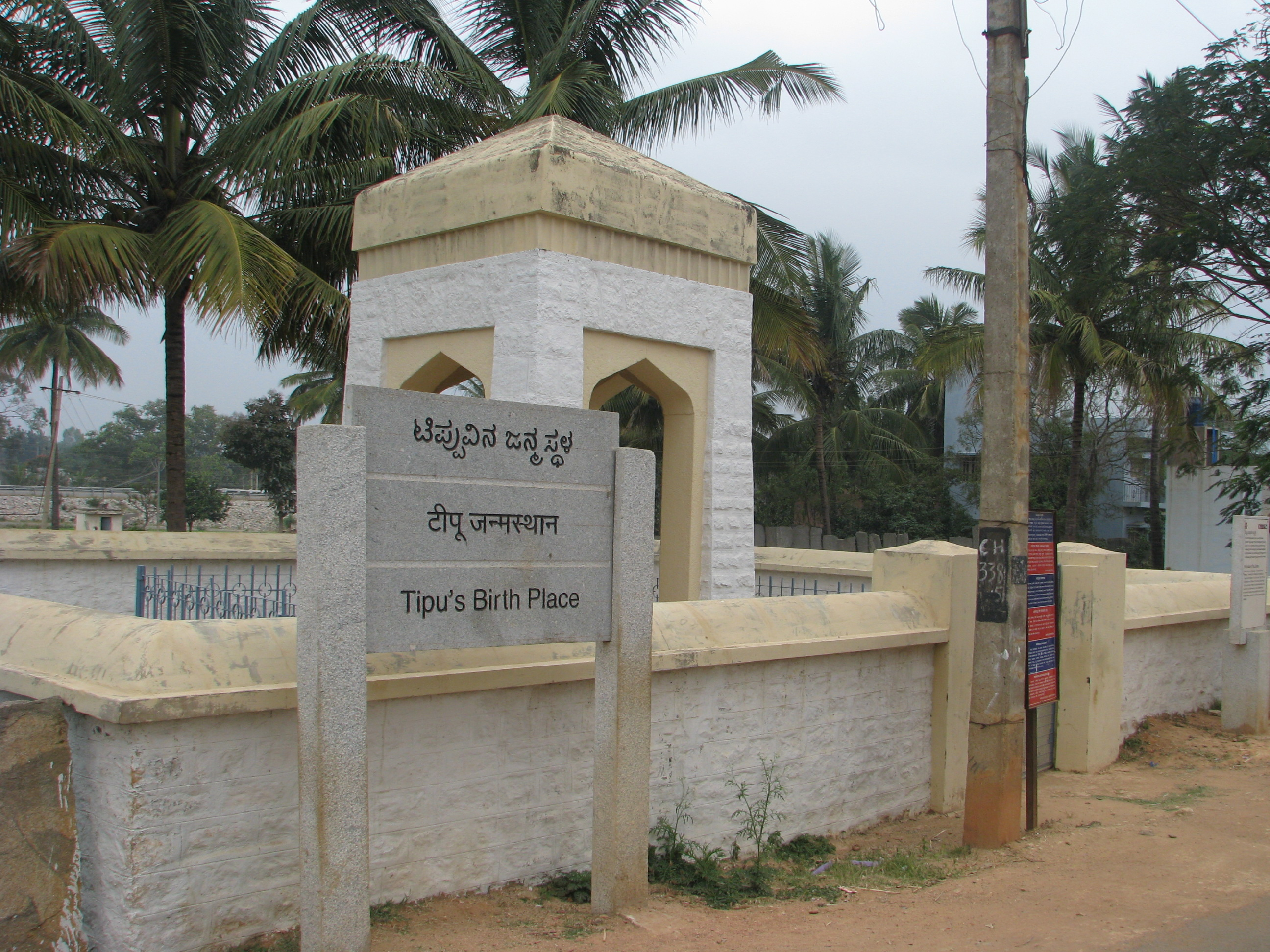

A memorial with a small plaque stands 150 m (160 yd) south-west outside of the fort, stating that Tipu Sultan was born here in 1751. It is about six feet (2 m) tall with a pillared enclosure and square top and bears a stone tablet.

The area around the enclosure is known as Khas Bagh and has a dried up stone pond, banana, tamarind and mango plantations.

== Temples inside the fort ==
=== Kote Venugopalaswamy Temple ===
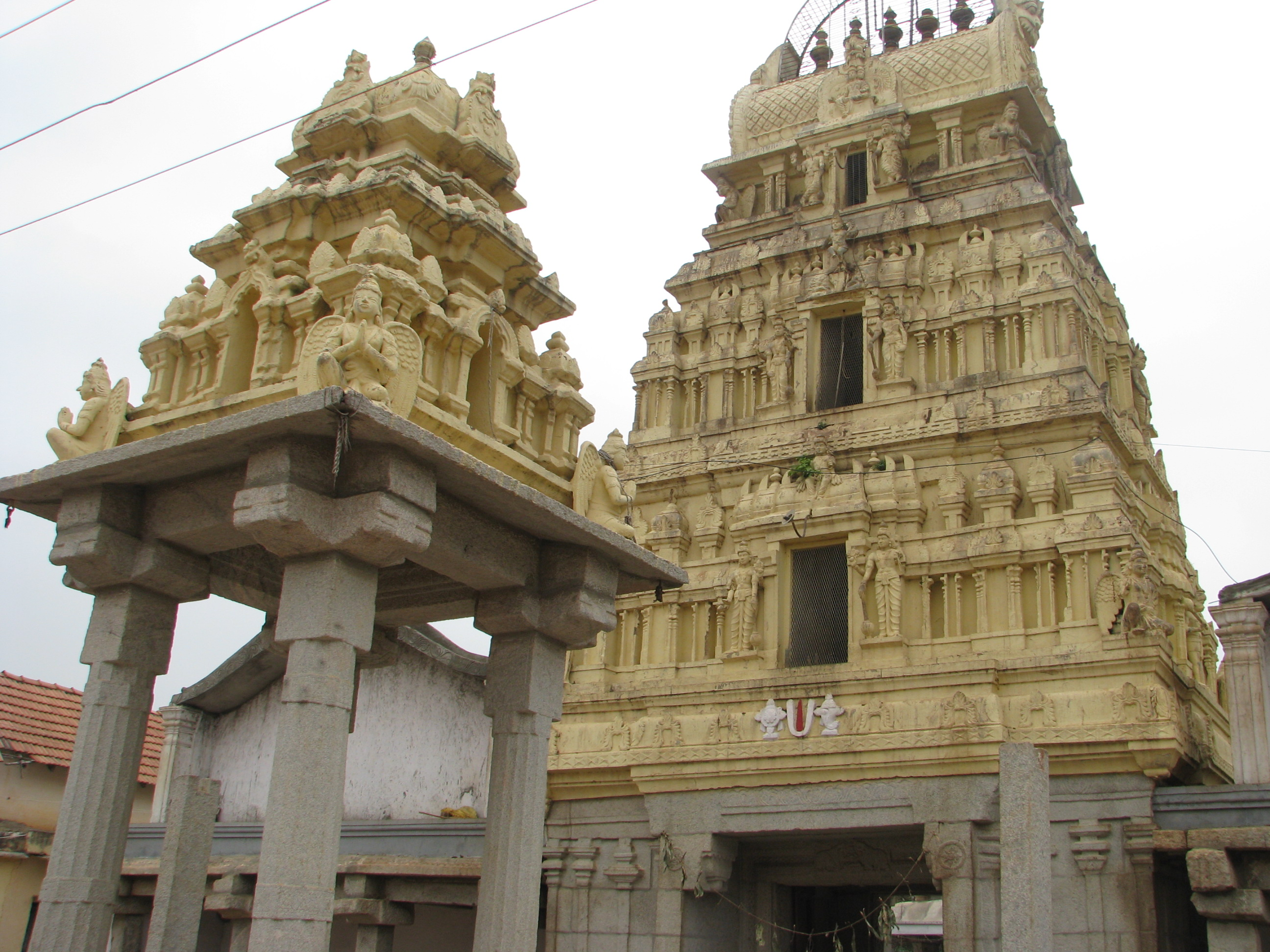
Venugopalaswamy temple

The small town inside the strong walls of Devanahalli fort has many temples. The Venugopalaswamy temple, which faces the main town road is one of the oldest among them. The courtyard, with a Garuda Stamba, is spacious and the walls of the temple depict various scenes from Ramayana and the feats of Lord Krishna as a child, and the pillars have beautiful statues carved on them. The sculptures in this temple is said to be comparable to the temples of Belur and Halebid. On the pillars of the main entrance stand two horsemen with swords unsheathed. The Garbhagriha has a standing Venugopala image of Vijayanagara style. There is a Dravidian style Shikhara over the temple. The Navaranga has four black-stoned pillars carved with fine relief sculptures on all sides, such as hayagriva, dancing female figures with attendant musicians, a conch blower, a kinnara with the lower portion of his body in bird form, a huntress removing a thorn from her leg, etc. A teru is the big chariot used to parade the idol of Gopalaswamy around the town once a year.

=== Siddalingeshwara Temple ===
A few yards away from the Venugopalaswamy temple is Siddalingeshwara temple. Next to this temple is a Raghavendraswamy Mata.

=== Chandramouleshwara Temple ===
Across the street is another age old temple, Chandramouleshwara Temple. It has a spacious inner prakara and is built in Vijayanagara style. The Garbhagriha has a shivalinga, and there are two cells on either side with idols of lord Ganapati and goddess Parvati enshrined respectively.

On the left of the main road stands another temple dedicated to Anjaneya known as Sarovaranjaneya temple.

=== Nanjundeshwara Temple ===
The Nanjundeshwara temple is a small building with two cells in a line and a common navaranga. It is said that this was earlier called Kashi Vishveshwara and is regarded as the oldest temple in the town.

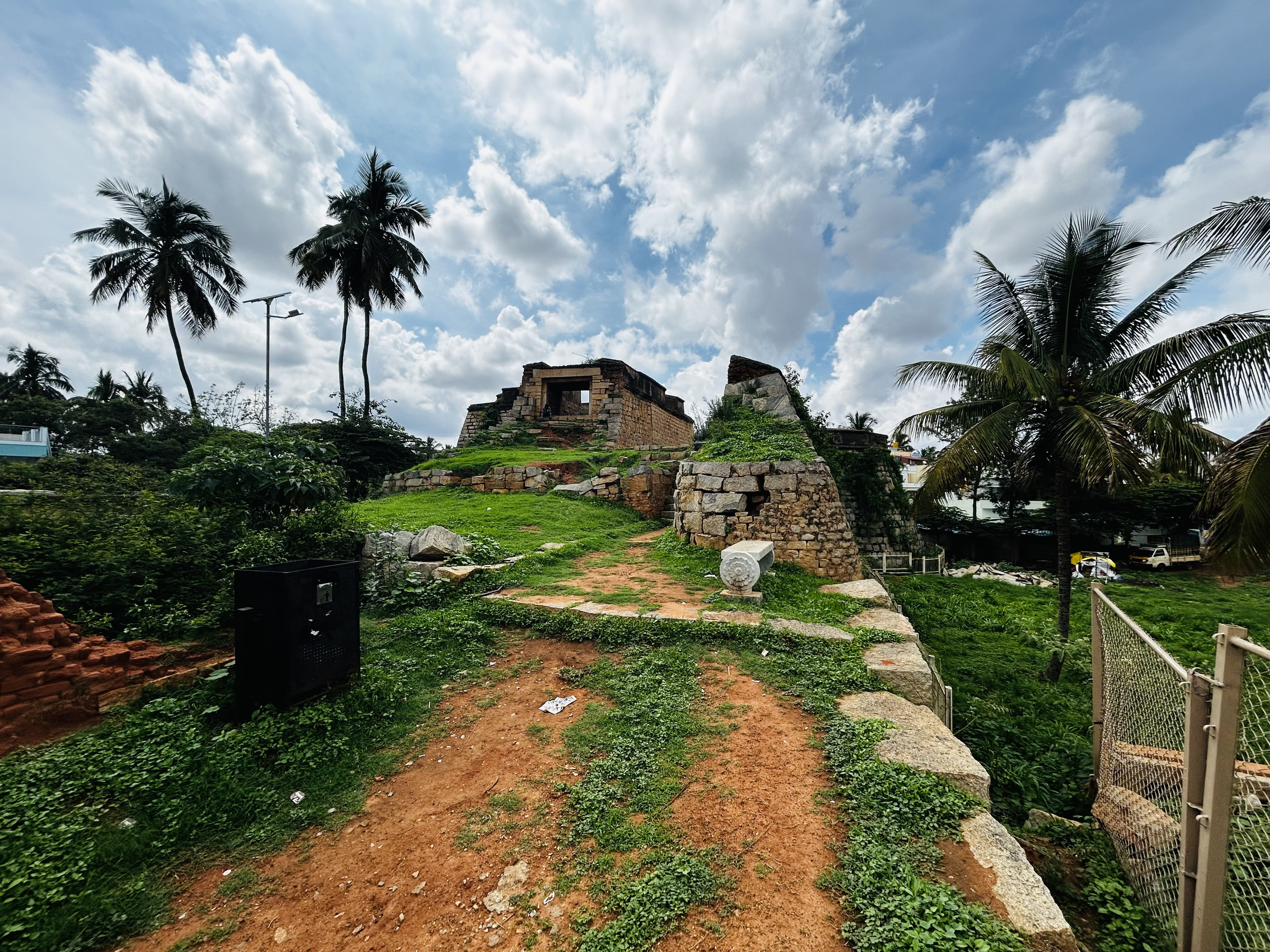
Devanahalli Fort, Bangalore

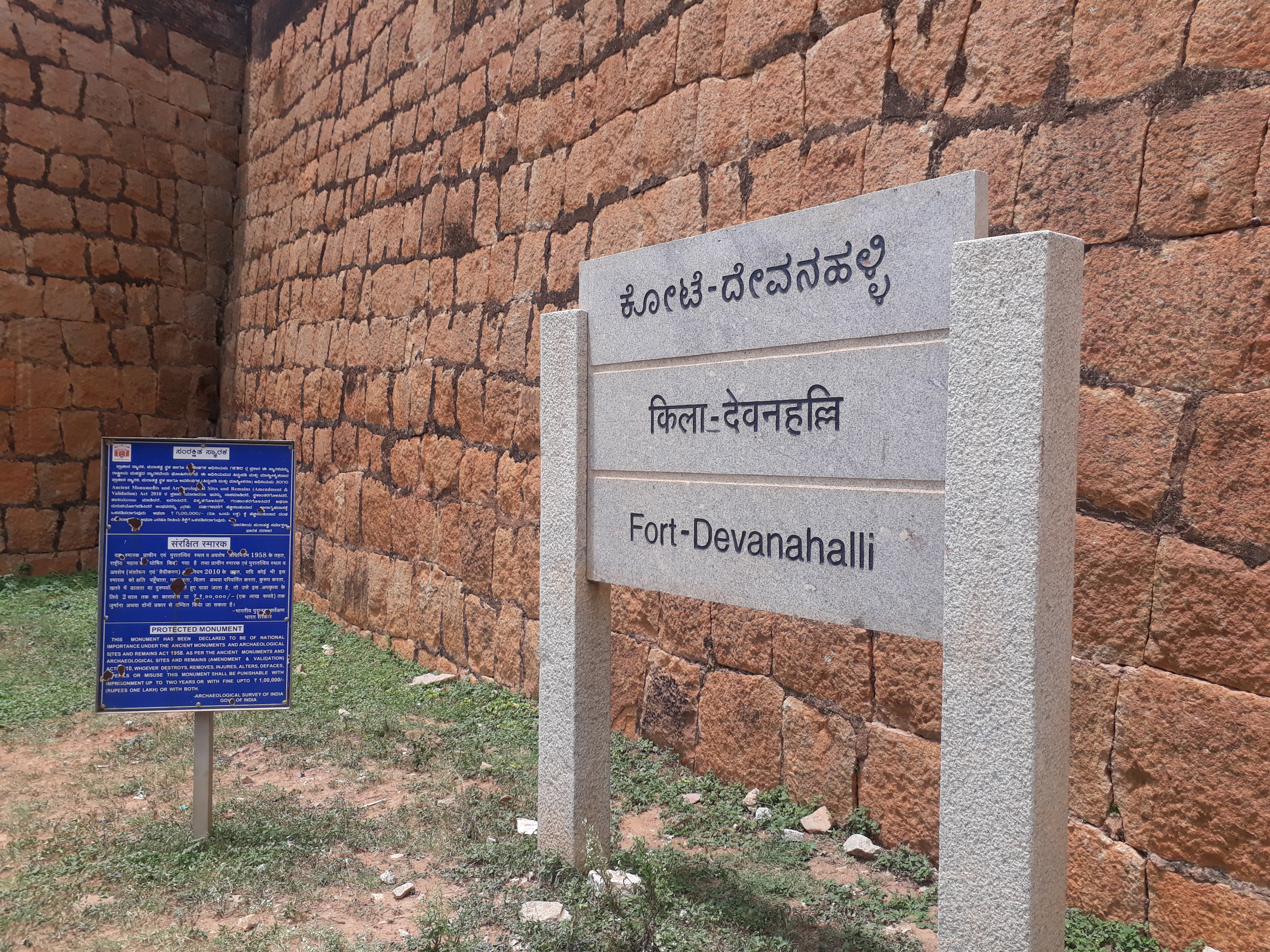
Devanahalli Fort entrance

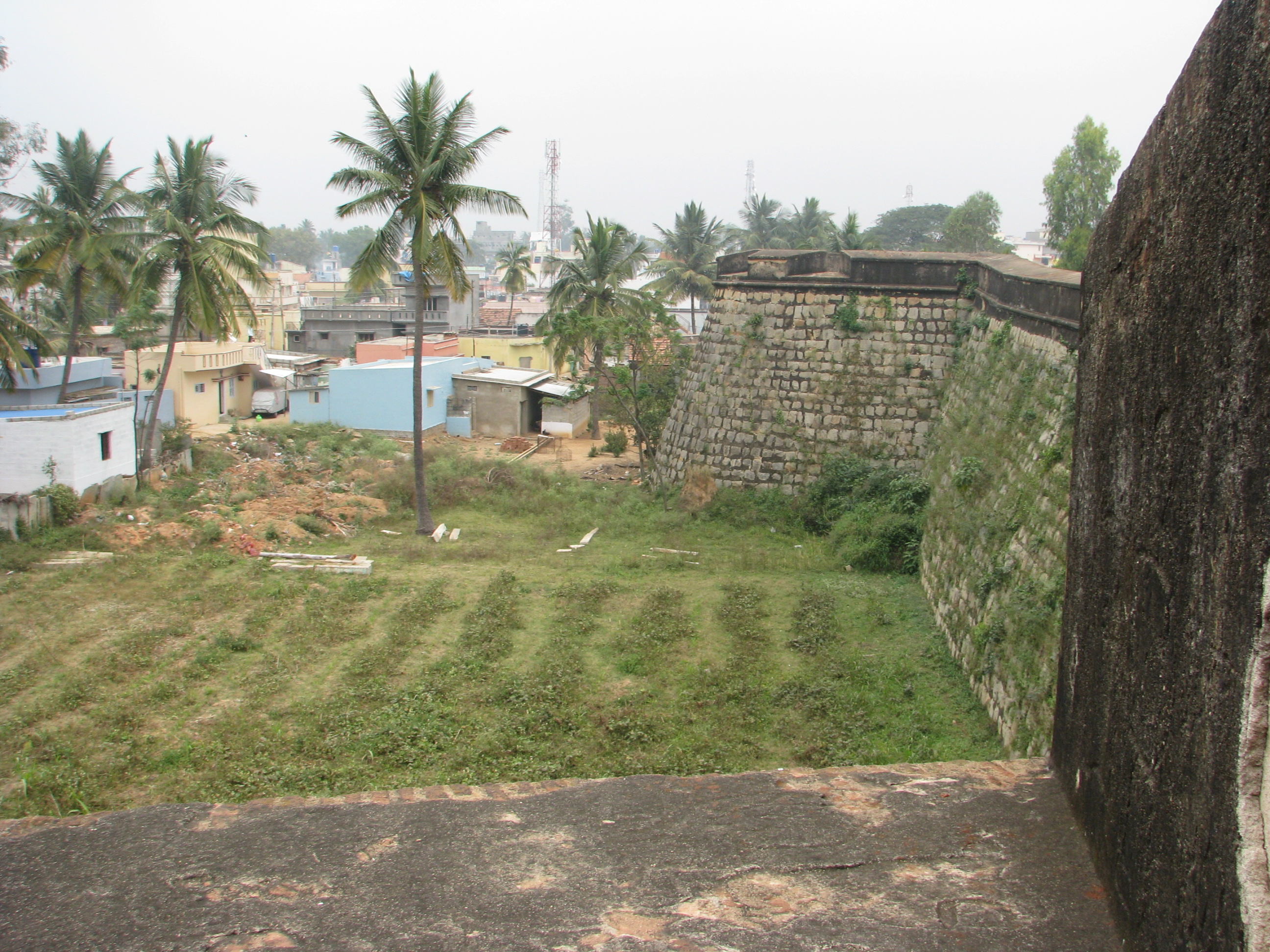
Fort walls

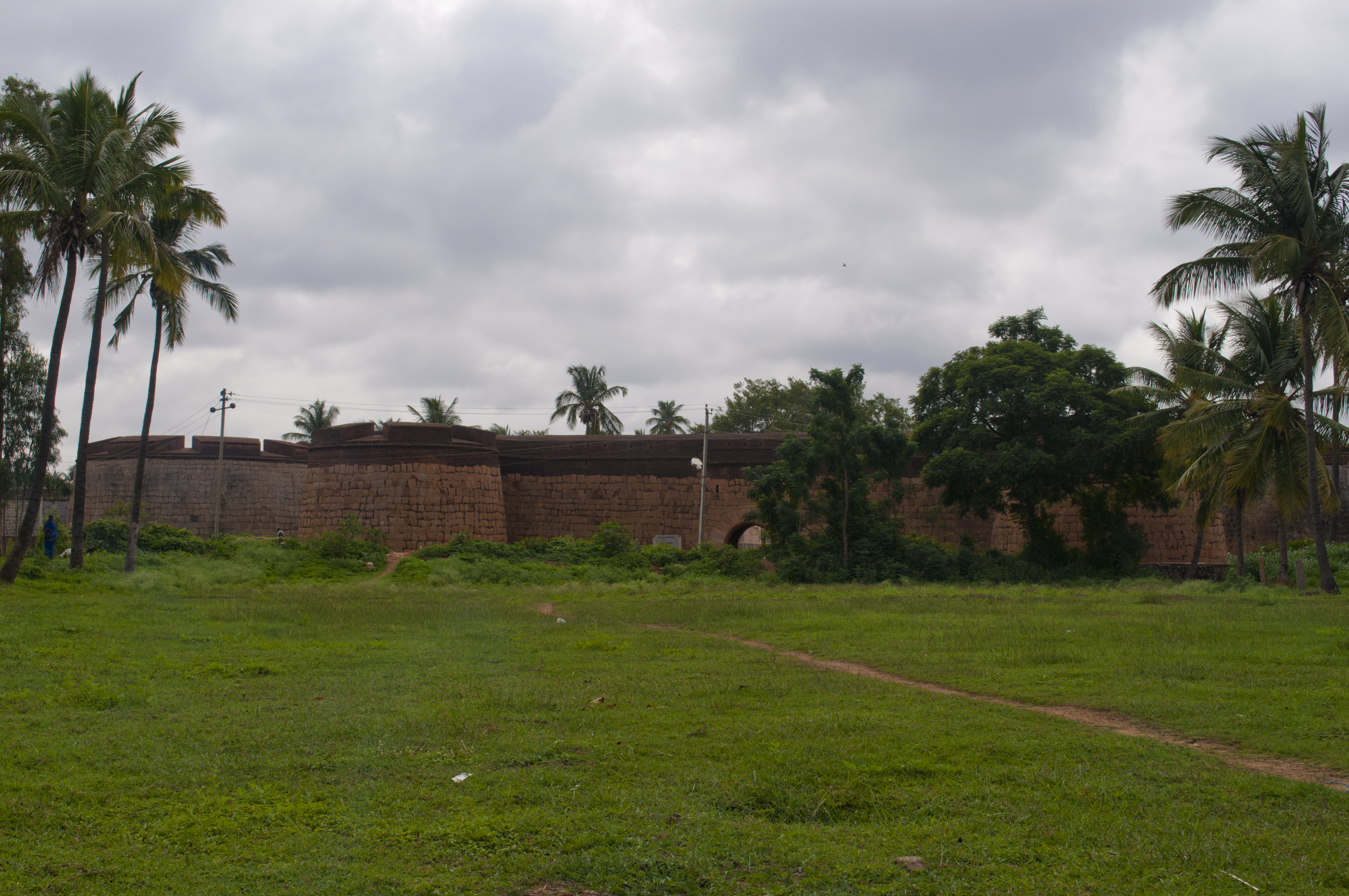
Devenhalli Fort - Panoramic view through SE

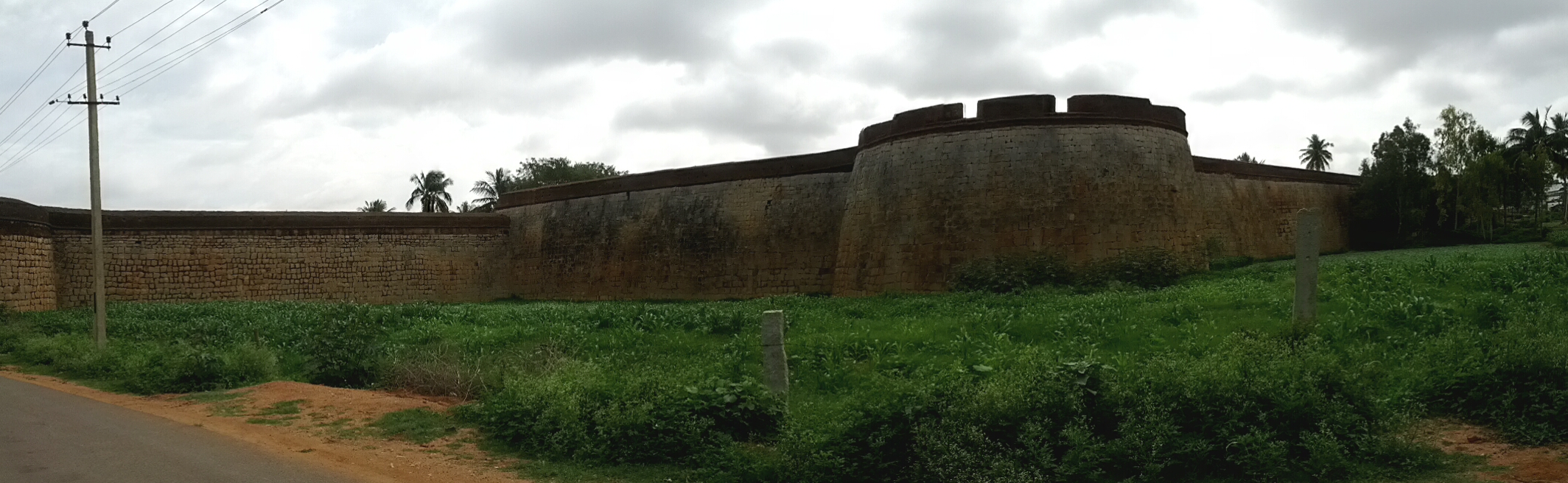
Devenhalli Fort Panorama

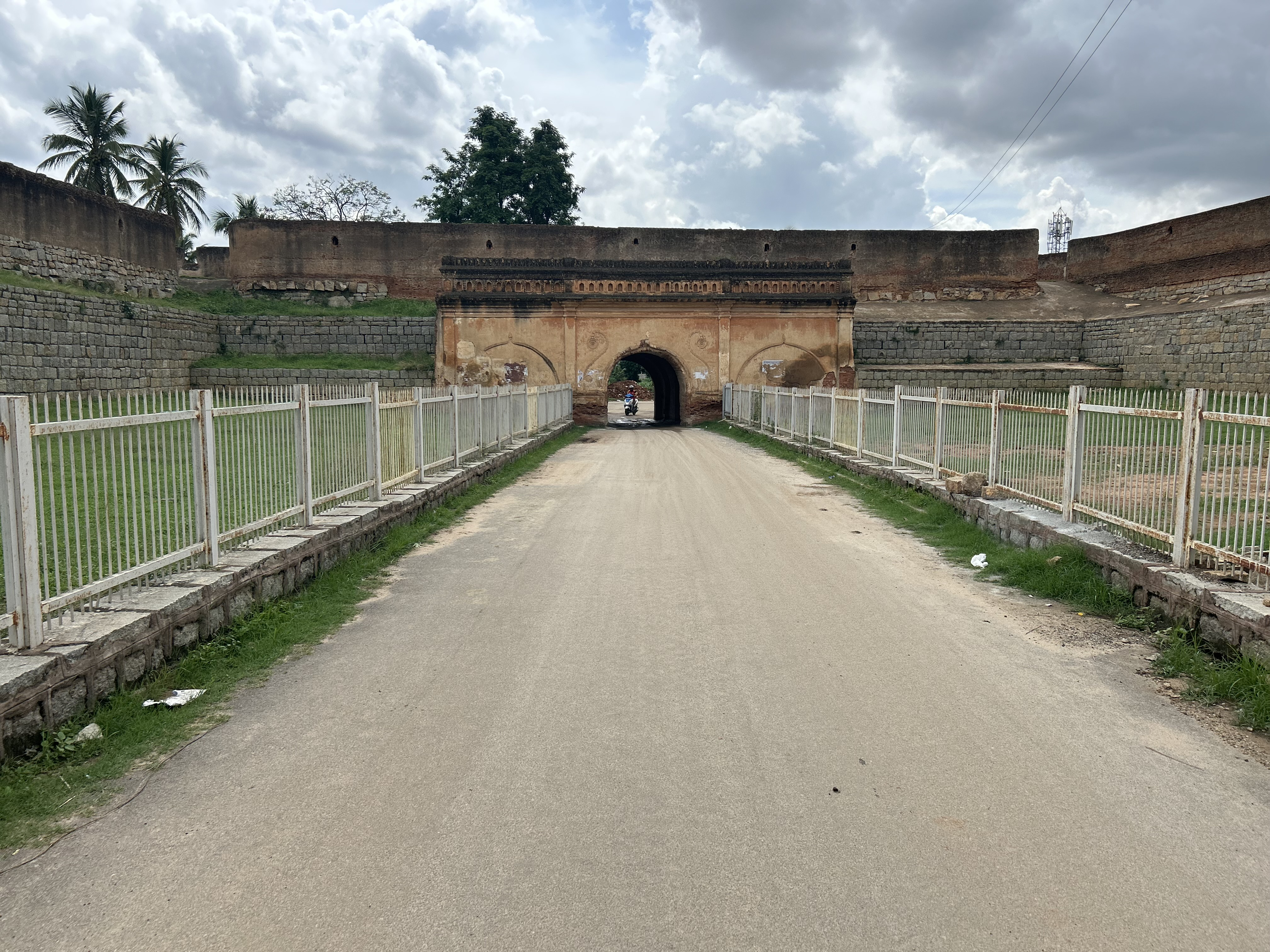
Entrance

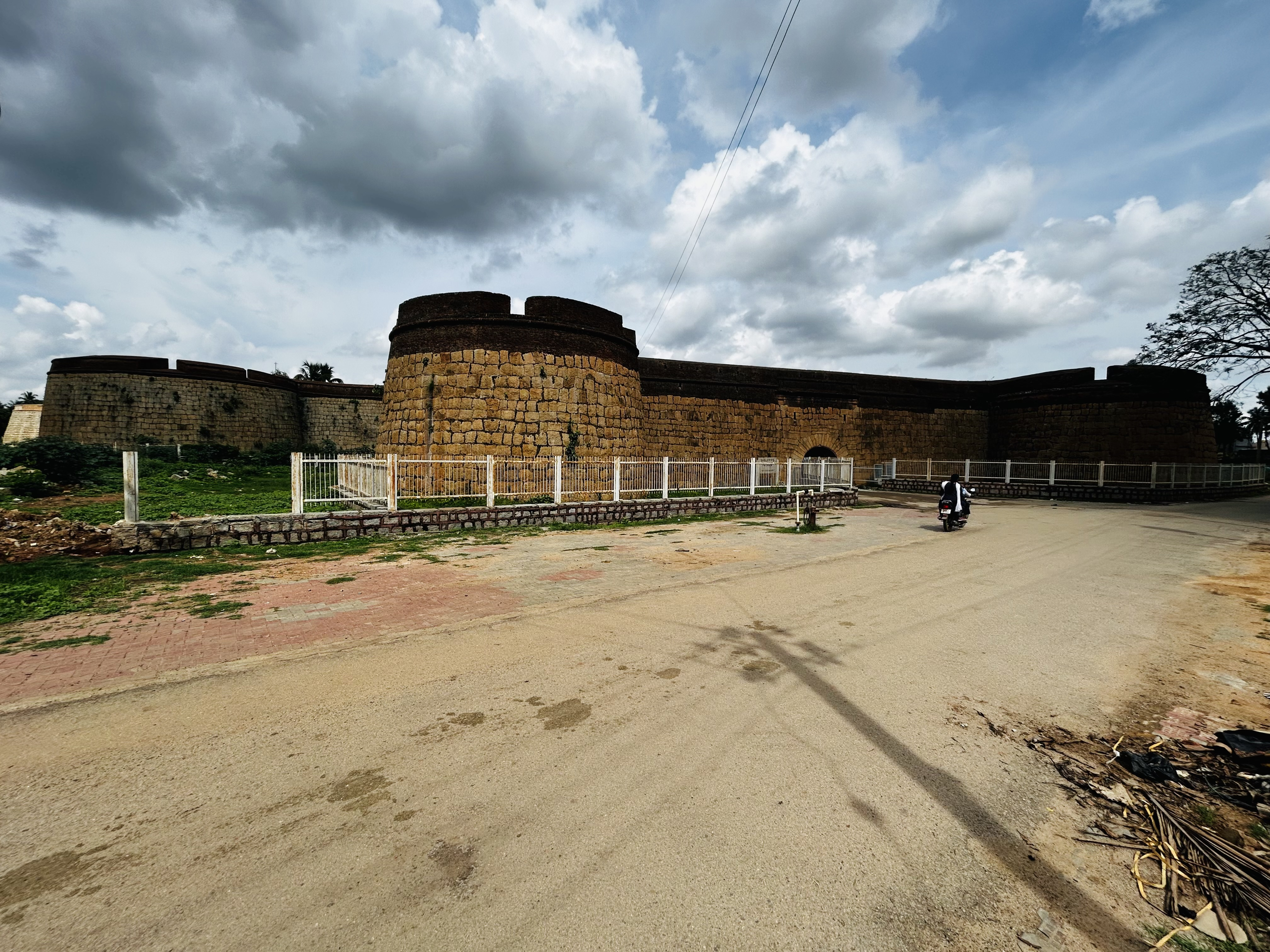
Outer wall view

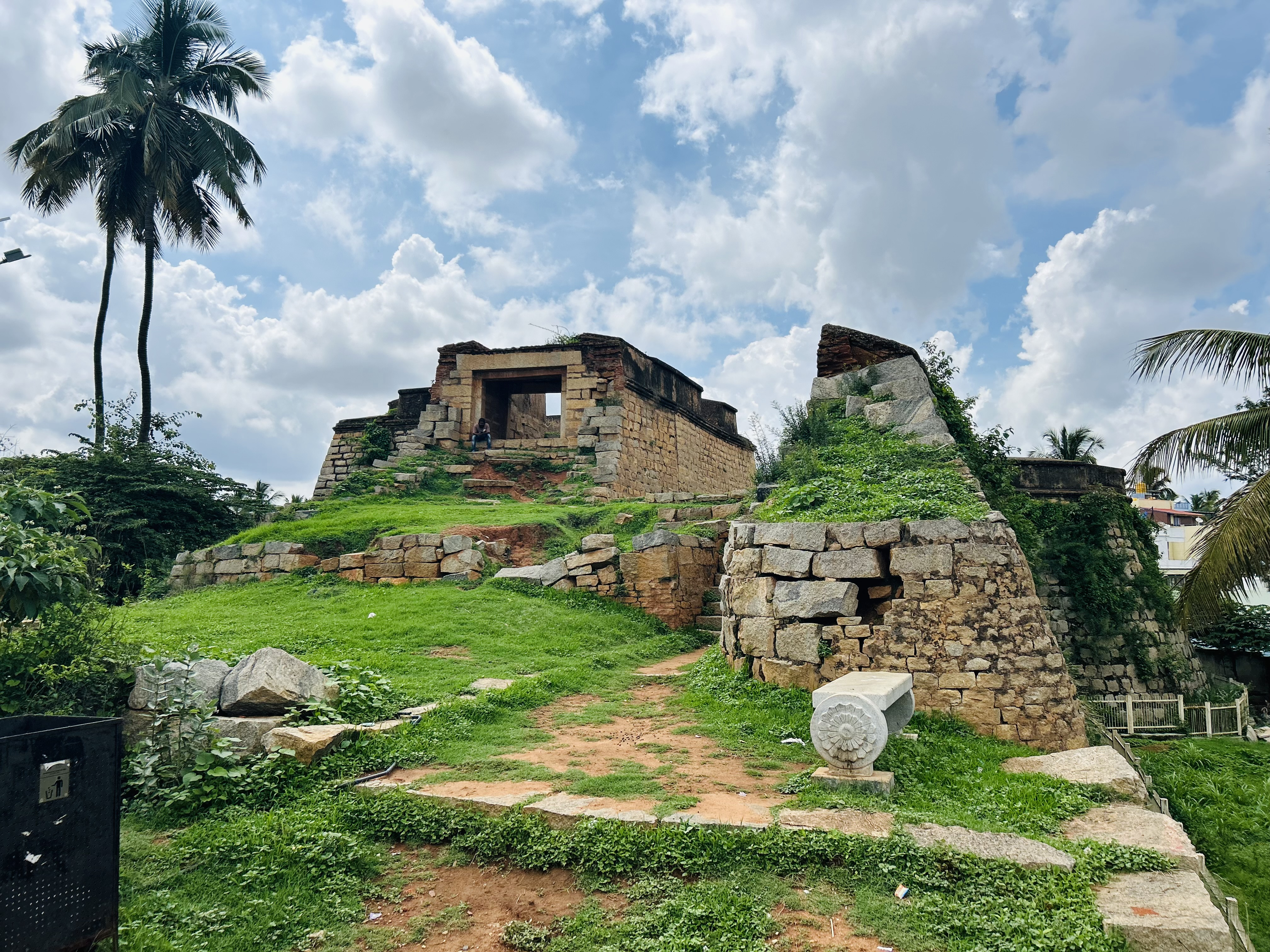
Devanahalli Fort, Bangalore
