= Mallur, Salem =

Mallur
- Panchayat town
- Location in Tamil Nadu, India
- Coordinates: 11.55°N 78.13°E
- Country: India
- State: Tamil Nadu
- District: Salem

Area
  - Total: 10.24 km^{2} (3.95 sq mi)

Population (2011)
  - Total: 10,331
  - Density: 1,009/km^{2} (2,613/sq mi)

Languages
  - Official: Tamil
- Time zone: UTC+5:30 (IST)

Mallur is a panchayat town in Salem taluk of Salem district in the Indian state of Tamil Nadu. It is one of the 31 panchayat towns in the district. Spread across an area of 10.24 km^{2} (3.95 sq mi), it had a population of 10,331 individuals as per the 2011 census.

== Geography and administration ==
Mallur is located in Salem taluk of Salem district in the Indian state of Tamil Nadu. Spread across an area of 10.24 km^{2} (3.95 sq mi), it is one of the 31 panchayat towns in the district. The region has a tropical climate with hot summers and mild winters. The highest temperatures are recorded in April and May, with lowest recordings in December-January. Mallur is served by Mallur Railway Station located on the Salem–Karur railway line of the Southern Railway zone.

The town panchayat is sub-divided into 15 wards. It is headed by a chairperson, who is elected by the members, who are chosen through direct elections. The town forms part of the Vazhapadi Assembly constituency that elects its member to the Tamil Nadu legislative assembly and the Salem Lok Sabha constituency that elects its member to the Parliament of India.

== Demographics ==
As per the 2011 census, Mallur had a population of 10,331 individuals across 2,754 households. The population saw a marginal increase compared to the previous census in 2001 when 9,503 inhabitants were registered. The population consisted of 5,112 males and 5,219 females. About 957 individuals were below the age of six years. About 26% of the population belonged to scheduled castes. The entire population is classified as urban. The town has an average literacy rate of 75.6%.

About 46.8% of the eligible population were employed, of which majority were involved in agriculture and allied activities. Hinduism was the majority religion which was followed by 99% of the population, with Christianity (0.1%) and Islam (0.7%) being minor religions.
