= Devanahalli =

Devanahalli Devanadoddi
- Town
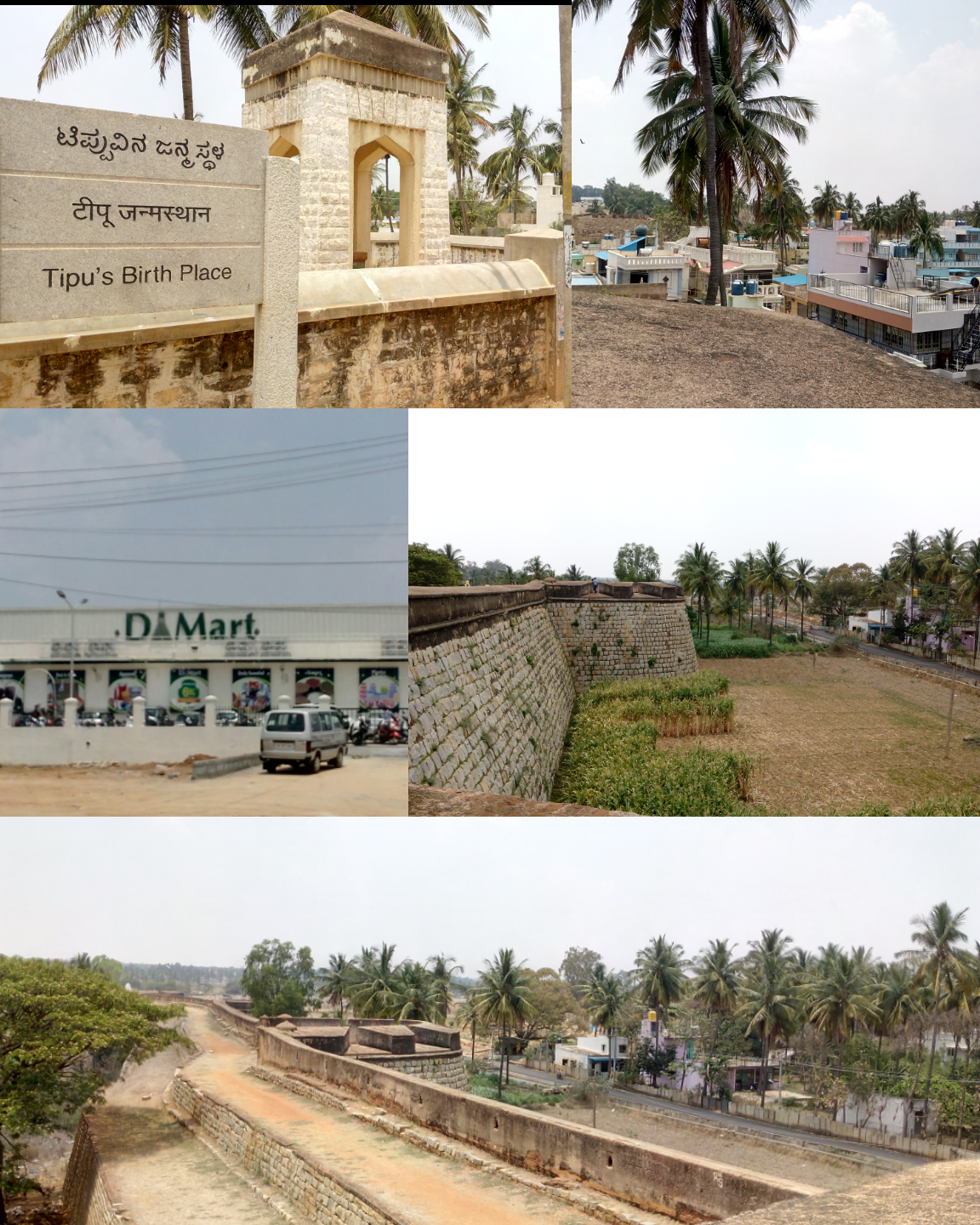
- Devanahalli Montage Clockwise from Top to Bottom: Tipu Sultan Birthplace, Town view from the fort, Fort walls outside view, Inside fort view, Dmart Store

- Location in Karnataka, India Devanahalli (India)
- Coordinates: 13.23°N 77.7°E
- Country: India
- State: Karnataka
- District: Bengaluru North District

Government
  - Body: Devanahalli Town Municipal Council (Note: Devanahalli is governed by the Devanahalli Town Municipal Council (TMC). It is not part of the Bruhat Bengaluru Mahanagara Palike (BBMP). The TMC was established in 1938.)
  - Member of the Legislative Assembly - Karnataka Legislative Assembly: K. H. Muniyappa, MLA
  - Deputy Commissioner: Basavaraju A.B, IAS

Area
  - Town: 16 km^{2} (6.2 sq mi)
  - Rural: 413 km^{2} (159 sq mi)

Population (2011)
  - Town: 28,051
  - Density: 1,800/km^{2} (4,500/sq mi)
  - Rural: 146,705

Languages
  - Official: Kannada
- Time zone: UTC+5:30 (IST)
- PIN: 562110
- Vehicle registration: KA-43
- Website: http://www.devanahallitown.mrc.gov.in

Devanahalli, also called "Devandahalli", "Dyaavandalli", Devanadoddi, and Devanapura, is a town and satellite town of Bengaluru in Bengaluru North District (Note: On July 2, 2025, the Government of Karnataka officially renamed Bangalore Rural district as Bengaluru North District.) in the state of Karnataka in India. The town is located next to Nandi Hills (Note: Devanahalli is 19.9 km to Nandi Hills, India.) and 40 kilometres (25 mi) to the north-east of Bengaluru.

Devanahalli is the site of Kempegowda International Airport. A multibillion-dollar Devanahalli Business Park with two IT Parks are coming up on nearly 400 acres (1.6 km^{2}) adjoining the airport. An Aerospace Park, Science Park and a ₹10 billion (US$110 million) Financial City are also coming up. A new satellite ring road will connect the city with Doddaballapur. Devanahalli is situated near the upcoming ₹1,500 billion (US$16 billion), 12,000-acre (49 km^{2}) BIAL IT Investment Region, to be the largest IT region in India.

Total infrastructure development in the area is estimated to be well over ₹20,450 billion (US$220 billion) over the next two years. With significant commercial and residential development in the area, real estate is in high demand in the region. Devanahalli is the birthplace of Tipu Sultan, popularly known as the "Tiger of Mysore".

Devanahalli is considered the de facto capital of Bengaluru North District.

== History ==
Devanahalli was part of Gangawadi and later came under the rule of Rashatrakutas, Nolambas, Pallavas, Cholas, Hoysalas and the Vijayanagara rulers.

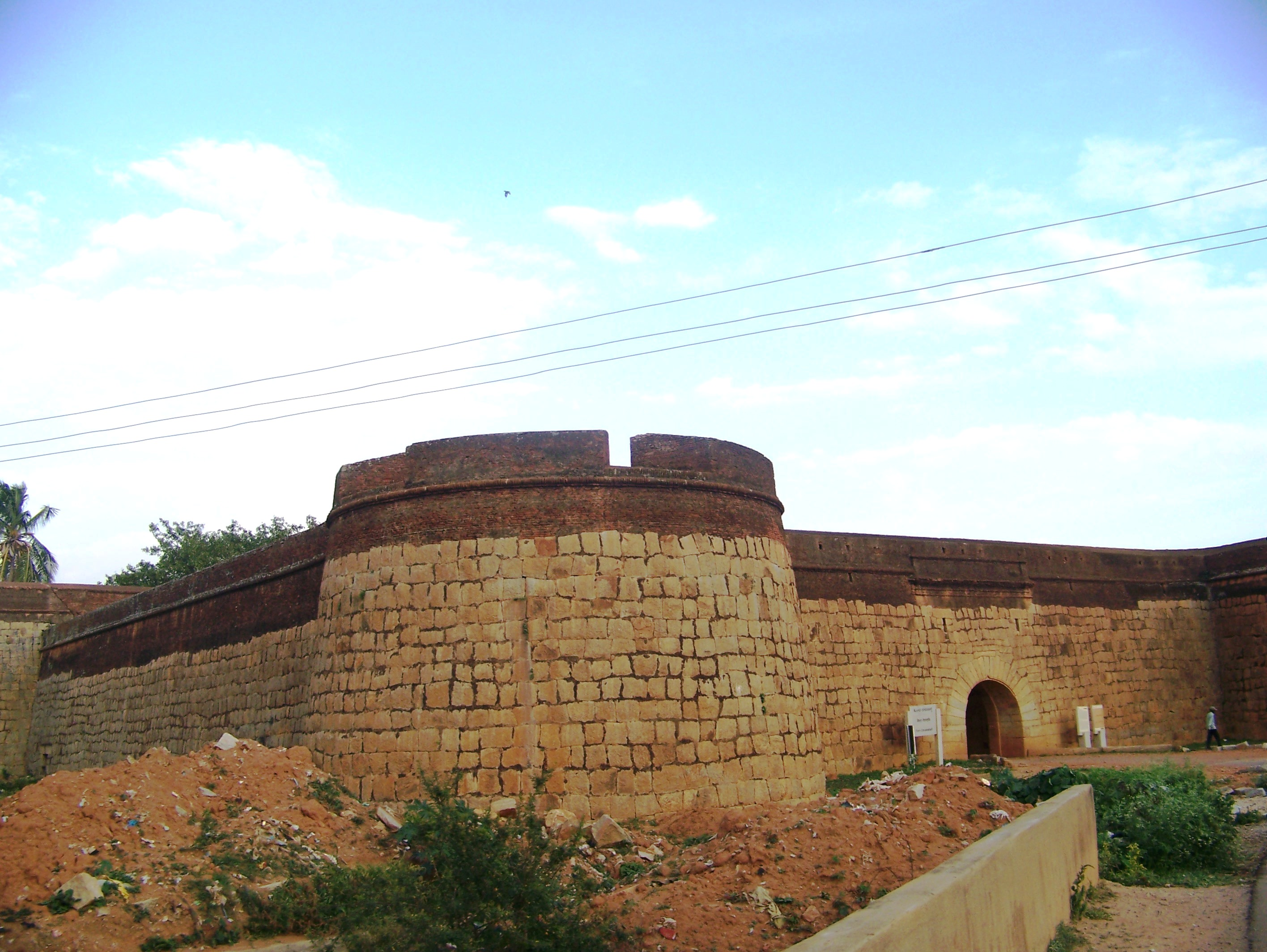
The Devanahalli Fort

The recent history of Devanahalli dates back to 15th-century, when a family of refugees fleeing from Conjeevaram (today Kanchipuram) camped near the foot of Ramaswami Hills, east of Nandi Hills. Their leader Rana Baire Gowda was apparently directed in a dream to set up a settlement in this region. His Morasu Wokkalu family and he subsequently settled in a small village, Ahuti, which was later known as Avati. His son Malla Baire Gowda founded Devanahalli, Chikkaballapur and Doddaballapura. Kempe Gowda I, the founder of Bangalore, also belonged to the Morasu Wokkalu family. During the time of Vijayanagara rule, Malla Baire constructed the initial mud fort in 1501 with the consent of Devaraya, the headman of the village Devanadoddi that stood prior to their arrival, and named it Devanhalli or Devandhalli. A series of rulers from the same family ruled Devanahalli, the longest being Dodda Baire Gauda, for 54 years.

In 1747, the fort passed onto the hands of Kingdom of Mysore under the command of Nanja Raja. Taken over soon after by Hyder Ali, it was here that his son Tipu Sultan was born. Ali rebuilt the fort, using stone in the form of an oval, flanked with circular bastions and two cavaliers on the eastern face. It was incomplete when it fell during the siege by Lord Cornwallis as part of the Third Anglo-Mysore War in 1791.

=== 21st century ===
==== Manufacturing and industrial complex ====
In 2023, Foxconn bought 300 acres of land in Devanahalli and has invested ₹21,911 crore (US$2.3 billion) for creating a manufacturing facility. Boeing has bought 43 acres of land in Devanahalli and has invested ₹1,600 crore (US$170 million) and is largest site for Boeing outside the United States.

Amazon (India)'s corporate headquarters has been relocated to Devanahalli and is expected to commence in April 2025 and conclude by April 2026. Walmart Inc. has leased 1.01 lakh sq ft for ts Global capability center in Devanahalli and will commence in March 2026.

==== World Trade Center ====
In addition to World Trade Center Bangalore, another upcoming World Trade Center is being built in Devanahalli which will be spread across 74 acres and is likely to open in year 2027.

==== Defence complex ====
The original proposal for an aerospace and defence park was planned for over 1,777 acres of land across 13 villages of the district in Devanahalli. However, due to farmers protests for three and a half years, the proposal was dropped by Government of Karnataka in July 2025. However, the 449 acres the land is available for sale and setting up defence. Karnataka declared 1,777 acres in Devanahalli as a Permanent Special Agricultural Zone.

An Astronaut Training and Biomedical Engineering Centre is being planned to be established on proposed site of 140 acres (0.57 km^{2}) to train astronauts for India's human spaceflight program. There is a planned defence electronics manufacturing, with major activities planned at the Aerospace Park.

== Tech Parks ==
- Prestige Tech Cloud Park
- Brigade Industrial Park
- KIADB Aerospace Park
- Bengaluru Signature Business Park

== Government ==
The Devanahalli Assembly constituency is one of the constituencies in the Karnataka Legislative Assembly. The Deputy Commissioner's Office is located on National Highway 648 (India), midway between Doddaballapura (11 km) and Devanahalli (12 km), in a village called Vishwanathapura.

=== Civic Utilities ===
The region of Devanahalli, renowned as the birthplace of Tipu Sultan, has long struggled with water scarcity. The town gets its water from 100-odd borewells dug around the town, with Sihineerukere lake as the source of water. The town faced water shortage as 32 borewells in the town had dried up, and Devanahalli MC resorted to hiring water tankers. However, Devanahalli has begun utilising Bengaluru's treated wastewater blended with rainwater in two of its lakes to supply 0.2 million litres of water per day to households.

== Infrastructure ==
KIAL Terminals is an upcoming underground eastern terminal metro station on the East-West corridor of the Blue Line of Namma Metro in Bangalore, India.

== Sports ==
A new facility named BCCI Centre of Excellence (formerly known as National Cricket Academy) has been opened in Devanahalli on 45 acres of land, featuring 45 pitches and 16,000 sq ft gym. A new sports city is being made by Government of Karnataka on 60-acres.

== Demographics ==
As of 2001 India census, Devanahalli had a population of 23,190. Males constituted 52% of the population and females 48%. Devanahalli had an average literacy rate of 66%, higher than the national average of 59.5%: male literacy was 73% and female literacy was 58%. In Devanahalli, 12% of the population was under 6 years of age.

According to the 2011 Census of India, Devanahalli had a total population of 209,622, with a sex ratio of 944 females per 1,000 males and a literacy rate of 75–80%. The population was predominantly rural, with approximately 70% residing in rural areas and 30% in urban settlements.

Religion in Devanahalli
Religion	Percent
Hinduism	91.44%
Islam	7.82%
Christianity	0.48%
Sikhism	0.03%
Buddhist	0.06%
Jainism	0.06%
Other Religions	0.01%
No Religion Specified	0.01%

== Tourism ==
Devanahalli is just an hour's drive from Bangalore. There has been a growth of tourist traffic recently due to the impetus provided by the Bangalore International Airport.

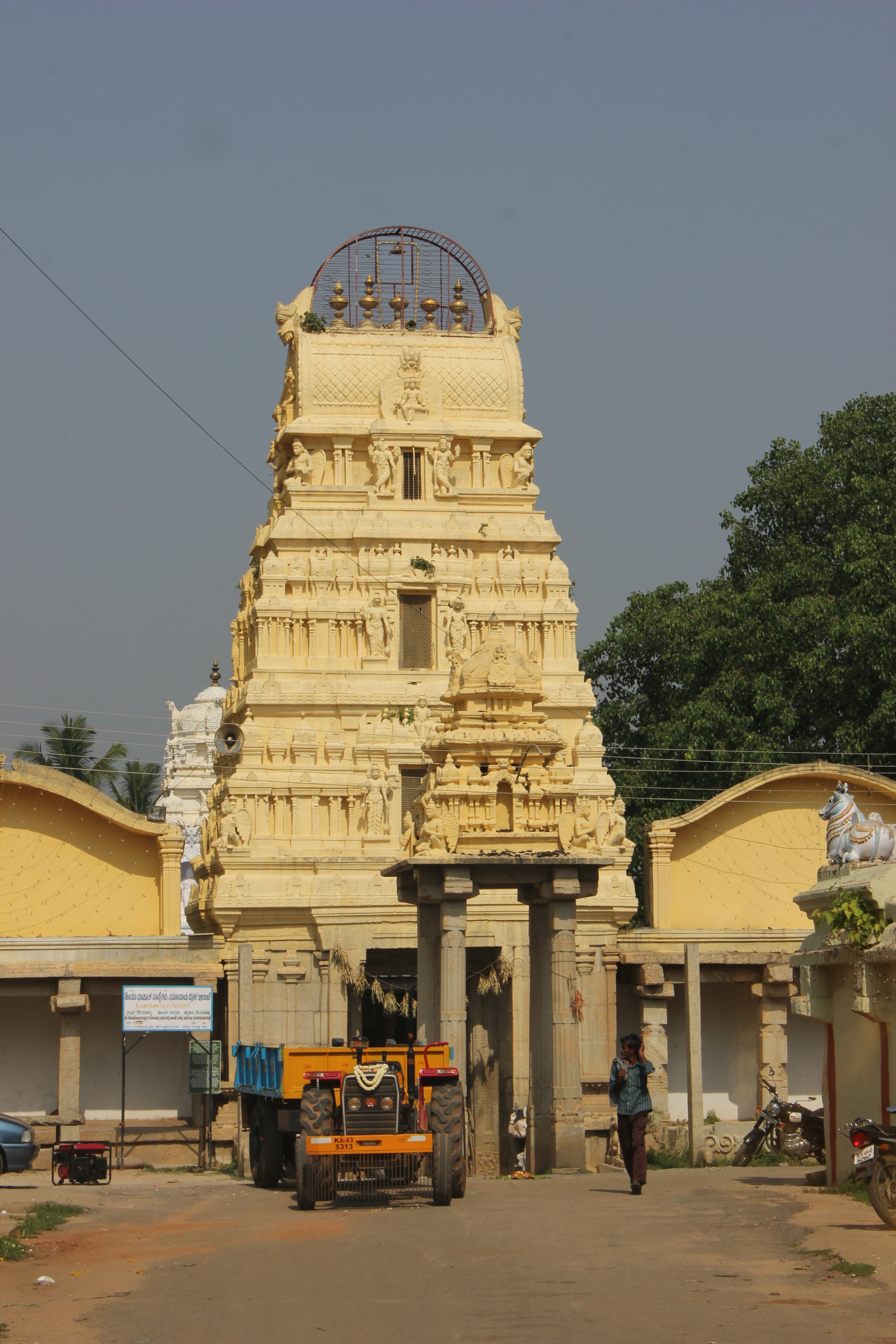
Venugopalaswamy (Vishnu) temple in Devanahalli fort belongs to post-Vijayanagara Empire period

=== Devanahalli Fort ===
Devanahalli Fort is among the most visited heritage sites in the region. Spread over 20 acres, the granite-walled fortification features 12 semi-circular bastions, ornate cut-plasterwork at its east and west entrances, and several ancient temples within its complex. The Venugopala Swamy Temple, regarded as the oldest structure inside the fort, and the Tipu Sultan birthplace memorial are the two most prominent points of interest for visitors. The fort is a protected monument under the Archaeological Survey of India.

=== Kote Venugopasla Swamy Temple ===
There are numerous temples within the fort with impeccable architecture. Of all the temples, the Venugopala Swami Temple is the most visited and the oldest. Built in the Dravidian style, the courtyard is spacious and features a Garuda Stamba. The walls of the temple depict various scenes from Ramayana and Krishna's childhood, and the four black-stone pillars have fine relief sculptures including Hayagriva, dancing figures, and a Kinnara carved on them, comparable in quality to the temples of Belur and Halebidu. The temple is a protected monument under Archaeological Survey of India.

=== Other temples ===
Nearby Siddhalingeshwara swami temple is equally popular. Chandramouleshwara temple, Koote Maramma temple, Chikkeray Anjaneya swamy temple, Nanjundeshwara temple, Veerabhadraswami temple, Ranganathaswamy temple, Kalamma temple, Raghavendraswamy matha, Mahantha Matha, Balagopala (old), Nagareshwara, Basaveshwara, Jain temples are other places of worship.

There is a large pond known as Sarovara said to have been built by Deewan Purnaiah of Mysore kingdom and the Anjaneya in the Shrine near to it is called Sarovaranjaneya.

=== Birth place of Tipu Sultan ===
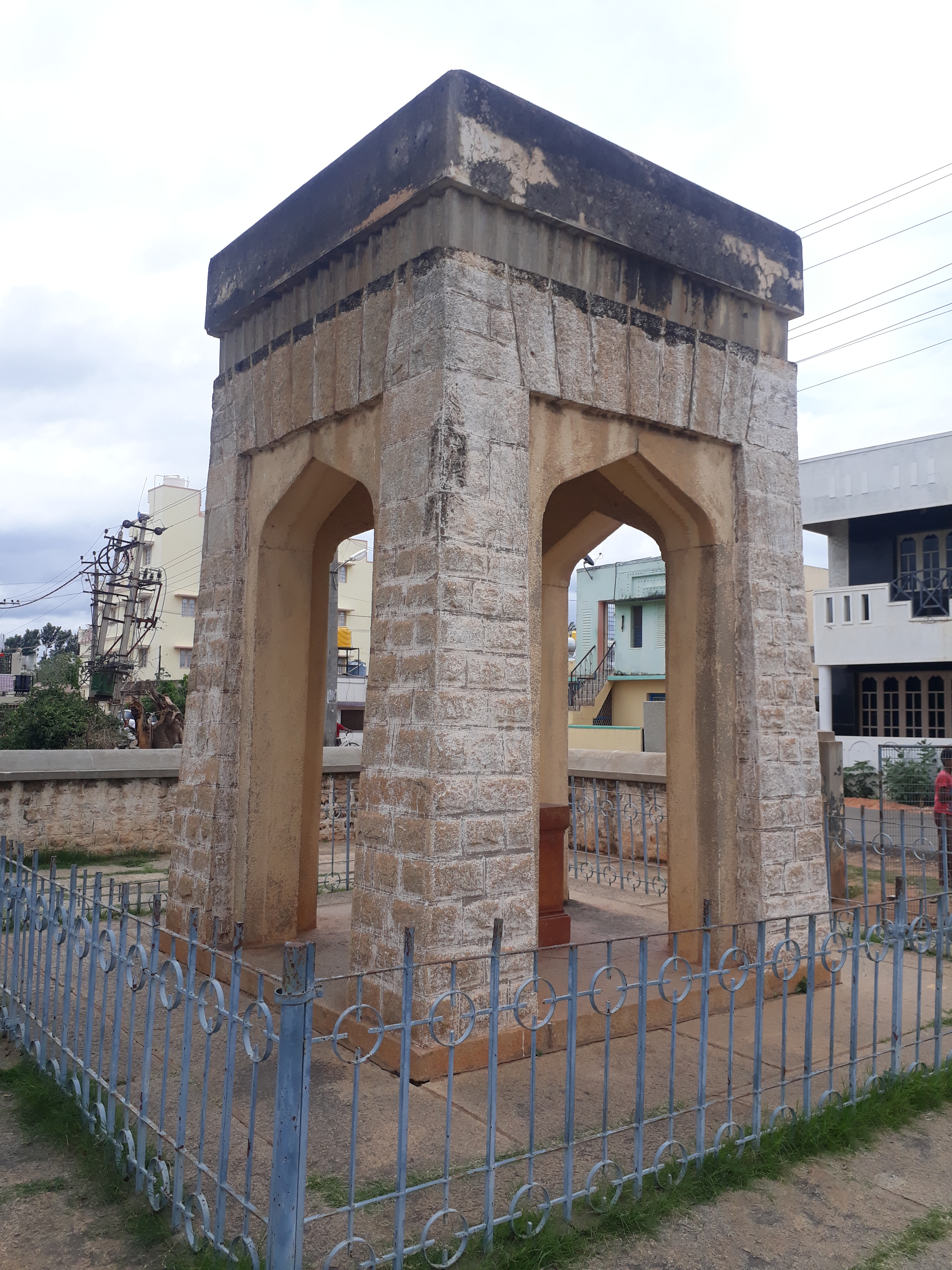
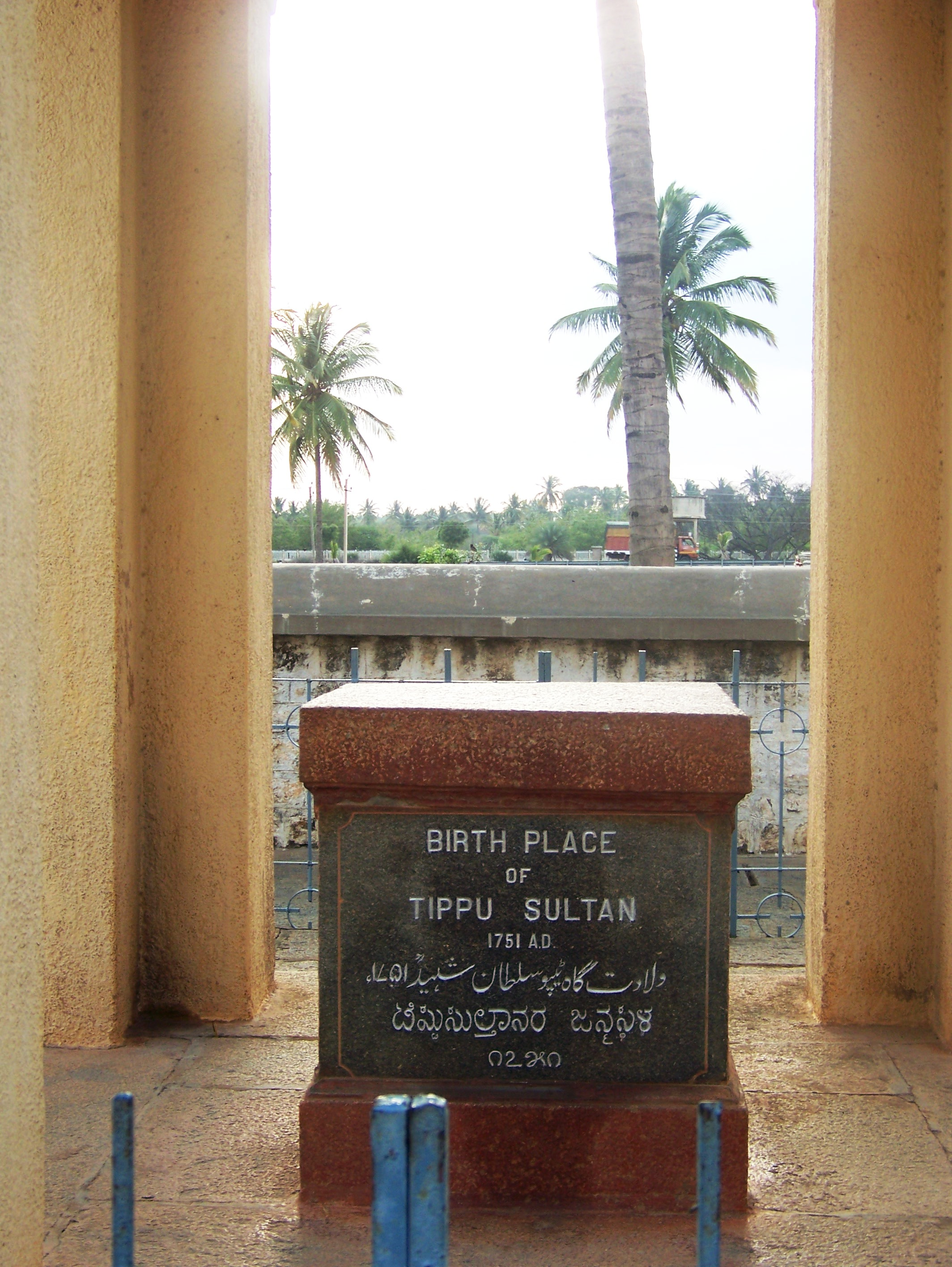
The birth place of Sultan of Mysore Tipu Sultan and the site protected by Archaeological Survey of India.

Within the fort, there is the house in which Haider Ali and Tipu Sultan called home, where Tipu was born. There is a memorial now at the birthplace of Tipu Sultan little outside the fort. It is about six feet tall with a pillared enclosure and square top and bears a stone tablet. It has an enclosure. The area called Khas Bagh, now contains many tamarind trees, a few mango trees, and a small dried pond. It was once an enchanting spot, being Tipu's private park.

== Airport ==
=== Kempegowda International Airport ===
==== Terminal 1 ====
The terminal 1 of KIA was designed by Hellmuth, Obata + Kassabaum (HOK) and constructed by Larsen & Toubro. The Kempegowda International Airport, which opened on 24 May 2008, is approximately 5 kilometres (3.1 mi) south of Devanahalli. The terminal was designed to serve up to 12 million passengers per year, but has been expanded to cater to 15 million passengers. It can be reached from Devanahalli by heading south on NH 44 and taking the left exit on the trumpet interchange.

AirAsia India has its head office in the Alpha 3 building on the airport grounds.

==== Terminal 2 ====
The terminal 2 of KIA was designed by Skidmore, Owings & Merrill (SOM), a firm based in Chicago, United States and constructed by Larsen & Toubro. The terminal is spread over 255,000 square meters and is designed as a "terminal in a garden".

==== Terminal 3 ====
The terminal 3 of KIA is a proposed plan looking to cater to over 100 million passengers, which is a USD 2 billion expansion.

== Food, leisure and hospitality ==
Devanahalli has few five star hotels namely - JW Marriott Hotel by Marriott International, Taj Hotel Bangalore, DoubleTree by Hilton and upcoming Hyatt House Hotel.

== Notable people ==
The notable residents of Devanahalli include -

=== Historical ===
- Tipu Sultan
- Hyder Ali
- Kempe Gowda I

== Gallery ==
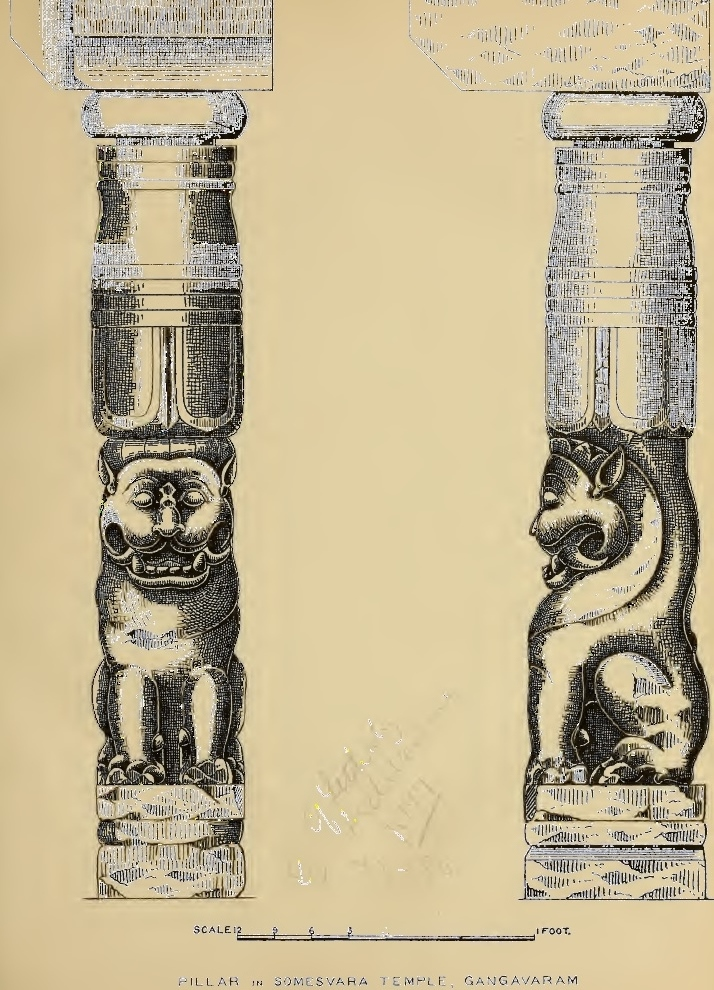
Details of Pillars of the Someshwara Temple, Gangavaram, Chowdappanahalli, Devanahalli, Bangalore Rural District

=== Gallery ===
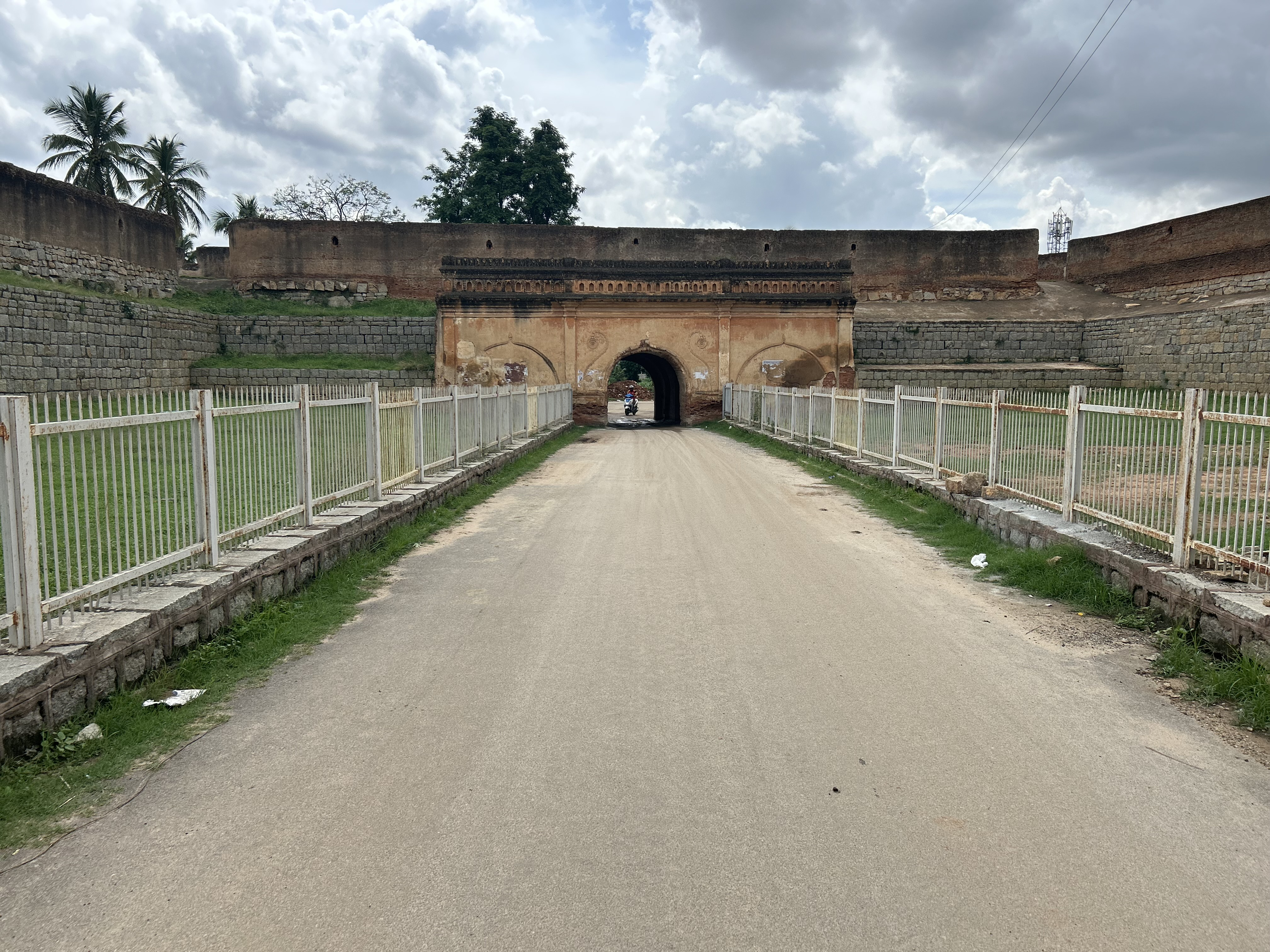

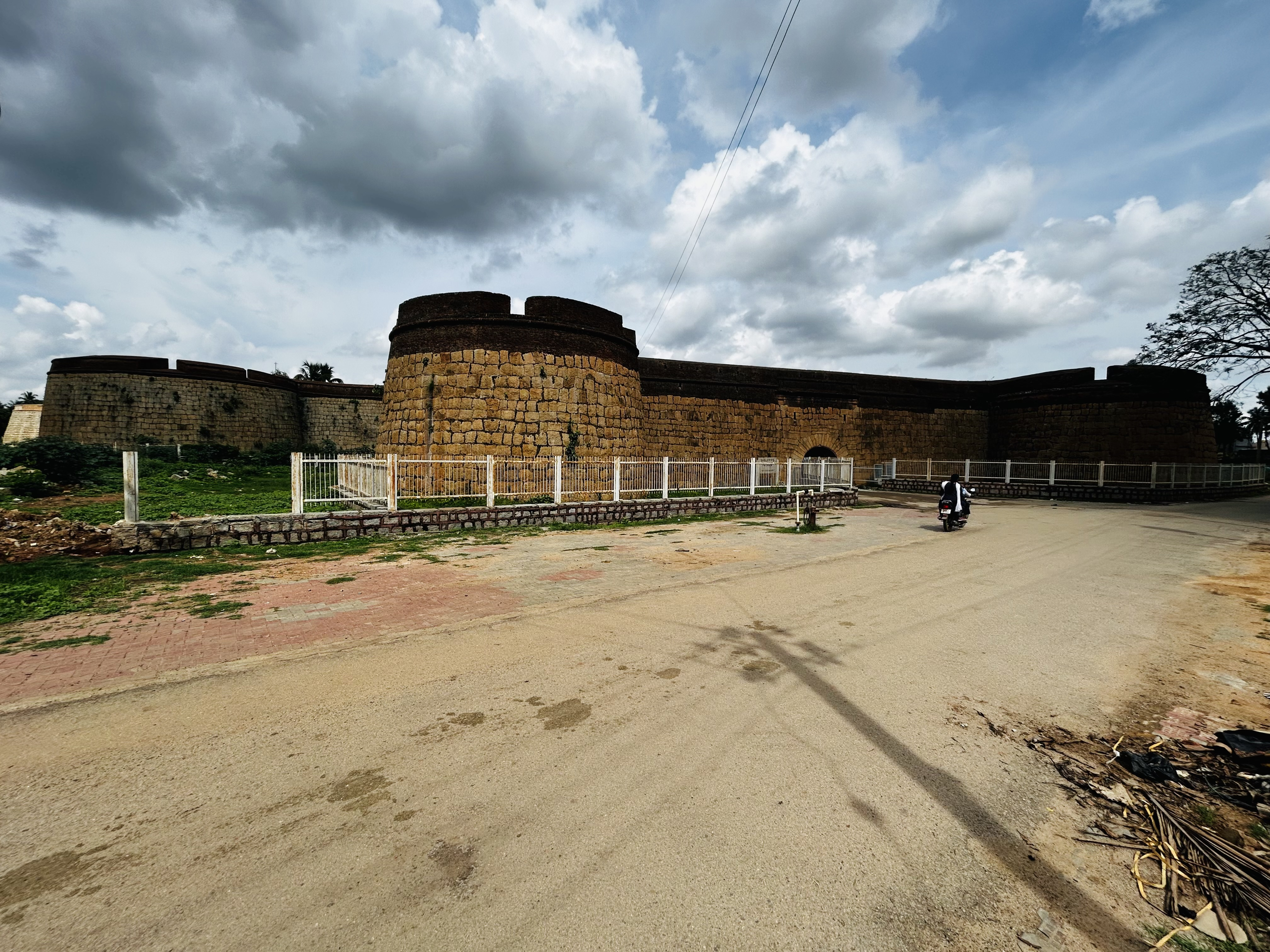

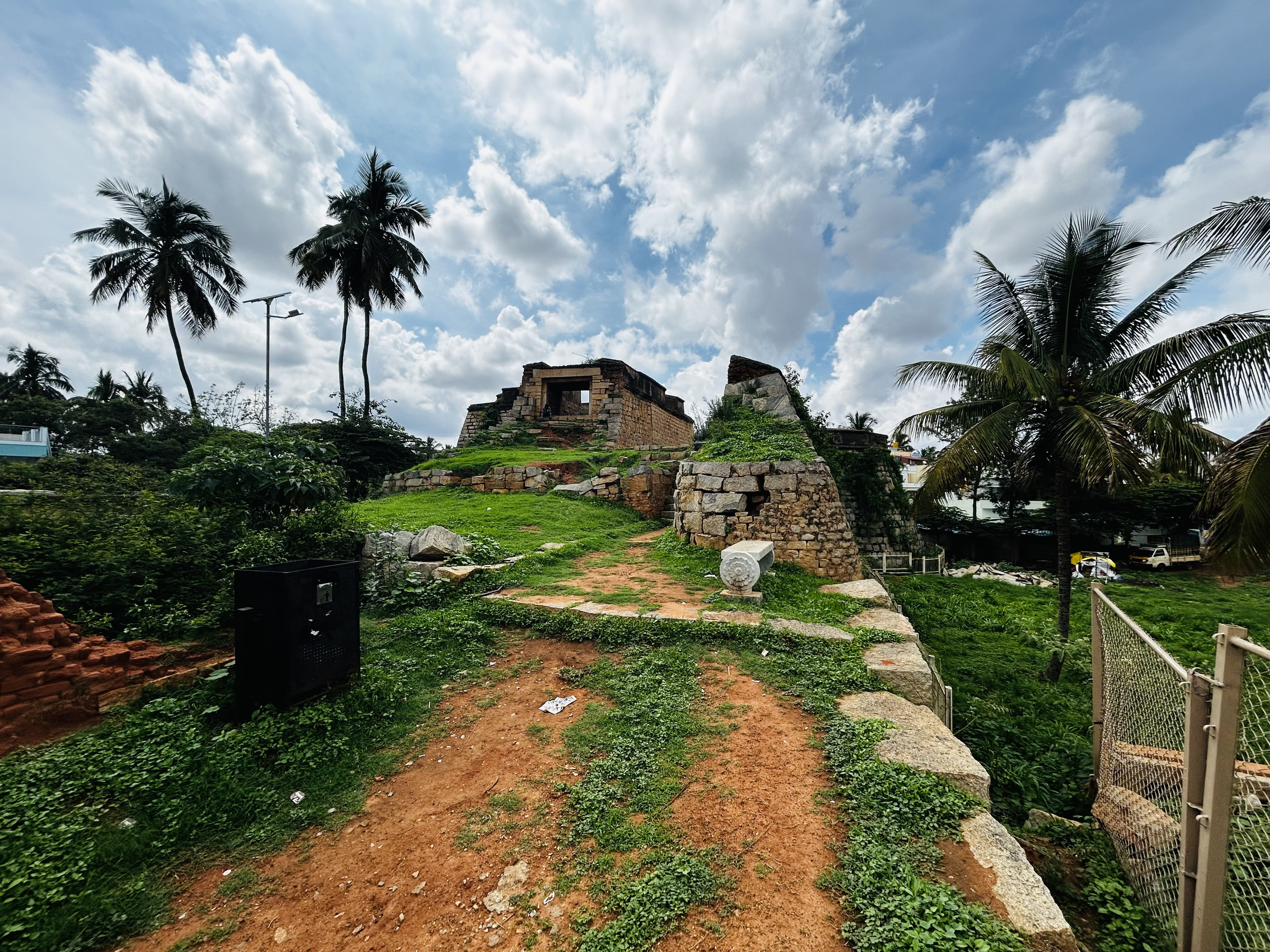

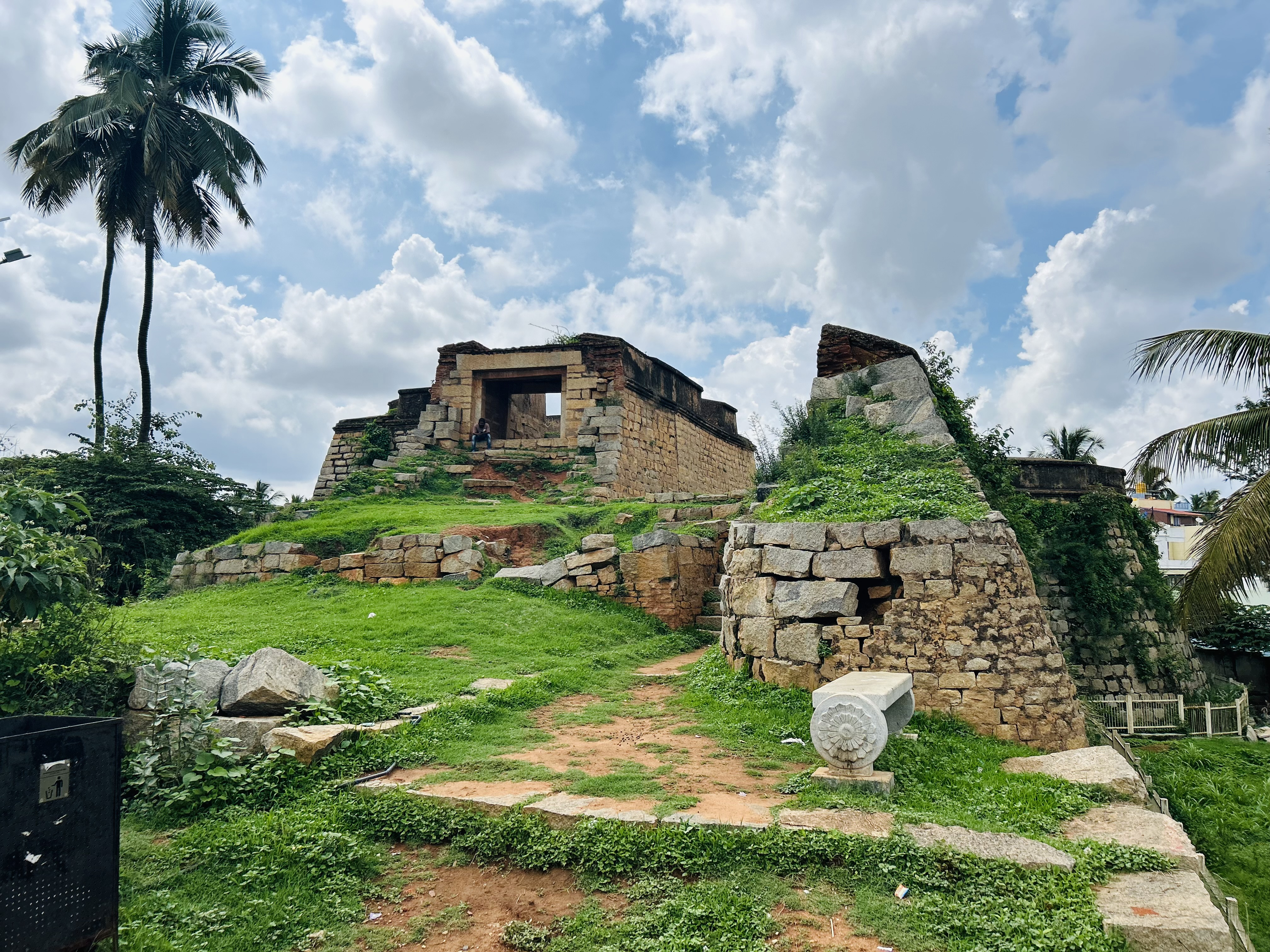

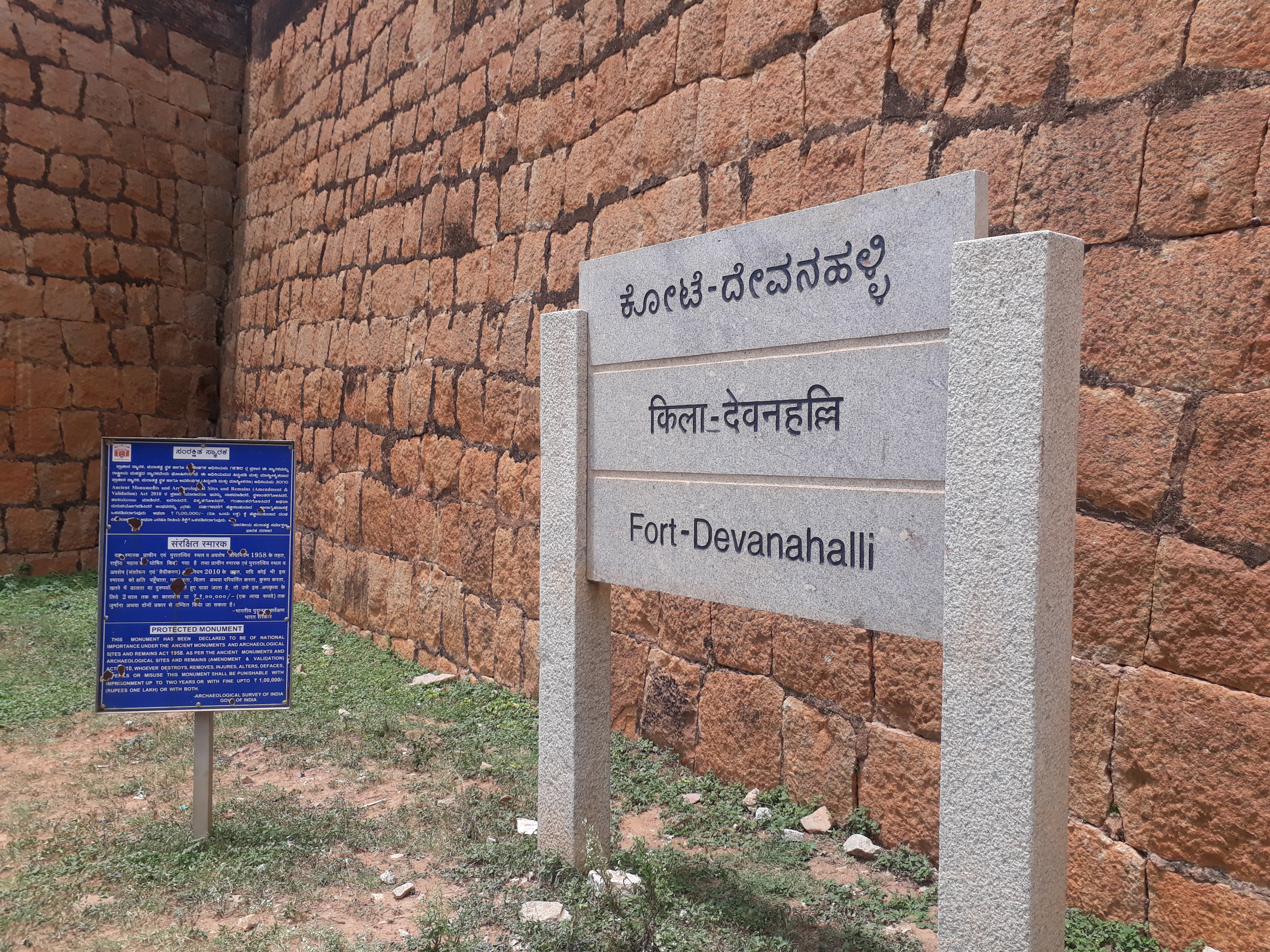

== Further reading on Devanahalli ==
- Tipu Sultan - The Saga of Mysore's Interregnum (1760–1799) (Publisher: Penguin Random House India Private Limited; ISBN 978-93-6790-094-9)
- Agrarian Change and Urbanization in Southern India (Publisher: Springer Nature Singapore; ISBN 978-981-10-8336-5)
- Seen & Unseen Bangalore (Publisher: Notion Press; ISBN 978-93-86073-18-1)
- The Wanderings That Made Headlines (Publisher: Notion Press; ISBN 978-1-64587-678-6)
- The Vanished Raj A Memoir of Princely India (Publisher: Prism Books Private Limited; ISBN 978-93-88478-11-3)
- Social Innovations in Urban Sanitation in India (Publisher: Taylor & Francis; ISBN 978-1-000-88637-5)
- Sultan: The Legend of Hyder Ali (Publisher: Pan Macmillan; ISBN 978-93-89109-80-1)
