= Parijaata line =

Planned suburban rail line in Bengaluru, India

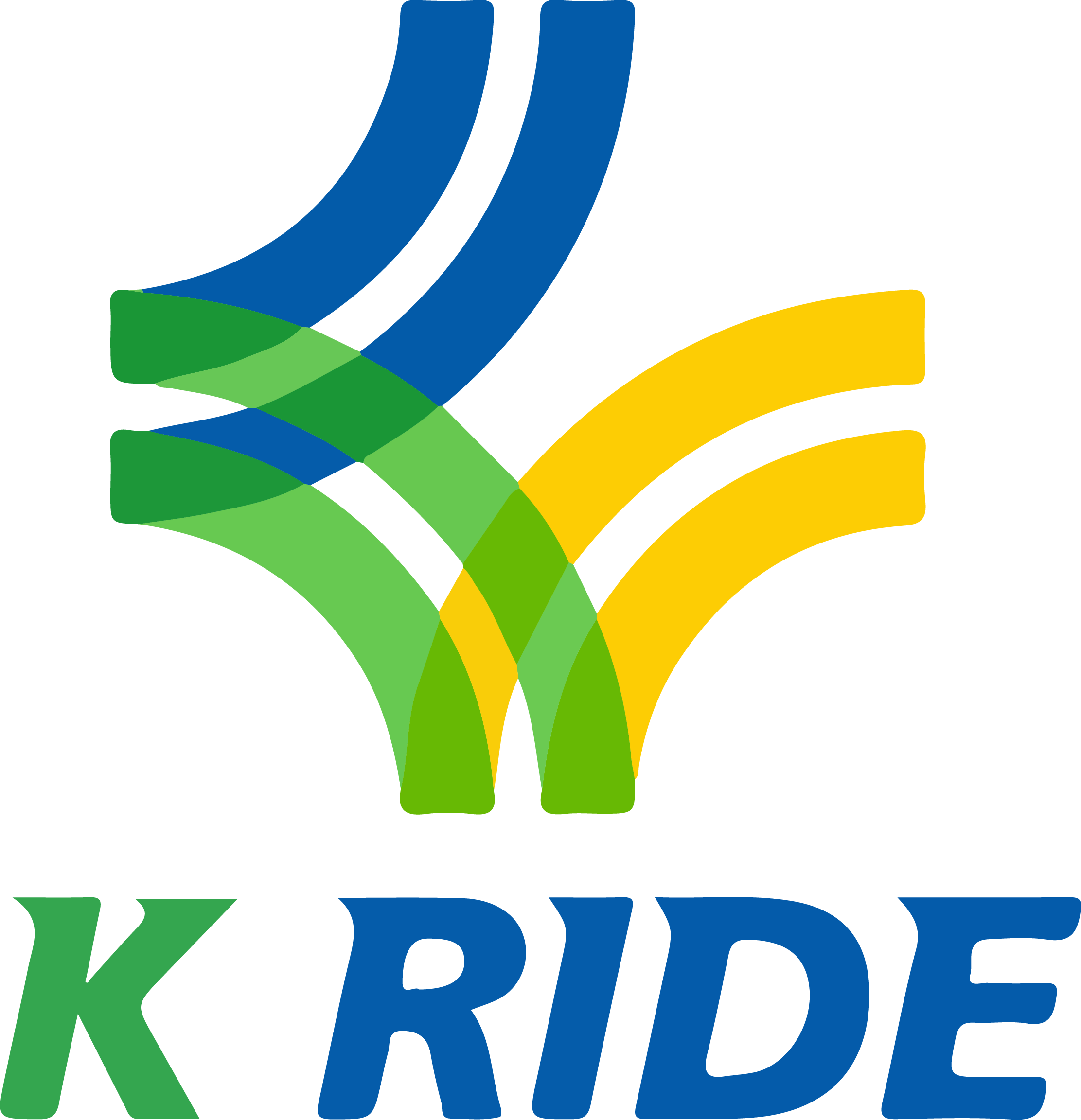

Overview
- Native name: Pārijāta mārga
- Owner: Rail Infrastructure Development Company (Karnataka) Limited K-RIDE
- Termini: Kengeri; Whitefield
- Stations: 14

Service
- Type: Commuter rail
- Operator: Rail Infrastructure Development Company (Karnataka) Limited K-RIDE
- Depot: TBD

History
- Planned opening: June 2029; 2 years' time

Technical
- Line length: 35.52 km (22.07 mi)
- Number of tracks: Double-track
- Character: Elevated and at-grade
- Track gauge: 5 ft 6 in (1,676 mm) broad gauge
- Electrification: 25 kV 50 Hz AC overhead catenary
Route map
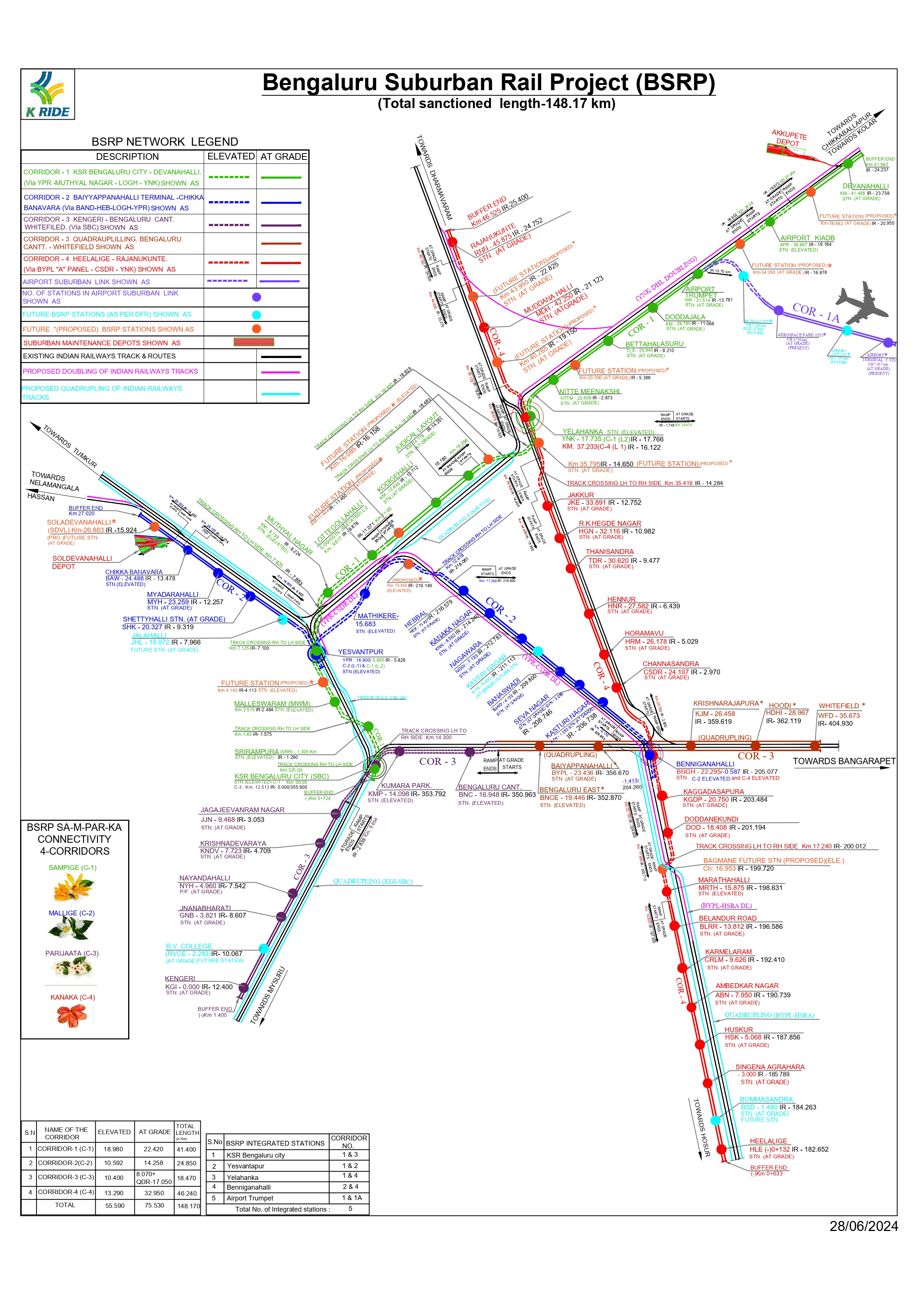

The Parijaata line is a planned Bengaluru Suburban rail line between Kengeri and Whitefield, in India. The 35 km (22 mi) long broad-gauge line was approved in 2019. The line which is also referred as 'corridor-3' is awaiting for construction works. It is named after the flower Parijaata (Nyctanthes arbor-tristis) in Kannada.

== History ==
The route between Kengeri and Whitefield, proposed by RITES in 2018 was approved on 7 October 2020 by government of India along with three other corridors of Bengaluru suburban rail project. The line was then named after the regional flower's Kannada name Parijaata. In 2024, amidst the surfacing of talks regarding shelving of the project, minister for railways in Karnataka, V Somanna responded that the Mallige (line 2) along with Kanaka (line 4) were prioritised over Sampige (line 1) and Parijaata. Since almost entirety of the Parijaata route ran along existing Purple line of Namma Metro.

In December 2024, Rajkumar Dugar, founder and convenor of Citizens for Citizens (C4C), proposed splitting of the construction of line in two segments C3A and C3B, with C3A running from Kengeri to Bangalore Cantonment railway station and C3B from Cantonment to Whitefield, while prioritising C3A as it was said to become the fourth railway terminal of the city.

The line is planned to be opened by June 2029 along with Sampige.

== Stations ==
Parijaata Line
#	Station Name		Opening	Connections / Transits / Terminals	Station Layout	Platform Level Type
#	English	Kannada	Opening	Connections / Transits / Terminals	Station Layout	Platform Level Type
1	Kengeri	ಕೆಂಗೇರಿ	June 2029	Kengeri TTMC	TBD	Side
2	RV College	ಆರ್.ವಿ. ಕಾಲೇಜು	June 2029		TBD	Side
3	Jnanabharathi	ಜ್ಞಾನಭಾರತಿ	June 2029	Purple Line	TBD	Side
4	Nayandahalli	ನಾಯಂಡಹಳ್ಳಿ	June 2029		TBD	Side
5	Krishnadevaraya	ಕೃಷ್ಣದೇವರಾಯ	June 2029		TBD	Side
6	Jagajevanarama Nagara	ಜಗಜೀವನರಾಮ ನಗರ	June 2029		TBD	Side
7	KSR Bengaluru	ಕ್ರಾ.ಸಂ. ಬೆಂಗಳೂರು	June 2029	Purple Line; Sampige (Planned)	TBD	Side
8	Kumara Park	ಕುಮಾರ ಪಾರ್ಕ್	June 2029		TBD	Side
9	Cantonment Railway Station	ದಂಡು ರೈಲ್ವೇ ನಿಲ್ದಾಣ	June 2029	Pink Line	TBD	Side
10	Bengaluru East	ಪೂರ್ವ ಬೆಂಗಳೂರು	June 2029		TBD	Side
11	Baiyyappanahalli	ಬೈಯ್ಯಪ್ಪನಹಳ್ಳಿ	June 2029	Purple Line	TBD	Side
	New station	ಹೊಸ ನಿಲ್ದಾಣ	June 2029		TBD	Side
12	Krishnarajapura	ಕೃಷ್ಣರಾಜಪುರ	June 2029	Purple Line; Blue Line (Under-construction)	TBD	Side
13	Hoodi	ಹೂಡಿ	June 2029		TBD	Side
14	Whitefield	ವೈಟ್ಫೀಲ್ಡ್	June 2029	Purple Line	TBD	Side

== See also ==
- Urban rail transit in India
  - Namma Metro
  - Sampige line
  - Mallige line
  - Kanaka line
