= Horamavu =

- Suburb
- Location within Bengaluru
- Country: India
- State: Karnataka
- City: Bengaluru
- Time zone: UTC+5:30 (IST)
- PIN: 560113

Horamavu is a residential locality in the eastern part of Bengaluru, in the Indian state of Karnataka. It falls under the jurisdiction of the Bruhat Bengaluru Mahanagara Palike (BBMP) and has witnessed rapid urbanisation in recent years.

== Geography ==
Horamavu is situated in the eastern part of Bengaluru, in the Indian state of Karnataka. It is surrounded by localities such as Ramamurthy Nagar, Banaswadi, Kalkere and Kalyan Nagar. The area is primarily residential, with a mix of apartment complexes and independent houses.

The locality includes two prominent water bodies: Horamavu Agara Lake and Horamavu Lake, which serve as ecological and recreational spaces for residents. Walking and jogging tracks have been developed around these lakes. Despite undergoing rejuvenation in 2023, Horamavu Agara Lake has reportedly faced renewed pollution concerns.

== Connectivity ==
Horamavu is served by road-based public transport and is expected to gain enhanced connectivity through upcoming metro and suburban rail projects in Bengaluru.

=== Bus ===
Horamavu is well connected by road through services operated by the Bengaluru Metropolitan Transport Corporation (BMTC), which provides connectivity to various parts of the city including Kempegowda Bus Station (Majestic), Shivajinagar, KR Market, and HSR Layout.

Several bus routes originate from or pass through Horamavu and nearby stops such as Horamavu Signal, Horamavu Agara, and Banjara Layout. Common routes serving the area include the 301 series and 302G, connecting Horamavu to key destinations across Bengaluru.

=== Metro ===
The area will be served by the under-construction Namma Metro Blue Line through the proposed Horamavu Metro Station. This elevated station is part of Phase 2B of the Blue Line, which connects KR Puram to KIAL Terminals metro station. The line is scheduled for completion by December 2027.

The Blue Line (Airport Metro Line) is designed to improve connectivity between eastern Bengaluru and key hubs such as Hebbal and Kempegowda International Airport.

=== Suburban rail ===
Horamavu will also be served by the proposed Kanaka line, part of the Bengaluru Suburban Rail Project implemented by K-RIDE.

A planned Horamavu Railway Station is included on this corridor, which will run between Heelalige and Rajanakunte. The suburban rail network is expected to be completed by 2030 following revised project timelines.

The suburban rail network aims to provide faster intra-city rail connectivity and integrate with existing metro and railway systems.

=== Rail ===
The nearest major railway stations to Horamavu include Krishnarajapuram railway station and Sir M. Visvesvaraya Terminal railway station (SMVT), which provide connectivity to regional and long-distance destinations across India.

== Infrastructure ==
Horamavu has experienced significant residential growth due to its proximity to employment hubs such as the Outer Ring Road and Manyata Tech Park. The area has seen the development of apartment complexes and retail establishments.

Water supply in Horamavu is managed by the Bangalore Water Supply and Sewerage Board (BWSSB), which supplies treated water from the Cauvery River under the Cauvery Water Supply Scheme. In recent years, parts of Horamavu, including Horamavu Agara, have been connected to piped Cauvery water supply. However, residents have reported issues such as pipeline leakages and inconsistent supply.

== Education ==
Educational institutions in and around Horamavu include schools affiliated with national and state boards. Notable institutions in nearby areas include VIBGYOR High and ORCHIDS The International School.

Due to its proximity to established neighbourhoods such as Banaswadi and Kalyan Nagar, residents also have access to a range of other schools and colleges in the vicinity.

== Healthcare ==
Healthcare services for residents of Horamavu are primarily provided by hospitals and clinics located in nearby areas such as Banaswadi, Kalyan Nagar and HRBR Layout. These include multi-specialty hospitals, maternity centres and diagnostic facilities.

Major healthcare providers in the broader vicinity include facilities operated by organisations such as Aster DM Healthcare and Manipal Hospitals, which have centres in East Bengaluru.
