= Horamavu railway station =

Proposed suburban railway station in Bengaluru, India

Horamavu Railway Station

General information
- Location: Horamavu, Bengaluru, Karnataka - 560113; India
- Coordinates: 13.025036°N 77.659347°E
- System: Bengaluru Suburban Railway station
- Owner: Indian Railways
- Operator: K-RIDE
- Line: Bengaluru Suburban Railway
- Platforms: 2
- Tracks: 2

Construction
- Structure type: At-grade

Other information
- Status: Under construction
Location

Horamavu railway station is a proposed suburban railway station under construction in Horamavu, Bengaluru, Karnataka, India. The station will form part of the Bengaluru Suburban Railway network being developed by K-RIDE. It is planned as an at-grade station on the Kanaka line (Corridor 4), connecting Heelalige and Rajanukunte.

== History ==
The station was proposed as part of the Bengaluru Suburban Railway Project (BSRP), a commuter rail system approved jointly by the Government of India and Government of Karnataka to improve rail-based connectivity within the Bengaluru metropolitan region.

Horamavu station is one of the planned stations on Corridor 4 (Kanaka Line), a 46.88-kilometre corridor connecting Heelalige and Rajanukunte through eastern and northern Bengaluru.

In February 2025, NCC Limited was awarded Package C4B to construct nine stations on the Kanaka corridor, including Horamavu station.

In May 2026, Work on the Kanaka corridor had resumed in phases after delays related to land acquisition and contract issues. Horamavu was listed among the planned stations on the corridor.

== Station layout ==
Horamavu is planned as an at-grade suburban railway station with two platforms and supporting commuter facilities. The station is proposed near Horamavu Main Road and is expected to serve the residential areas of Horamavu, Kalkere and Ramamurthy Nagar.

== Connectivity ==
The station is expected to provide connectivity to eastern Bengaluru through feeder bus services and nearby arterial roads. The proposed Horamavu metro station on the Blue Line of Namma Metro is located nearby and is expected to improve multimodal integration in the area.

== See also ==
- Bengaluru Suburban Railway
- Horamavu metro station
- Namma Metro
