= Sampige line =

Planned suburban rail line in Bengaluru, India

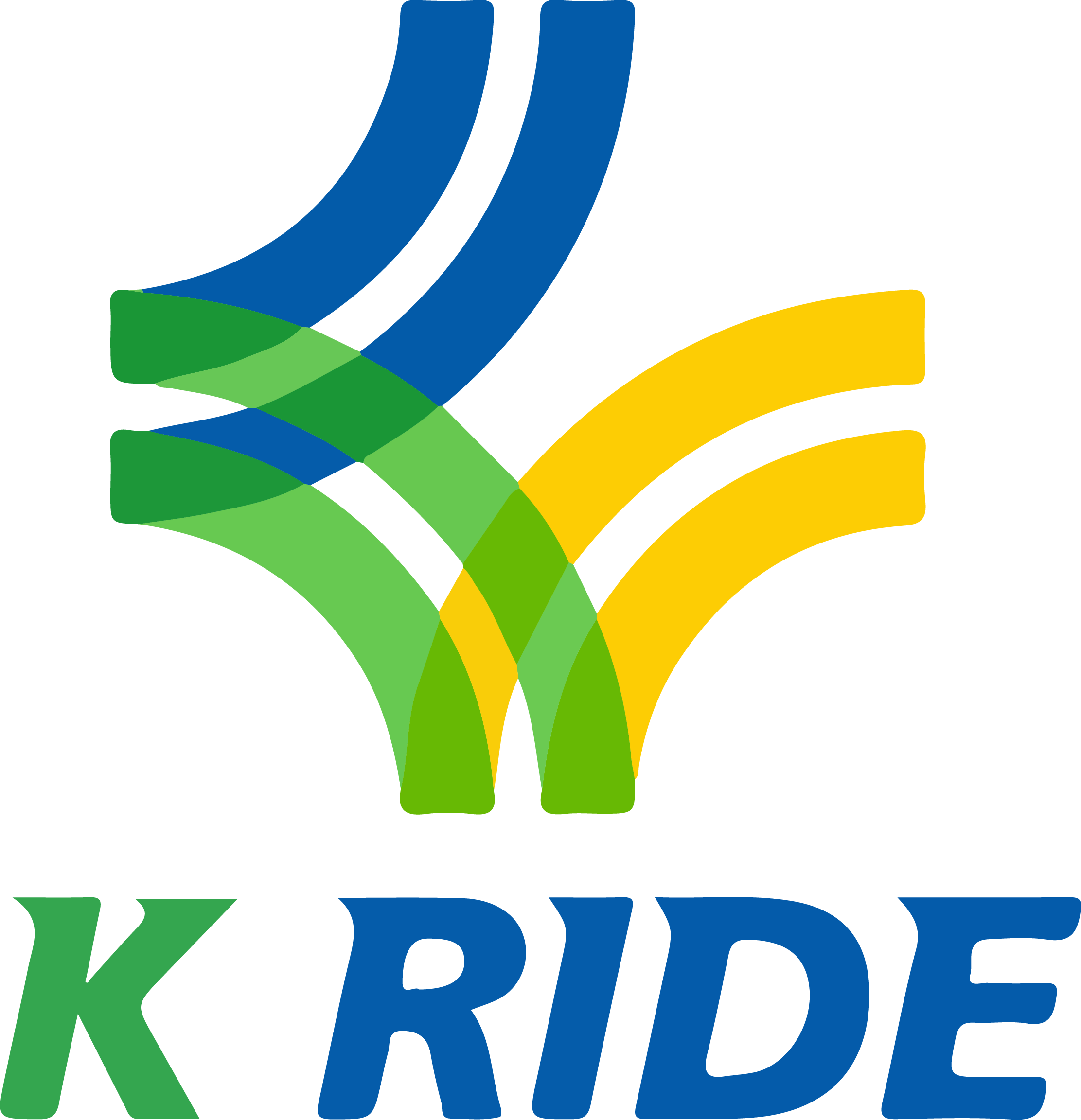

Overview
- Native name: Saṁpige mārga
- Status: Approved
- Owner: Rail Infrastructure Development Company (Karnataka) Limited K-RIDE
- Termini: KSR Railway Station; Devanahalli / Kempegowda International (1A)
- Stations: 19

Service
- Type: Commuter rail
- Services: 2
- Operator: Rail Infrastructure Development Company (Karnataka) Limited K-RIDE
- Depot(s): Akkupete, Devanahalli

History
- Planned opening: June 2029; 2 years' time

Technical
- Line length: 45.52 km (28.28 mi)
- Number of tracks: Double-track
- Character: Elevated and at-grade
- Track gauge: 5 ft 6 in (1,676 mm) broad gauge
- Electrification: 25 kV 50 Hz AC overhead catenary

The Sampige line is a planned Bengaluru Suburban rail line running from KSR Bengaluru to Devanahalli and the Kempegowda International Airport. The 45 km (28 mi) long broad-gauge line was approved in 2019 and in 2024 was in the tendering process. The line which is also referred as 'corridor-1' is planned to be constructed in two phases C1A and C1B respectively.

The C1A section runs from KSR Bengaluru to Yelahanka Junction railway station. While the C1B section starts from Yelahanka Junction and ends in Devanhalli town in the north. C1B also includes a 5.5 km (3.4 mi) branch line towards the Airport. The line is named after the regional flower Sampige (Magnolia champaca) in Kannada.

== History ==
While the earliest proposals lacked a suburban railway line linking Bengaluru to Devanahalli, it was only after the inauguration of a new international airport near the northern town of Devanahalli that a line was considered within the proposal. The 'Call To Action' report in 2010, had the proposal of the line Yeshawanthapura Junction to Chikkaballapura via Yelahanka Junction and Devanahalli. In the next proposal by RITES in 2012, consisted a line from Yelahanka Junction to Doddaballapura while passing 6 km (3.7 mi) from the Airport. A branch line connecting the same was first mooted under this proposal Later in 2019. RITES submitted a revised project report that included the latest plans for the Devanhalli and Airport line.

On 7 October 2020, government of India approved the four corridors of Bengaluru suburban rail project including the KSR Bengaluru – Devanahalli line and its Airport branch. The line was then named after the regional flower's Kannada name Sampige. While the construction works commenced on Mallige (line 2) and Kanaka (line 4), Sampige line had been pushed below the priority list according to the Karnataka's minister of Railway, V Somanna. As per the minister, Sampige and Parijaata lines presented their own challenges involving technical and administrative work in which, the government's special purpose body K-RIDE lacked. In 2024, a revised alignment plan was submitted to South Western Railway and the approval was awaited. The line was divided into two packages: Package 1A (KSR Bengaluru to Yelahanka, 17.63 km (10.95 mi)) and Package 1B (Yelahanka to Devanahalli, 23 km (14 mi).

=== Construction ===
History
Section	Opening	Terminals		Length	Stations
C1A	June 2029	KSR Bengaluru	Yelahanka	17.3 km (10.7 mi)	10
C1B	June 2029	Yelahanka	Devanahalli	23 km (14 mi)	7
C1B Branch	June 2029	Airport Trumpet	Kempegowda International	5.5 km (3.4 mi)	2

== Stations ==
Sampige Line
#	Station Name		Opening	Connections / Transits / Terminals	Station Layout	Platform Level Type
#	English	Kannada	Opening	Connections / Transits / Terminals	Station Layout	Platform Level Type
1	KSR Bengaluru	ಕ್ರಾ.ಸಂ.ರಾ. ಬೆಂಗಳೂರು	June 2029	Purple Line; Parijaata (Approved)	TBD	Side
2	Srirampura	ಶ್ರೀರಾಂಪುರ	June 2029	Green Line	TBD	Side
3	Malleshwaram	ಮಲ್ಲೇಶ್ವರಂ	June 2029		TBD	Side
4	Yeshavanthapura	ಯಶವಂತಪುರ	June 2029		TBD	Side
5	Muthyalanagara	ಮುತ್ಯಾಲನಗರ	June 2029	Green Line; Mallige (Under-construction)	TBD	Side
6	Lottegollahalli	ಲೊಟ್ಟೆಗೊಲ್ಲಹಳ್ಳಿ	June 2029		TBD	Side
7	Kodigehalli	ಕೊಡಿಗೇಹಳ್ಳಿ	June 2029		TBD	Side
8	Judicial layout	ನ್ಯಾಯಾಂಗ ವಿನ್ಯಾಸ	June 2029		TBD	Side
9	New station	ಹೊಸ ನಿಲ್ದಾಣ	June 2029		TBD	Side
10	Yelahanka	ಯಲಹಂಕ	June 2029	Kanaka (Under-construction)	TBD	Side
11	NITTE Meenakshi	ನಿಟ್ಟೆ ಮೀನಾಕ್ಷಿ	June 2029		TBD	Side
12	Bettahalasuru	ಬೆಟ್ಟಹಲಸೂರು	June 2029		TBD	Side
13	Doddajaala	ದೊಡ್ಡಜಾಲ	June 2029		TBD	Side
14	Airport Trumpet	ವಿಮಾನ ನಿಲ್ದಾಣ ಕಹಳೆ	June 2029		TBD	Side
15	Airport halt	ವಿಮಾನ ಹಾಲ್ಟ್	June 2029		TBD	Side
16	New station	ಹೊಸ ನಿಲ್ದಾಣ	June 2029		TBD	Side
17	Devanahalli	ದೇವನಹಳ್ಳಿ	June 2029		TBD	Side
Sampige Line 1A
18	Airport City	ವಿಮಾನ ನಿಲ್ದಾಣ ನಗರ	2028	Blue Line	TBD	Side
19	Kempegowda International Airport	ಕೆಂಪೇಗೌಡ ಅಂತರಾಷ್ಟ್ರೀಯ ವಿಮಾನ ನಿಲ್ದಾಣ	2028	Blue Line	TBD	Side

== See also ==
- Urban rail transit in India
  - Namma Metro
  - Mallige line
  - Parijaata line
  - Kanaka line
