= Thanisandra railway station =

Railway station in Karnataka, India

Thanisandra Thaṇisandra Thaanisandra

General information
- Location: Thanisandra, Bangalore, Karnataka; India
- Coordinates: 13.060793°N 77.631327°E
- Elevation: 906 metres (2,972 ft)
- System: Indian Railways station
- Owner: Indian Railways
- Operator: Indian Railways
- Line: Double electric line
- Platforms: 1

Construction
- Structure type: At Grade
- Platform levels: 1
- Parking: No

Other information
- Station code: THSA
- Fare zone: South Western
Location
- Location within Bengaluru Location within Karnataka Location within India

Thanisandra railway station (station code: THSA) is a railway station in Bangalore, India, which used to serve Thanisandra locality. Despite being an existing railway station, it has historically witnessed limited passenger train services and low operational activity.

== History ==
Thanisandra railway station was established as a halt station to serve suburban areas in northern Bengaluru. Over time, train stoppages at the station were reduced, leading to demands from residents and commuter groups for restoration and modernization of services. The station gained renewed attention with the development of the Bengaluru Suburban Railway project, particularly Corridor-4 (Kanaka line), which is expected to improve rail connectivity in north Bengaluru.

== Connectivity ==
The station is located near Thanisandra Main Road and serves nearby residential layouts, apartment complexes and employment hubs in north Bengaluru, including areas around Manyata Tech Park.

== See also ==
- Bengaluru Commuter Rail

| Preceding station | Indian Railways | Following station |
|---|---|---|
| Yelahanka Junction towards ? | Bangalore–Kolar line | Channasandra towards ? |
