= Kanaka line =

Planned suburban rail line in Bengaluru, India

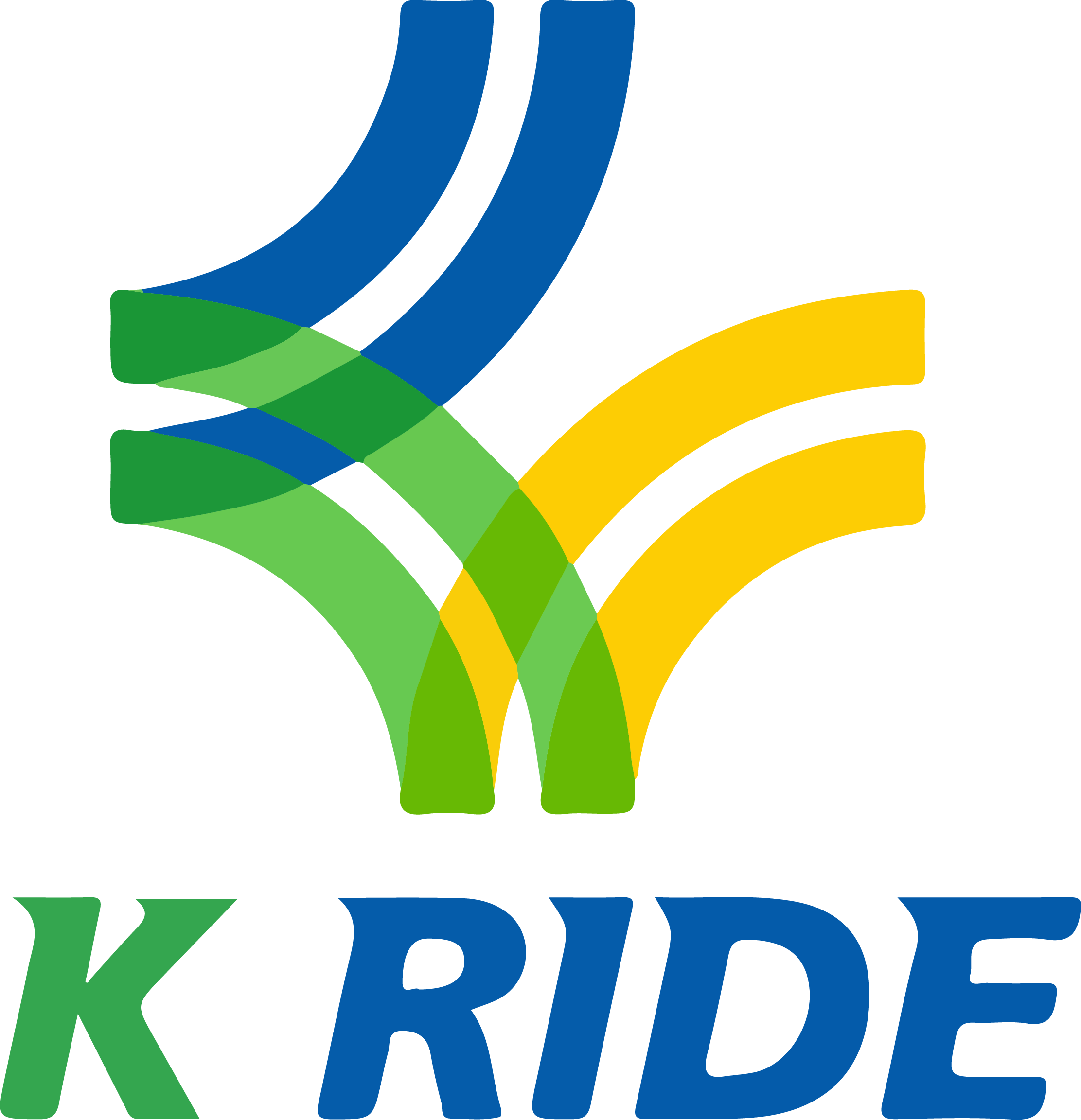

Overview
- Native name: Kanaka mārga
- Status: Under-construction
- Owner: Rail Infrastructure Development Company (Karnataka) Limited K-RIDE
- Termini: Heelalige; Rajanakunte
- Stations: 17

Service
- Type: Commuter rail
- Operator: Rail Infrastructure Development Company (Karnataka) Limited K-RIDE
- Depot: TBD

History
- Planned opening: June 2029; 2 years' time

Technical
- Line length: 47.74 km (29.66 mi)
- Number of tracks: Double-track
- Character: Elevated and at-grade
- Track gauge: 5 ft 6 in (1,676 mm) broad gauge
- Electrification: 25 kV 50 Hz AC overhead catenary

The Kanaka line is an under-construction Bengaluru Suburban rail line between Heelalige and Rajanakunte. The 35 km (22 mi) long broad-gauge line was approved in 2019. The construction works for the line which is also referred as 'corridor-4' began in 2024. The line is named after the flower Kanaka (Crossandra infundibuliformis) in Kannada.

== History ==
The Heelalige to Rajanakunte line via Yelahanka was the longest among the four proposed corridors by RITES in 2019. It was then approved in the following year along with other corridors. The line was then named after the regional flower's Kannada name Kanaka.

In 2024, minister for railways in Karnataka, V Somanna stated that the Mallige (line 2) along with Kanaka (line 4) were prioritised over the other two. In 2024, the pre-construction works for the line had commenced along with acquisition process of private land for the corridor, and work had already commenced on minor bridges and earth-retaining structures.

For phase wise construction works, the line was divided in two packages C4A and C4B. The corridor 4A ran from Heelalige to Kaggadasapura while 4B from Channasandara to Rajanakunte. The line is planned to be opened by March 2027 along with Mallige.

=== Construction ===
Between Benniganahalli and Kasturi Nagar, a 500-metre section of the Mallige Line was redesigned to share infrastructure with Blue Line (Namma Metro). Under this arrangement, the Kanaka line viaduct will run directly below the Namma Metro's Blue Line viaduct for approximately 500 metres adjacent to the Benniganahalli flyover.

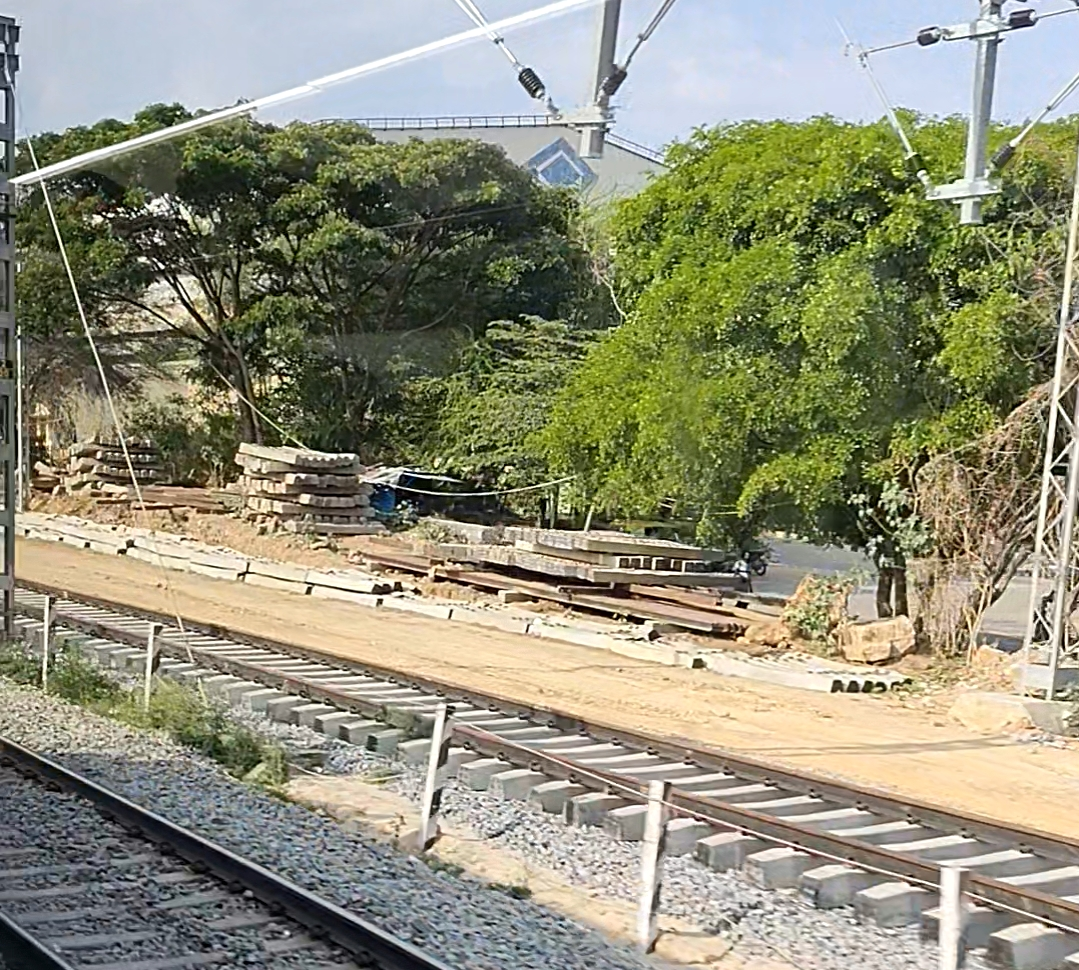
Construction activities of Kanaka line near Dooravani Nagara in East Bengaluru.

History
Section	Opening	Terminals		Length	Stations
C4A	March 2027	Heelalige	Kaggadasapura	20 km (12 mi)	9
C4B	March 2027	Kaggadasapura	Rajanakunte	27 km (17 mi)	8

== Stations ==
Kanaka Line
#	Station Name		Opening	Connections / Transits / Terminals	Station Layout	Platform Level Type
#	English	Kannada	Opening	Connections / Transits / Terminals	Station Layout	Platform Level Type
1	Heelalige	ಹೀಲಲಿಗೆ	March 2027		TBD	Side
2	Bommasandra (Future Station)	ಬೊಮ್ಮಸಂದ್ರ	March 2027		TBD	Side
3	Singena Agrahaara	ಸಿಂಗೇನ ಅಗ್ರಹಾರ	March 2027		TBD	Side
4	Huskuru	ಹುಸ್ಕೂರು	March 2027		TBD	Side
5	Ambedkar Nagara	ಅಂಬೇಡ್ಕರ್ ನಗರ	March 2027		TBD	Side
6	Carmelaram	ಕರ್ಮೇಲರಂ	March 2027	Red Line	TBD	Side
7	Bellanduru Road	ಬೆಳ್ಳಂದೂರು ರಸ್ತೆ	March 2027		TBD	Side
8	Marathahalli	ಮಾರತಹಳ್ಳಿ	March 2027		TBD	Side
9	Bagmane (Future Station)	ಬಾಗ್ಮನೆ	March 2027		TBD	Side
10	Doddanekundi	ದೊಡ್ಡನೆಕುಂದಿ	March 2027	Blue Line	TBD	Side
11	Kaggadasapura	ಕಗ್ಗದಾಸಪುರ	March 2027		TBD	Side
12	Benniganahalli	ಬೆನ್ನಿಗಾನಹಳ್ಳಿ	March 2027	Purple Line; Mallige (Under-construction)	TBD	Side
13	Channasandara	ಚನ್ನಸಂದರ	March 2027	Blue Line	TBD	Side
14	Horamavu	ಹೊರಮಾವು	March 2027		TBD	Side
15	Hennuru	ಹೆಣ್ಣೂರು	March 2027		TBD	Side
16	Thanisandara	ಥಣಿಸಂದ್ರ	March 2027		TBD	Side
17	R.K.Hegde Nagara	ಹೆಗಡೆ ನಗರ	March 2027		TBD	Side
18	Jakkuru	ಜಕ್ಕೂರು	March 2027		TBD	Side
	New station	ಹೊಸ ನಿಲ್ದಾಣ	March 2027		TBD	Side
19	Yelahanka	ಯಲಹಂಕ	March 2027	Sampige (Planned)	TBD	Side
	New station	ಹೊಸ ನಿಲ್ದಾಣ	March 2027		TBD	Side
18	Muddanahalli	ಮುದ್ದನಹಳ್ಳಿ	March 2027		TBD	Side
	New station	ಹೊಸ ನಿಲ್ದಾಣ				
19	Rajanakunte	ರಾಜನಕುಂಟೆ				

== See also ==
- Urban rail transit in India
  - Bengaluru Suburban Railway
  - Namma Metro
  - Sampige line
  - Mallige line
  - Parijaata line
