= NYH =

NYH may refer to:

- New York Herald, a newspaper, 1835-1924
- Station code for Nayandahalli Railway Station
