= Mallige line =

Under-construction suburban rail line in Bengaluru, India

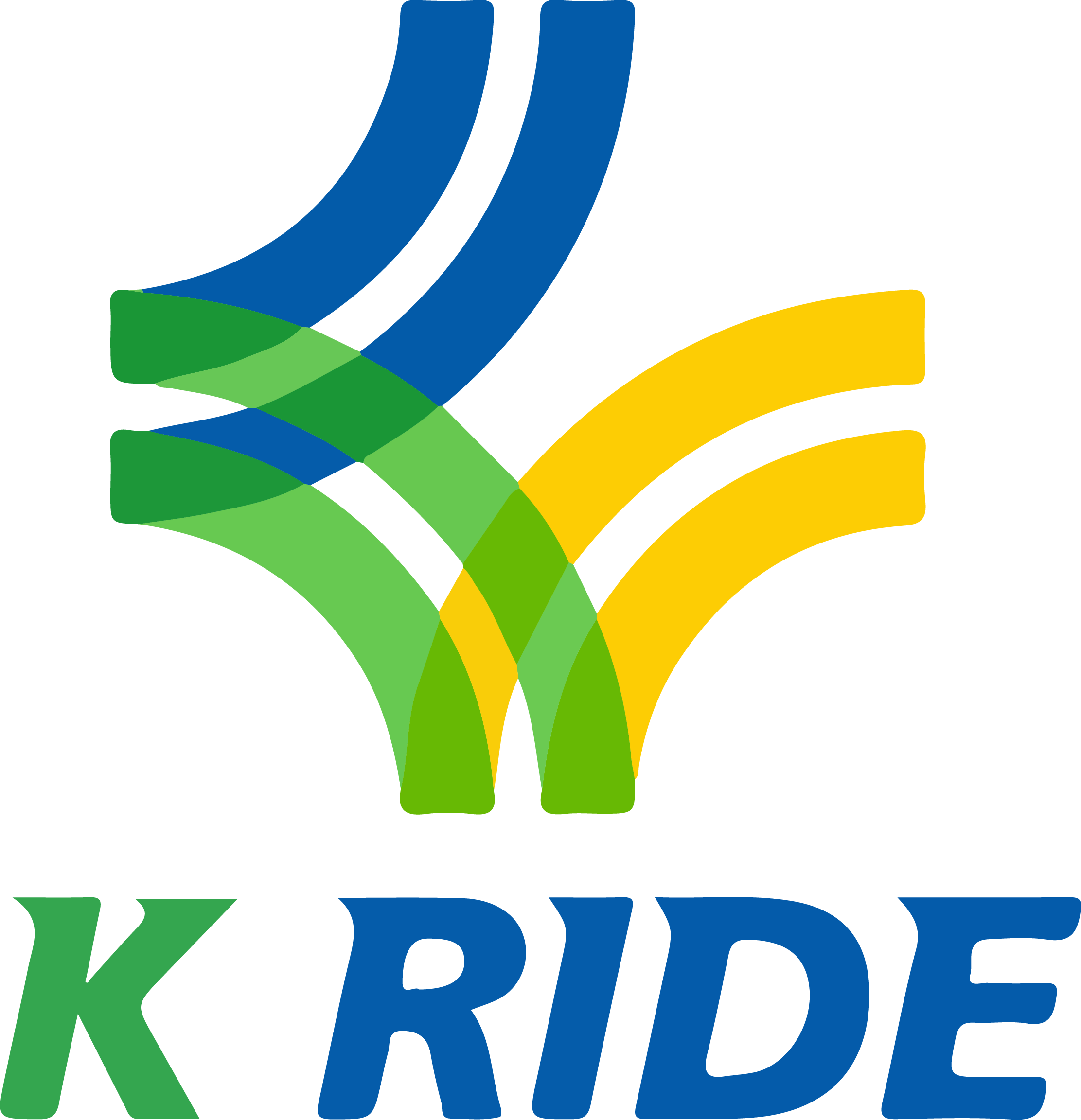

Overview
- Native name: ಮಲ್ಲಿಗೆ ಮಾರ್ಗ
- Owner: Rail Infrastructure Development Company (Karnataka) Limited K-RIDE
- Termini: Benniganahalli; Chikkabanavara
- Stations: 16

Service
- Type: Commuter rail
- Operator: Rail Infrastructure Development Company (Karnataka) Limited K-RIDE
- Depot: Soladevanahalli

History
- Planned opening: March 2027; 6 months' time

Technical
- Line length: 28.72 km (17.85 mi)
- Number of tracks: Double-track
- Character: Elevated and at-grade
- Track gauge: 5 ft 6 in (1,676 mm) broad gauge
- Electrification: 25 kV 50 Hz AC overhead catenary

The Mallige line is an under-construction Bengaluru Suburban rail line between Benniganahalli to Chikkabanavara. The 27 km (17 mi) long broad-gauge line was approved in 2019 with its construction works commencing in 2022. The line which is also referred as 'corridor-2' is being built in two packages C2A and C2B respectively. The C1A package consists eight stations, while the C1B has four. The line is named after the flower Mallige (Jasmine) in Kannada.

== History ==
The route between Benniganahalli and Chikkabanavara was part of the longer line (83 km; 52 mi) of Tumakuru–Yeshavanthapur–Benniganahalli proposed under 'Call To Action' report of 2010. Later in 2019, the line saw reduction in length with termination in Chikkabanavara, in Northwest of Bengaluru.

On 7 October 2020, government of India approved the four corridors of Bengaluru suburban rail project including the KSR Bengaluru – Devanahalli line and its Airport branch. The line was then named after the regional flower's Kannada name Mallige.

It was also the first line among four where construction works began. In 2024, minister for railways in Karnataka, V Somanna stated that the Mallige line along with Kanaka (line 4) were prioritised.

In september 2024, the construction progress on the line stood at 28% with 22% of the financial expenditure. The line was then targeted for completion in June 2026. However, the deadline was later pushed to March 2027.

=== Construction ===
History
Section	Opening	Terminals		Length	Stations
C2A	March 2027	Benniaganahalli	Yeshavanthapur	16 km (9.9 mi)	8
C2B	March 2027	Yeshavanthapur	Chikkabanavara	12 km (7.5 mi)	4

== Stations ==
Mallige Line
#	Station Name		Opening	Connections / Transits / Terminals	Station Layout	Platform Level Type
#	English	Kannada	Opening	Connections / Transits / Terminals	Station Layout	Platform Level Type
1	Benniganahalli	ಬೆನ್ನಿಗಾನಹಳ್ಳಿ	2028	Purple Line; Kanaka (Under-construction)	TBD	Side
2	Kasthuri Nagar	ಕಸ್ತೂರಿ ನಗರ	2028	Blue Line	TBD	Side
3	Seva Nagar	ಸೇವಾನಗರ	2028		TBD	Side
4	Banaswadi	ಬಾಣಸವಾಡಿ	2028		TBD	Side
5	Kaveri Nagar (Future Station)	ಕಾವೇರಿನಗರ	2028		TBD	Side
6	Nagawara	ನಾಗವಾರ	2028	Pink Line; Blue Line	TBD	Side
7	Kanaka Nagar	ಕನಕನಗರ	2028		TBD	Side
8	Hebbala	ಹೆಬ್ಬಾಳ	2028	Blue Line; Orange Line; Red Line	TBD	Side
9	Lottegollahalli (Proposed)	ಲೊಟ್ಟೆಗೊಲ್ಲಹಳ್ಳಿ	2028		TBD	Side
10	Mathikere	ಮತ್ತಿಕೆರೆ	2028		TBD	Side
11	Yeshavanthapura	ಯಶವಂತಪುರ	2028	Green Line; Sampige (Planned)	TBD	Side
12	Jalahalli (Future Station)	ಜಾಲಹಳ್ಳಿ	2028		TBD	Side
13	Shettyhalli	ಶೆಟ್ಟಿಹಳ್ಳಿ	2028		TBD	Side
14	Maidarahallli	ಮೈದರಹಳ್ಳಿ	2028		TBD	Side
15	Chikkabanavara	ಚಿಕ್ಕಬಾಣಾವರ	2028		TBD	Side
16	Soladevanahalli (Future Station)	ಸೋಲದೇವನಹಳ್ಳ	2028		TBD	Side

== See also ==
- Urban rail transit in India
  - Bengaluru Suburban Railway
  - Namma Metro
  - Sampige line
  - Parijaata line
  - Kanaka line
