= Bangalore Bus Rapid Transit System =

Bangalore BRTS

Overview
- Owner: Bruhat Bengaluru Mahanagara Palike
- Locale: Bangalore, Karnataka, India
- Transit type: Bus rapid transit

Operation
- Operation will start: Cancelled
- Operator: Bangalore Metropolitan Transport Corporation

Technical
- System length: 282 kilometres (175 mi)

Bangalore BRTS was a proposed bus rapid transit system in Bangalore, Karnataka, India. Beginning with a comprehensive report in 2007, and even earlier, several proposals were made to implement a BRTS in Bangalore.

In December 2016, the Karnataka Government cancelled the project. Mahendra Jain, additional chief secretary (urban development department), stated that the government did not consider the project feasible "as we have already planned for the Namma Metro." He further explained, "The decision was taken because there was no sufficient road width available for the BRTS. The balance carriage way would be very less so we decided not to take it forward. As we have planned for Metro, two public transportation systems cannot be executed on one stretch."

== Recommendations in CTTP, 2007 ==
A transport survey carried out in 2007, referred to as CTTP, recommended Bangalore BRTS, with 14 routes totaling 282 km. CTTP recommended following routes :

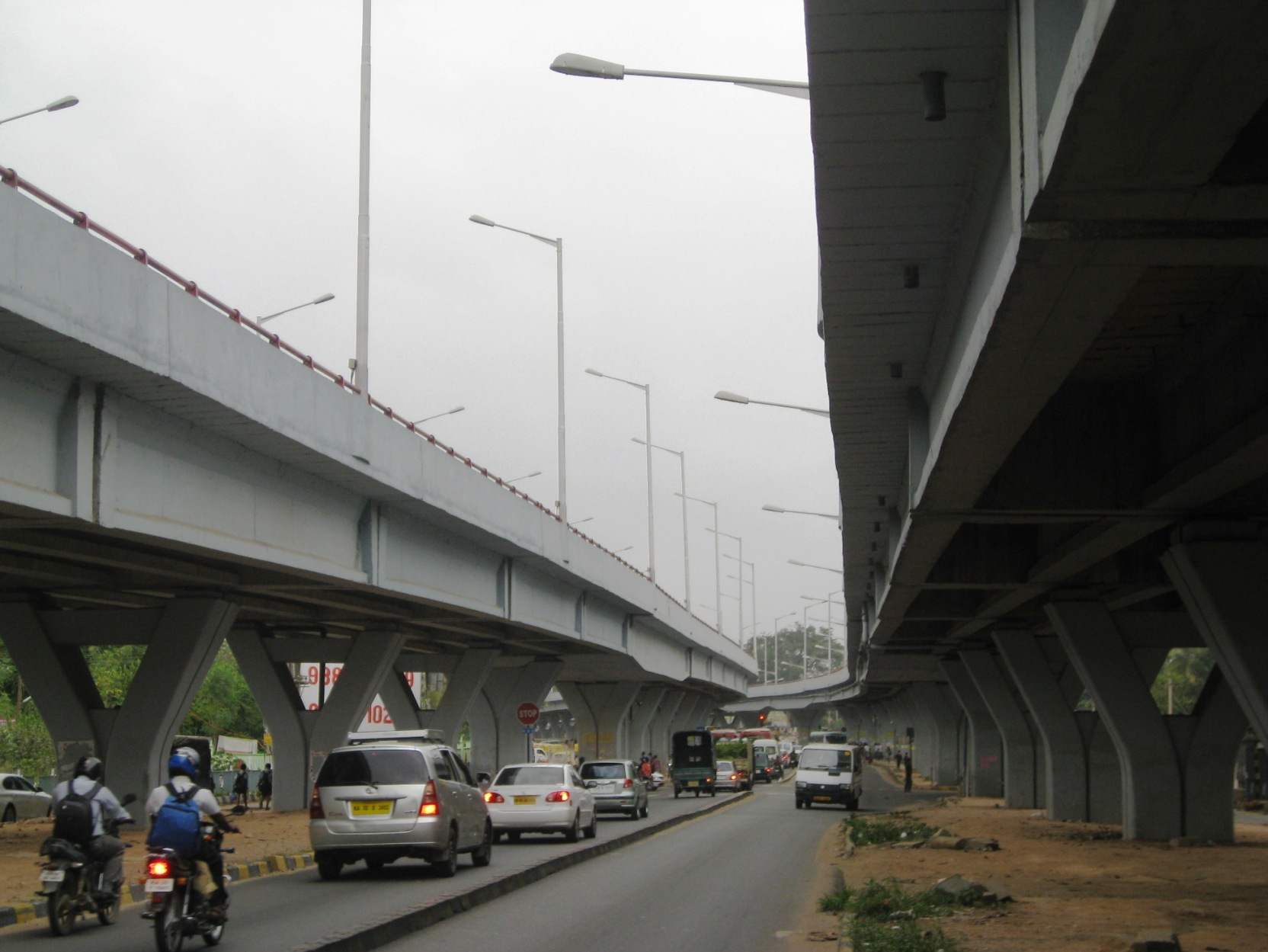
BRTS lanes under the flyover at the junction of Sarjapur Road and Outer Ring Road at Agara.

- Hebbal to Bannerghatta Road along eastern crescent of outer ring road (33.0 km)
- Benniganahalli (ORR) to PRR along old Madras Road (7.0 km)
- From ORR to Hosur Rd along Hi-tech Corridor (8.0 km)
- Hosur Road to Tumkur Road along PRR (western part) (41.0 km)
- Tumkur Road-PRR Junction to Hosur Road along PRR via Tirumanahalli, Old Madras Road, Whitefield (76.0 km)
- Along Core Ring Road (30.0 km)
- Vidyaranyapura to Nagavarapalya via Hebbal, Jayamahal Road, Queens Road, M.G. Road, Ulsoor, Indranagar, CV Raman Nagar (29.0 km)
- Kengeri Satellite Town to J.P. Nagar along Uttarahalli Road, Kodipur (13.0 km)
- Banashankari III stage to Banashankari VI stage Ext. along Ittumadu Road, Turahalli, Thalaghattapura (6.0 km)
- Domlur Ext. to Koramangala along inner ring road (5.0 km)
- PRR (Mulur) to Maruti Nagar (up to Hitech corridor) along Sarjapur Road (7.0 km)
- Peenya to PRR along Tumkur Road (6.0 km)
- Old Madras Road near Indiranagar to ORR near Banaswadi along Baiyyappanahalli Road -Banaswadi Road (5.5 km)
- Hebbal to Devanahalli Airport along Bellary Road (25.0 km)
- Total 282 km

== Bus Priority Lane ==
To avoid the traffic congestion and its impact on public transport, Bengaluru Traffic Police and Bangalore Metropolitan Transport Corporation initiated Bus Priority Lane in part of Outer Ring Road Bangalore in November 2019. To impose this, BTP has decided to have traffic fines for private vehicle drivers on violating Bus Priority Lanes.

Dedicated bus lanes are designed to separate public buses from private traffic, which can reduce delays and improve service reliability. By allowing for smoother driving conditions, such lanes are also intended to lower fuel consumption, reduce air and noise pollution, and encourage private vehicle commuters to shift toward public transit during peak hours.

A servery conducted by Citizen for Bangalore (a civic activist group) shows that also revealed that the number of people spending over two hours daily on bus commute has substantially reduced by 62 per cent since the introduction of the city's first BPL on the Silk Board-K R Puram route.

== Other proposals ==
There have also been other proposals for BRTS routes, some of these talk of new routes, and some overlap with CTTP recommendations.

=== Radial Corridors ===
In 2009, on recommendation from Agenda for Bangalore Infrastructure Development (ABIDe), City of Bangalore started investments to enhance 12 radial corridors for land based public transport. A distinctly branded bus service called Big10 was started by BMTC as part of the project. There are proposals to consider some of these corridors for BRTS.

=== Ring Roads ===
CTTP and few other proposals have talked of implementing BRTS on two large ring roads in Bangalore. BRTS was considered by BDA for Outer Ring Road, but the road has instead been taken for conversion to a signal free corridor. BRTS has also been talked about for the Peripheral Ring Road (PRR). However, since PRR itself is still in design and planning stage, there has not been much progress regarding BRTS

== Issues and opposition ==
Some local public transport observers and citizens feel that most road corridors are too narrow for developing dedicated lanes for BRTS. Further, enforcement of traffic is generally seen to be weak, and many doubt if the city will be able to enforce dedicate lanes. Last, many feel that city is not mature yet to accept dedicated lanes, and private vehicle users may not like the proposal.

However, many feel that despite public statements of support for the concept, BRTS implementations have not made big progress due to lack of clear ownership between BMTC, BBMP, BDA and City Traffic Police.

=== CTTP or Ring Road recommendations ===
The State Government has not taken up all recommendations from CTTP. BDA has been working on parts of the proposal since 2008. More recently, in early 2010, BDA had started on a detailed project report to implement BRTS on the eastern loop Outer Ring Road.

=== Bus Priority System ===
To work over the perceptions against BRTS, Praja Bangalore, a citizen advocacy group is pushing for Bus Priority System, wherein there would be dedicated lanes, specialized signals, underpasses for the buses only at the critical choke points on critical radial corridors. Bangalore could move towards full-fledged BRTS once the benefits of Bus Priority help work over the negative perceptions.
