= Kalkere =

Village in India

Kalkere is an area in Horamavu, Bangalore, Karnataka, India.

It is surrounded by Ramamurthy Nagar, K.Channasandra and Horamavu. For a relatively small region, Kalkere houses many noticeable landmarks such as temples, educational institutions and leisure resorts. Temples in Kalkere include Shrengeri Shankara Mutt, Eashwara Temple, Veerabhadra Swamy Temple, Veeranjunaiya Temple, Kempamma Temple, Sundara Hanuman Temple and many others. Institutions include, a government school and a government library, Sunshine Children's Home And School, Bible Society of India, AMC Group of Institutions, Union Bank of India - staff college, SVKM's Narsee Monjee Institute of Management Studies and Ryan International school. Other landmarks include a park and a pond commonly called as 'Kalkere Kalyani'.
