= Praja Bangalore =

Nonprofit organization

Praja Bangalore, also known as Praja.in and Praja RAAG, is an organization of citizens who take active interest in urban civic issues concerning Bangalore. Unlike the traditional activist groups and NGOs in India, members of this non-profit group interact largely via Internet-based social media tools.

== History ==
The group started in 2007 when enthusiasts built a collaborative blog for discussions on civic issues pertaining to Bangalore. Content was moderated for language and references, and tended to be very analytical. The virtual group met face-to-face for the first time during a visit to the then under-construction Bangalore International Airport. As the virtual community grew in size, some members felt the need for a real-world organization to interact with local governments, in order to better effect changes. A society was created to formalize this non-profit organization.

== Current status ==
Praja RAAG is largely confined to Bangalore, though there have been efforts to spread the project to the cities of Mysore, Pune, and Chennai. The group has evolved to undertake projects based on volunteers' time and support, along with resources from academic institutions, local governments, and industry partners. The group has so far focused largely on land-based public transportation issues. They have interacted with BMTC regarding marketing, availability of information and last mile issues, and with South Western Railways for Bangalore Commuter Rail.

== Projects ==
In November 2009, in association with the Center for Infrastructure, Sustainable Transport and Urban Planning of the Indian Institute of Science, Praja RAAG organized the first edition of Mobilicity, a brainstorming event designed to produce practical transportation solutions and kick start sustainable mobility initiatives for Bangalore. After this first edition of Mobilicity, members of Praja RAAG helped BMTC conceptualize and implement the Bus Day campaign, which promoted the use of buses instead of cars. The group is also spearheading an advocacy project for implementing a Commuter Rail System in Bangalore. Thanks to this advocacy, and support from Department of Urban Land Transport, state of Karnataka, RITES undertook a detailed feasibility study indicating cost estimates and a phase wise plan for starting Commuter Rail Service in Bangalore. Among other recent projects, Praja RAAG has done significant advocacy for Non Motorized Transportation (NMT) via designated cycle tracks, and has been pitching for BRTS in Bangalore via advocacy efforts for a concept named Bus Priority System.

== Awards ==
The citizen community site praja.in won an award for Social Media Usage at the India eGov 2.0 Awards in October 2010. In October 2011, Praja RAAG received a special mention from Volvo for encouraging positive initiatives to support sustainable Mobility. In October 2012, Namma Railu, a Praja RAAG project was declared the runner up for Volvo Sustainable Mobility Award.

== Criticism ==
Praja RAAG has been criticized for its largely internet-based presence. Many citizens are unable to access the internet, and are therefore unable to participate in Praja RAAG initiatives and the citizen community site operated by it.
