= Shivaji Nagar metro station (Bengaluru) =

Upcoming Namma Metro station under Pink Line

Shivaji Nagara

General information
- Location: Shivajinagara Bus Station, Shivaji Nagar, Bengaluru, Karnataka 560001
- Coordinates: 12.98358°N 77.60306°E
- System: Namma Metro station
- Owner: Bangalore Metro Rail Corporation Ltd (BMRCL)
- Operator: Namma Metro
- Line: Pink Line
- Platforms: Island platform (TBC); Platform-1 → Nagawara; Platform-2 → Kalena Agrahara; Platform Numbers (TBC)
- Tracks: 2 (TBC)
- Connections: Shivajinagara BMTC Terminus

Construction
- Structure type: Underground, Double track
- Platform levels: 2 (TBC)
- Parking: (TBC)
- Accessible: (TBC)
- Architect: Larsen & Toubro

Other information
- Status: Under Construction
- Station code: (TBC)

History
- Opening: May 2027; 6 months' time (TBC)
- Electrified: (TBC)

Services
| Preceding station | Namma Metro | Following station |
|---|---|---|
| Cantonment Railway Station towards Nagawara | Pink Line (Operational around May 2027) | Mahatma Gandhi Road towards Kalena Agrahara |
Route map
Location

Shivaji Nagara is an upcoming important underground metro station on the north–south corridor of the Pink Line of Namma Metro in Bengaluru, India. This metro station will consist of the main Shivajinagar neighbourhood having the main Shivajinagara Bus Terminus leading towards many prime locations like Kempegowda (Majestic) Bus Station, Bagalur, Yelahanka and Hebbal. This also includes other prime locations such as Commercial Street, M. Chinnaswamy Stadium, Karnataka State Cricket Association and St. Mary's Basilica. Cubbon Park will be the alternative metro station coming under Purple Line (Namma Metro).

As per the latest updates, this metro station, under the second phase, covering the total distance of 13.8 km stretch (Dairy Circle - Nagawara) is expected to be operational around May 2027 instead of December 2026

== History ==
In June 2017, Bangalore Metro Rail Corporation Limited (BMRCL) sought bids for constructing the Shivaji Nagar metro station along the 2.76 km National Military School - Shivaji Nagar stretch of the 21.25 km Pink Line of Namma Metro. In November 2019, Larsen & Toubro (L&T) emerged as the lowest bidders for this stretch which aligned closely with the original estimate, thus leading to a successful award for this company. They commenced the construction of this metro station as per the agreements.

== Station Layout ==
Station Layout - To Be Confirmed

| G | Street level | Exit/ Entrance |
| L1 | Mezzanine | Fare control, station agent, Ticket/token, shops |
| L2 | Platform 2 Southbound | Towards → Kalena Agrahara; Next Station: Mahatma Gandhi Road; Change at the next station for Purple Line |
| L2 | Island platform | Doors will open on the right |
| L2 | Platform 1 Northbound | Towards ← Nagawara; Next Station: Cantonment Railway Station |
| L2 |

== See also ==
- Bangalore
- List of Namma Metro stations
- Transport in Karnataka
- List of metro systems
- List of rapid transit systems in India
- Bangalore Metropolitan Transport Corporation
