= Cantonment Railway Station metro station =

Upcoming Namma Metro station under Pink Line

Cantonment Railway Station

General information
- Location: Sulthangunta, Shivaji Nagar, Bengaluru, Karnataka 560051
- Coordinates: 12.99142°N 77.60606°E
- System: Namma Metro station
- Owner: Bangalore Metro Rail Corporation Ltd (BMRCL)
- Operator: Namma Metro
- Lines: Pink Line; Inner Ring Line
- Platforms: Island platform (TBC); Platform-1 → Nagawara; Platform-2 → Kalena Agrahara; Platform Numbers (TBC)
- Tracks: 2 (TBC)
- Connections: Bangalore Cantonment

Construction
- Structure type: Underground, Double track
- Platform levels: 2 (TBC)
- Parking: (TBC)
- Accessible: (TBC)
- Architect: Larsen & Toubro

Other information
- Status: Under Construction
- Station code: (TBC)

History
- Opening: May 2027; 6 months' time (TBC)
- Electrified: (TBC)

Services
Preceding station	Namma Metro	Following station
Pottery Town towards Nagawara	Pink Line (Operational around May 2027)	Shivaji Nagar towards Kalena Agrahara
Route map
Location

Cantonment Railway Station is an upcoming important underground metro station on the north–south corridor of the Pink Line of Namma Metro in Bengaluru, India. This metro station will consist of the main Bengaluru Cantonment railway station for passengers heading towards the city (KSR Bengaluru), Kengeri, Krishnarajapuram, Hosur or Bangarapet Junction. It will also include many prime locations such as the main Coles Park, Karnataka Badminton Association, St. Mary's Basilica and residential suburban areas like Fraser Town, Shivajinagar and Richards Town.

As per the latest updates, this metro station, under the second phase, covering the total underground distance of 13.8 km (Dairy Circle - Nagawara) is expected to be operational around May 2027 instead of December 2026

== History ==
In June 2017, Bangalore Metro Rail Corporation Limited (BMRCL) sought bids for constructing the Cantonment Railway Station metro station along the 2.88 km Shivaji Nagar - Shadi Mahal Ramp stretch of the 21.25 km Pink Line of Namma Metro. In November 2019, Larsen & Toubro (L&T) emerged as the lowest bidders for this stretch which aligned closely with the original estimate, thus leading to successful award for this company. They commenced the construction of this metro station as per the agreements.

== Station Layout ==
Station Layout - To Be Confirmed

G	Street level	Exit/ Entrance
L1	Mezzanine	Fare control, station agent, Ticket/token, shops
L2	Platform 2 Southbound	Towards → Kalena Agrahara; Next Station: Shivaji Nagar
L2	Island platform | Doors will open on the right
L2	Platform 1 Northbound	Towards ← Nagawara; Next Station: Pottery Town
L2

== See also ==
- Bangalore
- List of Namma Metro stations
- Transport in Karnataka
- List of metro systems
- List of rapid transit systems in India
- Bangalore Metropolitan Transport Corporation
