= Muthyalanagar =

- neighbourhood
- Location within Bengaluru
- Coordinates: 13.0285°N 77.555°E
- Country: India
- State: Karnataka
- District: Bangalore

Languages
  - Official: Kannada
- Time zone: UTC+5:30 (IST)
- PIN: 560054

Muthyalanagar is a residential area located in Northwestern Bangalore in the Indian state of Karnataka, bounded by Yeswanthpur, Mathikere and M.S Ramaiah Nagar. A temple dedicated to Muthyalamma Goddess is located here. Projectseem18 a complete, Electrical components, Electronic components, Turningjobs and cable solution for Defence Sector located in MES Road An 85-acre (340,000 m^{2}) park called the Jayaprakash Narayana Bioversity Park is situated beside the area. It is away from the moribund city life.
