= Nayandahalli railway station =

Railway station in Karnataka, India

Nayandahalli
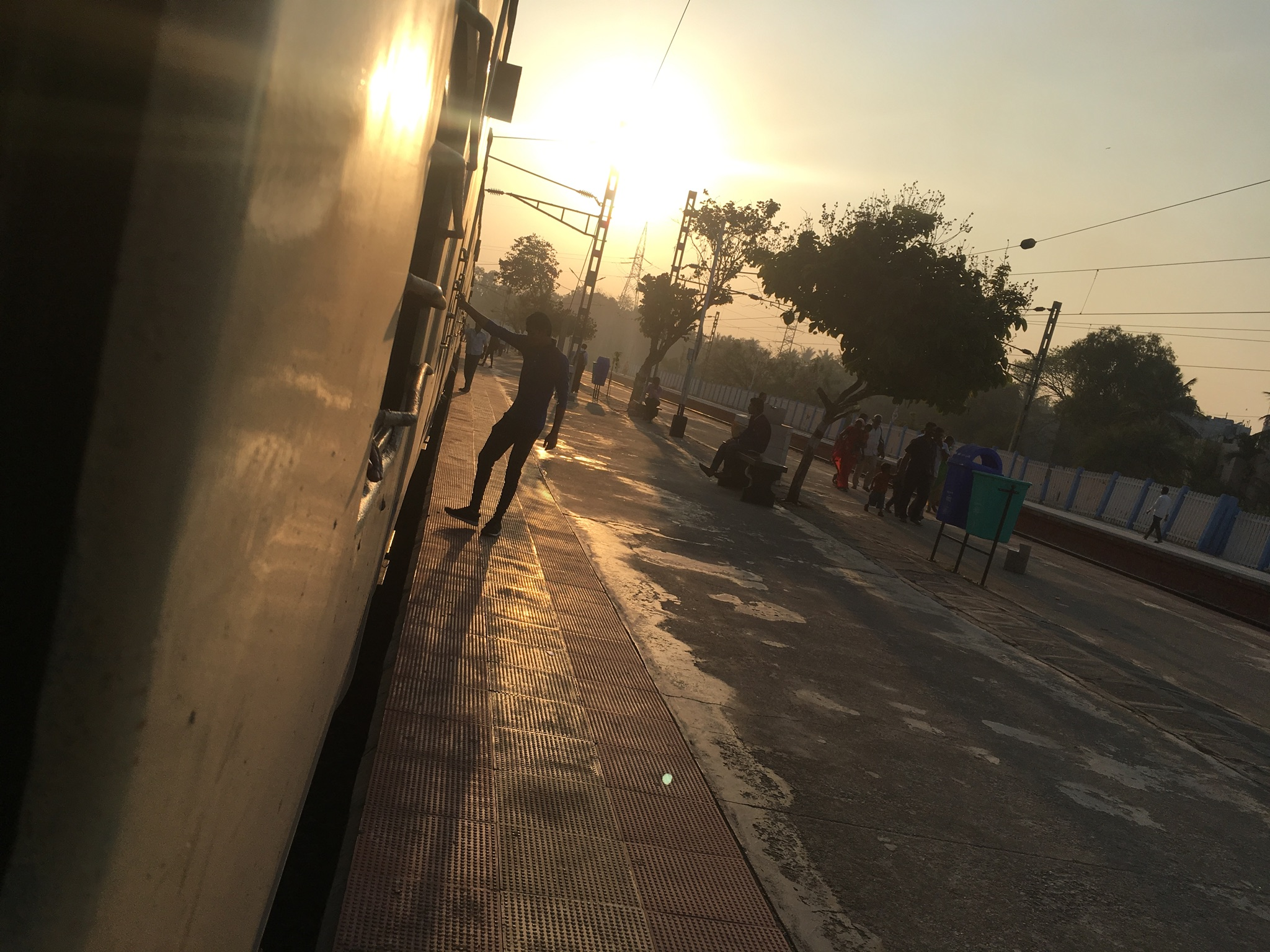

General information
- Location: Bangalore, Karnataka; India
- Coordinates: 12.9414°N 77.5186°E
- Elevation: 804 metres (2,638 ft)
- System: Indian Railways station
- Owner: Indian Railways
- Operator: South Western Railway zone
- Line: Mysore–Bangalore railway line
- Platforms: 4
- Tracks: 4
- Connections: Auto stand

Construction
- Structure type: Standard (on ground station)
- Parking: Yes
- Cycle facilities: No

Other information
- Status: Functioning
- Station code: NYH
- Zone(s): South Western Railway zone
- Division(s): Bangalore

History
- Opened: 2008

Services
Preceding station	Indian Railways	Following station
Jnanabharati Halt towards Mysore	South Western Railway zone Mysore–Bangalore City line	Krishnadevaraya halt towards Bangalore
Route map
Location

Nayandahalli railway station (station code: NYH) is an Indian Railways Train station located in Nayandahalli, Bangalore in the Indian state of Karnataka and is located about 10 km away from the Bangalore City railway station. This station serves the Rajarajeshwari Nagar, Baapuji Nagara, Deepanjalinagara, and Vijayanagara areas of Bangalore city. It is located on Mysore–Bangalore line

== Structure and expansion ==
Nayandahalli railway station has two platforms each running 400m in length, shelters, lighting, benches and a booking office facility available.

== Rails ==
The trains between Bangalore and Mysore, Channapattana and Tumkur and local trains halt in this station. The surrounding area's commuters of Vijayanagara, Rajarajeshwari nagara, katriguppe use this station.

== See also ==
- Bengaluru Commuter Rail
- Mysore–Bangalore railway line
- Krishnadevaraya halt railway station
