= Krishnadevaraya halt railway station =

Railway station in Karnataka, India

Krishnadevaraya Halt Kr̥ṣṇadēvarāya Nilugaḍe Krshnadevaraay Padaav

General information
- Location: Bangalore, Karnataka; India
- Coordinates: 12.9176°N 77.6900°E
- Elevation: 804 metres (2,638 ft)
- System: Indian Railways station
- Owner: Indian Railways
- Operator: South Western Railway zone
- Line: Mysore–Bangalore railway line
- Platforms: 2
- Tracks: 2
- Connections: Auto stand

Construction
- Structure type: Standard (on ground station)
- Parking: No
- Cycle facilities: No

Other information
- Status: Functioning
- Station code: KNDV
- Zone(s): South Western Railway zone
- Division(s): Bangalore

History
- Opened: 2014

Services
Preceding station	Indian Railways	Following station
Nayandahalli towards Mysore	South Western Railway zone Mysore -Bangalore City line	Bangalore City towards Bangalore
Route map
Location

Krishnadevaraya Halt railway station (station code: KNDV) is an Indian Railways Train station located in Attiguppe, Bangalore in the Indian state of Karnataka which is located about 5 km away from the Bangalore City. This station serves the Attiguppe, RPC layout, Baapuji Nagara, Deepanjalinagara, and Vijayanagara areas of Bangalore city.

== Structure and expansion ==
Krishnadevaraya halt has two platforms each running to 400m in length, shelters, lighting, benches and a booking office facility available.

== See also ==
- Mysore–Bangalore railway line
- Nayandahalli
