= Heelalige railway station =

Railway station in Karnataka, India

Heelalige
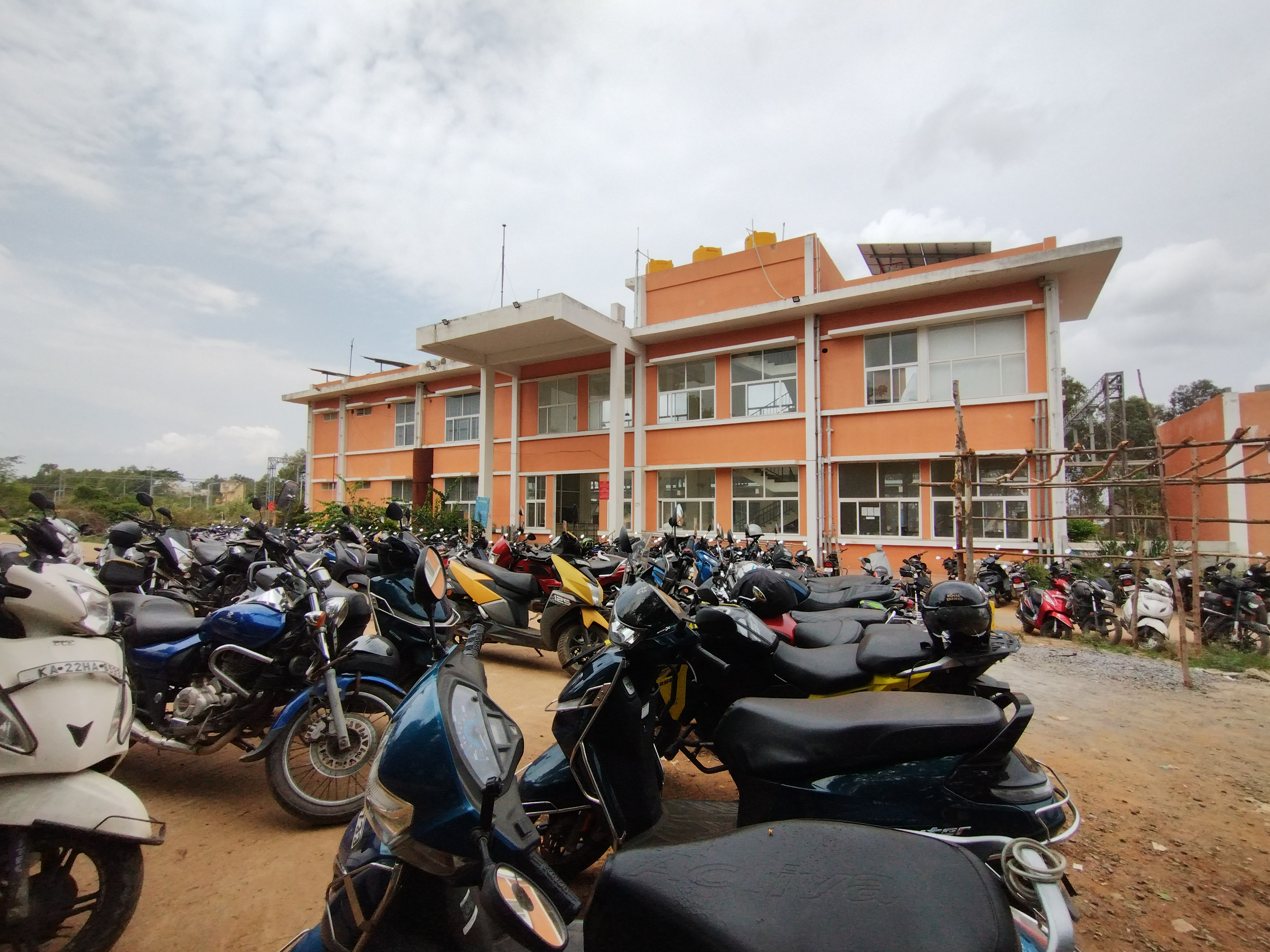
- Heelalige railway station in 2026

General information
- Location: Heelalige, Bengaluru Urban district, Karnataka, India; India
- System: Indian Railways station
- Owner: Indian Railways
- Operator: South Western Railway zone
- Line: Bengaluru–Hosur line (part of Salem–Bengaluru line) • Kanaka line (under construction)
- Platforms: 2
- Tracks: 4

Construction
- Structure type: Standard (at grade)

Other information
- Status: Functioning
Route map
Location

Heelalige railway station (station code: HLE) is a railway station serving southern Bengaluru suburbs such as Heelalige, Chandapura and the Electronic City area, on the Bengaluru–Hosur line of the South Western Railway zone.

== Bengaluru Suburban Railway ==
Heelalige is the southern terminal of the Kanaka line (Corridor 4) of the Bengaluru Suburban Railway, which will run between Heelalige and Rajanukunte via Benniganahalli, Channasandra and Yelahanka.

== Heelalige Goods Terminal ==
Adjacent to the station is the Heelalige Goods Terminal, commissioned to handle freight and decongest other Bengaluru terminals. Freight operations commenced in December 2024, with the inaugural unloading of cement rakes serving the Bengaluru–Hosur industrial belt.

== Services and connectivity ==
The station provides commuter access to Electronic City and nearby industrial areas on the Bengaluru–Hosur section. It is part of the Bengaluru railway division of South Western Railway.

== See also ==
- Bengaluru Suburban Railway
- Electronic City
- South Western Railway zone
- Bengaluru–Hosur line
