= Yelahanka Junction railway station =

Railway station in Karnataka, India

Yelahanka Junction Yalahaṅka Jaṅkṣan
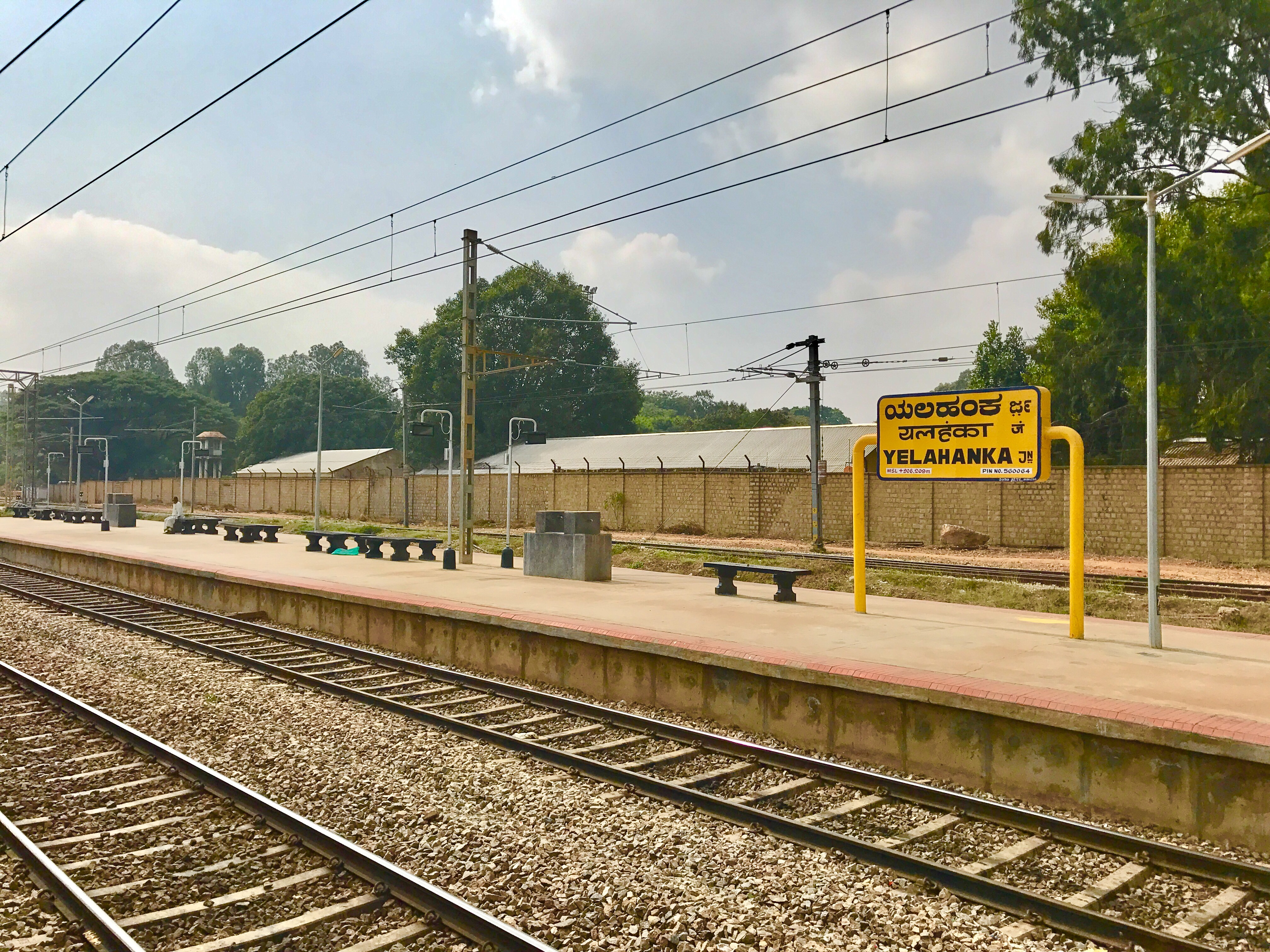

General information
- Location: Yelahanka Bangalore, Karnataka; India
- Coordinates: 13.02°N 77.55°E
- Elevation: 915.009 metres (3,002.00 ft)
- System: Indian Railways station
- Owner: Indian Railways
- Line: Quadruple Electric Line
- Platforms: 5
- Tracks: 5
- Connections: Taxi

Construction
- Structure type: At Grade
- Platform levels: 1
- Parking: Yes

Other information
- Status: Active
- Station code: YNK
- Fare zone: South Western
Route map
Location
- Location within India Location within Karnataka

Yelahanka Junction railway station (station code: YNK) is an Indian Railways station in the outskirts of Bangalore in the Indian state of Karnataka, located in Yelahanka locality about 25 km away from the Bangalore City. This station is located on the Guntakal–Bangalore line.

== Junction ==
Yelahanka railway station is a junction on the Guntakal–Bangalore section, Bangalore–Kolar line, and one line connecting to Bangalore City line–Chennai Central via Krishnarajapuram.

== See also ==
- Bengaluru Commuter Rail

Preceding station	Indian Railways	Following station
Bettahalasoor towards ?	South Western Railway zone Bangalore–Kolar Line	Thanisandra towards ?
Kodigehalli towards ?	South Western Railway zone Guntakal–Bangalore section	Bettahalsoor towards ?
Rajanukunte towards ?	South Western Railway zone Chennai–Bangalore line	Thanisandra towards ?
