= Bengaluru Suburban Railway =

Under-construction suburban rail network in Bengaluru, India

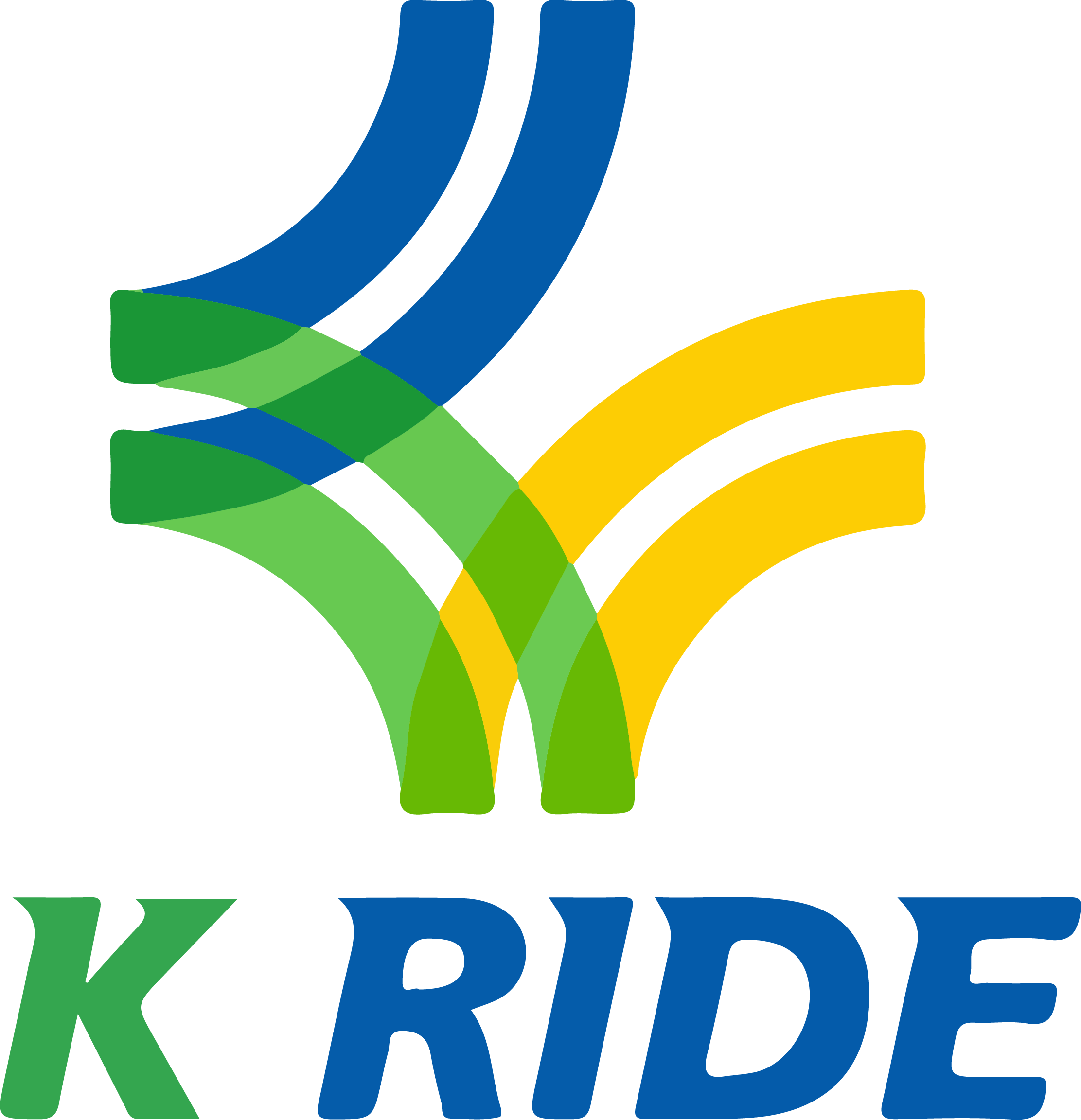

Overview
- Native name: Beṅgaḷūru upanagara railu sēve
- Owner: Rail Infrastructure Development Company (Karnataka) Limited K-RIDE
- Area served: Bengaluru Metropolitan Region
- Locale: Bengaluru, Karnataka, India
- Transit type: Suburban rail
- Number of lines: 4
- Line number: Under construction Sampige Mallige Parijaata Kanaka
- Number of stations: 69
- Website: K-RIDE

Operation
- Operation will start: December 2028; 2 years' time
- Operator: Bengaluru Suburban Rail Company Limited

Technical
- System length: 160.457 kilometres (99.703 mi)
- Track gauge: 5 ft 6 in (1,676 mm) broad gauge
System map

The Bengaluru Suburban Railway is an under-construction suburban rail network for the city of Bengaluru in Karnataka. Since the first proposal in 1983, several others were made but to no avail until a revised proposal of length 161 km (100 mi) was approved in the 2019 Railway Budget. The network is set to have four lines in total with two of them planned to open by December 2026.

The four lines of Bengaluru Suburban Rail Project (BSRP) are named after regional flowers in Kannada: Sampige (Magnolia champaca), Mallige (Jasmine), Parijaata (Nyctanthes arbor-tristis) and Kanaka (Crossandra infundibuliformis). When abbreviated, they form the Kannada word 'Sa-m-par-ka' which means connectivity.

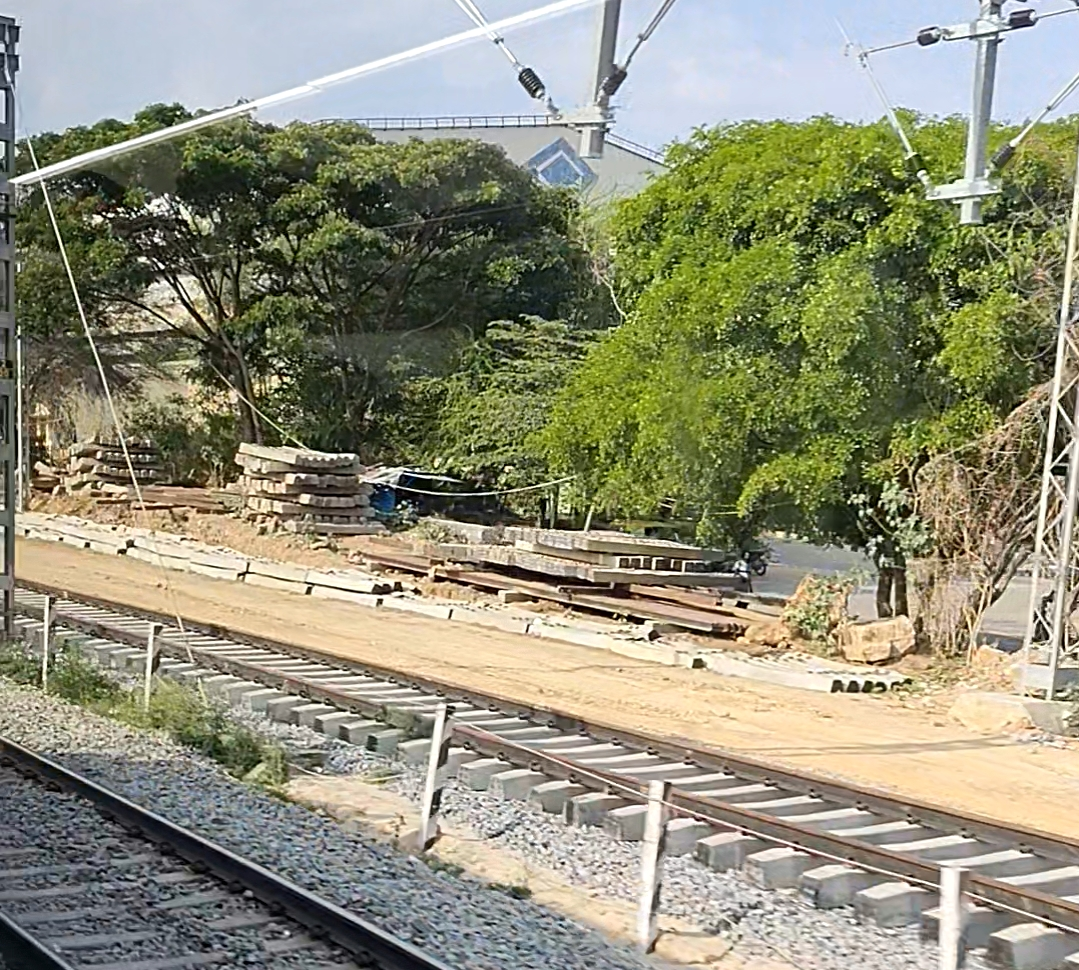
Construction activities of Kanaka line near Dooravani Nagara in East Bengaluru.

There have been a total of six proposals with the RITES (2018) proposal being approved in 2019 after a few amendments. The construction works for the project commenced in 2022 on the two priority lines, Mallige (line 2) and Kanaka (line 4) which are planned to be operationalised by the end of 2026. The remaining two lines, Sampige (line 1) and Parijaata (line 3) are planned to be opened by 2028. But, as of 2026 opening dates have been pushed to 2030.

Map of Bengaluru's urban rail network with operational, under-construction and planned lines of Namma Metro and Bengaluru Suburban Railway.

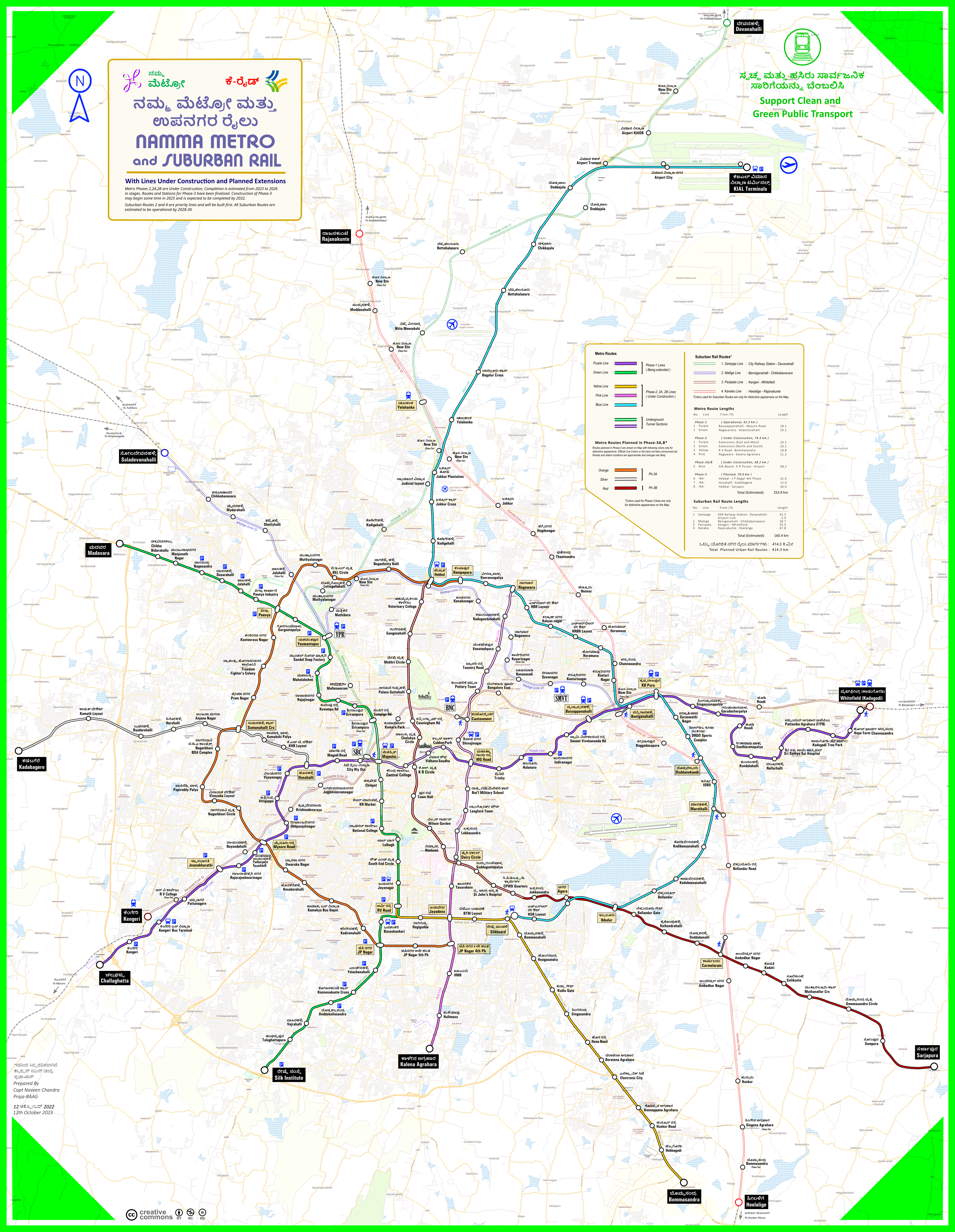
Geographic map

Transit diagram

== History ==
=== Background ===
Unlike Mumbai, Kolkata and Chennai which had India's earliest and extensive suburban railway network, Bengaluru did not except for a single rail service in 1963 for Hindustan Aeronautics Limited employees to commute from KSR Bengaluru to Vimanapura railway station. The city's first ever suburban railway proposal was dated to early 1960s in the form of a circular railway connecting existing Bengaluru Central, Cantonment and Bengaluru East railway stations with new railway line and stations in Dommaluru, Koramangala, Jayanagara, Banashankari and back to Bengaluru Central.

In 1983, a formal suburban rail system for the city had first been proposed by a team from Southern Railway under then Railway Minister C. K. Jaffer Sharief and Member of Parliament representing Bengaluru. Their recommendation had been to invest in three suburban rail lines and a 58 km (36 mi) ring railway. The package was estimated to cost ₹650 crore (equivalent to ₹120 billion or US$1.3 billion in 2026) spread over a 25-year period.

In 1993, Minister of Railways, India C. K. Jaffer Sharief influenced the State of Karnataka to establish a committee to look into mass rapid transit for the city. This committee recommended essentially the same put forward by Southern Railway in 1983 and the same circular railway. Both in 1983 and 1993 the proposal was rejected by then Prime Minister of India.

=== Early proposals ===
In 2007, RITES (Rail Indian Technical and Economic Services) was commissioned by the Government of Karnataka to conduct a CTTP (Comprehensive Traffic & Transportation Plan) for the city of Bengaluru. Their report called for ten suburban rail routes totalling 204 km (127 mi). As per the report, suburban rail (along existing rail routes) would have cost much less than mass rapid transit system.

2007 proposal
Line	Length (km)
Kengeri – KSR Bengaluru	13
KSR Bengaluru – Whitefield	24
KSR Bengaluru – Baiyappanahalli via Lottegollahalli	23
Lottegollahalli – Yelahanka Junction	7
Banaswadi – BMR Boundary	29
Kengeri – BMR Boundary	9
Yeshwanthpura Junction – BMR Boundary	14
BMR Boundary – Hosur	12
BMR Boundary – Ramanagara	23
BMR Boundary – Tumakuru	50
Total	204

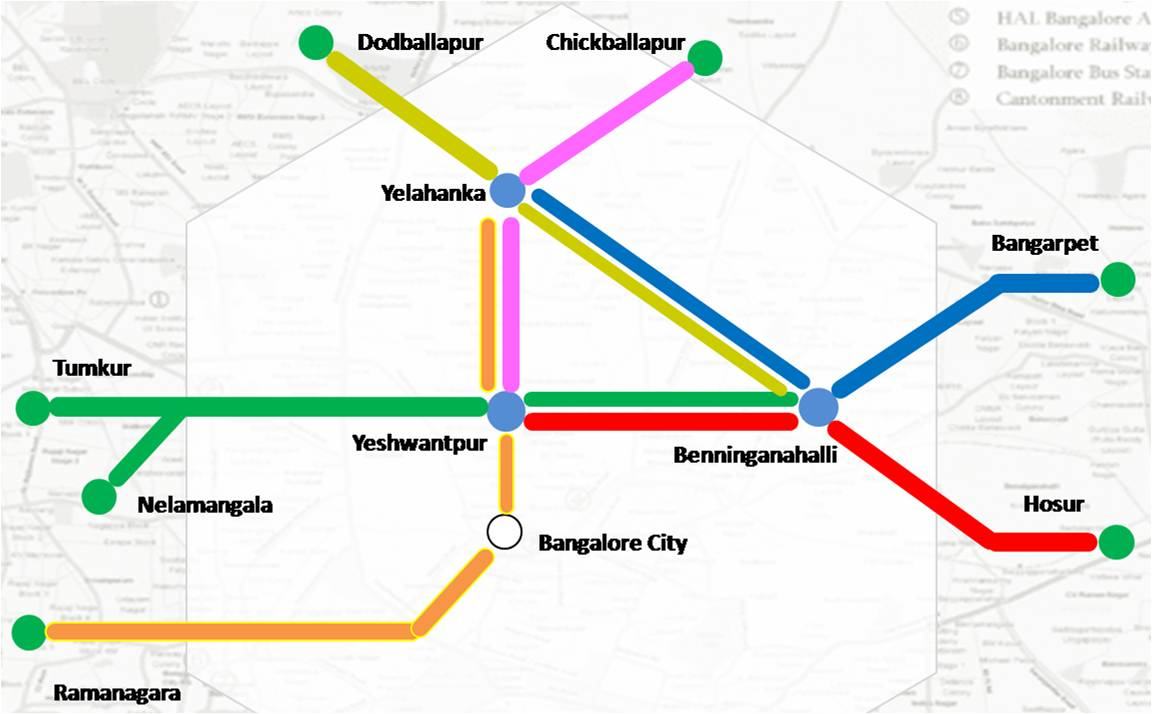
Proposal made by Praja in 'Call To Action' report (July 2010)

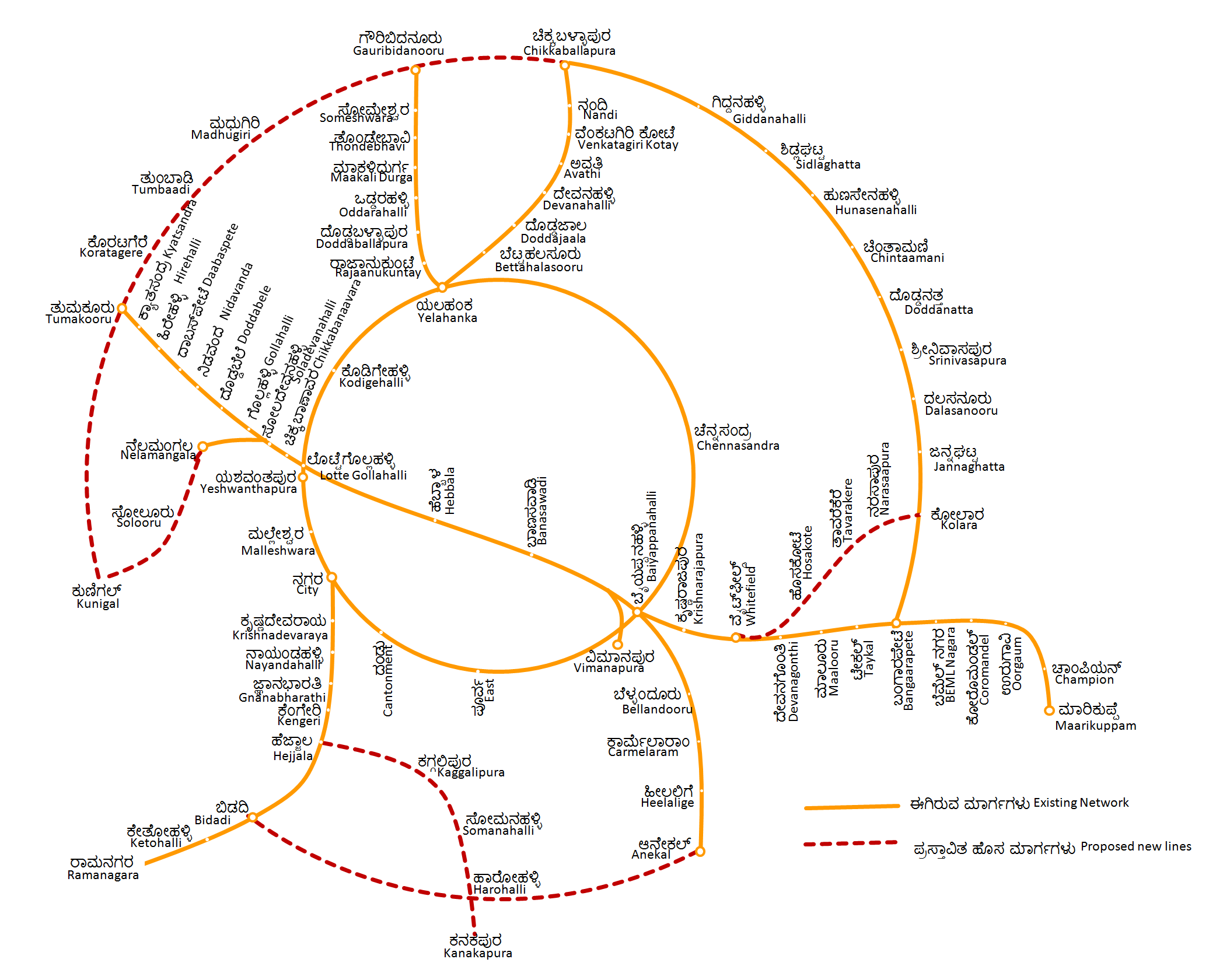
Existing and proposed rail network

In July 2010, a proposal was made by Praja Bangalore in a 'Call To Action' report. This plan was supported & presented at the center for infrastructure, Sustainable Transportation and Urban Planning (CisTup), Indian Institute of Science (IISc), Bengaluru. The proposal had suggested a 376 km network around three hubs (Yesvantpur Junction, Benniganahalli & Yelahanka Junction) with 42 new stations.

2010 proposal
Line	Length (km)
Yeshwanthpura Junction – Yelahanka Junction – Devanahalli – Chikkaballapura	60
Benniganahalli – Thanisandra – Yelahanka Junction – Doddaballapura	37
Yeshwanthpura Junction – Benninganahalli – Anekal Road – Hosur	66
Tumakuru or Nelamangala – Yeshwanthpura Junction – Benniganahalli	83
Yelahanka Junction – Benniganahalli – Whitefield – Malur – Bangarpet	80
Yelahanka Junction – Yeshwanthpura Junction – KSR Bengaluru – Kengeri – Ramanagara	50
Total	376

In November 2011, RITES conducted a feasibility study exclusively for suburban rail services in Bengaluru and submitted their final report to the Directorate of Urban Land Transport (DULT) in November 2012. The 179-page report studied all existing routes totalling 440.8 km of the rail network in and around the city, and development of suburban rail services over three phases.

The state government led by Chief Minister Siddaramaiah approved the suburban rail project on 5 July 2013 and announced it in the 2013-14 state budget that he presented on 9 July 2013. The budget proposed the setting up of the Bengaluru Suburban Rail Corporation Limited (BSRCL), a special purpose vehicle (SPV) to implement the project estimated to cost ₹8,759 crore (US$940 million). In the 2016-17 Railway budget, Union Railway Minister Suresh Prabhu announced a partnership with Karnataka government for a ₹9,000 crore suburban rail network for Bengaluru, but did not allocate any funds.

2012 proposal
From	To	Distance (km)
KSR Bengaluru	Mandya	92.88
KSR Bengaluru	Yeshwanthpura Junction	5.35
Yeshwanthpura Junction	Tumakuru	64.00
Yeshwanthpura Junction	Yelahanka Junction	12.45
Yelahanka Junction	Baiyappanahalli	19.23
Yeshwanthpura Junction	Baiyappanahalli	16.12
Yelahanka Junction	Doddaballapura	20.72
Yelahanka Junction	Chikkaballapura	46.05
Baiyappanahalli	Hosur	48.59
KSR Bengaluru	Baiyappanahalli	10.76
Baiyappanahalli	Bangarpet Junction	59.45
Soladevanahalli	Kunigal	45.2
Total		440.8

=== Final revision and approval ===
On 3 February 2016, the state government proposed a modified version of the original RITES plan. This seemed to kick-start the project with a ₹1,000 crore investment to connect Mandya with Kengeri, Whitefield with Baiyappanahalli and Tumakuru with Yeshwanthpura Junction. The state government had released 100 crore towards the same. The state appointed RITES again to study the feasibility of the project, and the latter's survey deemed the project as feasible. However, Railways stated that the proposed Phase Two of the project (linking Tumakuru and Yeshwanthpur not feasible.

In November 2018, RITES prepared a revised plan for a 161 km (100 mi) network which was again amended in August 2019 to reduce costs. Out of 82 stations, 29 stations were shelved, route length reduced to 148 km (92 mi) and the cost lowered to ₹16,000 crores. This was finally approved by Government of India. On 7 October 2020, the project was approved by Prime Minister's Office and the Cabinet Committee on Economic Affairs (headed by the Prime Minister).

=== Construction ===
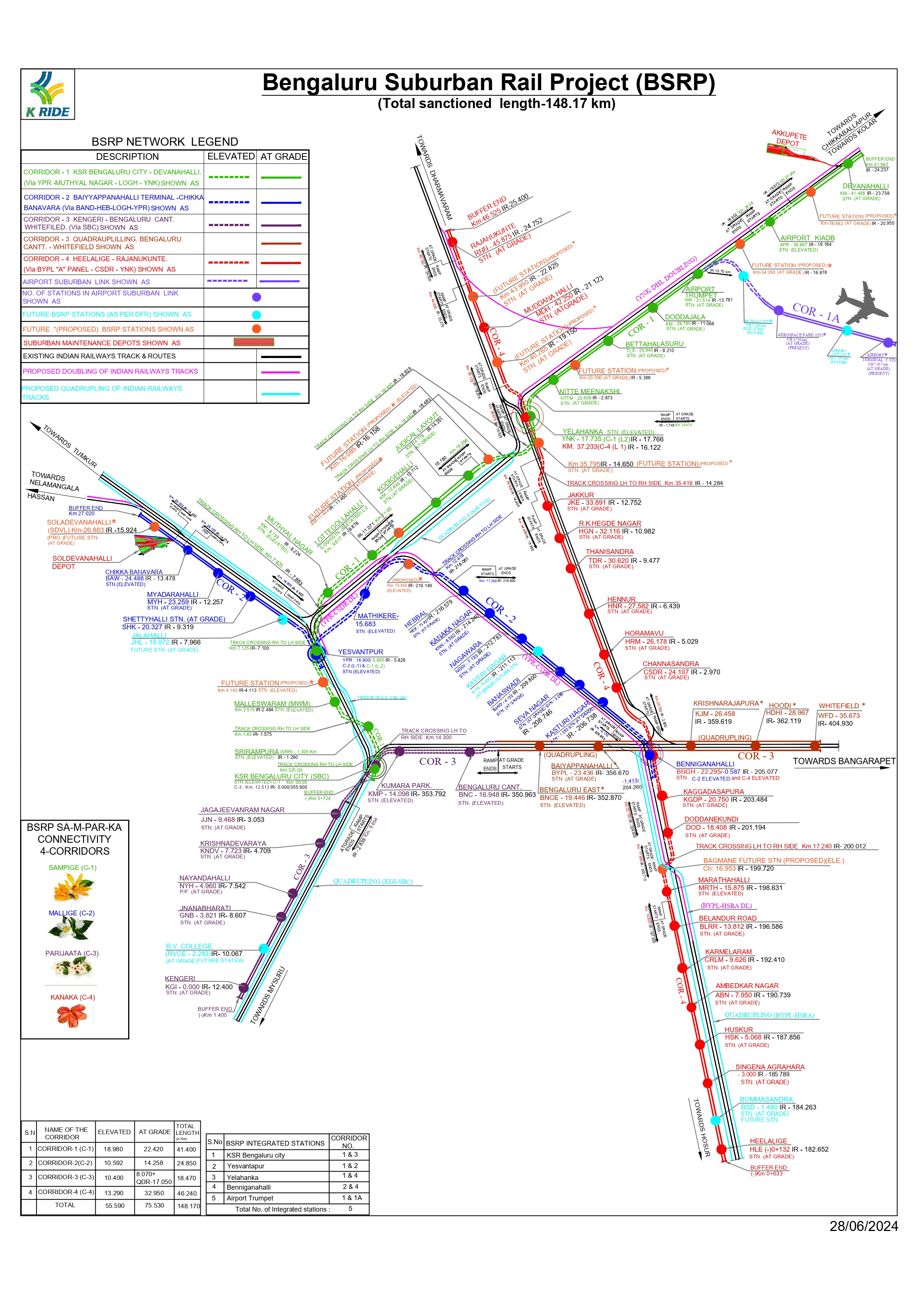
Map of Bengaluru Suburban Railway project with construction details.

A joint venture between Government of Karnataka and Ministry of Railways named K-RIDE was set up to boost rail infrastructure projects such as BSRP in the state of Karnataka. In 2020, the organisation had kick-started the Suburban project by calling tenders for Land Survey, hiring staff etc. Two priority lines; Mallige and Kanaka were taken up first as per Government of Karnataka's advice. On 20 June 2022, Prime Minister Narendra Modi laid the foundation stone for the start of construction of the project.

During November 2021, tenders were called for the elevated viaduct portion of corridor 2 (Mallige line). However, there was a delay in awarding the tender due to land acquisition issues, railway land transfer, approval by IR, formalities etc. Meanwhile, a consortium of Egis, Louis Berger & AECOM JV won bid and were appointed General Consultants in February 2022. The tender for Mallige line was awarded to L&T in August 2022 for 8 km of elevated viaduct. Construction began in mid-2023 after all hurdles were removed.

Tender for construction of corridor 4 (Kanaka line) was awarded to Larsen & Toubro in August 2023. As of August 2023, tender for corridor 1 (Sampige line) was under preparation. Talks surfaced regarding shelving of corridor 3 (Parijaata line) as it ran parallel along the existing Purple line of Namma Metro, in response the state minister for railways stated that corridor 2 and 4 were a priority. Further he added that corridor 1 and 3 presented their own sets of challenges involving a lot of technical, infrastructural and administrative work which K-RIDE currently does not possess.

== Network ==
=== Existing regional services ===
Indian Railway's South Western Railway zone currently operates its regional services with MEMU and DEMU trains originating from Bengaluru to Hosur, Dharmapuri, Jolarpettai, Tumkur, Marikuppam near Kolar Gold Fields, Bangarapet, Hindupur, Mysore, Kolar, Kuppam and Hassan. (Note: Hosur, Dharmapuri and Jolarpettai are across the state border in Tamil Nadu. Hindupur and Kuppam are across state border in Andhra Pradesh, while Tumakuru, Bangarapete, Mysuru, Marikuppam, Kolar and Hassan are in Karnataka.) (Note: Service to and from Hassan, Hindupur, Hosur, Dharmapuri and Tumakuru are operated from Yeshavantapur Junction, while services to Mysore, Kolar, Marikuppam, Kuppam, Bangarapet and Jolarpettai are from Bengaluru City and Bengaluru Cantonment.)

=== Overview ===
Under Construction
No.	Line name	Terminals		Stations	Distance (km)	Opening date
1	Mallige	Benniganahalli	Chikkabanavara	14	25.07 km (15.58 mi)	2029
2	Kanaka	Heelalige	Rajanukunte	19	46.24 km (28.73 mi)	2030
				64	71.31 km (44.31 mi)	
Approved
No.	Line name	Terminals		Stations	Distance (km)	Status
1	Sampige	KSR Bengaluru	Devanahalli	15	41.48 km (25.77 mi)	In Tendering
1A	Sampige	Airport Trumpet	KIAL	2	5.50 km (3.42 mi)	In Tendering
2	Parijaata	Kengeri	Whitefield	14	35.52 km (22.07 mi)	Approved
				64	82 km (51 mi)	

=== Sampige (Line 1 & 1A) ===
After the inauguration of the international airport in 2008, a suburban rail link to it was first mooted in 2010 with the Yeshawanthapura Junction – Devanahalli – Chikkaballapura line. Later in 2012, the RITES proposal consisted Yelahanka Junction – Doddaballapura line that passed within 6 km of the international airport. A branch line reaching airport was also part of the proposal.

The corridor 1 of the project named Sampige line, connected KSR Bengaluru railway station with Yeshavanthapura junction, Yelahanka, Airport Trumpet interhcnage and Devanahalli. However, the branch line towards Kempegowda International Airport termed 1A was added later. In July 2024, K-RIDE issued tenders for the 41.4 km (25.7 mi) long line in two packages. The 17.63 km (10.95 mi) long KSR Bengaluru to Yelahanka C1A and 23 km (14 mi) long Yelahanka to Devanhalli C1B, including a 5.5 km (3.4 mi) branch line towards the airport respectively. In 2024, C1A remained in the tendering phase while C1B was under planning phase after the government prioritised the works for corridor 2 and 4.

=== Mallige (Line 2) ===
The work on the 28.72 km (17.85 mi) long Mallige line connecting Baiyappanahalli railway station with Chikkabanavara via Banaswadi, Nagawara, Hebbala and Yeshavanthapura began in 2022, marking the commencement of the city's long-awaited suburban railway project. A minor amendment to the line was made later with termination at Benniganahalli instead of Baiyappanahalli. Earlier set to be operational by the end of 2026, the deadline has been pushed to March 2027.

=== Parijaata (Line 3) ===
The 35.2 km (21.9 mi) long Parijaata line is planned to connect Whitefield with Kengeri via Krishnarajapura, Benniganahalli, Bengaluru Cantonment and KSR Bengaluru. However, there were talks of shelving the line as it ran parallel along the existing Purple line of Namma metro. But minister for state railways V Somanna responded that the line was being shifted below the list of priorities with line 2 and 4 placed above.

=== Kanaka (Line 4) ===
Following Mallige line, pre-construction works on the 47.7 km (29.6 mi) long Kanaka line began in 2024 a year after tender works for the same were awarded to Larsen & Toubro. The line with 23 stations will connect Heelalige with Rajanakunte via Marathalli, Benniganahalli, Thanisandara and Yelahanka railway station. Along with Mallige line, it has also been set with a deadline of March 2027.

== Finances ==
On 1 February 2020, finance minister, Nirmala Sitharaman mentioned in her budget that the project would be implemented at cost of ₹18,600 crores. The central government would provide 20% of the equity and facilitate external assistance up to 60 per cent of the project cost. Though approved in principle by Government of India, budget allocations have been paltry over the last few years as only token amounts have been allocated. The State Government commenced providing budgetary support for the suburban rail project & ₹500 crores were allocated in the 2020-21 budget.

== Infrastructure ==
=== Signalling ===
World's first and only railway with European Train Control System (ETCS 4) with FRMCS on a broad-gauge. ETCS is implemented to support 250 kmph RRTS kind of operation for future expansion of suburban train to nearby towns.

=== Stations ===
The stations are planned to act as integrated commercial hubs with many of them to be built as intermodal integration hubs where commuters can switch easily with other modes of transport like Metro. The stations are set to have automated fare collection system and Platform screen doors as seen in Metros. K-RIDE plans to evolve a total of 57 stations into integrated commercial hubs ('Smart Station Hubs') where people can work, park, shop, eat and trade.

=== Station approach infrastructure ===
KRIDE will work with local civic agencies like GBA, Gram Panchayat to widen and upgrade the approach roads to stations to Tender SURE standard. KRIDE will provide access to the station from all direction with the help of Foot over Bridges (FOBs). Currently, few train stations have restrictions on approach from all directions.

=== Rolling stock and depot ===
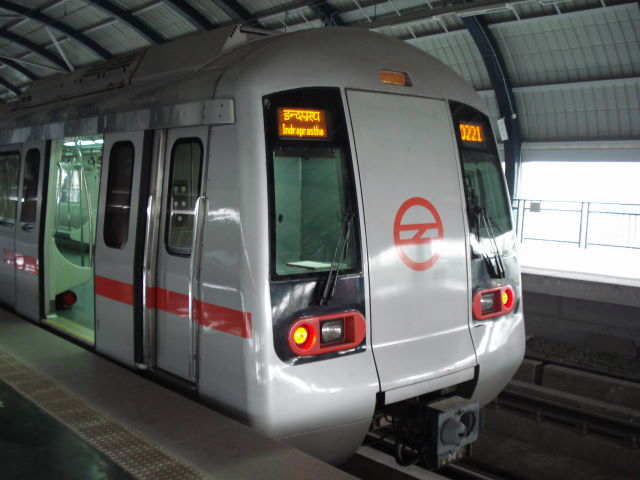
BEML developed RS-13 series Electric multiple unit trainset on Delhi metro. The similar trainset has been recommended for the Bengaluru's suburban railway.

The project report suggests that Electric multiple units (RS 13 series), used in Delhi Metro and manufactured at M/s BEML, Bengaluru, are the most suitable trains for the Bengaluru Suburban Railway System. Two depots were initially planned at Jnanabharathi (56.9 acres) and near Devanahalli at Akkupete (61.2 acres). Neither of these are on the priority Corridors 2 and 4. Hence, feasibility for a depot at Huskuru along Corridor-4 (Kanaka Line) was being explored. Subsequently (in January 2023), the depot at Jnanabharathi was cancelled. A depot is planned at Soladevenahalli on 52.2 acres. In December 2024, two bidders emerged for the Soladevanahalli Depot of Mallige line. Additionally, a tender notice for Akkupete (Devanahalli) Depot of Sampige and Kanaka lines was pending.

=== Integration ===
More than 50% of stations will feature multi-modal integration to connect with Metro trains, Indian Railways, BMTC City buses, KSRTC Inter-city buses, private buses, cabs, and auto-rickshaws. Foot overbridges, travelators, escalators, and underpasses will connect the different modes of transport. Parking spaces are included for first- and last-mile connectivity. Information boards will display incoming train schedules at connected transit stations, such as roadside display boards showing upcoming suburban train times.

Comprehensive Mobility Plan for Bengaluru provides a roadmap for integrated public transport experience that includes Transit-oriented development for the suburban rail network and inter-modal connection with other public transit modes of the city such as Metro and Bus network. Public Bicycle Sharing (PBS) and the Shared Micro-Mobility System initiatives have been launched to provide last mile connectivity to suburban rail stations. Approaches to suburban train stations will be provided from all directions. The project is not only being restricted to the development of the station but also on traffic circulation and road improvement plan, easy switch to other public transport, widening of approach roads and ramp based multi-level access.

== Future expansion ==
K-RIDE has plans for future expansion of the network towards satellite cities and towns around Bengaluru. After South Western Railway zone rejected 452 km (281 mi) expansion proposed in 2023, a new limited 146 km (91 mi) expansion plan to integrate the network with the proposed circular rail was being planned.

K-RIDE's future expansion plan
Line	From	To	Distance
Sampige	Devanahalli	Chikkaballapura	18 km (11 mi)
Mallige	Chikkabanavara	Kunigal	50 km (31 mi)
Mallige	Chikkabanavara	Dobbaspet	36 km (22 mi)
Parijaata	Kengeri	Hejjala	11 km (6.8 mi)
Kanaka	Heelalige	Anekal Road	11 km (6.8 mi)
Kanaka	Rajanukunte	Oddarahalli	20 km (12 mi)
Total			146 km (91 mi)

== See also ==
- Urban rail transit in India
  - Namma Metro
  - Mumbai Suburban Railway
  - Kolkata Suburban Railway
  - Chennai Suburban Railway
