= Ivara Kandapura inscriptions and hero stones =

Temple inscriptions in Karnataka, India

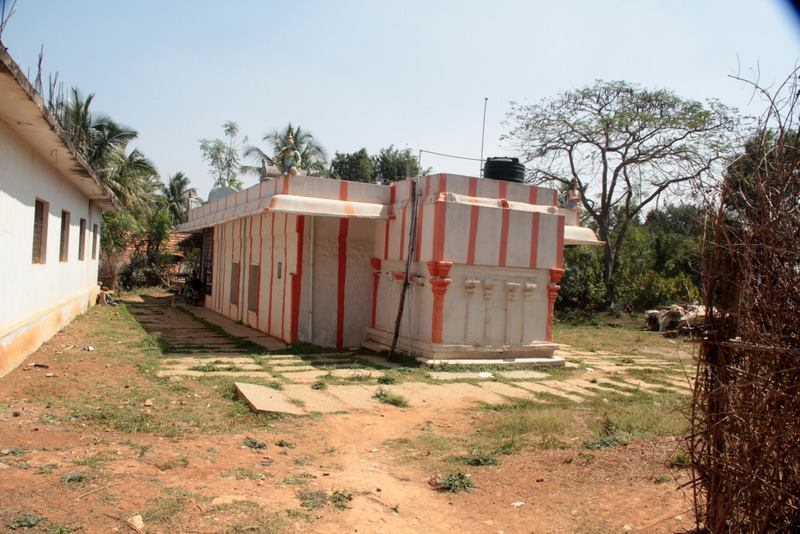
The Gopalakrishna Temple also known as Siddeshwara Temple at Ivara Kandapura.

Ivara Kandapura (also known as Ayvara Kandapura, Aiganadapura) is a small hamlet adjoining Hesaraghatta on the northern outskirts of Bangalore, in Karnataka, India. Ivara Kandapura is famous for a 10th-century temple complex that is home to five temples, named after the pandavas as The Dharmeshwara, Nakuleshwara, Bheemeshwara, Sahadeshwara, Arjuneshwara and Kunti Gudi.

An inscription in Nelamangala Taluk, which is dated to 1029 CE, records the sanction of a Siddeshwara temple by 'Vamnayyan in memory of his Guru. The two inscriptions below marked the boundaries of lands donated to the Siddeshwara Temple.

== Siddeshwara Temple Inscription ==
Kumbarahalli 1033CE Vamanayya's Siddeshwara Temple Lands Boundary Kannada Inscription
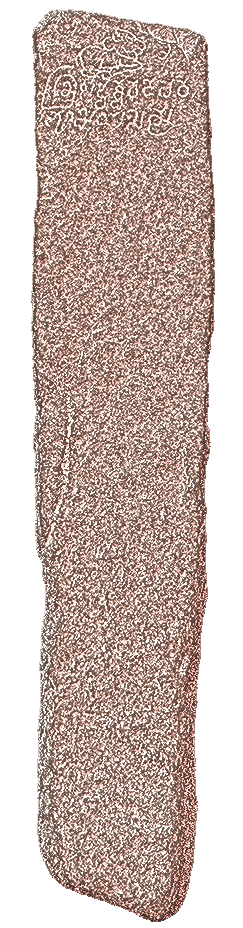
- Digital Image Obtained by 3D Scanning of the Kumbarahalli 1033CE Vamanayya's Siddeshwara Temple Lands Boundary Kannada Inscription
- Material: Stone
- Height: 146 cm (57 in)
- Width: 31 cm (12 in)
- Created: 1033CE
- Discovered: 2022
- Discovered by: The Mythic Society-bengaluru Inscriptions 3D Digital Conseravation Project
- Present location: 13.096417°N 77.495056°E
- Language: Kannada

Kumbarahalli is situated approximately 5 km from Ivara Kandapura, Bangalore. Two inscriptions at Kumbarahalli record the donations to the Siddeshwara Temple at Ivara Kandapura. These inscriptions are related to a 1029 CE inscription at nearby Soladevanahalli, and marked the boundaries of lands donated to the Siddeshwara temple at Ivara Kandapura.

=== Discovery and dating ===
This inscription was discovered In March 2021 by Srinivas of Kumbarahalli and his friend, Dileep Simha of Chikkabanavara in a eucalyptus grove owned by Srinivas. These inscriptions were moved to a nearby warehouse soon after. The inscription was subsequently 3D scanned and published by The Mythic Society Bengaluru Inscriptions 3D Digital Conservation Project Team in the Quarterly Journal of the Mythic Society ( Vol 113, issue 2, April- July 2022).

=== Characteristics ===
The inscription stone measures 146 cm tall and 31 cm wide, while the characters themselves are approximately 4.2 cm tall, 5.1 cm wide, and 0.3 cm deep. The inscription is in Kannada, in the Kannada script, and is dated to 1033CE.

There is a depiction of Shiva's Vahana Nandi(bull) on the inscription stone.

=== Transliteration ===
The inscription is of 2 lines and the transliterated text of the inscription in Kannada and IAST are as follows.

| Line Number | Kannada | IAST |
|---|---|---|
| 1 | ಶ್ರೀ ಸಿದ್ಧೇಶ್ವರ ದೇವರ | śrī siddheśvara devara |
| 2 | ಭೂಮಿಯ ಸೀಮೆ | bhūmiya sīmĕ |

== Gallery ==
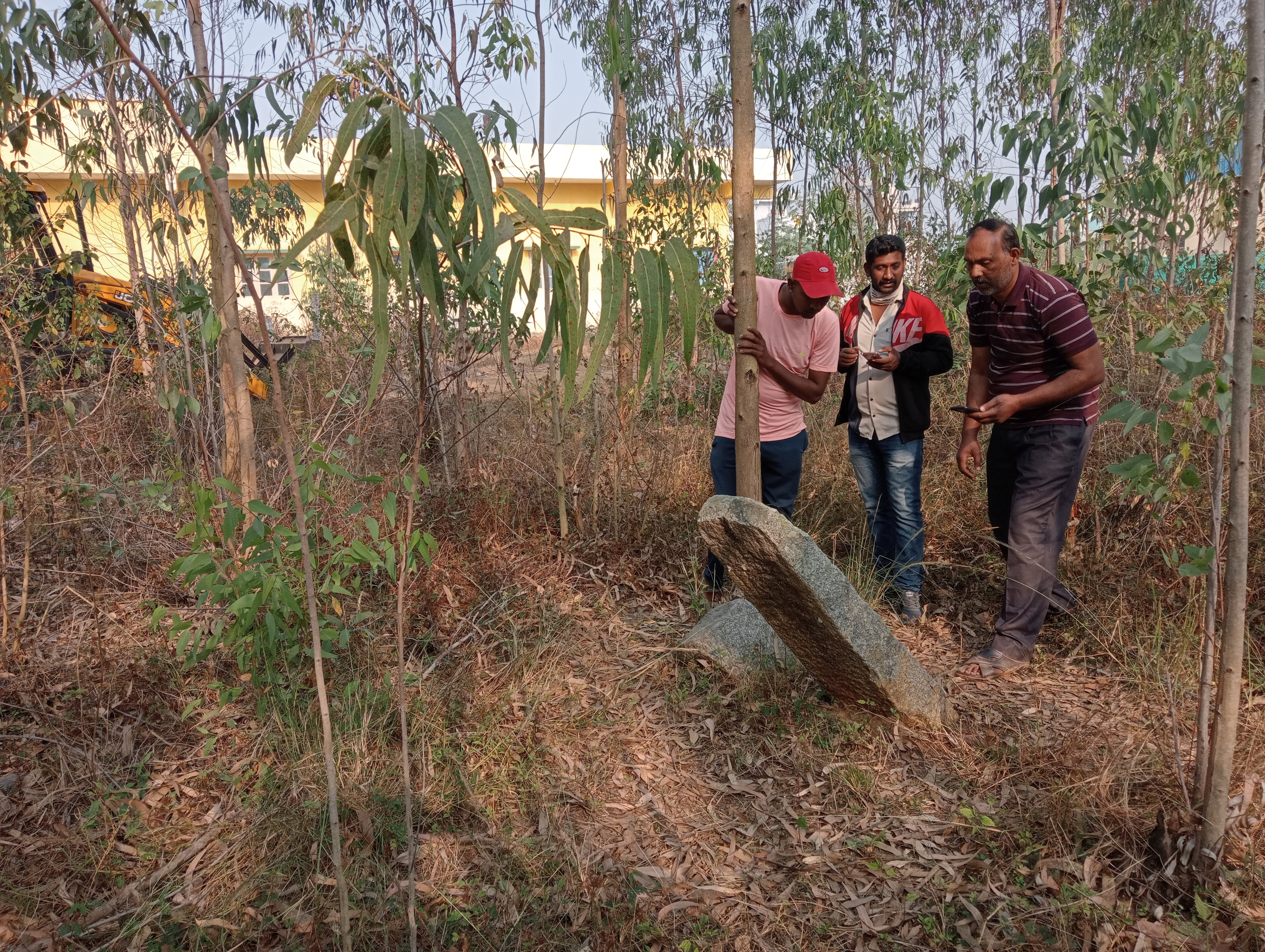
Kumbarahalli 1033CE Vamanayya's Siddeshwara Temple Lands Boundary Inscription

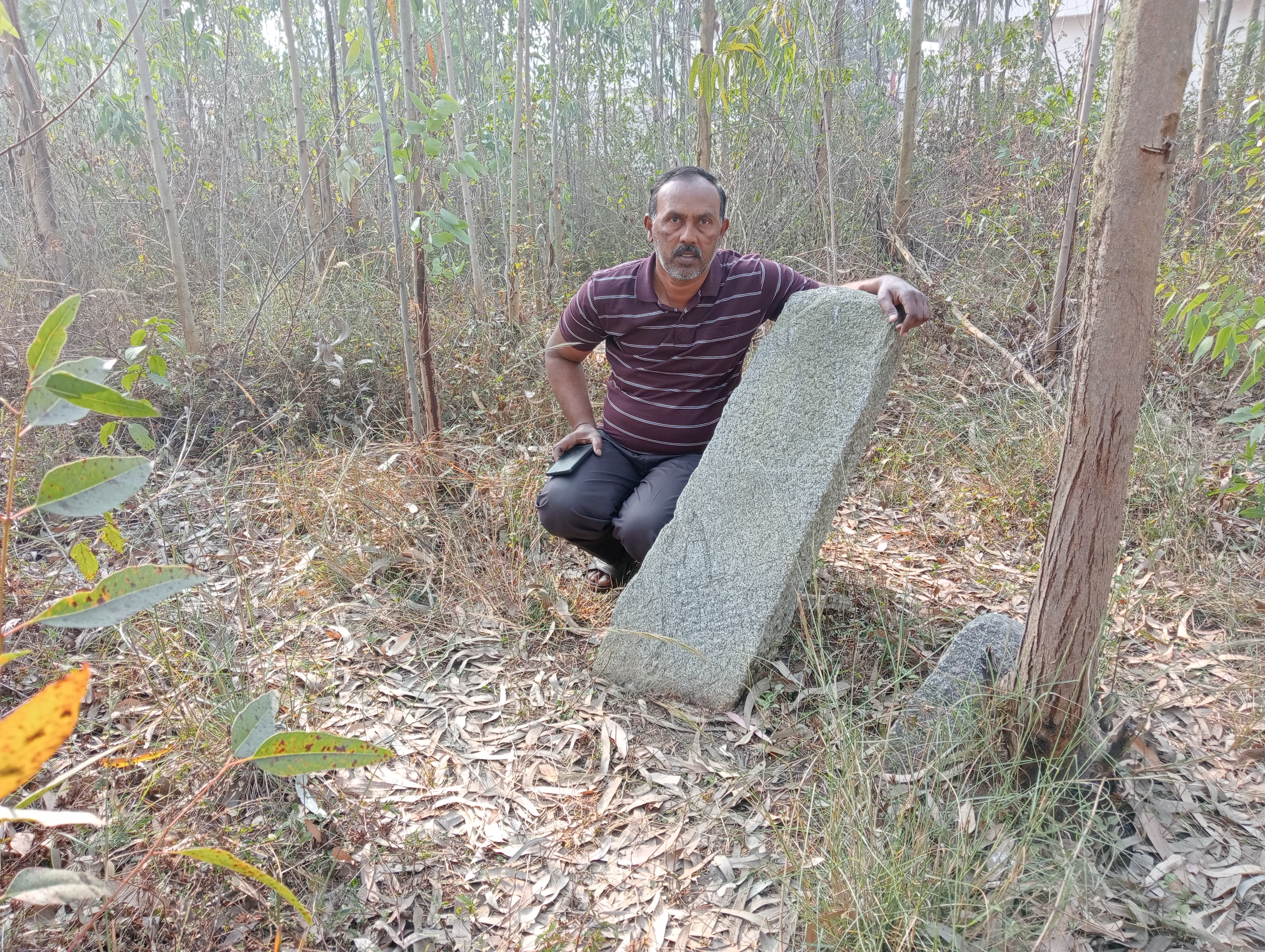
Mr.Shrinivas Sitting near the Kumbarahalli 1033CE Vamanayya's Siddeshwara Temple Lands Boundary Inscription

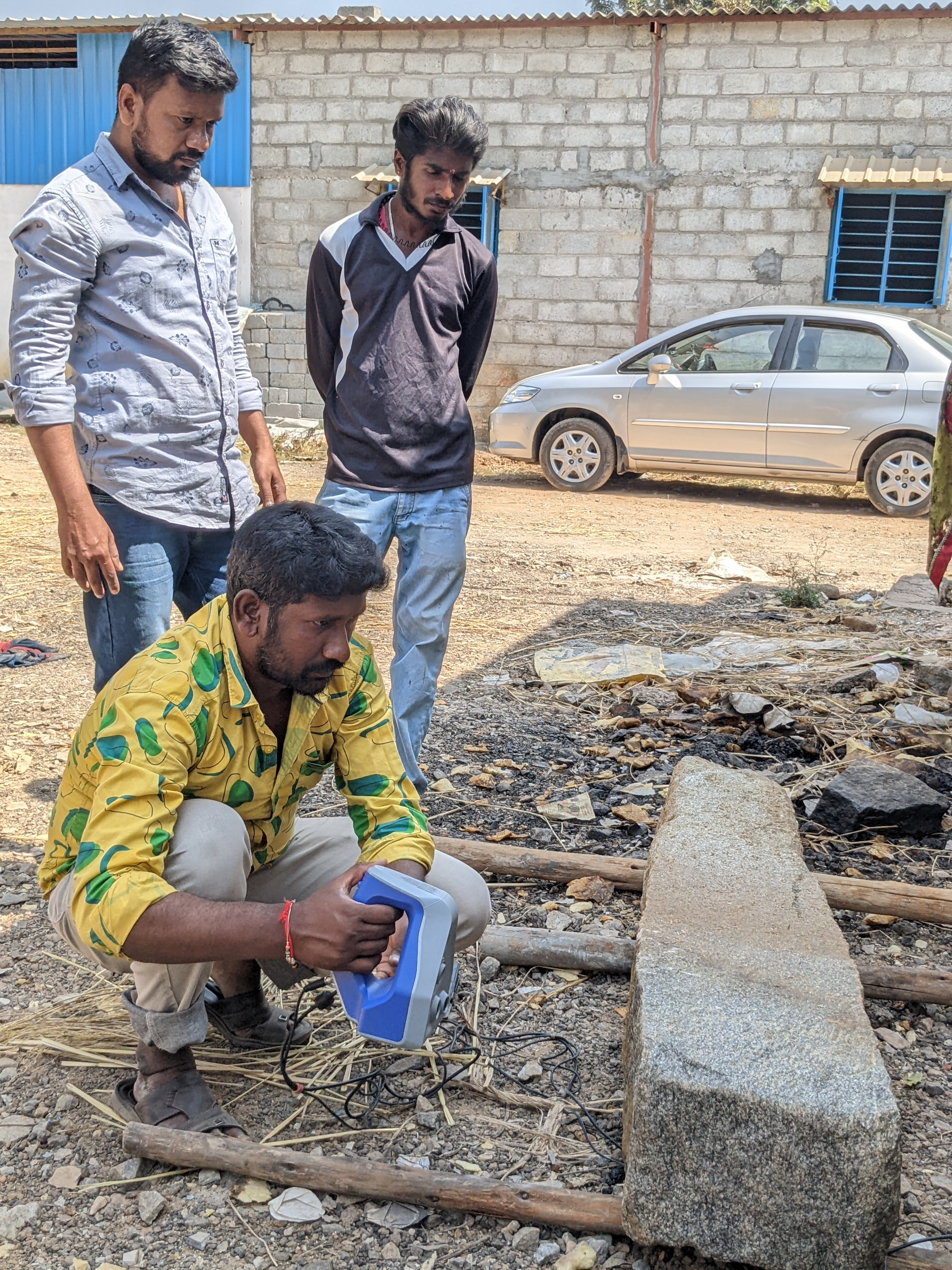
3D scanning of the Kumbarahalli 1033CE Vamanayya's Siddeshwara Temple Lands Boundary Kannada Inscription
