= Chikkabanavara inscriptions and hero stones =

Temple inscriptions in Karnataka, India

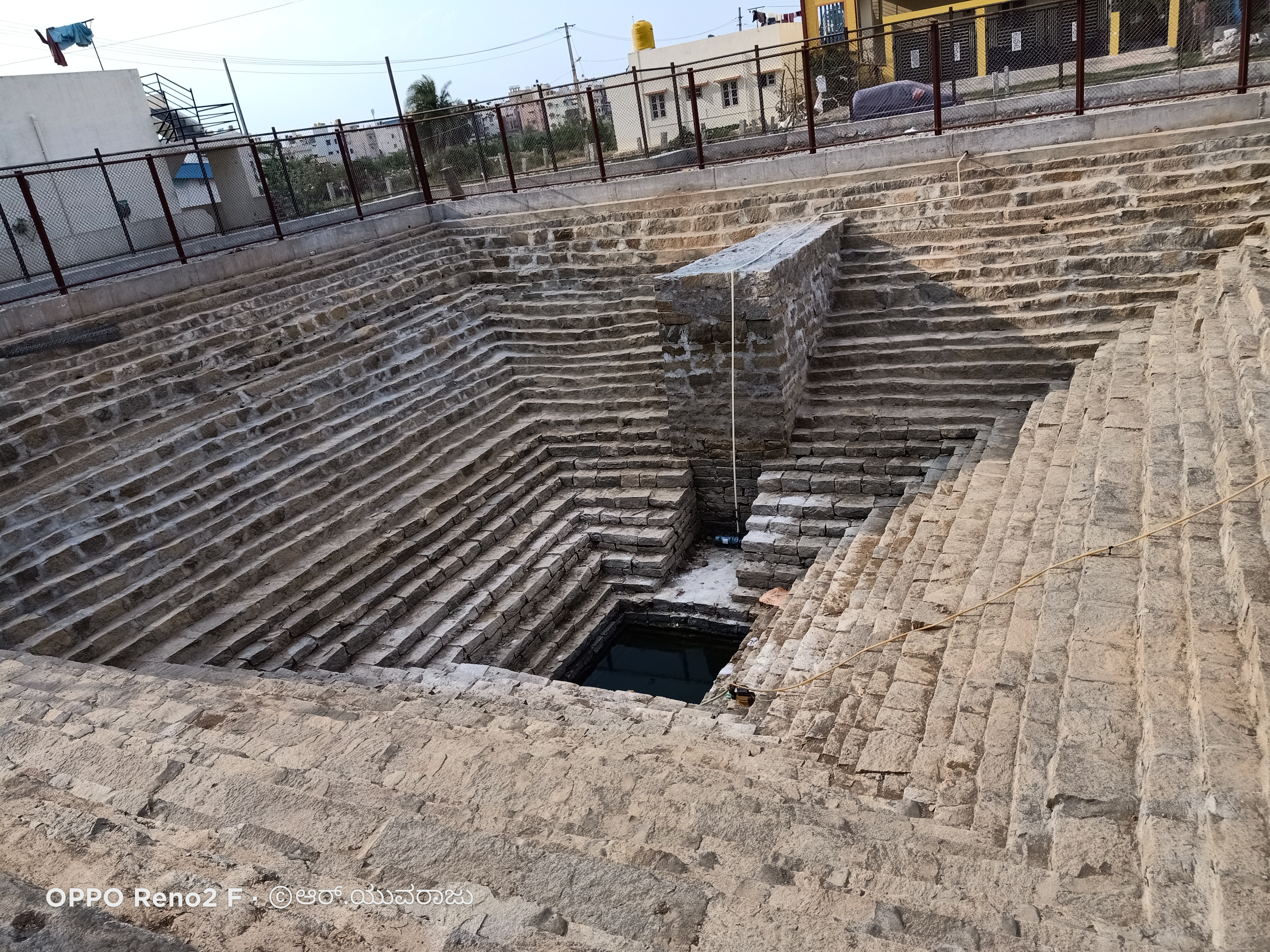
Kalyani at Chikkabanavara.

Chikkabanavara is a residential locality in north Bengaluru, Karnataka, India. Chikkabanavara is also an ancient locality as evidenced by six inscriptions that have been discovered there. Additionally an ancient Kalyani and a few old temples allude to the historicity of the locality. Chikkabanavara is also home to one of the Bengaluru's ancient lakes, its documented history traced to at least a thousand years based on inscriptional references. Additionally, other ancient artefacts such as, Nagastones, fragmented pillars, memorial stones are also found at Chikkabanavara.

Of the six inscriptions, one is documented in the Volume 9, Epigraphia Carnatica, however this inscription stone is not traceable today. The other five inscriptions were discovered in December 2021 by Dileep Simha, a resident of Chikkabanavara and are all preserved in the precincts of the Kalyani in Chikkabanavara. These five inscriptions were read and documented by the Mythic Society Bengaluru Inscriptions 3D Digital Conservation Project team in the Quarterly Journal of The Mythic Society.

== Chikkabanavara 17th century CE Naga Inscription ==
Chikkabanavara 17th century CE Naga Inscription
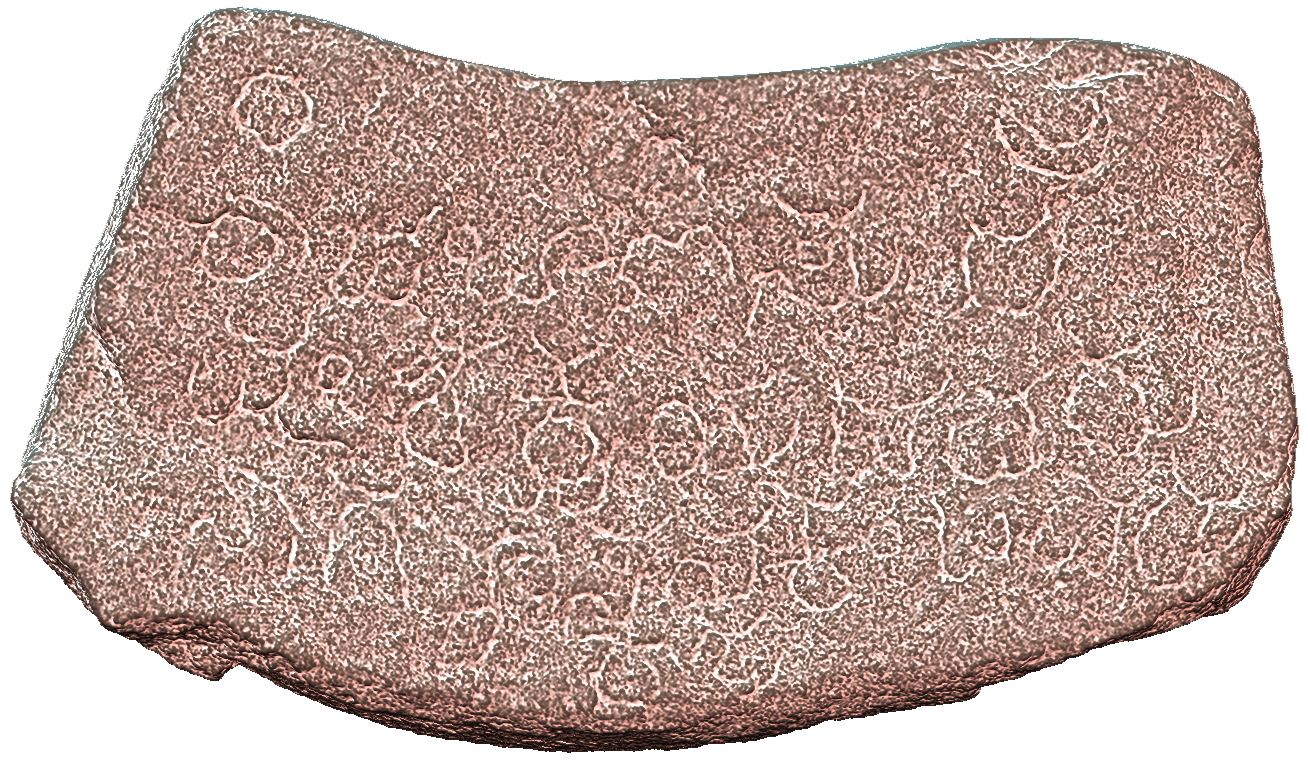
- Digital Image Obtained by 3D Scanning of The Chikkabanavara Kannada 17th-century Naga Inscription
- Material: Stone
- Height: 17 cm (6.7 in)
- Width: 33 cm (13 in)
- Writing: Kannada
- Created: 17th Century
- Discovered: 2022
- Discovered by: The Mythic Society-Bengaluru Inscriptions 3D Digital Conservation Project
- Present location: 13.083861°N 77.502583°E
- Language: Kannada

It is an incomplete Kannada inscription dated to the 17th century CE, the record can be read as "King Banasura, Kshaya Vamsha and Naga Shasana", from this reading the context cannot be deciphered. It was discovered in 2021 by Dileep Simha a Chikkabanavara resident during restoration work of the Kalyani there. Subsequently, The Mythic Society Bengaluru inscriptions 3D digital conservation project team 3D have documented and published in the inscription.

=== Characteristics of the inscription ===
This fragmented inscription stone measures 17 cm tall by 33 cm wide, while the characters are approximately 2.6 cm tall, 3.0 cm wide, and 0.2 cm deep. The inscription is inscribed in the Kannada script and Kannada language and is dated to the 17th century based on paleography.

=== Transliteration Of The Text ===
The inscription is of 4 lines and the transliteration in modern Kannada and IAST as is follows,

Line No	Kannada	IAST
1.	ರಾಜ ಬಾಣಸುರ	rāja bāṇasurarāja
2.	ವಂಶ ಕ್ಷಯದವರು	ruvaṃśa kṣayadava
3.	ನಾಗ ಶಾಸನ ಕಂಬಿವರ	naga sasana kambivaru
4.	ರಾಜ	rāja

== Chikkabanavara Inscription 17th century 'Kam. .Banavara' Fragment Inscription ==
Chikkabanavara Inscription 17th century 'Kam. .Banavara' Fragment Inscription
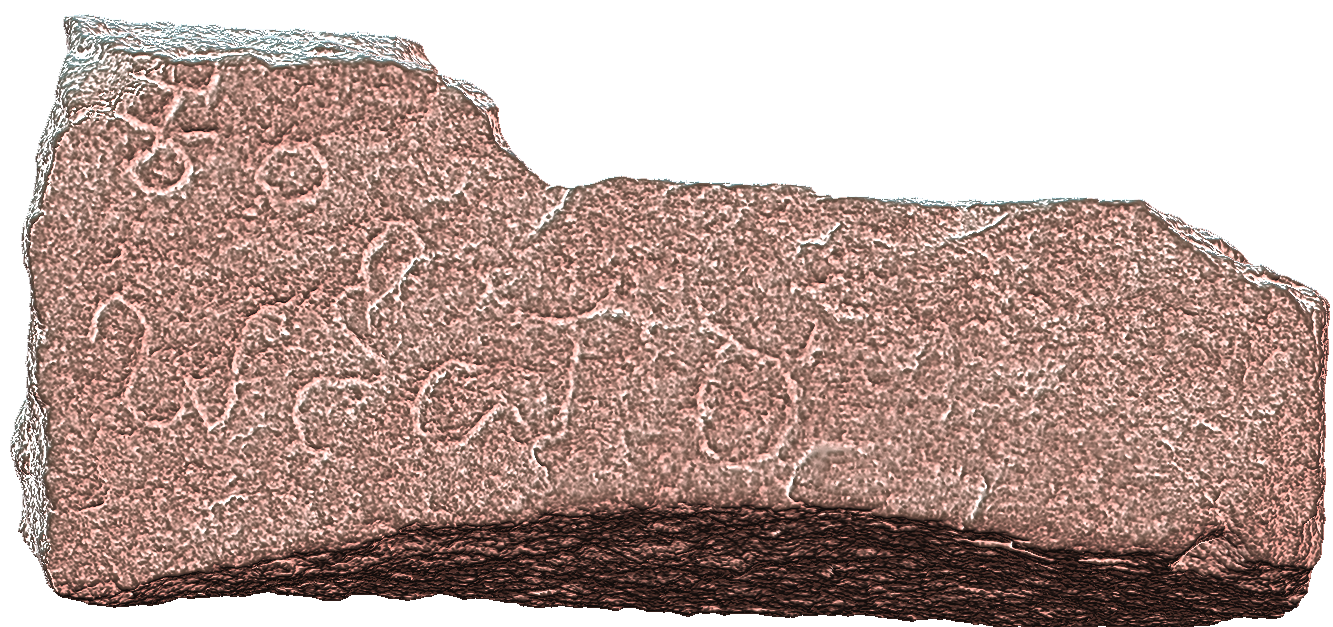
- Digital Image Obtained by 3D Scanning of The Chikkabanavara Kannada 17th-century "kam Banavara" Fragment Inscription
- Material: Stone
- Height: 15 cm (5.9 in)
- Width: 35 cm (14 in)
- Writing: Kannada
- Created: 17th Century
- Discovered: 2022
- Discovered by: The Mythic Society-Bengaluru Inscriptions 3D Digital Conservation Project
- Present location: 13.083861°N 77.502583°E
- Language: Kannada

The inscription is in the Kannada script and Kannada language and is dated to the 17th century based on paleography. It has only two words "kam. . .banavara" This inscription was discovered in 2021 by Dileep Simha a Chikkabanavara resident during restoration work of the Kalyani there. Subsequently, the Mythic Society Bengaluru 3D digital conservation project team have archived and published the inscription.

=== Characteristics of the inscription ===
This fragmented inscription stone measures 15 cm tall by 35 cm wide, while the characters themselves are approximately 3.6 cm tall, 4.3 cm wide, and 0.3 cm deep.

=== Transliteration ===
The inscription is in two lines, the transliteration of the text in modern Kannada and IAST is as follows,

	Kannada	IAST
1	ಕಂ	kaṃ
2	ಬಾಣವಾರ	bāṇavāra

== Chikkabanavara 17th Century Shiva Stuti Fragment Inscription ==
It is a Kannada inscription and records only the beginning of a verse commonly found in inscriptions related to Shaivism. The complete verse is as follows: "Namastumga sirastumbi camdra camara carave trailokya nagararambha milastambhaya sambhavé".

This verse first appears in the Harshacharitha, penned by the renowned poet Bana.This Inscription was discovered at the time of the restoration of the Chikkabanavara Kalyani.

=== Characteristics ===
The inscription is inscribed in the Kannada script and Kannada language and is dated to the 17th century based on paleography. This fragmented inscription stone measures 30 cm tall by 43 cm wide, while the characters themselves are approximately 3.3 cm tall, 4.1 cm wide, and 0.3 cm deep.

=== Transliteration ===
sl.no	Kannada	IAST
1	ನಮಸ್ತುಂಗ ಶಿರಚು	namastuṃga śiracu
2	ಚ ಚಾ .ವರ	ca cā .vara

== Chikkabanavara 14th-century Donation Inscription ==
Chikkabanavara Inscription 17th century 'Kam. .Banavara' Fragment Inscription
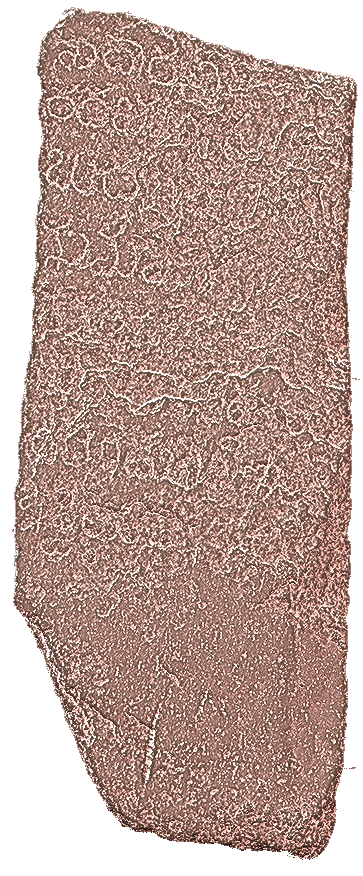
- Digital Image Obtained by 3D Scanning of The Chikkabanavara Kannada 14th-century Donation Inscription - Portion 1

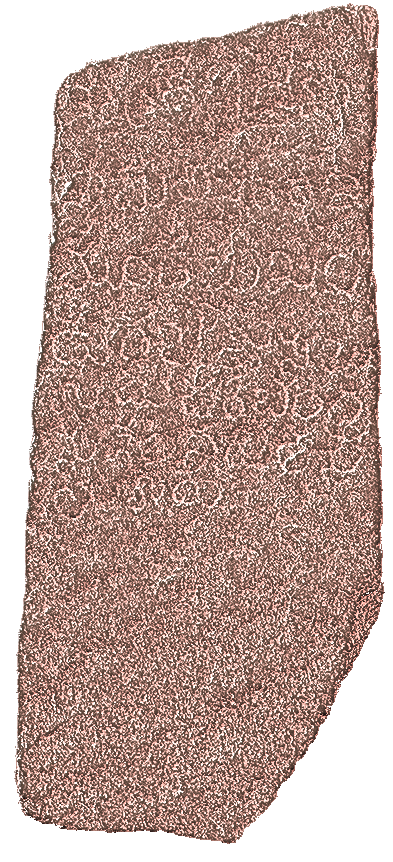
- Digital Image Obtained by 3D Scanning of The Chikkabanavara Kannada 14th-century Donation Inscription - Portion 2
- Material: Stone
- Height: 111 cm (44 in)
- Width: 43 cm (17 in)
- Writing: Kannada
- Created: 14th Century
- Discovered: 2022
- Discovered by: The Mythic Society-Bengaluru Inscriptions 3D Digital Conservation Project
- Present location: 13.083861°N 77.502583°E
- Language: Kannada

The inscription is in 14th-century Kannada script and records the donation of lands measuring (unreadable) some kandugas to the east of some place. Most of the inscription is worn out and the names of the donor, donee and the reason for making the donation are not readable. This inscription stone was discovered by Dileep Simha, a Chikkabanavara resident in 2021 when it was being used as cover for a road side drain. The stone has since been shifted to a Kalyani in Chikkabanavara.

=== Characteristics of the inscription ===
The inscription is inscribed in the Kannada script and Kannada language. The stone measures 111 cm tall and 43 cm wide, with characters approximately 6.3 cm tall, 11.7 cm wide, and 0.25 cm deep.

The inscription has been dated to the 14th century based on paleography.

=== Transliteration of the text ===
The inscription is a total of 15 lines. with 8 lines in front and 7 on the back side of the stone. The transliterated text of the inscription in Kannada and IAST is as follows:

	Kannada	IAST
	(ಮುಂಭಾಗ)	(Front Side)
1	ಸಾದಾರಣ . . .(ಸಂವತ್ಸ)	sādāraṇa . . .(saṃvatsa)
2	ರದ ಚ . . .	rada ca . . .
3	ಬುದ . . . .	buda . . . .
4	ನು ಮಹ . . . .	nu maha . . . .
5	. . . . . . . . . . .	. . . . . . . . . . .
6	. . . . . . . ರ . . .	. . . . . . . ra . . .
7	. . . . . . . . . . . .	. . . . . . . . . . . .
8	. . . . (ಪ್ರಿಥ್ವಿರಾ) . . . . . .	. . . . (prithvirā) . . . . . .
	(ಹಿಂಭಾಗ)	(Back Side)
9	. . . . . ಟ್ಟಣ	. . . . . ṭṭaṇa
10	ಸೋಮ. . . . . ಇ	soma. . . . . i
11	ಮೂಡಲು ಖಂ	mūḍalu khaṃ
12	ಡುಗ . . ಸಲು	ḍuga . . salu
13	ಉದು ಧರೆ ಚಂದ್ರ	udu dharĕ caṃdra
14	ನುಳಂನಬರ ಸಲು	nul̤aṃnabara salu
15	ಲುವುದು	luvudu

== Gallery ==
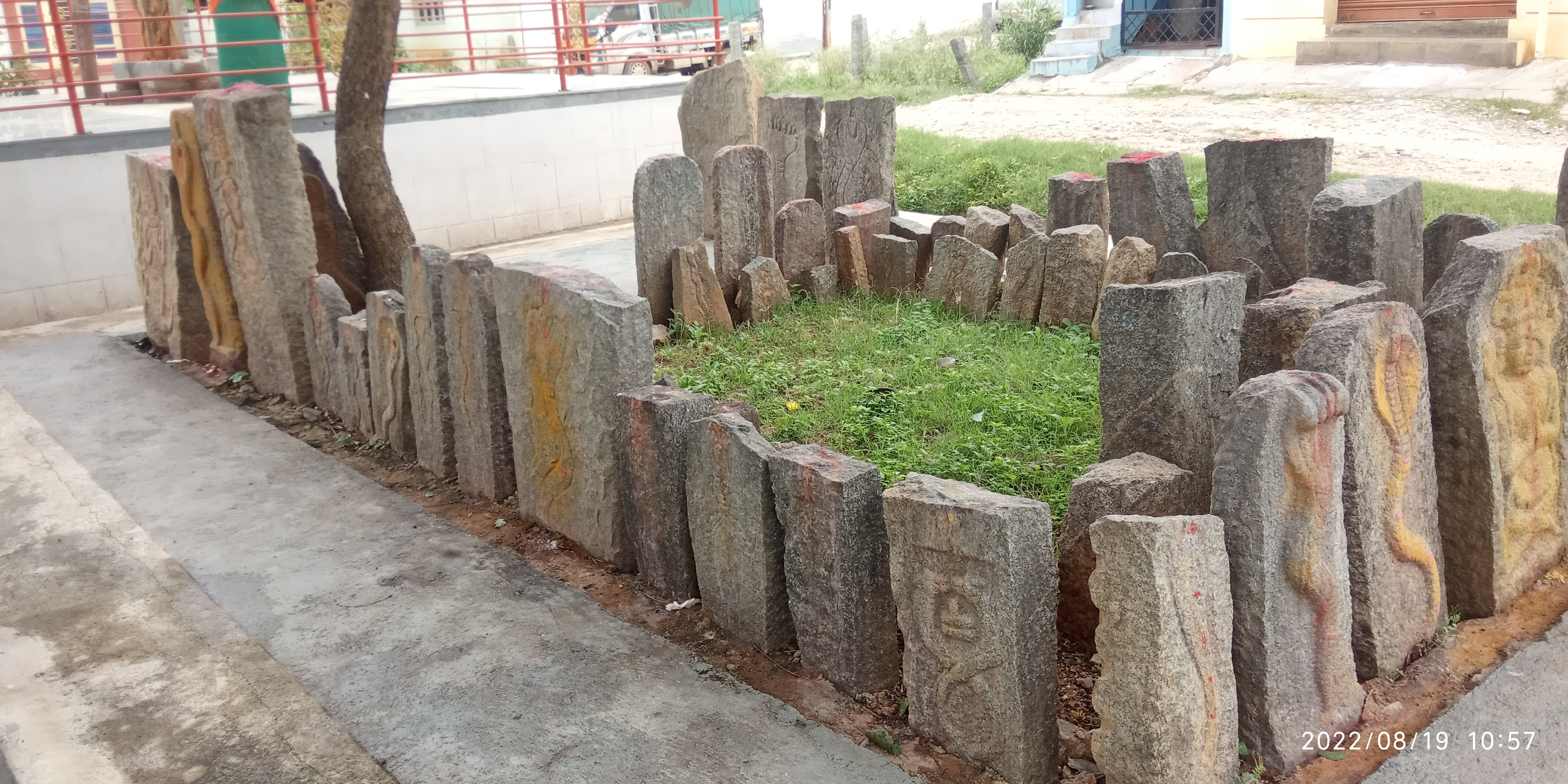
Ancient Nagastones that were discovered during restoration at the Chikkabanavara Kalyani

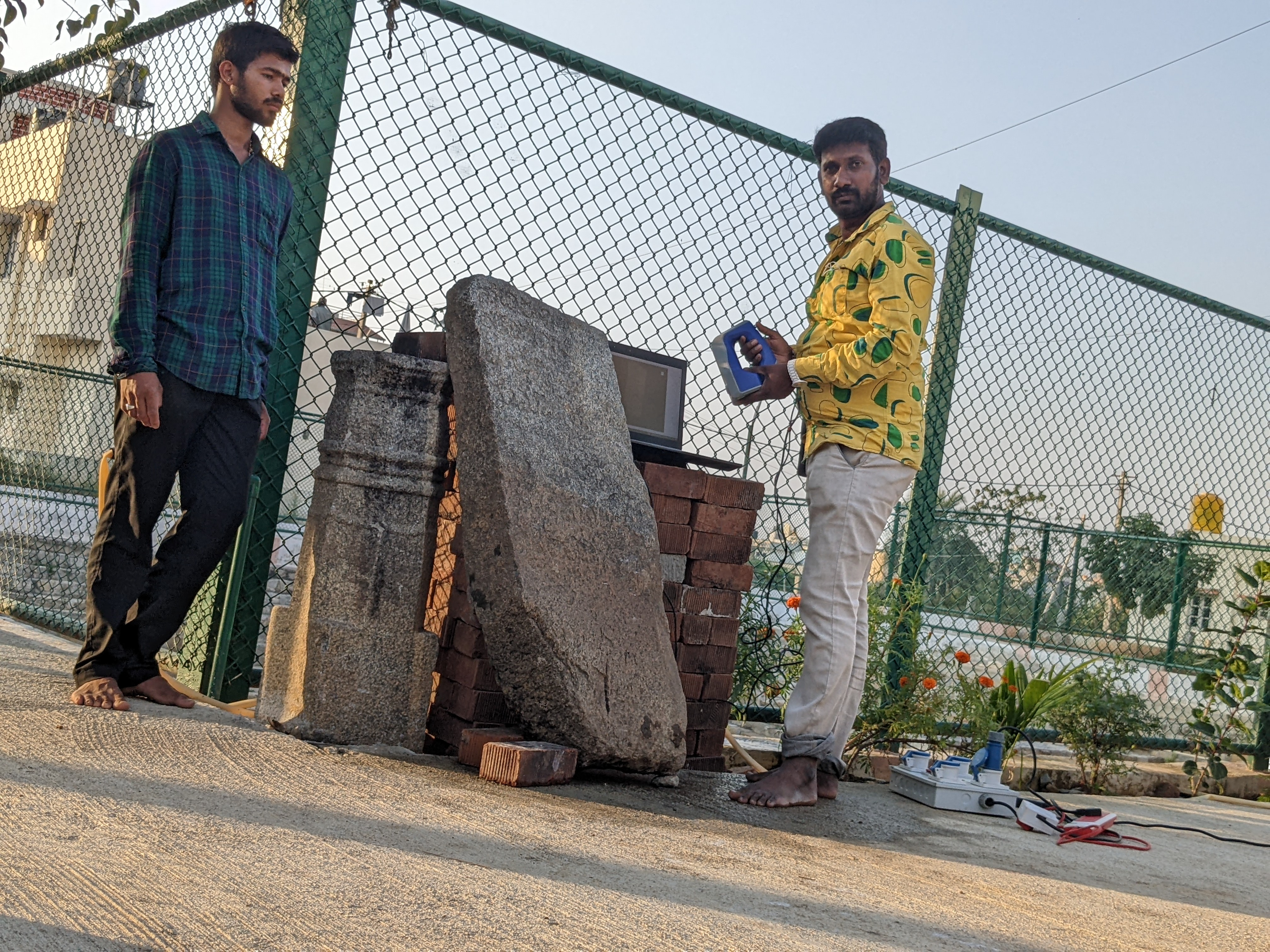
3D scanning of the Chikkabanavara 14th-century Donation Inscription

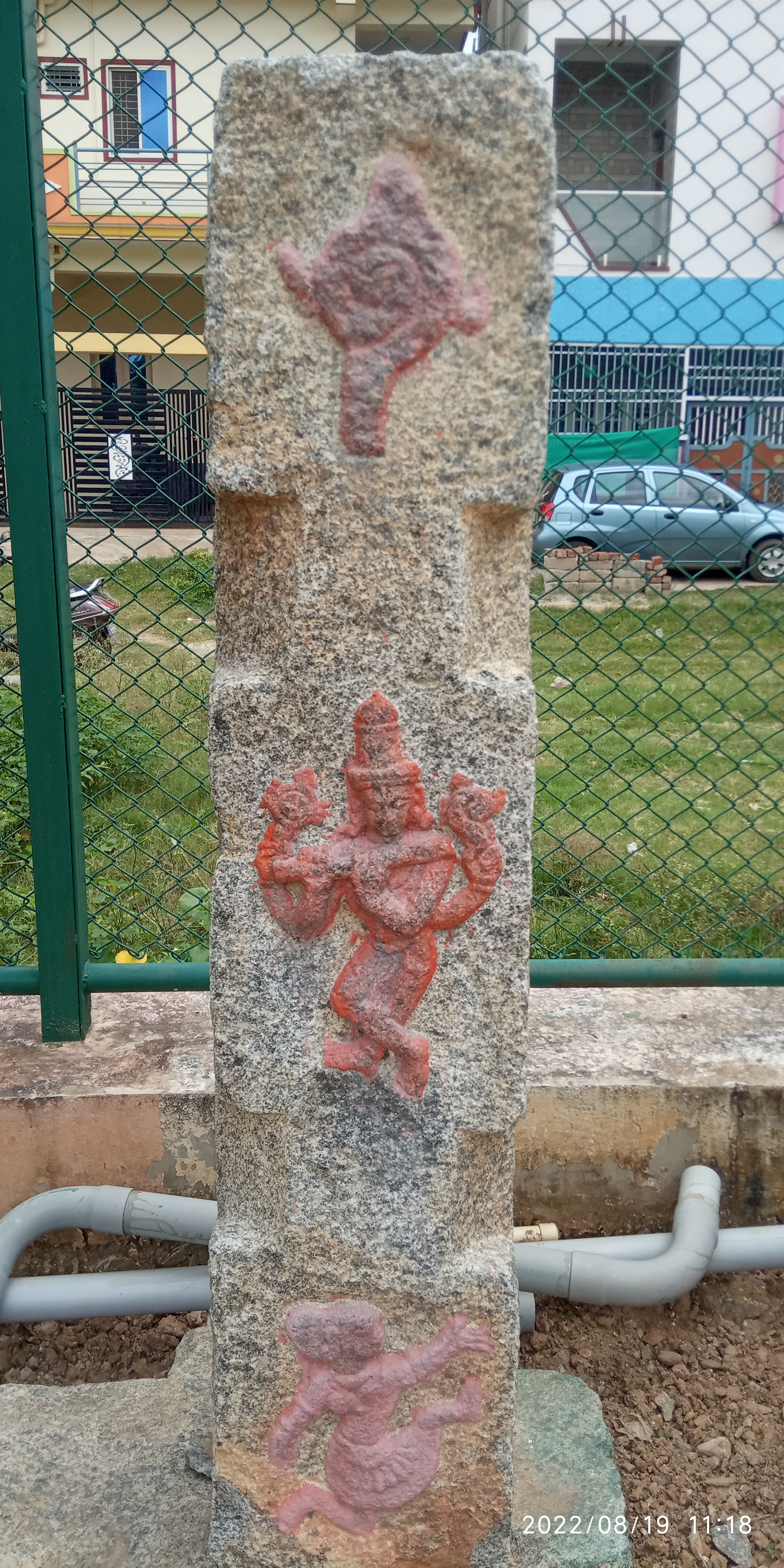
Ancient stone pillar bearing sculptures of Venugopala, Shankha and a Dancer discovered at the Chikkabanavara Kalyani.

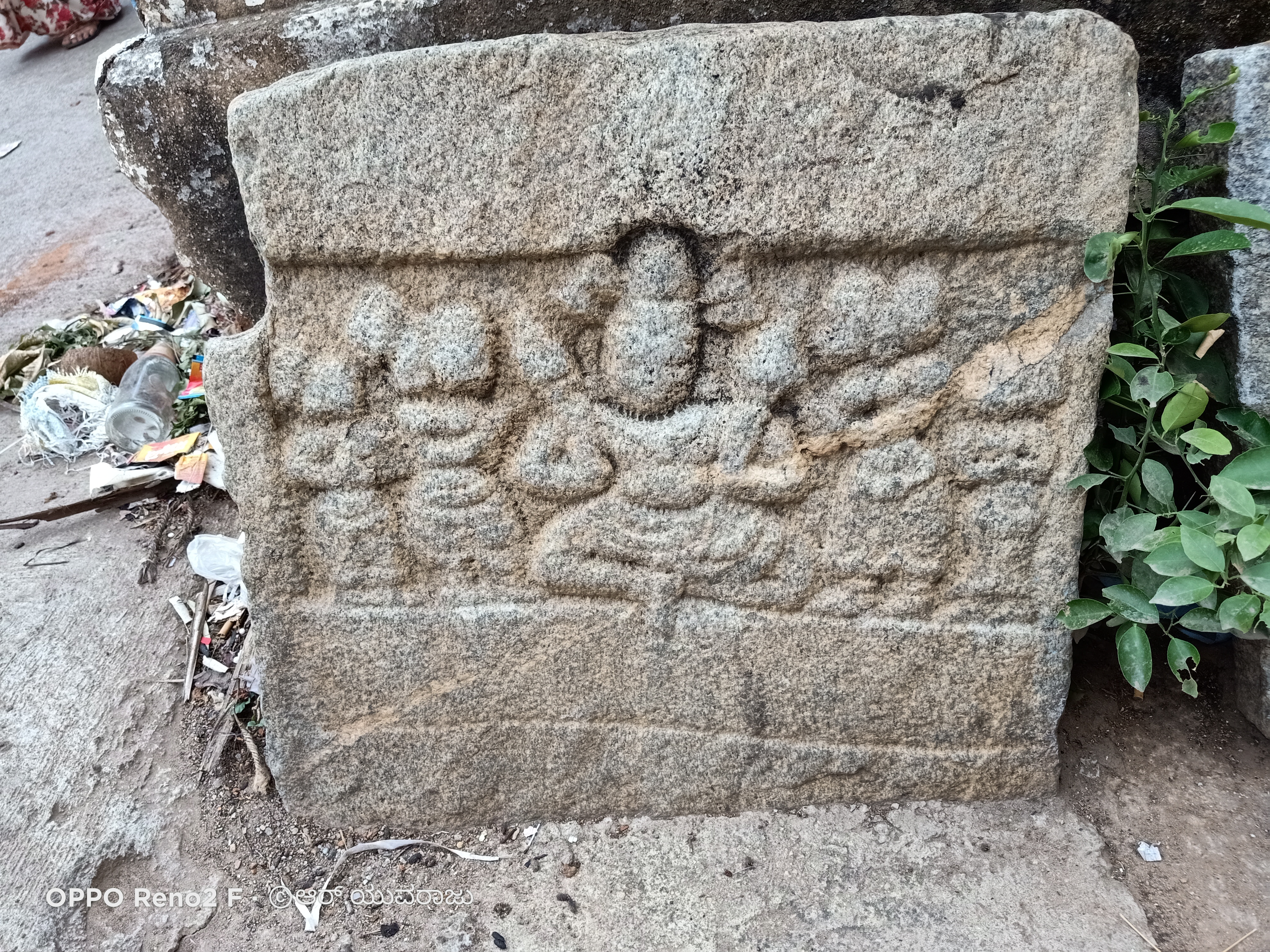
A Veeramasti Memorial Stone dating to 13-14th Century

== See also ==
- Indian inscription
- Kannada inscription
- History of Bangalore
