= Chikkabanavara =

Town in Karnataka, India

- Urban
- Location in Karnataka, India
- Coordinates: 13.084650°N 77.501410°E
- Country: India
- State: Karnataka
- District: Bangalore Urban
- Talukas: Bangalore North

Population (2011)
  - Total: 14,409

Languages
  - Official: Kannada
- Time zone: UTC+5:30 (IST)
- PIN: 560 090

Chikkabanavara is a town in Bengaluru, Karnataka, India. It is located in the Bengaluru North taluk of Bengaluru Urban district in Karnataka. It has one of the oldest surviving lakes in Bengaluru. The lake is located at a distance of 1.5 km north of Chikkabanavara railway station on the Bengaluru Hubballi main line.

== Demographics ==
As of 2011 India census, Chikkabanavara had a population of 14409 with 7514 males and 6895 females.

== Transport ==
=== Bus ===
Bangalore Metropolitan Transport Corporation run buses towards Majestic, KR Market No. 250,253,254,248 Kengeri- 502H, Krishnarajapura (KR Puram) 507A, 507C Peenya, Jalahalli, 250,250AB,250AC, Vijayanagar 248N.

=== Rail ===
The closest railway stations are Chikkabanavara Junction railway station and Soldevanahalli Halt, both around 3.4 to 4.2 km away.

=== Air ===
Kempegowda International Airport is 38 km away approx.

== See more ==
- Chikkabanavara (Bengaluru) Inscription
